= Southwestern United States =

Geographical region

- Region
- American Southwest, the Southwest
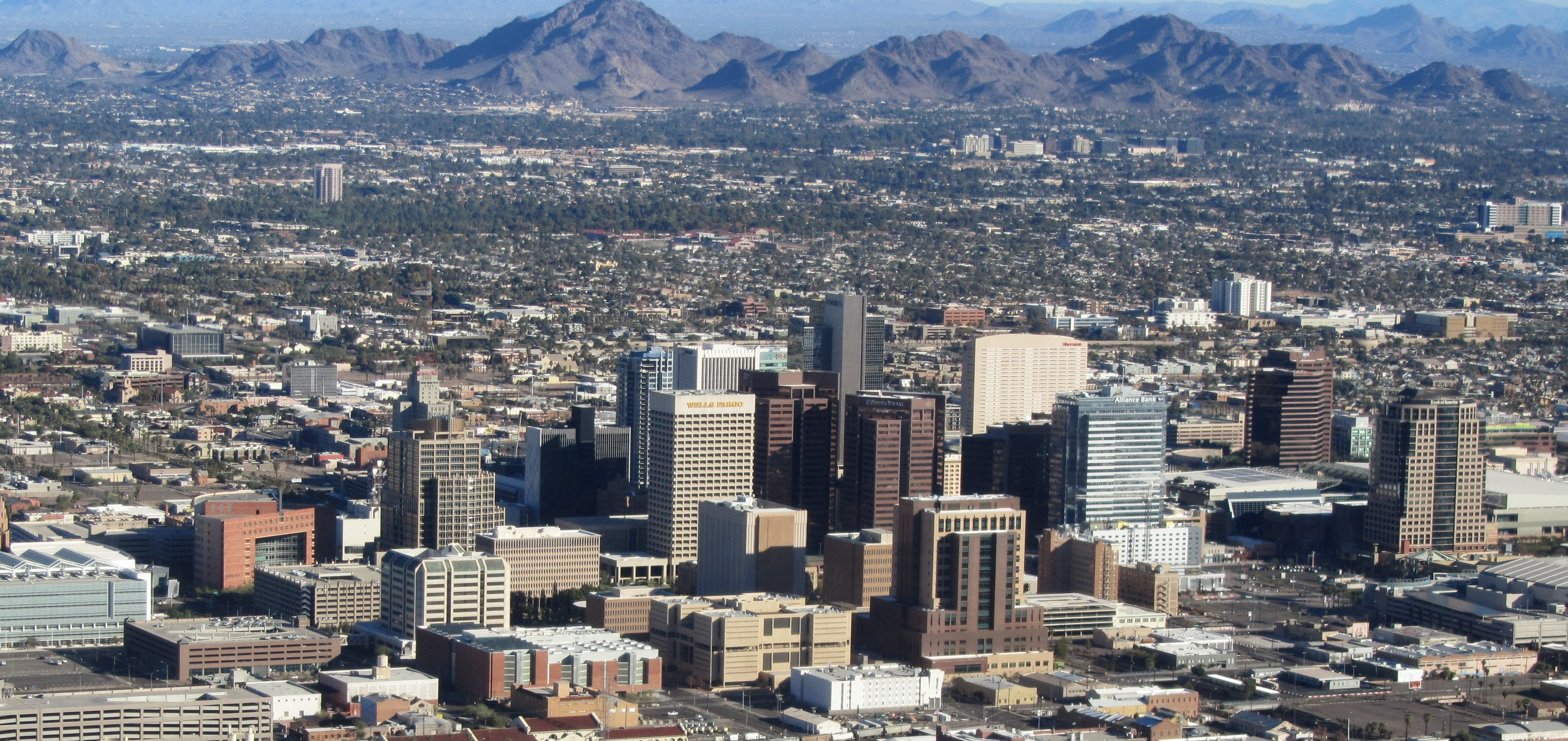
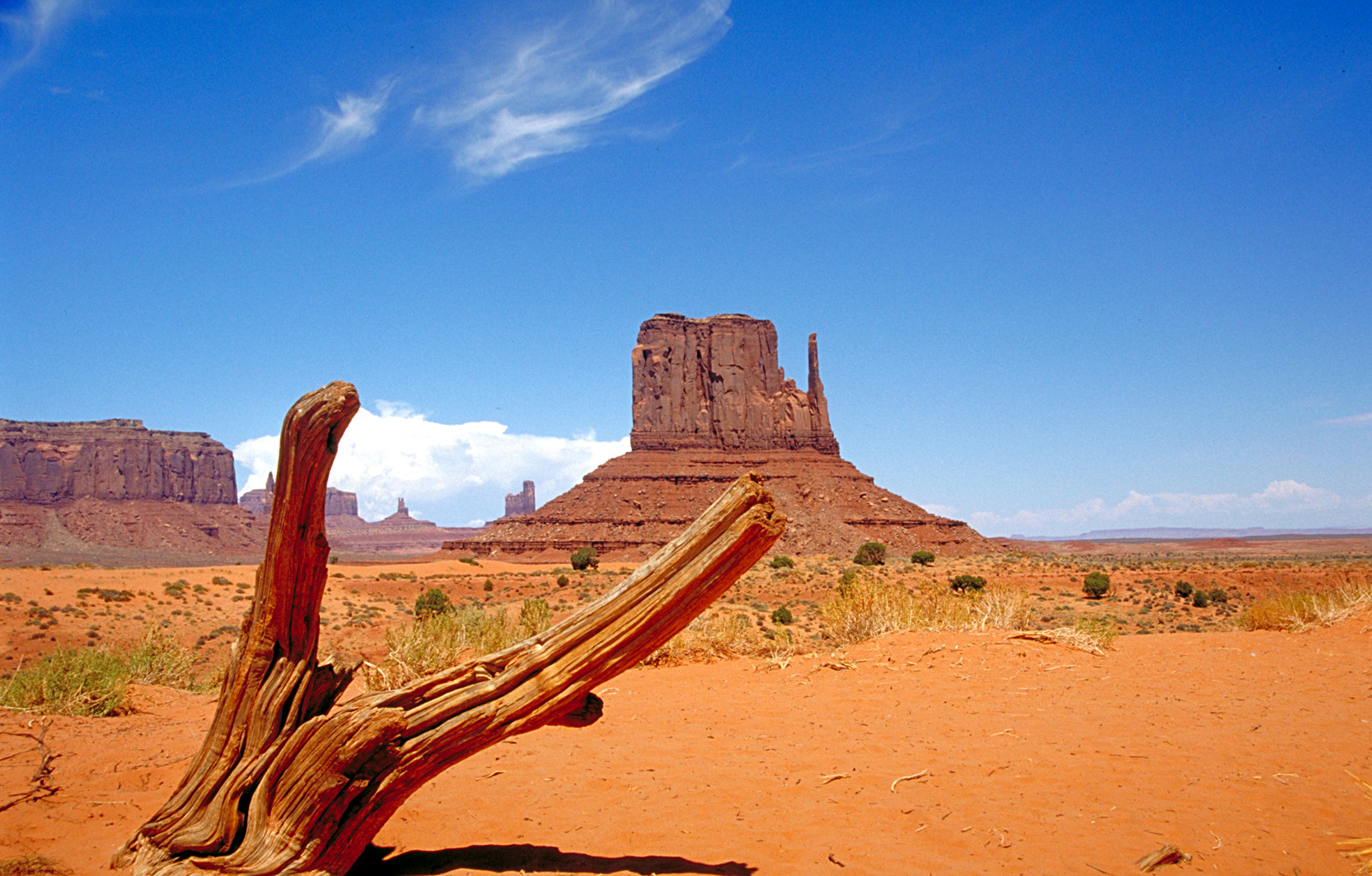
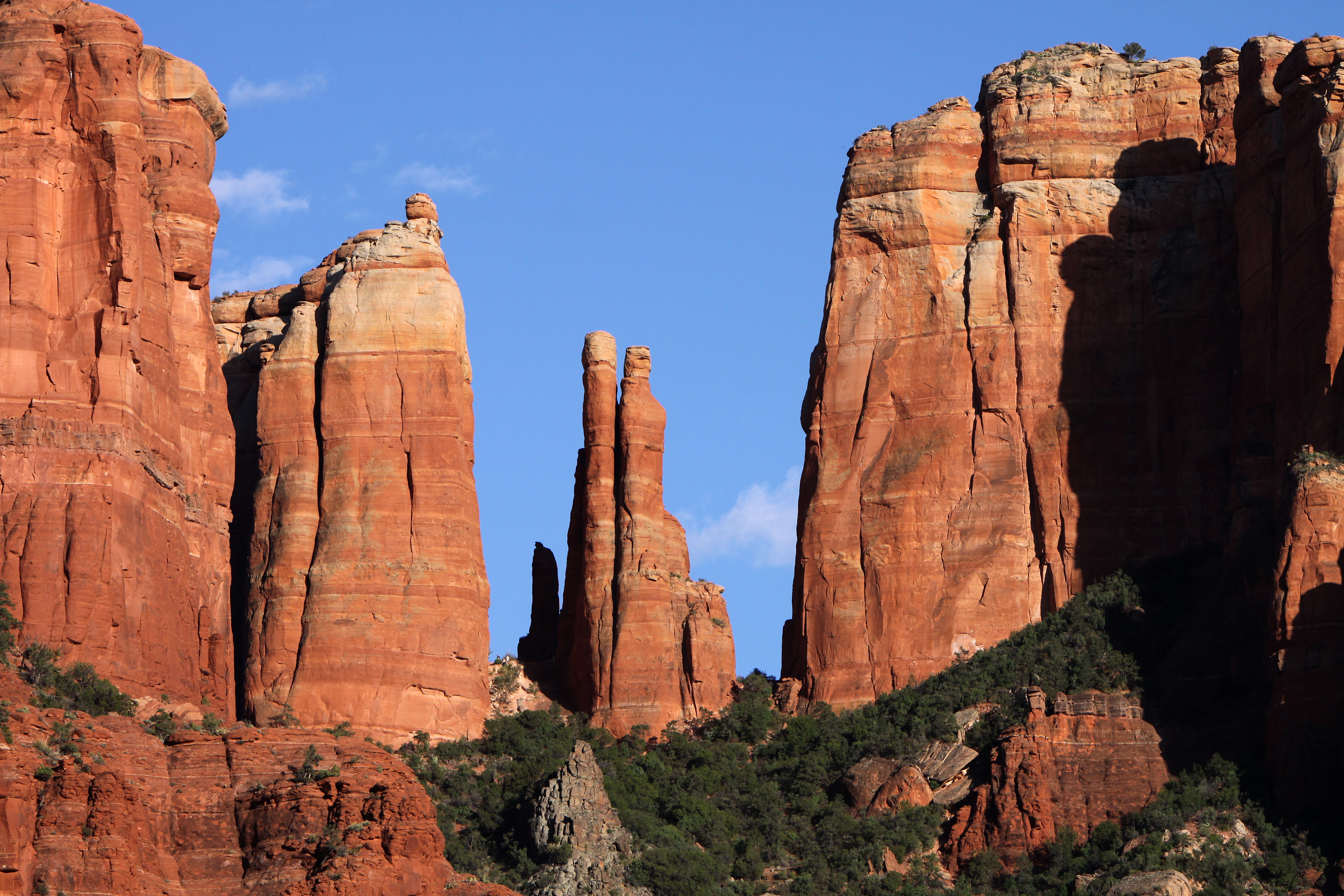
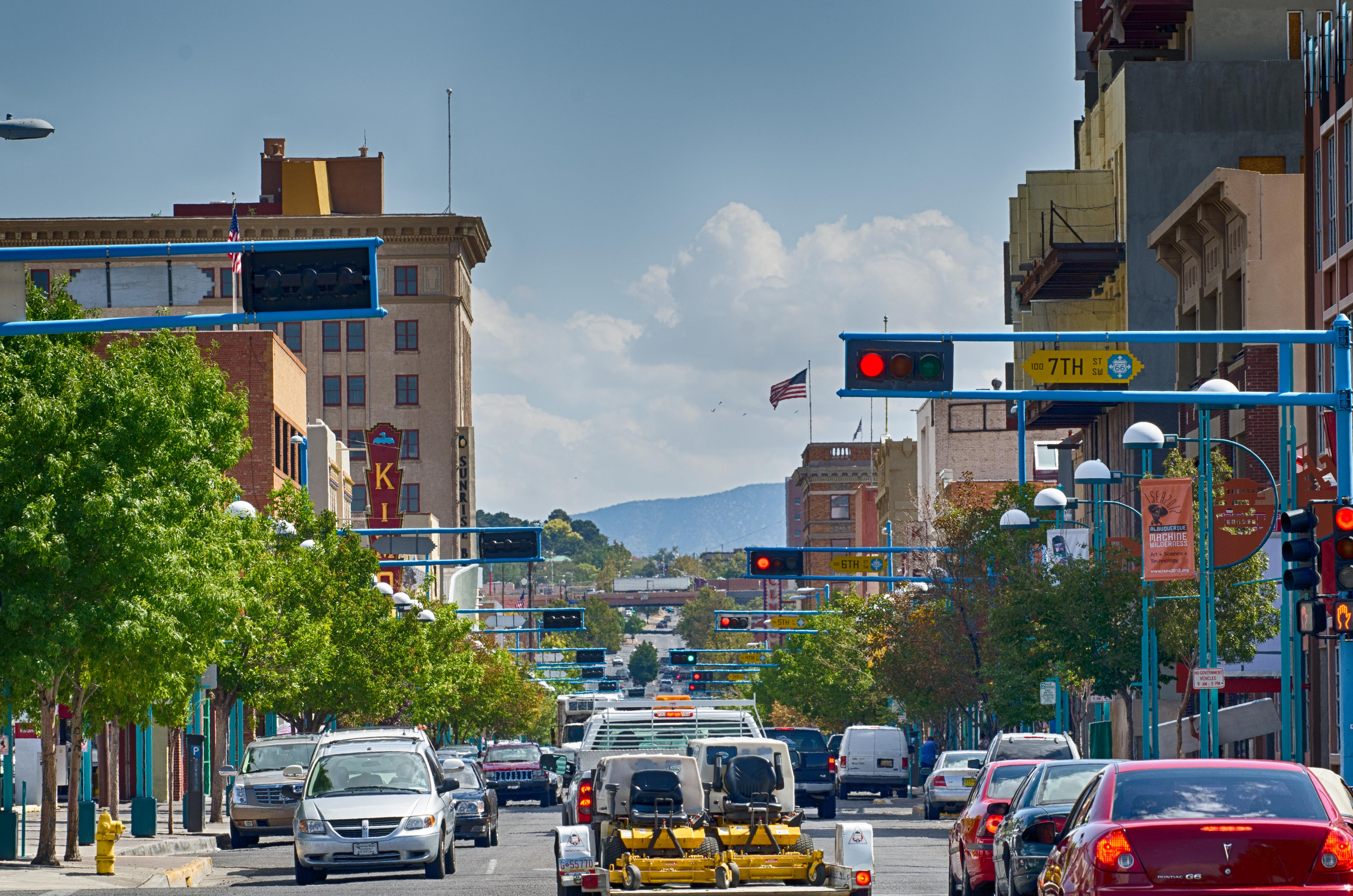
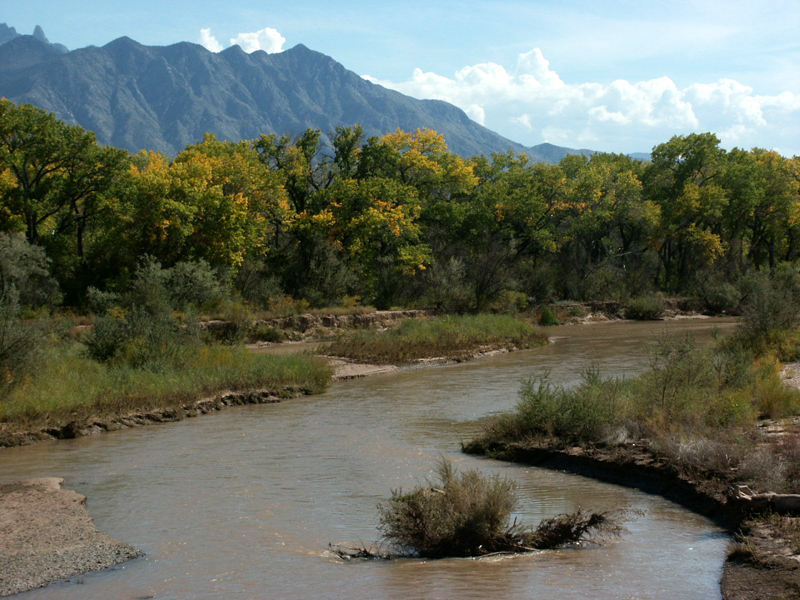
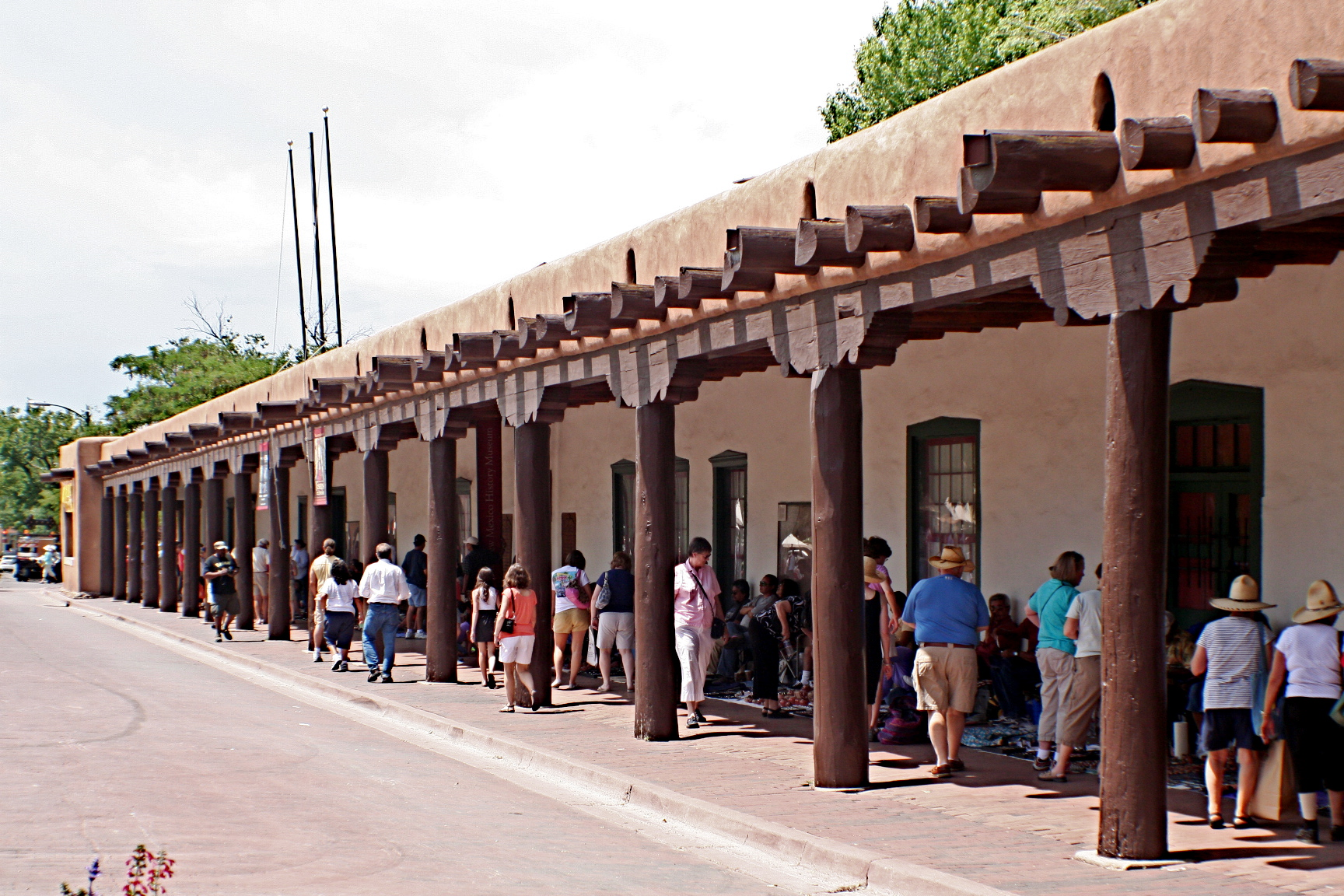
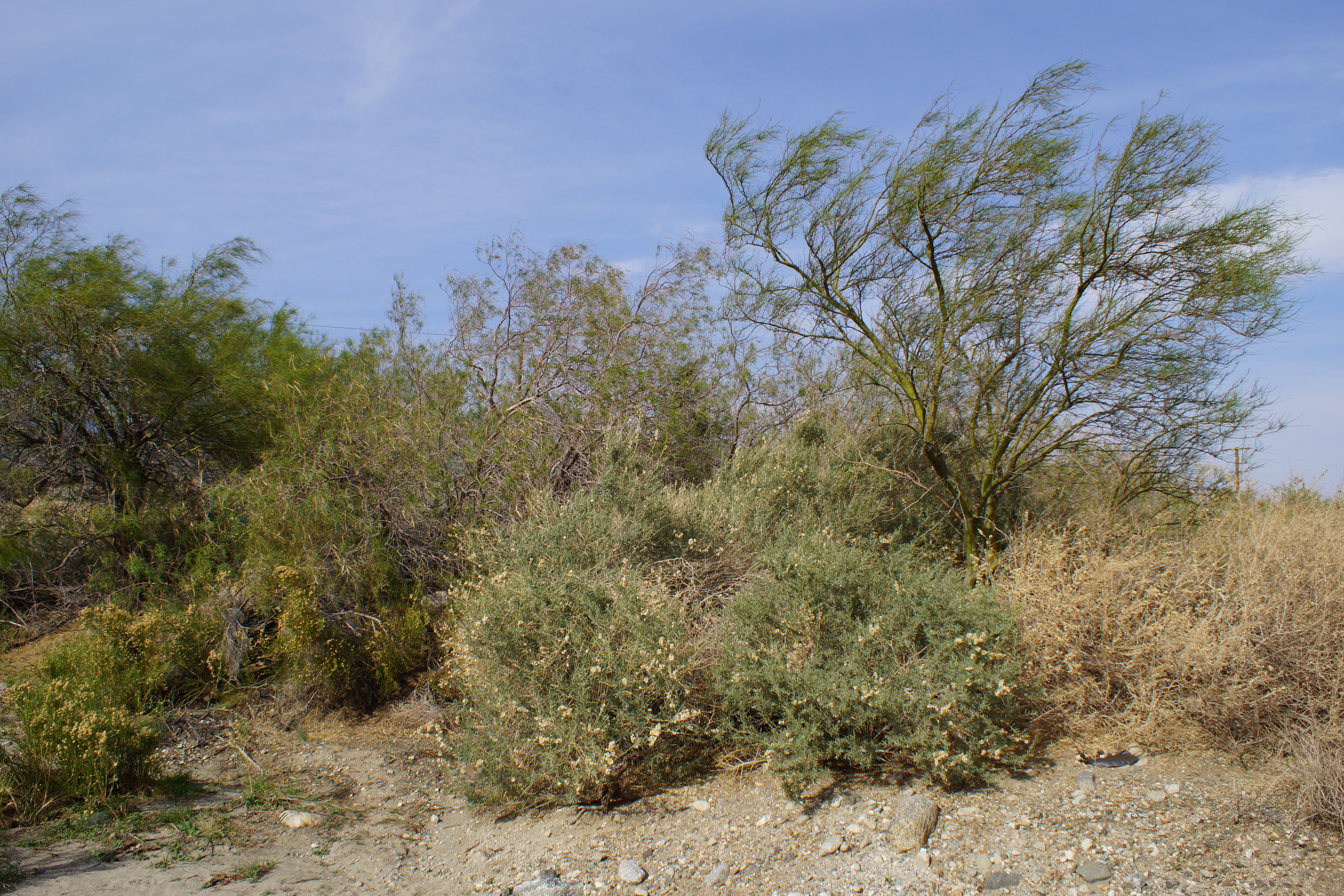
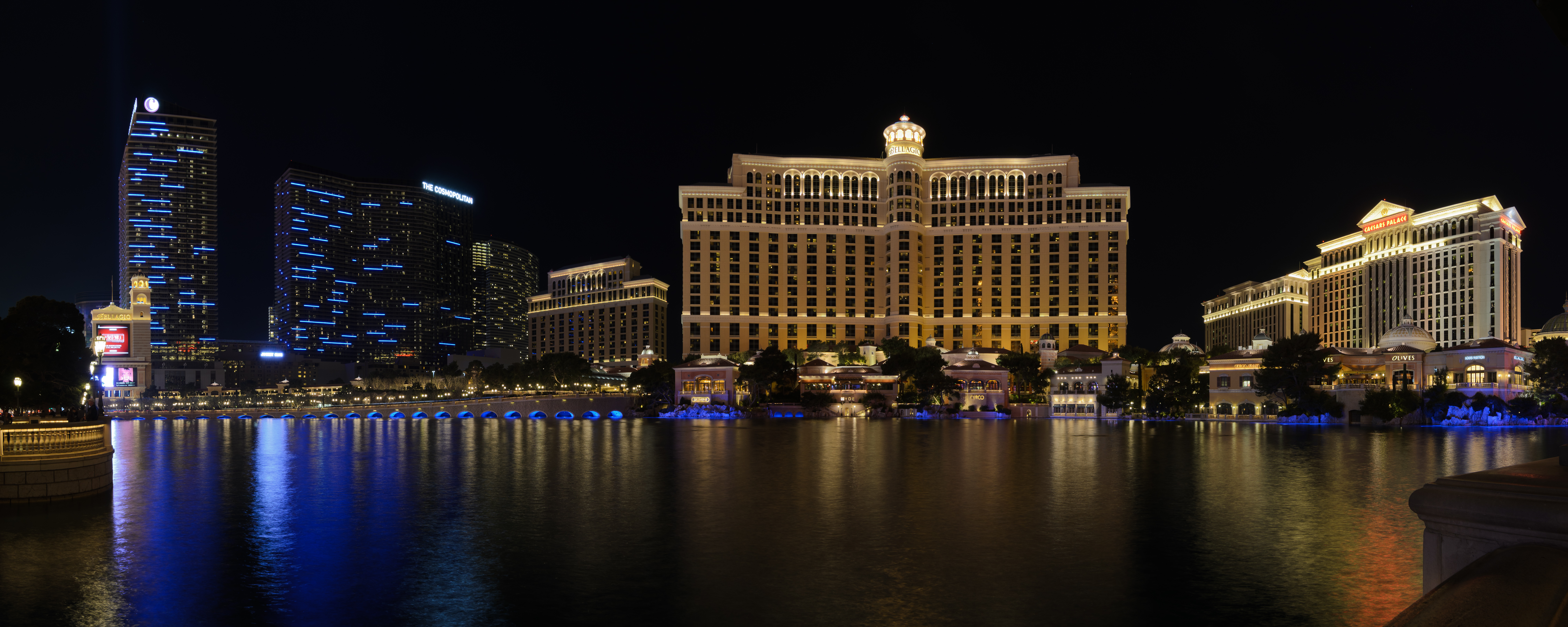
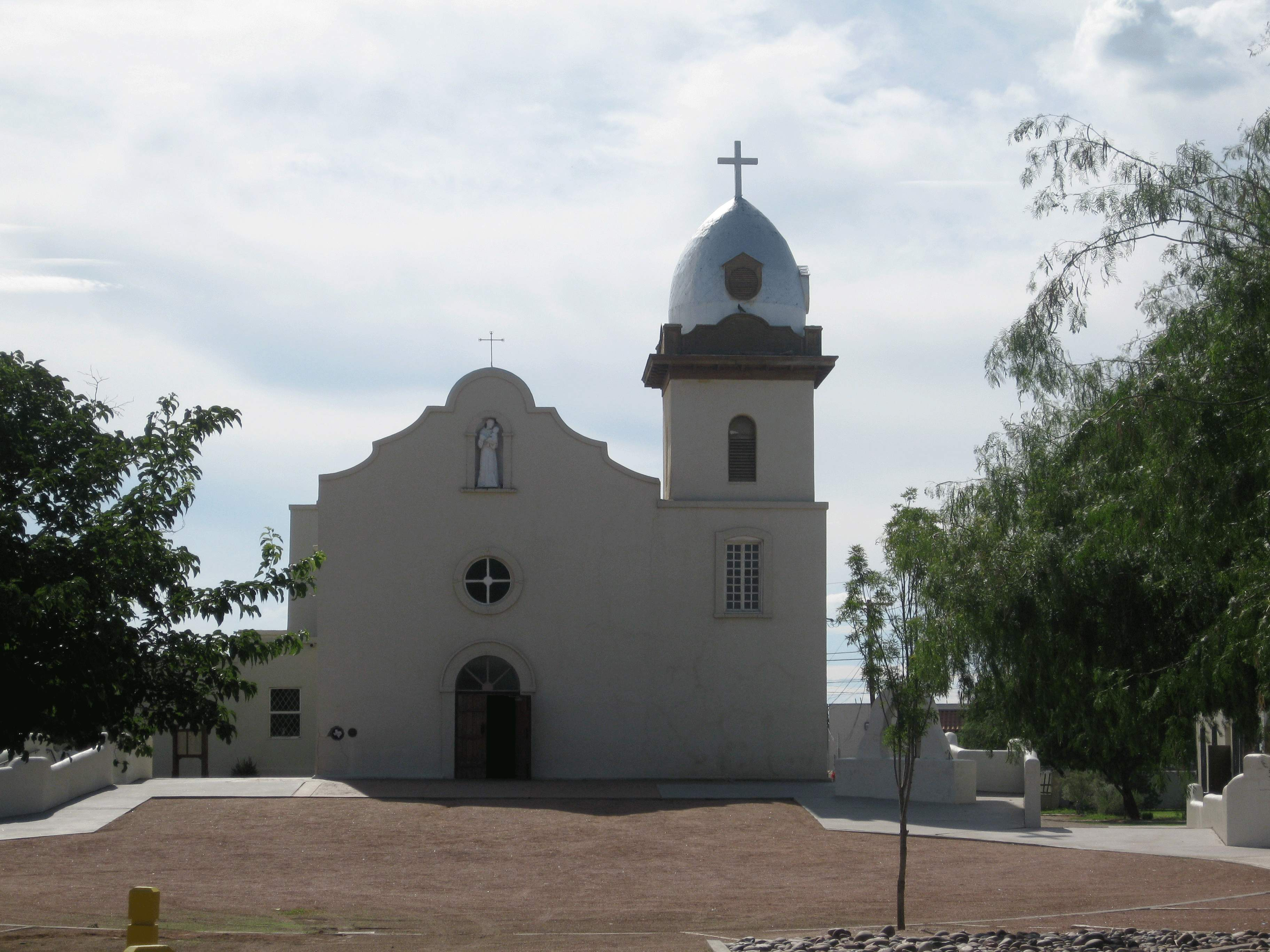
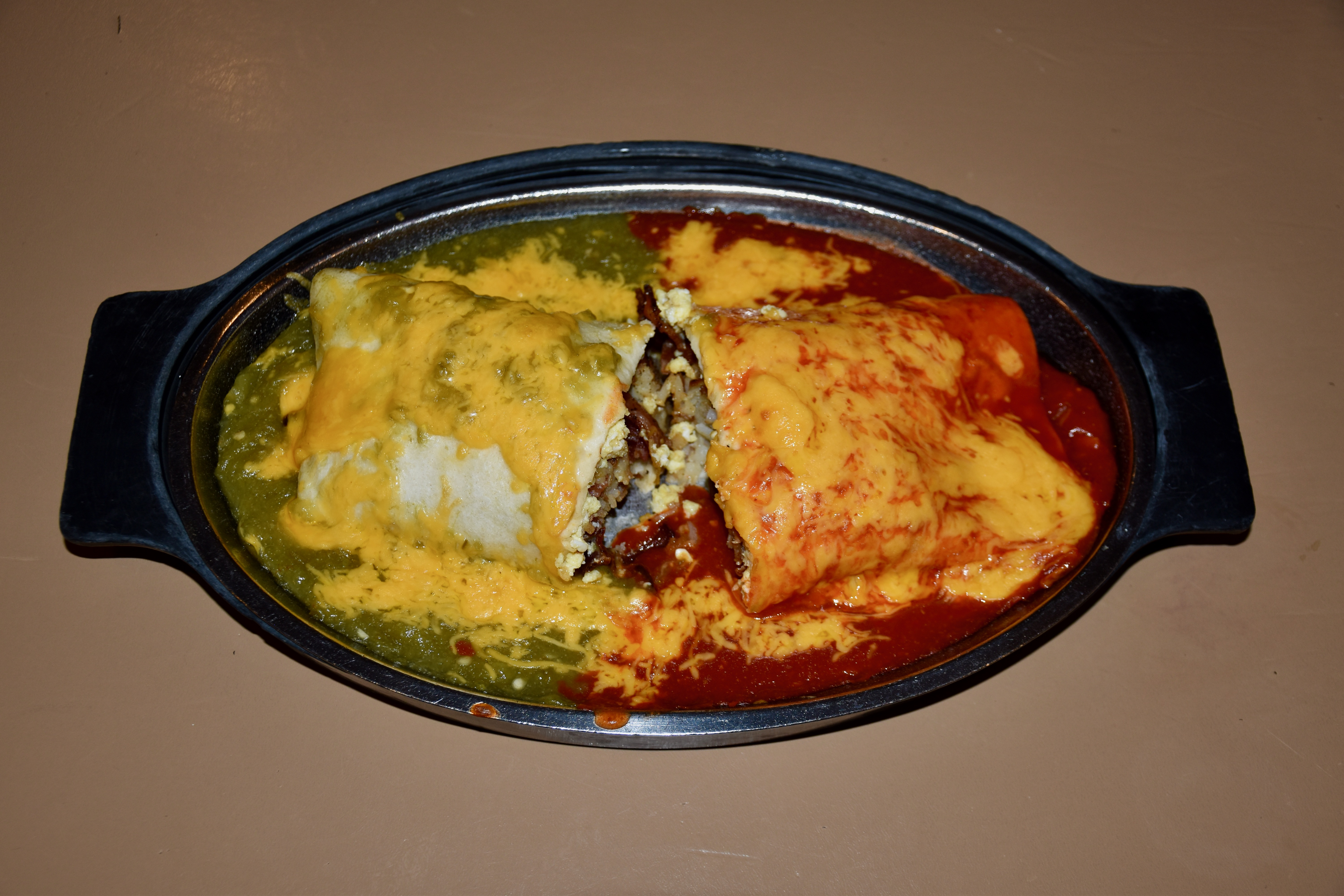
- Downtown Phoenix, Arizona Monument Valley, Arizona Cathedral Rock – Sedona, Arizona Route 66 in downtown Albuquerque, New Mexico Rio Grande Bosque near Bernalillo, New Mexico Palace of the Governors in Santa Fe, New Mexico Hoover Dam Desert willow in the Mojave Desert Cosmopolitan, Bellagio, and Caesars Palace on the Las Vegas Strip, Nevada Ysleta Mission in El Paso, Texas New Mexican style breakfast burrito

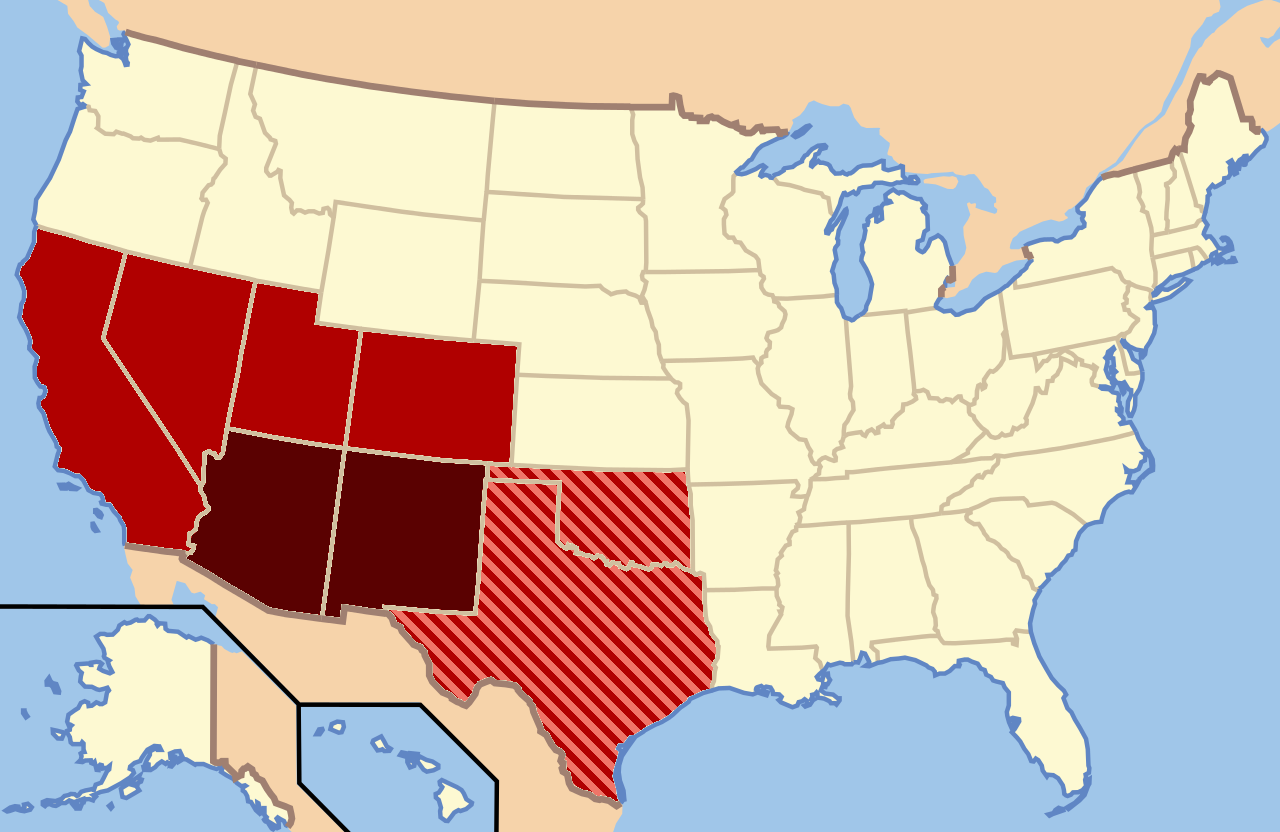
- Though regional definitions vary from source to source, Arizona and New Mexico (in dark red) are almost always considered the core, modern-day Southwest. The brighter red and striped states may or may not be considered part of this region. The brighter red states (California, Nevada, Utah, and Colorado) are also classified as part of the West by the U.S. Census Bureau, though the striped states are not; Texas and Oklahoma are classified as part of the South.
- Coordinates: 37°N 111°W
- Country: United States
- States: Core: Arizona; New Mexico; Others, depending on boundaries used: California; Colorado; Nevada; Utah; Oklahoma; Texas
- Largest city: Phoenix
- Largest metro: Phoenix metropolitan area

The Southwestern United States, also known as the American Southwest or simply the Southwest, is a geographic and cultural region of the United States that includes Arizona and New Mexico, along with adjacent portions of California, Colorado, Nevada, Oklahoma, Texas, and Utah. The largest cities by metropolitan area are Phoenix, Las Vegas, El Paso, Albuquerque, and Tucson. Before 1848, in the historical region of Santa Fe de Nuevo México as well as parts of Alta California and Coahuila y Tejas, settlement was almost non-existent outside of New Mexico's pueblos and Spanish or Mexican municipalities. Much of the area had been a part of New Spain and Mexico until the United States acquired the area through the Treaty of Guadalupe Hidalgo in 1848 and the smaller Gadsden Purchase in 1854.

While the region's boundaries are not officially defined, there have been attempts to do so. One such definition is from the Mojave Desert in California in the west (117° west longitude) to Carlsbad, New Mexico, in the east (104° west longitude); another says that it extends from the Mexico–United States border in the south to the southern areas of Colorado, Utah, and Nevada in the north (39° north latitude). In another definition, the core Southwestern U.S. includes only the states of Arizona and New Mexico; others focus on the land within the old Spanish and Mexican borders of the Nuevo México Province or the later American New Mexico Territory.

Distinct elements of the Western lifestyle thrive in the region, such as Western wear and Southwestern cuisines, including Native American, New Mexican, and Tex-Mex, or various genres of Western music like Indigenous, New Mexico, Bluegrass, and Tejano music styles. Likewise with the sought-after Southwestern architectural styles in the region inspired by blending Pueblo and Territorial styles, with Mediterranean Revival, Spanish Colonial architecture, Mission Revival architecture, Pueblo Deco, and Ranch-style houses in the form of the amalgamated Pueblo Revival and Territorial Revival architectures. This is due to the region's caballero heritage of the Native American (especially Apache, Pueblo, and Navajo), Hispano, Mexican American, and frontier cowboy.

== Regional geography ==
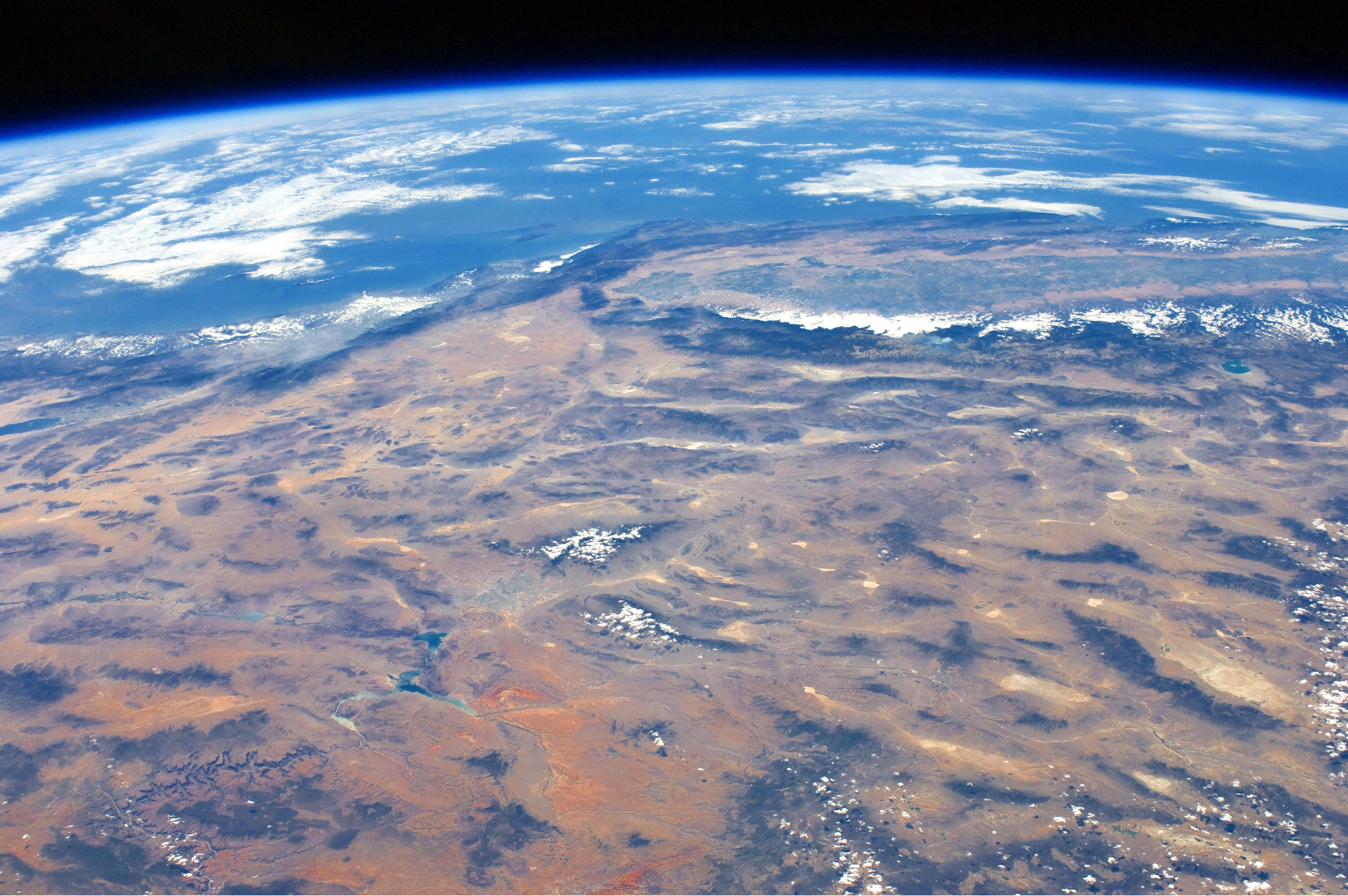
Panoramic view of the southwestern United States

The geography of the region is mainly made up of four features: the Mojave, Sonoran, and Chihuahuan Deserts, and the Colorado Plateau; although there are other geographical features as well, such as a portion of the Great Basin Desert. The deserts dominate the southern and western reaches of the area, while the plateau (which is largely made up of high desert) is the main feature north of the Mogollon Rim. The two major rivers of the region are the Colorado River, running in the northern and western areas, and the Rio Grande, running in the east, north to south.

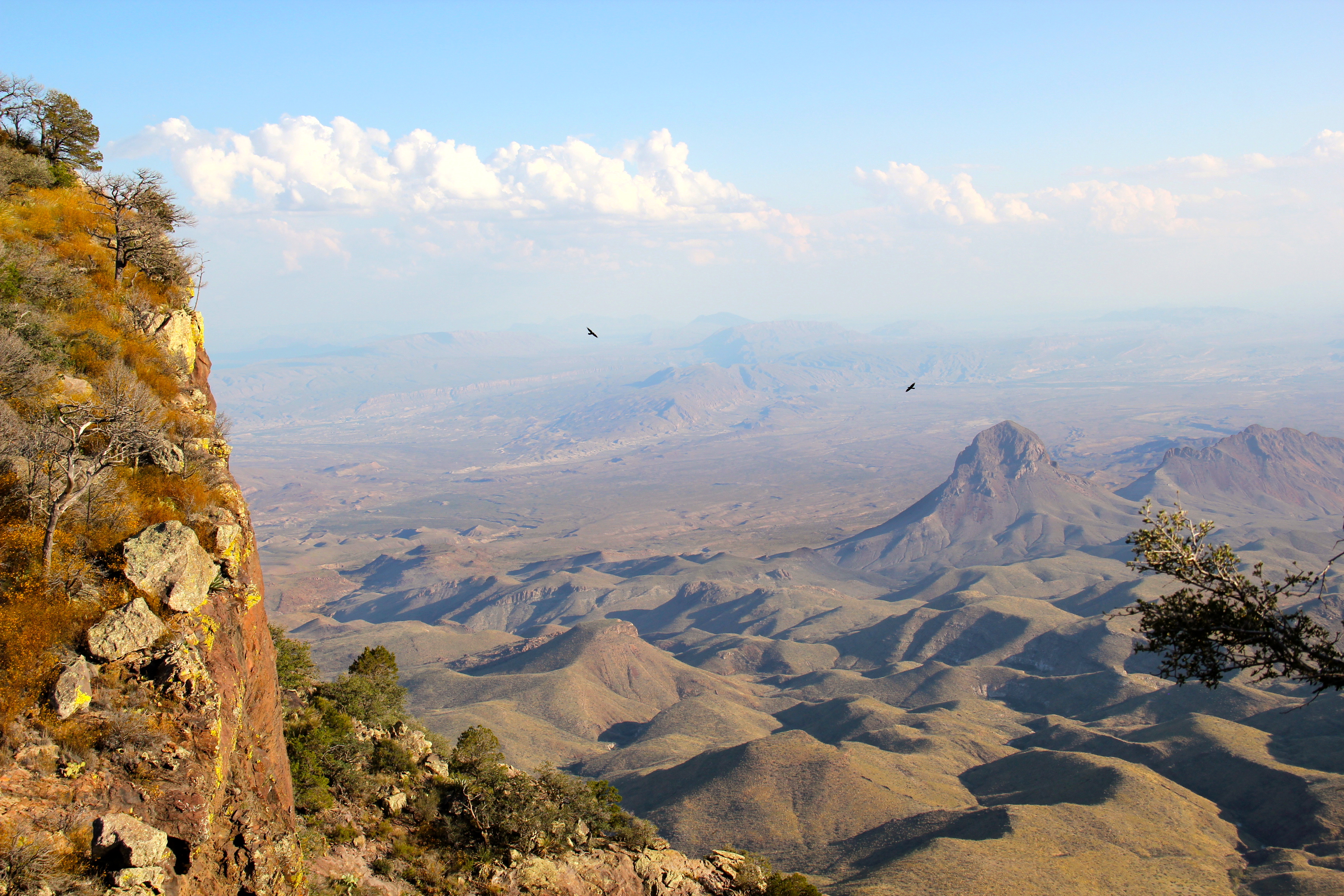
The Chihuahuan desert terrain mainly consists of basins broken by numerous small mountain ranges.

Formed approximately 8000 years ago, the Chihuahuan Desert is a relatively dry desert, although it is slightly wetter than the Sonoran Desert to the west. The Chihuahuan Desert spreads across the southeastern portion of the region, covering from southeastern Arizona, across southern and central New Mexico, and the portion of western Texas included in the Southwest. While it is the second-largest desert in the United States, only a third of the desert is within the United States, with the rest in Mexico. El Paso and Albuquerque are the major US cities in this desert, with other smaller cities being Las Cruces and Roswell in New Mexico and Willcox in Arizona.

The elevation in the Chihuahuan Desert varies from about 1,750 to 6,000 feet (500 to 1,800 meters), as well as several larger mountain ranges within or bordering this desert including the Black Range, Organ Mountains, Capitan Mountains, Manzano Mountains, Sacramento Mountains, Sandia Mountains, Magdalena Mountains, and Chiracahua Mountains, plus many smaller mountain ranges contained in the area, namely the Animas, San Andres, Guadalupe Mountains, and Doña Ana Mountains in New Mexico; and the Franklin, Hueco, and Davis Mountains in Texas. It also reaches up into the foothills of the higher ranges such as the Black Range and Oscura Mountains in New Mexico. High above the desert, these forest-covered and sometimes snow-capped mountains form sky islands, with radically different flora and fauna than the surrounding desert below. The sky islands also supply the surrounding desert foothills with flowing water during the spring runoff and after the summer storms of the New Mexican monsoon season. The Chihuahuan is a "rain shadow" desert, formed between two mountain ranges (the Sierra Madre Occidental on the west and the Sierra Madre Oriental on the east) which block oceanic precipitation from reaching the area. The Chihuahuan Desert is considered the "most biologically diverse desert in the Western Hemisphere and one of the most diverse in the world", and includes more species of cacti than any other desert in the world. The most prolific plants in this region are agave, yucca and creosote bushes, in addition to the ubiquitous presence of various cacti species.

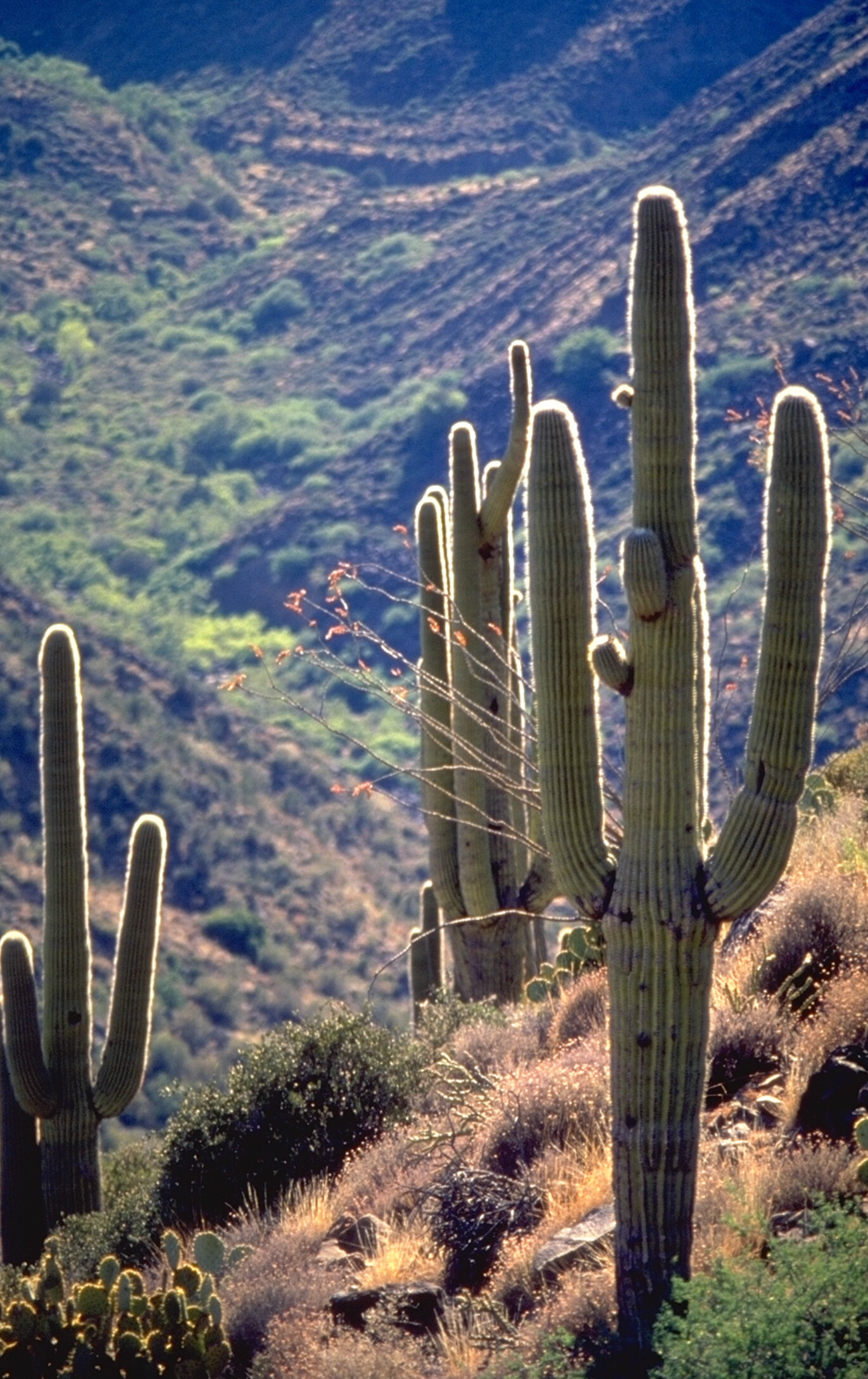
Saguaro cactus in the Sonoran Desert.

When people think of the desert southwest, the landscape of the Sonoran Desert is what mostly comes to mind. The Sonoran Desert makes up the southwestern portion of the Southwest; most of the desert lies in Mexico, but its United States component lies on the southeastern border of California, and the western 2/3 of southern Arizona. Rainfall averages between 4 and 12 in (100 and 300 mm) per year. Its most widely known inhabitant is the saguaro cactus, which is unique to the Sonoran. It is bounded on the northwest by the Mojave Desert, to the north by the Texas Plateau and to the east by the Arizona Mountains forests and the Chihuahuan Desert. Aside from the trademark saguaro, the desert has the most diverse plant life of any desert in the world, and includes many other species of cacti, including the organ-pipe, senita, prickly pear, barrel, fishhook, hedgehog, cholla, silver dollar, and jojoba. The portion of the Sonoran Desert which lies in the Southwestern United States is the most populated area within the region. Six of the top ten major population centers of the region are found within its borders: Phoenix, Tucson, Mesa, Chandler, Glendale, and Scottsdale, all in Arizona. Also within its borders are Yuma and Prescott, Arizona.

The most northwest portion of the American Southwest is covered by the Mojave Desert. Bordered on the south by the Sonoran Desert and the east by the Colorado Plateau, its range within the region makes up the southeast tip of Nevada, the southwestern corner of Utah and the northwestern corner of Arizona. In terms of topography, the Mojave is very similar to the Great Basin Desert, which lies just to its north. Within the region, Las Vegas is the most populous city; other significant population centers include Laughlin and Pahrump in Nevada, St. George and Hurricane in Utah, and Lake Havasu City, Kingman, and Bullhead City in Arizona. The Mojave is the smallest, driest and hottest desert within the United States. The Mojave gets less than 6 in (150 mm) of rain annually, and its elevation ranges from 3,000 to 6,000 feet (900 to 1,800 meters) above sea level. The most prolific vegetation is the tall Joshua tree, which grow as tall as 40 ft (12 m), and are thought to live almost 1000 years. Other major vegetation includes the Parry saltbush and the Mojave sage, both only found in the Mojave, as well as the creosote bush.

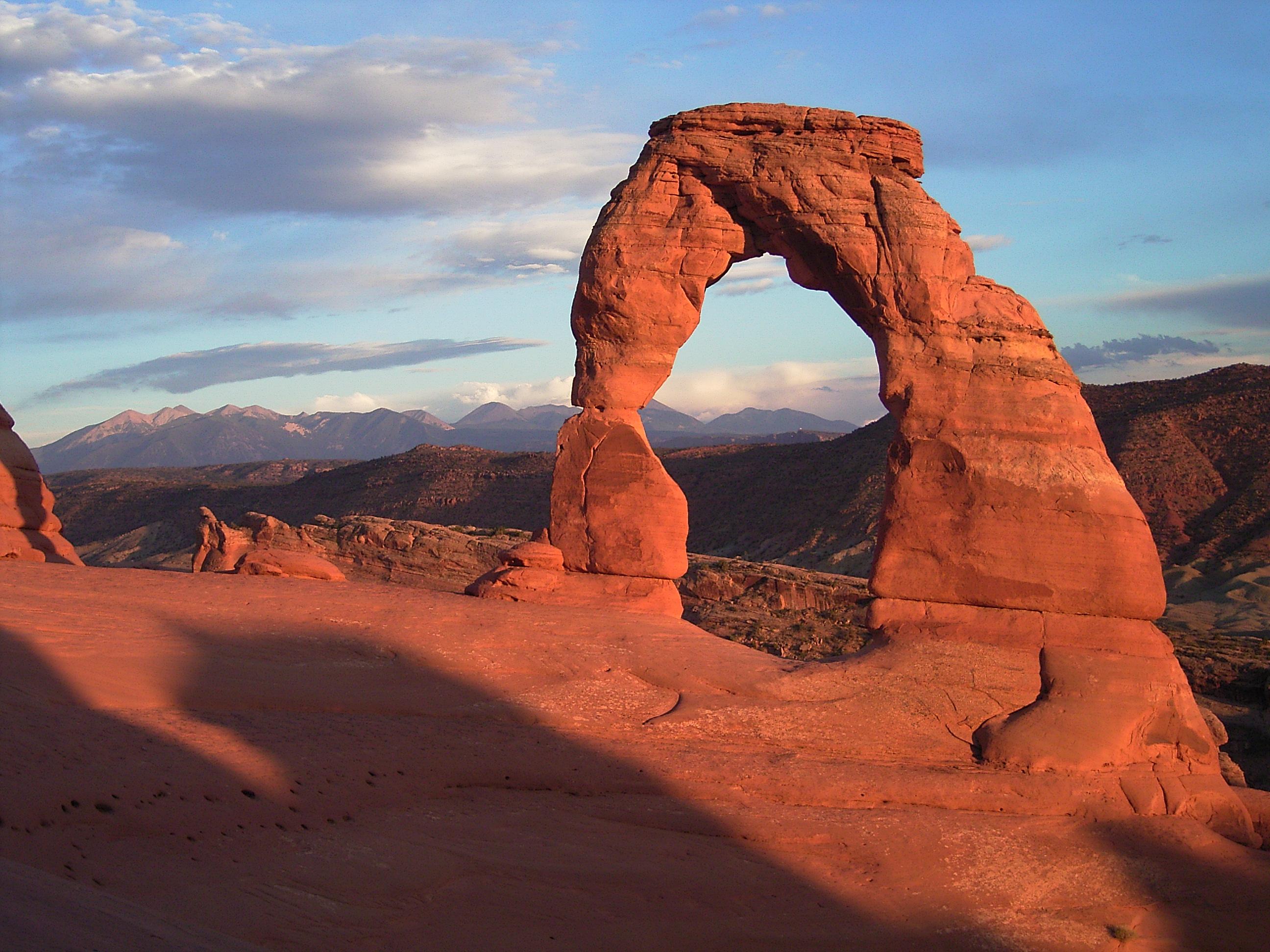
The Delicate Arch at Arches National Park

The Colorado Plateau varies from the large stands of forests in the west, including the largest stand of ponderosa pine trees in the world, to the Mesas to the east. The Colorado Plateau consists mostly of high desert. Within the Southwest U.S. region, the Colorado is bordered to the south by the Mogollon Rim and the Sonoran Desert, to the west by the Mojave Desert, and to the east by the Rocky Mountains, the Rio Grande Rift valley, and the Llano Estacado. The Plateau is characterized by a series of plateaus and mesas, interspersed with canyons. The most dramatic example is the Grand Canyon. But that is one of many dramatic vistas included within the Plateau, which includes spectacular lava formations, "painted" deserts, sand dunes, and badlands. One of the most distinctive features of the Plateau is its longevity, having come into existence at least 500 million years ago. The Plateau can be divided into six sections, three of which fall into the Southwest region. Beginning with the Navajo section forming the northern boundary of the Southwestern United States, which has shallower canyons than those in the Canyonlands section just to its north; the Navajo section is bordered to the south by the Grand Canyon section, which of course is dominated by the Grand Canyon; and the southeasternmost portion of the Plateau is the Datil section, consisting of valleys, mesas, and volcanic formations. Albuquerque is the most populous city often considered at the edge of this portion contained in the Southwest region, but Santa Fe, New Mexico and Flagstaff, Arizona, are also significant population centers.

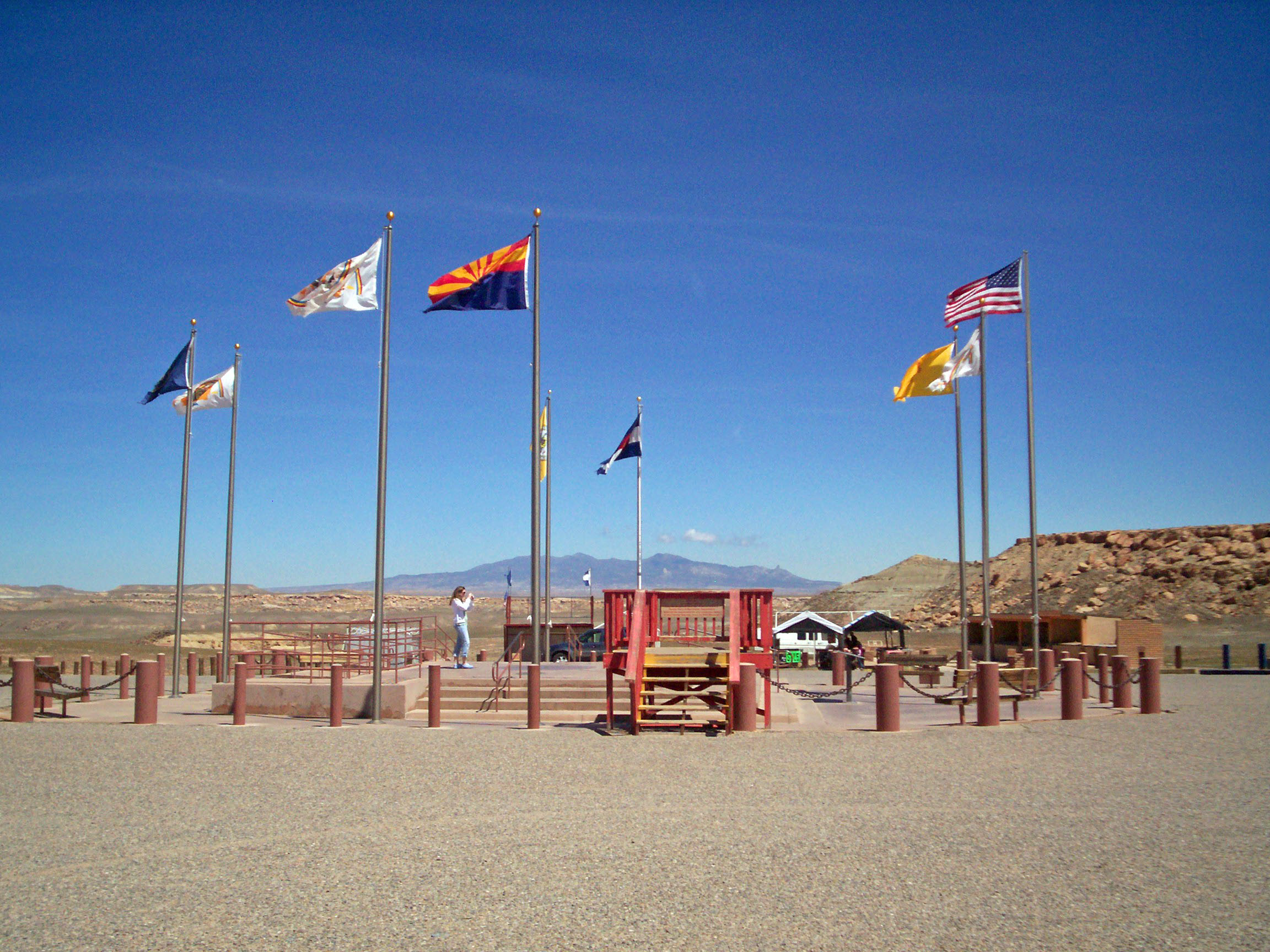
Four Corners Monument

Phoenix, Tucson, and Las Vegas dominate the westernmost metropolitan areas in the Southwest, while Albuquerque-Santa Fe and El Paso-Las Cruces dominate the easternmost metropolitan areas.

== History ==
=== Pre-European contact ===
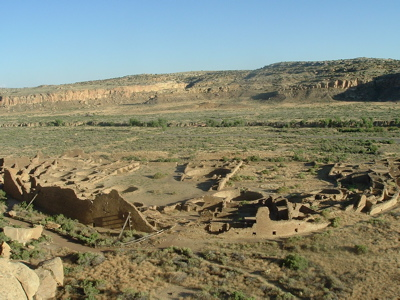
Ancestral Puebloan ruins at Chaco Canyon

Human history in the Southwest begins between 19,000 and 21,000 years BCE (21,000 to 23,000 years before present), with a group of likely hunter-gatherers whose presence is recorded in the White Sands footprints. No material culture from this group is known. Material culture remains in the Southwest appear with the arrival of the Clovis culture, a Paleo-Indian hunter-gatherer culture which arrived sometime around 9000 BCE. Clovis culture gave way to the Folsom tradition in New Mexico. The Clovis and Folsom technological cultures eventually were replaced by a diversification of cultural traditions leading to the rise of the three primary Pre-Columbian Indian cultures of the Southwest: the Ancestral Pueblo people, the Hohokam, and the Mogollon, all of which existed among other surrounding cultures including the Patayan and Sinagua. Maize was first cultivated in the region sometime during the early first millennium BC, but it took several hundred years for the native cultures to become dependent on it as a food source. As their dependence on maize grew, Pre-Columbian Indians began developing irrigation systems around 600 CE.

Map of Archaeological Culture Areas in the American Southwest and Mexico

Archaeological evidence suggests the Ancestral Pueblo people, sometimes referred to as the Anasazi, began settling the area in approximately 1500 BC. However, the term "Anasazi" is viewed by modern Pueblo people as derogatory and is increasingly disused. Eventually, the Ancestral Pueblo would spread throughout the entire northern section of the Southwest. This culture would go through several different eras lasting from approximately 1500 BC through the middle of the 15th century AD: the Basketmaker I, II, and III phases followed by the Pueblo I, II, III, and IV. As the Puebloans transitioned from a nomadic lifestyle to one based on both dry land and irrigated agriculture, their first domiciles were pithouses. The Mogollon culture developed later than the Puebloan, arising in the east at around 300 BC. Their range would eventually extend deep into what would become Mexico, and dominate the southeastern portion of the Southwest. Their settlements would evolve over time from pit-dwellings through pueblos and ultimately incorporate cliff-dwellings. The Hohokam were the last of these ancestral cultures to develop into a distinct cultural tradition, somewhere around AD 1, but became the most populous of the three by AD 1300, despite occupying the smallest territory of the three, covering most of the southwest portion. Beginning in approximately AD 600, the Hohokam began to develop an extensive series of irrigation canals; of the three major cultures in the Southwest, only the Ancestral Puebloans of the Chaco culture and the Hohokam developed irrigation as a means of watering their agriculture. The Hohokam were known for large settlements with ballcourts (likely associated with the Mesoamerican ballgame) and monumental architecture known as platform mounds.

A 21-year long drought beginning in AD 1275 caused a massive depopulation of the Ancestral Pueblo region and mass migration south into Hohokam and Mogollon areas, leaving large portions of the former Ancestral Pueblo region uninhabited. This led to significant cultural mixing of the three main Southwestern cultures and the rise of new artistic and technological forms as well as religious ideologies and cultural identities.

Around 1450, all three major cultures in the Southwest began to decline for unknown reasons, although severe drought and encroachment from other peoples have been postulated. By the end of the 15th century, population decline led to an abandonment of the many platform mound sites of the Hohokam and plaza-centered pueblos of the Mogollon, and ultimately demographic reorganization into fewer, larger pueblos (in the north and east) and low-density spread-out rancherias (in the west and south).

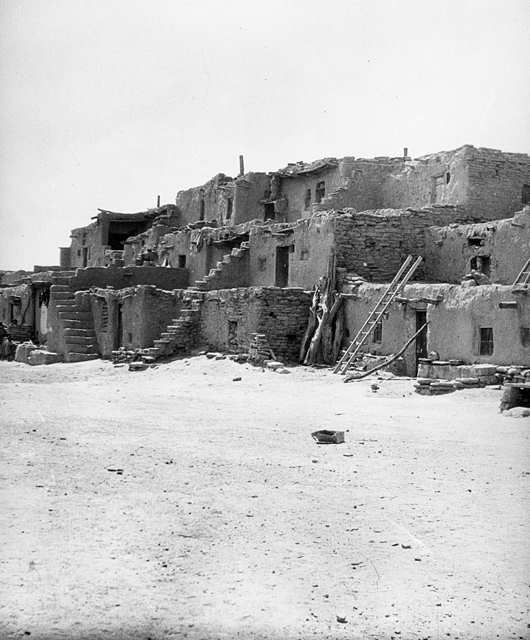
Oraibi pueblo

The area once occupied by the Ancestral Puebloans became inhabited by several American Indian tribes, the most populous of which before European contact were the Navajo, Ute, Southern Paiute, and Hopi. Navajo history states that around AD 1100 their culture began to develop in the Four Corners area of the region. The Navajos are an Athabaskan cultural group whose ancestors migrated from northwestern Canada and eastern Alaska, where the majority of Athabaskan speakers reside. The Apache, also an Athabaskan group, migrated into the American Southwest from the northern areas of North America at some point between 1200 and 1500 and spread farther south than the Navajo. They settled throughout New Mexico, eastern Arizona, northern Mexico, parts of western Texas, and southern Colorado. The Ute were historically found over most of modern-day Utah and Colorado, as well as northern New Mexico and Arizona. The Paiutes' traditional territory covered an area which covered over 45,000 square miles of southern Nevada and California, south-central Utah, and northern Arizona. The Hopi are descended from the ancestral Puebloans, aggregating on the mesas in central and western portions of northern Arizona. Their village of Oraibi, settled in approximately AD 1100, is, along with Acoma Sky City in New Mexico, one of the oldest continuously occupied settlements in the United States. The Zuni count their direct ancestry through the ancestral Puebloans. The modern-day Zuni established a culture along the Zuni River in far-eastern Arizona and western New Mexico. The modern Puebloan tribes of the Isleta, Sandia, Cochiti, Kewa, Santa Ana, Taos, Jemez, Acoma, Laguna, and Zia, as well as the Hopi and Zuni peoples, trace their ancestry back to the Ancestral Puebloans, while the Akimel O'odham and Tohono O'odham claim descent from Hohokam. Both major tribes of the O'odham spread out through southern and central Arizona, in the lands once controlled by their Hohokam ancestors. The area previously occupied by the Mogollon was taken over by an unrelated tribe, the Apache. While it is unclear whether any of the modern Native tribes of the Southwest are descended from the Mogollon, some archeologists and historians believe that they mixed with Ancestral Puebloans and became part of the modern Hopi and Zuni tribes.

=== Arrival of Europeans ===
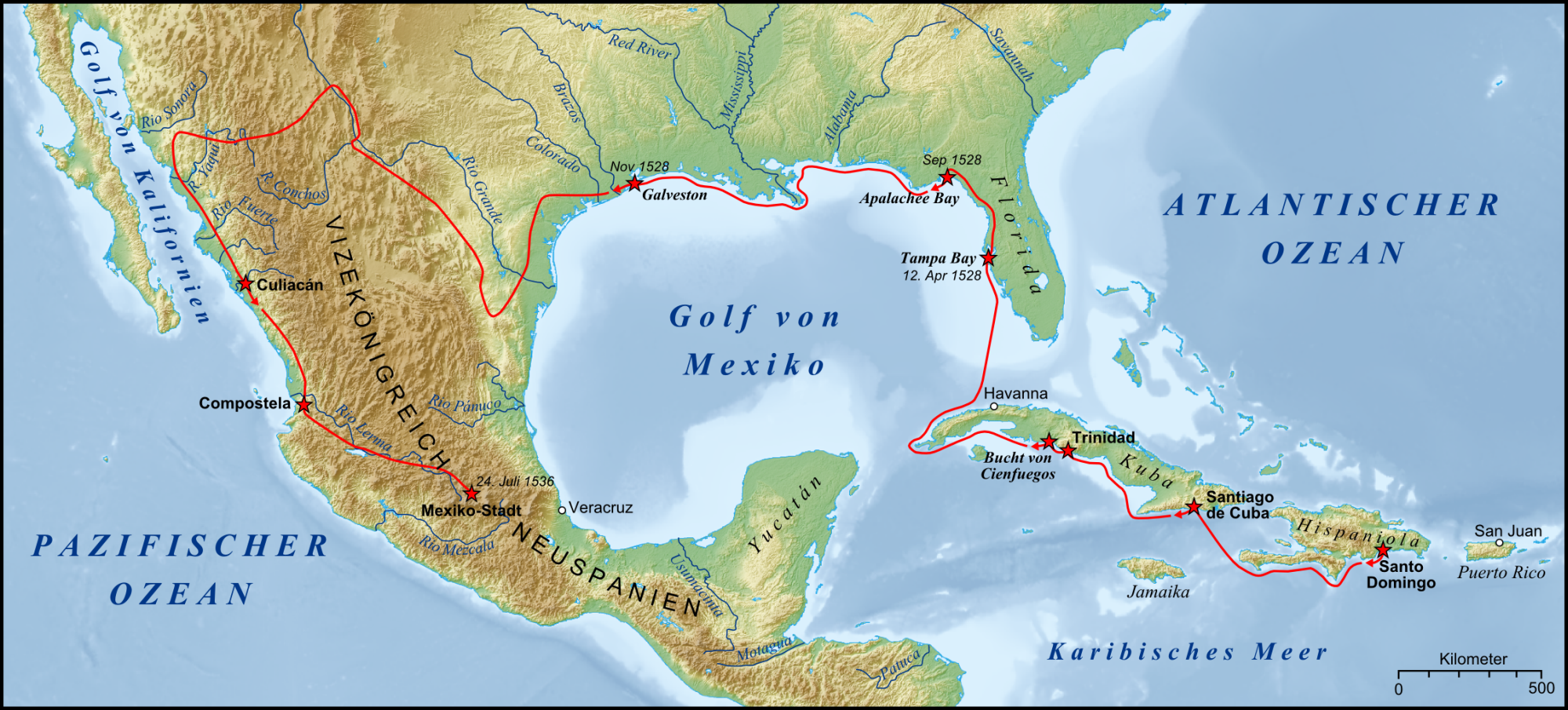
Narváez expedition (1528–36)

The first European intrusion into the region came from the south. In 1539, a Jesuit Franciscan named Marcos de Niza led an expedition from Mexico City which passed through eastern Arizona. The following year Francisco Vázquez de Coronado, based on reports from survivors of the Narváez expedition (1528–36) who had crossed eastern Texas on their way to Mexico City, led an expedition to discover the Seven Golden Cities of Cíbola. The 1582–3 expedition of Antonio de Espejo explored New Mexico and eastern Arizona; and this led to Juan de Oñate's establishment of the Spanish province of Santa Fe de Nuevo México in 1598, with a capital founded near Ohkay Oweenge Pueblo, which he called San Juan de los Caballeros. Oñate's party also attempted to establish a settlement in Arizona in 1599, but were turned back by inclement weather. In 1610, Santa Fe was founded, making it the oldest capital in United States.

In 1664 Juan Archuleta led an expedition into what is now Colorado, becoming the first European to enter. A second Spanish expedition was led into Colorado by Juan Ulibarrí in 1706, during which he claimed the Colorado territory for Spain.

From 1687 to 1691 the Jesuit priest Eusebio Kino established several missions in the Santa Cruz River valley; and Kino further explored southern and central Arizona in 1694, during which he discovered the ruins of Casa Grande. Beginning in 1732, Spanish settlers began to enter the region, and the Spanish started bestowing land grants in Mexico and the Southwest US. In 1751, the O'odham rebelled against the Spanish incursions, but the revolt was unsuccessful. In fact, it had the exact opposite effect, for the result of the rebellion was the establishment of the presidio at Tubac, the first permanent European settlement in Arizona.

In 1768, the Spanish created the Provincia de las Californias, which included California and the Southwest US. Over approximately the next 50 years, the Spanish continued to explore the Southwest, and in 1776 the City of Tucson was founded when the Presidio San Augustin del Tucson was created, relocating the presidio from Tubac.

In 1776, two Franciscan priests, Francisco Atanasio Domínguez and Silvestre Vélez de Escalante, led an expedition from Santa Fe heading to California. After passing through Colorado, they became the first Europeans to travel into what is now Utah. Their journey was halted by bad weather in October, and they turned back, heading south into Arizona before turning east back to Santa Fe.

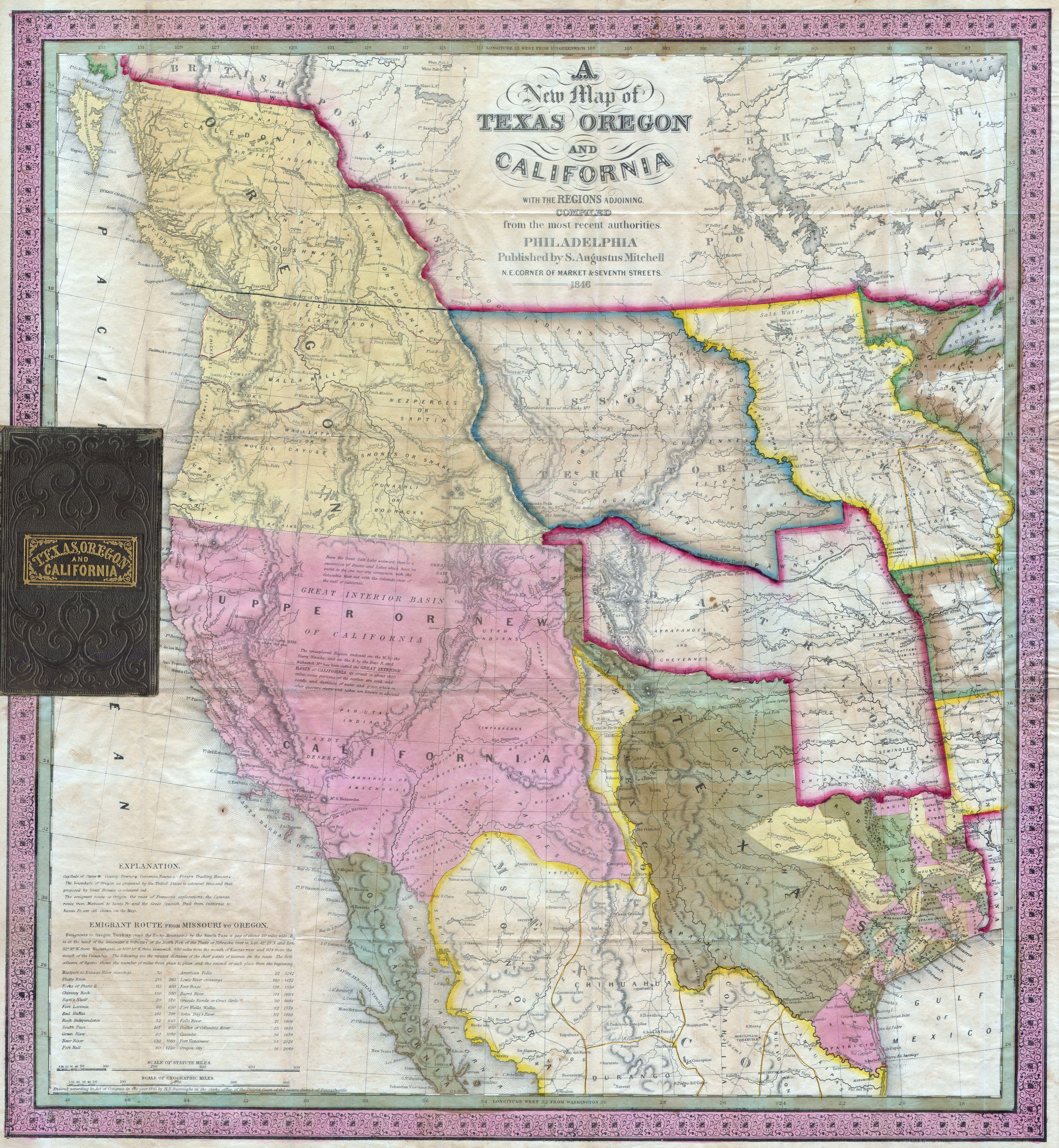
1846 map: Mexican Alta California (Upper California) in pink.

In 1804 Spain divided the Provincia de las Californias, creating the province Alta California, which consisted primarily of what would become California, Nevada, Arizona, Colorado, Utah and New Mexico. In 1821 Mexico achieved its independence from Spain and shortly after, in 1824, developed its constitution, which established the Alta California territory, which was the same geographic area as the earlier Spanish province.

In 1825, Arizona was visited by its first non-Spanish Europeans, English trappers. In 1836, the Republic of Texas, which contained the easternmost of the Southwest United States, won its independence from Mexico. In 1845 the Republic of Texas was annexed by the United States and immediately became a state, bypassing the usual territory phase. The new state still contained portions of what would eventually become parts of other states. In 1846, the Southwest became embroiled in the Mexican–American War, partly as a result of the United States' annexation of Texas. On August 18, 1846, an American force captured Santa Fe, New Mexico. On December 16 of the same year, American forces captured Tucson, Arizona, marking the end of hostilities in the Southwest United States. When the war ended with the Treaty of Guadalupe Hidalgo on February 2, 1848, the United States gained control of all of present-day California, Nevada and Utah, as well as the majority of Arizona, and parts of New Mexico and Colorado (the rest of present-day Colorado, and most of New Mexico had been gained by the United States in their annexation of the Republic of Texas). The final portion of the Southwestern United States came about through the acquisition of the southernmost parts of Arizona and New Mexico through the Gadsden Purchase in 1853.

In 1851, San Luis became the first European settlement in what is now Colorado.

=== Becoming states ===
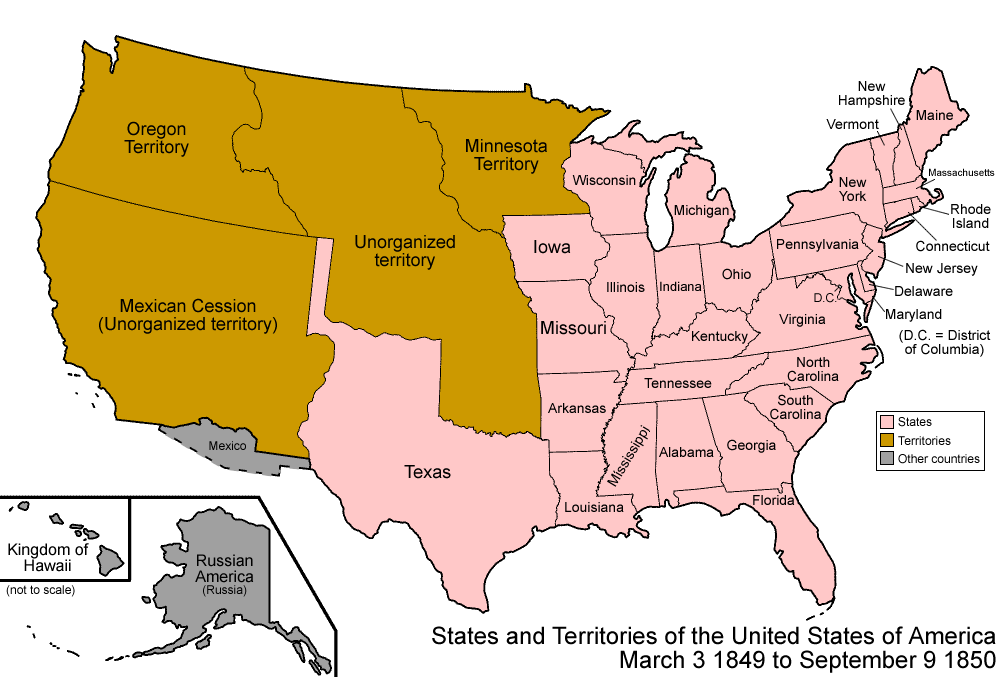
United States 1849–1850

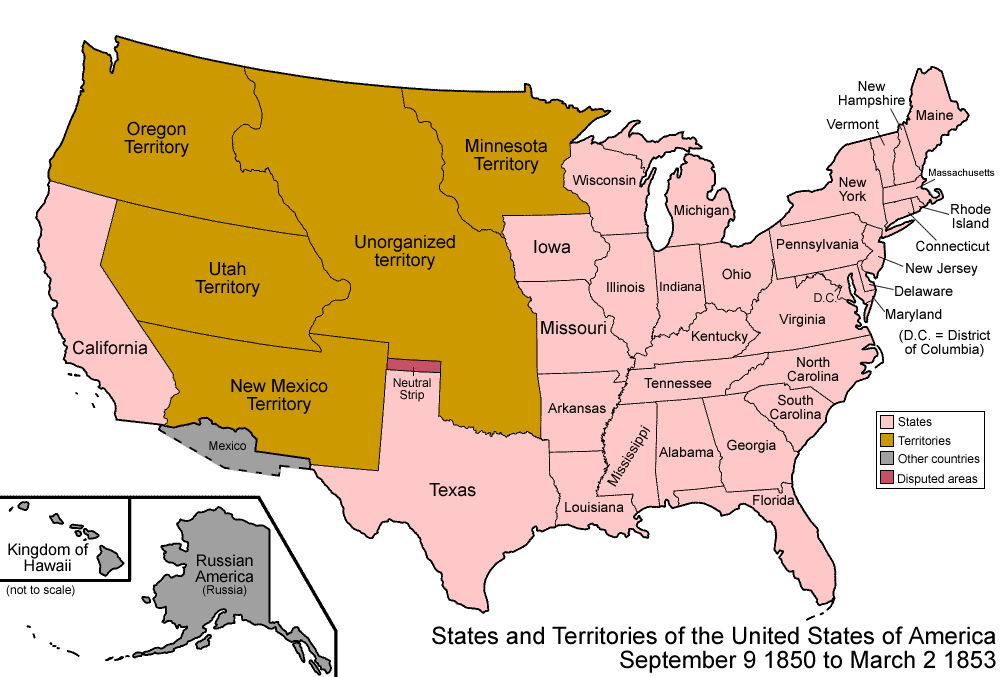
United States 1850–1853

Of the states of which at least a portion make up the Southwest, Texas was the first to achieve statehood. On December 29, 1845, the Republic of Texas was annexed, bypassing the status of becoming a territory, and immediately became a state. Initially, its borders included parts of what would become several other states: almost half of New Mexico, a third of Colorado, and small portions of Kansas, Oklahoma, and Wyoming. Texas current borders were set in the Compromise of 1850, where Texas ceded land to the federal government in exchange for $10 million, which would go to paying off the debt Texas had accumulated in its war with Mexico.

Following the Mexican Cession, the lands of what had been the Mexican territory of Alta California were in flux: portions of what is now New Mexico were claimed, but never controlled, by Texas. With the Compromise of 1850, the states of Texas and California were created (Texas as a slave state, and California as a free state), as well as the Utah Territory and New Mexico Territory. The New Mexico Territory consisted of most of Arizona and New Mexico (excluding a strip along their southern borders), a small section of southern Colorado, and the very southern tip of Nevada; while the Utah Territory consisted of Utah, most of Nevada, and portions of Wyoming and Colorado. The New Mexico Territory was expanded along its southern extent, to its current border, with the signing of the Gadsden Purchase Treaty on December 30, 1853, which was ratified by the U.S. Congress, with some slight alterations, in April 1854.

1860 Colorado Territory map

Utah Territory evolution 1850–1868

The Colorado Territory was organized on February 28, 1861, created out of lands then currently in the Utah, Kansas, Nebraska, and New Mexico territories. The Nevada Territory was also organized in 1861, on March 2, with land taken from the existing Utah Territory. Initially, only the western 2/3 of what is currently the State of Nevada was included in the territory, with its boundary to the east being the 39th meridian west from Washington, and to the south the 37th parallel. In 1862 Nevada's eastern border shifted to the 38th meridian west from Washington, and finally to its current position at the 37th meridian west from Washington in 1866. The boundary modification in 1866 also included adding the southern triangular tip of the present-day state, taken from the Arizona Territory.

From July 24–27, 1861 a Confederate force under the command of Lt. Colonel John Robert Baylor forced the surrender of the small Union garrison stationed at Fort Fillmore, near Mesilla, New Mexico. On August 1, 1861, Baylor declared the creation of the Arizona Territory, and claimed it for the Confederacy, with Mesilla as its capital. The territory, which had been formed by the portion of the existing New Mexico Territory below the 34th parallel, became official on February 14, 1862.

Confederate Arizona (outlined in blue)

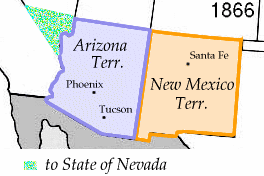
Split of Arizona and New Mexico territories, in 1866, after small portion ceded to Nevada

Nevada was admitted to the Union on October 31, 1864, becoming the 36th state. This was followed by the admittance to the Union of Colorado, which became the 38th state on August 1, 1876. Confederate Arizona was short-lived, however. By May 1862, Confederate forces had been driven out of the region by union troops. That same month a bill was introduced into the U.S. Congress, and on February 24, 1863 Abraham Lincoln signed the Arizona Organic Act, which officially created the U.S. Territory of Arizona, splitting the New Mexico Territory at the 107th meridian.

Utah, as shown above, evolved out of the Utah Territory, as pieces of the original territory created in 1850 were carved out: parts were ceded to Nevada, Wyoming, and Colorado in 1861; another section to Nevada in 1862; and the final section to Nevada in 1866. In 1890, the LDS church issued the 1890 Manifesto, which officially banned polygamy for members of the church. It was the last roadblock for Utah entering the Union, and on January 4, 1896, Utah was officially granted statehood, becoming the 45th state.

In 1869, John Wesley Powell led a 3-month expedition which explored the Grand Canyon and the Colorado River. In 1875, he would publish a book describing his explorations, Report of the Exploration of the Columbia River of the West and Its Tributaries, which was later republished as The Exploration of the Colorado River and Its Canyons.

In 1877 silver was discovered in southeastern Arizona. The notorious mining town of Tombstone, Arizona was born to service the miners. The town would become immortalized as the scene of what is considered the greatest gunfight in the history of the Old West, the Gunfight at the O.K. Corral.

Copper was also discovered in 1877, near Bisbee and Jerome in Arizona, which became an important component of the economy of the Southwest. Production began in 1880 and was made more profitable by the expansion of the railroad throughout the territory during the 1880s.

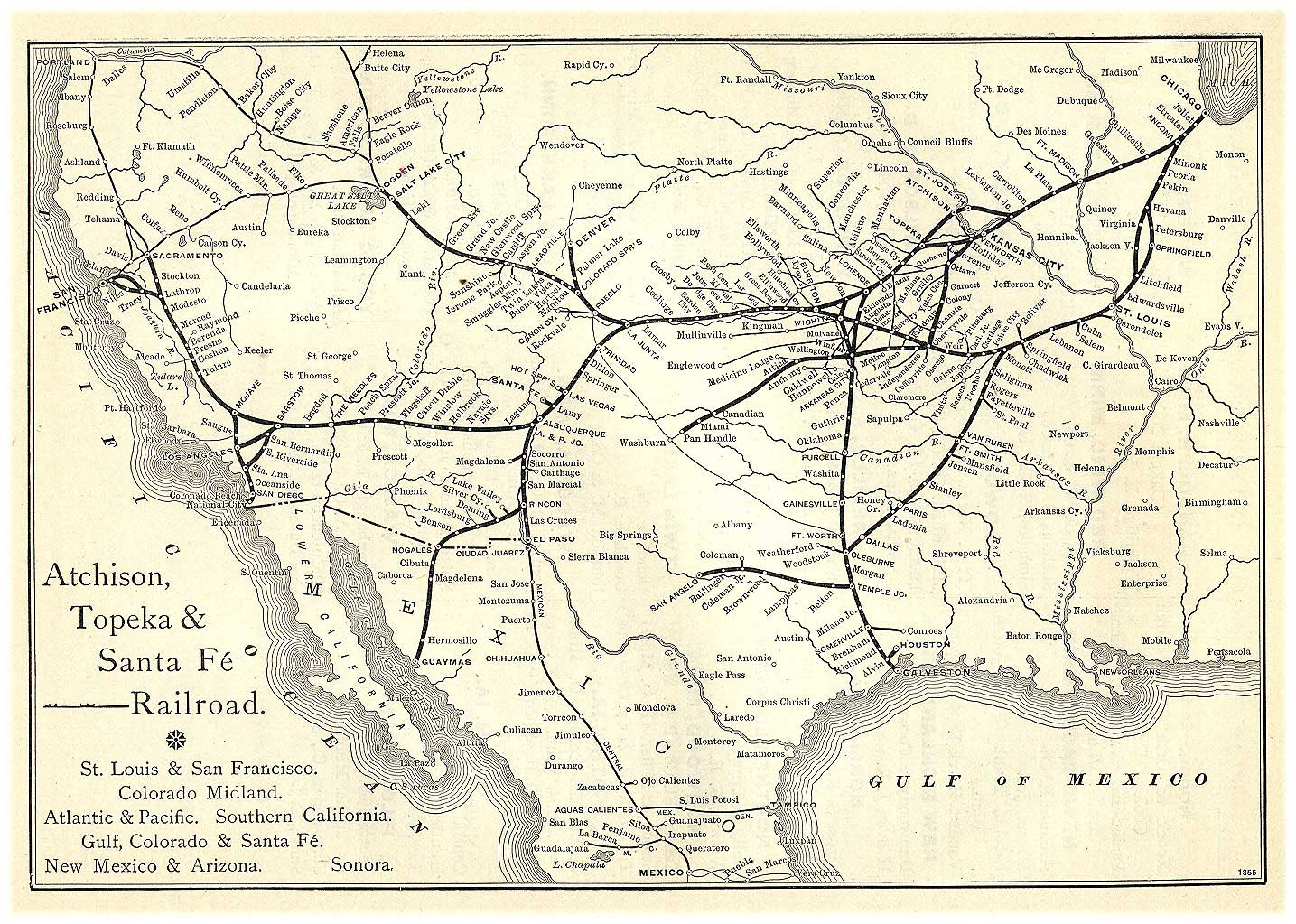
The second transcontinental railroad: the "Santa Fe Route" – 1891.

The early 1880s also saw the completion of the second transcontinental railroad, which ran through the heart of the Southwest, called the "Santa Fe Route". It ran from Chicago, down through Topeka, then further south to Albuquerque, before heading almost due west through northern Arizona to Los Angeles.

The repeal of the Sherman Silver Purchase Act in 1893 led to the decline of the silver mining industry in the region.

In 1901, the Santa Fe Railroad reached the South Rim of the Grand Canyon, opening the way for a tourism boom, a trend led by restaurant and hotel entrepreneur Fred Harvey.

The last two territories within the Southwest to achieve statehood were New Mexico and Arizona. By 1863, with the splitting off of the Arizona Territory, New Mexico reached its modern borders. They became states within forty days of one another. On January 6, 1912, New Mexico became the 47th state in the Union. Arizona would shortly follow, becoming the last of the 48 contiguous United States on February 14, 1912.

=== Since statehood ===
==== Ski industry ====
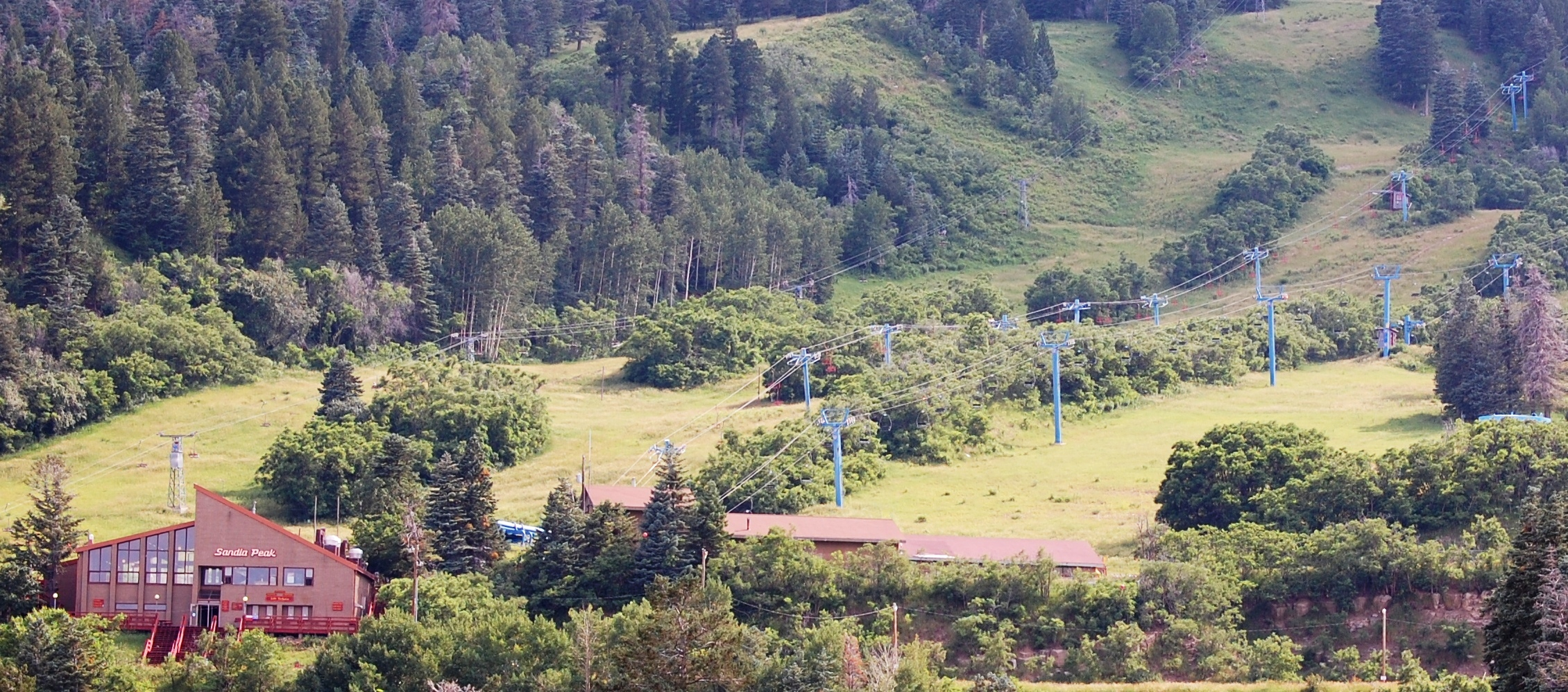
Sandia Peak Ski Area, New Mexico

The 1930s saw the beginning of the ski industry in the Southwest. Resorts were established in Colorado in areas such as Estes Park, Gunnison, and on Loveland Pass. New Mexico's oldest ski area is Sandia Peak Ski Area at the eastern edge of Albuquerque, which opened to skiers in 1936. At the end of the decade, in 1939, with the establishment of Alta Ski Area, Utah's skiing began to be developed.

Due to the ski conditions in the state, during WWII, the 10th Mountain Division established Camp Hale in Colorado to train elite ski troops.

== Origins of the term and historical/cultural variations ==
While this article deals with the core definition for the American Southwest, there are many others. The various definitions can be broken down into four main categories: Historical/Archeological; Geological/Topographical; Ecological; and Cultural. In the 1930s and 1940s, many definitions of the Southwest included all or part of Texas, Oklahoma, New Mexico, Arizona, California, Colorado, and Utah. As time has gone on, the definition of the Southwest has become more solidified and more compact. For example, in 1948 the National Geographic Society defined the American Southwest as all of California, Nevada, Utah, Arizona, Colorado, and New Mexico, and the southernmost sections of Oregon, Idaho, and Wyoming, as well as parts of southwest Nebraska, western Kansas, Oklahoma, and Texas. By 1977, the Society's definition had narrowed to only the four states of Utah, Arizona, Colorado, and New Mexico; and by 1982 the portion of the Southwest in the United States, as defined by the Society, had shrunk to Arizona and New Mexico, with the southernmost strip of Utah and Colorado, as well as the Mojave and Colorado deserts in California. Other individuals who focus on Southwest studies who favored a more limited extent of the area to center on Arizona and New Mexico, with small parts of surrounding areas, include Erna Fergusson, Charles Lummis (who claimed to have coined the term, the Southwest), and cultural geographer Raymond Gastil, and ethnologist Miguel León-Portilla.

Geographer D. W. Meinig defines the Southwest in a very similar fashion to Reed: the portion of New Mexico west of the Llano Estacado and the portion of Arizona east of the Mojave-Sonoran Desert and south of the "canyon lands" and also including the El Paso district of western Texas and the southernmost part of Colorado. Meinig breaks the Southwest down into four distinct subregions. He calls the first subregion "Northern New Mexico", and describes it as focused on Albuquerque and Santa Fe. It extends from the San Luis Valley of southern Colorado to south of Socorro and including the Sandia-Manzano Mountains, with an east–west breadth in the north stretching from the upper Canadian River to the upper San Juan River. The area around Albuquerque is sometimes called Central New Mexico.

"Central Arizona" is a vast metropolitan area spread across one contiguous sprawling oasis, essentially equivalent to the Phoenix metropolitan area. The city of Phoenix is the largest urban center, and located in the approximate center of the area that includes Tempe, Mesa, and many others.

Meinig calls the third subregion "El Paso, Tucson, and the Southern Borderlands". While El Paso and Tucson are distinctly different cities, they serve as anchor points to the hinterland between them. Tucson occupies a large oasis at the western end of the El Paso-Tucson corridor. The region between the two cities is a major transportation trunk with settlements serving both highway and railway needs. There are also large mining operations, ranches, and agricultural oases. Both El Paso and Tucson have large military installations nearby; Fort Bliss and White Sands Missile Range north of El Paso in New Mexico, and, near Tucson, the Davis-Monthan Air Force Base. About 70 miles (110 km) to the southeast are the research facilities at Fort Huachuca. These military installations form a kind of hinterland around the El Paso-Tucson region, and are served by scientific and residential communities such as Sierra Vista, Las Cruces, and Alamogordo. El Paso's influence extends north into the Mesilla Valley, and southeast along the Rio Grande into the Trans-Pecos region of Texas.

The fourth subregion Meinig calls the "Northern Corridor and Navajolands", a major highway and railway trunk which connects Albuquerque and Flagstaff. Just north of the transportation trunk are large blocks of American Indian land.

=== Historical/archeological ===
As the US expanded westward, the country's western border also shifted westward, and consequently, so did the location of the Southwestern and Northwestern United States. In the early years of the United States, newly colonized lands lying immediately west of the Appalachian Mountains were detached from North Carolina and given the name Southwest Territory. During the decades that followed, the region known as "the Southwestern United States" covered much of the Deep South east of the Mississippi River.

As territories and eventual states to the west were added after the Mexican–American War, the geographical "Southwest" expanded, and the relationship of these new acquisitions to the South itself became "increasingly unclear".

However, archeologist Erik Reed gives a description which is the most widely accepted as defining the American Southwest, which runs from Durango, Colorado in the north, to Durango, Mexico, in the south, and from Las Vegas, Nevada in the west to Las Vegas, New Mexico in the East. Reed's definition is roughly equivalent to the western half of the Learning Center of the American Southwest's definition, leaving out any portion of Kansas and Oklahoma, and much of Texas, as well as the eastern half of New Mexico. Since this article is about the Southwestern United States, the areas of Sonora and Chihuahua in Mexico will be excluded. The portion left includes Arizona and western New Mexico, the very southernmost part of Utah, southwestern Colorado, the very tip of west Texas, and triangle formed by the southern tip of Nevada. This will be the defined scope that is used in this article unless otherwise specified in a particular area.

=== Geological/topographical ===
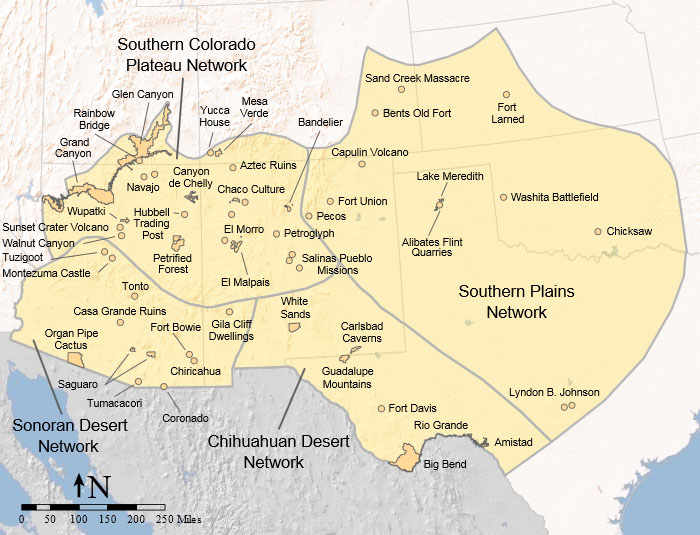
Map of the Southwestern United States as defined by the Learning Center of the American Southwest

Parts of the other states make up the various areas that can be included in the Southwest, depending on the source. The Learning Center of the American Southwest (LCAS) (Note: Quote:"The Learning Center of the American Southwest is a collaboration among 48 national park units in four NPS Inventory and Monitoring Networks, three Cooperative Ecosystem Studies Units (CESUs), and several nonprofit partners. This partnership is dedicated to understanding and preserving the unique resources of the American Southwest through science and education.") does not rely on current state boundaries, and defines the American Southwest as parts of Arizona, Colorado, Kansas, New Mexico, Oklahoma, Texas, and Utah. From this perspective, almost all of the region's physiographical traits, geological formations, and weather are contained within a box between 26° and 38° northern latitude, and 98° 30' and 124° western longitude.

=== Ecological ===
When looking at the fauna of the region, there is a broader definition of the American Southwest. The Southwestern Center for Herpetological Research defines the Southwest as being only the states of Arizona, New Mexico, with parts of California, Nevada, Texas, and Utah; although they include all of those six states in their map of the region, solely for ease of defining the border.

=== Cultural ===
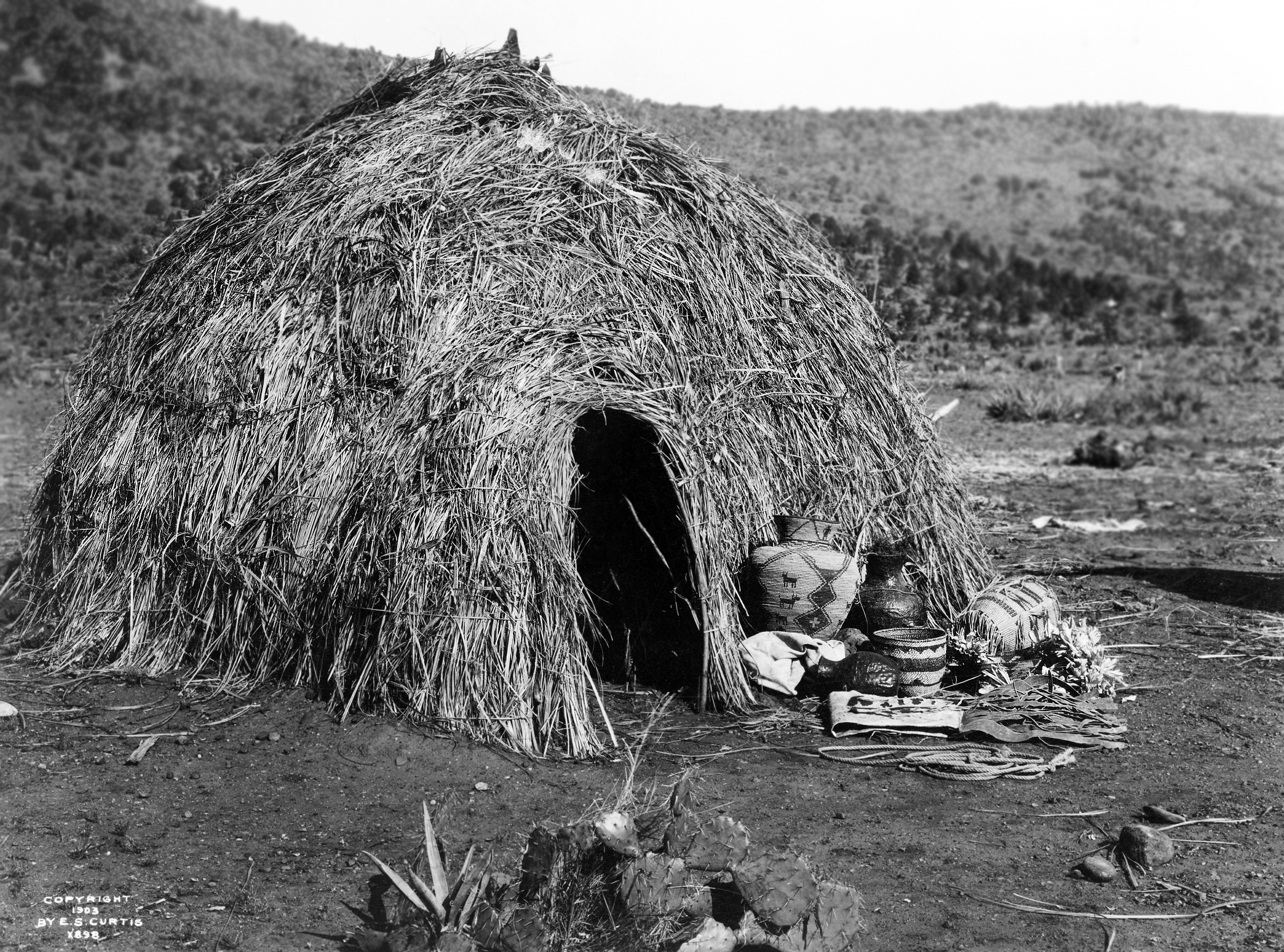
The Wigwam. A dwelling used by various Native American tribes among the Southwestern US.

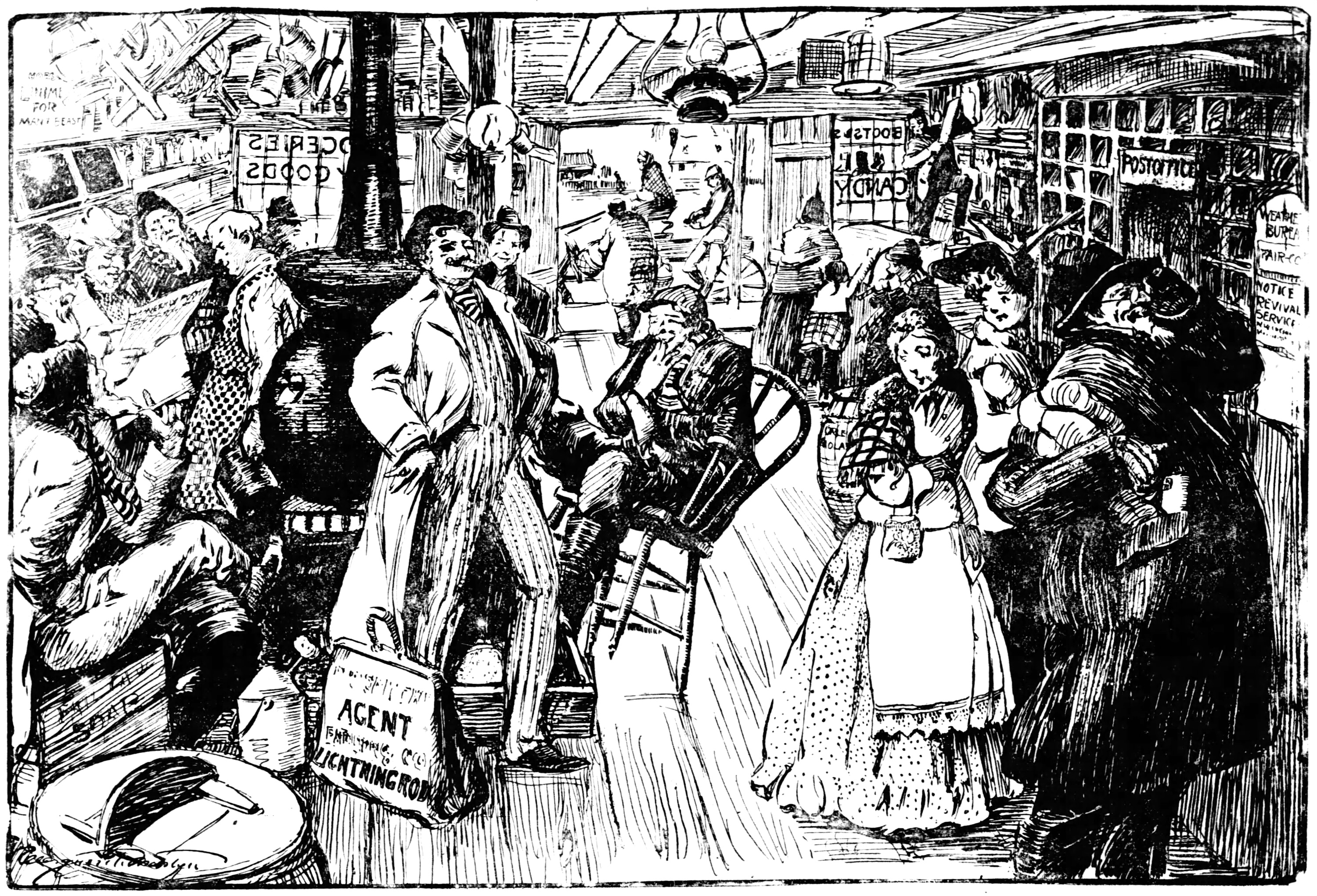
Fanciful drawing by Marguerite Martyn in the St. Louis Post-Dispatch of October 21, 1906, headed "Passing of the Country Store in the Southwest"

Lawrence Clark Powell, a major bibliographer whose emphasis is on the Southwest, defined the American Southwest in a 1958 Arizona Highways article as, "the lands lying west of the Pecos, north of the [Mexican] Border, south of the Mesa Verde and the Grand Canyon, and east of the mountains which wall off Southern California and make it a land in itself".

Texas has long been the focal point of this dichotomy, and is often considered, as such, the core area of "the South's Southwest". While the Trans-Pecos area is generally acknowledged as part of the desert Southwest, most of Texas and large parts of Oklahoma are often placed into a sub-region of the South, which some consider southwestern in the general framework of the original application, meaning the "Western South". This is an area containing the basic elements of Southern history, culture, politics, religion, and linguistic and settlement patterns, yet blended with traits of the frontier West. While this particular Southwest is notably different in many ways from the classic "Old South" or Southeast, these features are strong enough to give it a separate southwestern identity quite different in nature from that of the interior southwestern states to the west.

One of these distinguishing characteristics in Texas—in addition to having been a Confederate state during the Civil War—is that Indigenous and Spanish American culture never played a central role in the development of this area in relative comparison to the others, as the vast majority of settlers were Anglo and blacks from the South. Although the present-day state of Oklahoma was Indian Territory until the early 20th century, many of these American Indians were from the southeastern United States and became culturally assimilated early on. The majority of members of these tribes also allied themselves with the Confederacy during the Civil War. Combined with that, once the territory was open for settlement, southeastern pioneers made up a disproportionate number of these newcomers. All this contributed to the new state having a character that differed from other parts of the Southwest with large American Indian populations.

The fact that a majority of residents of Texas and Oklahoma—unlike those in other "southwestern" states—self-identify as living in the South and consider themselves southerners rather than the West and westerners—also lends to treating these two states as a somewhat distinct and separate entity in terms of regional classification.

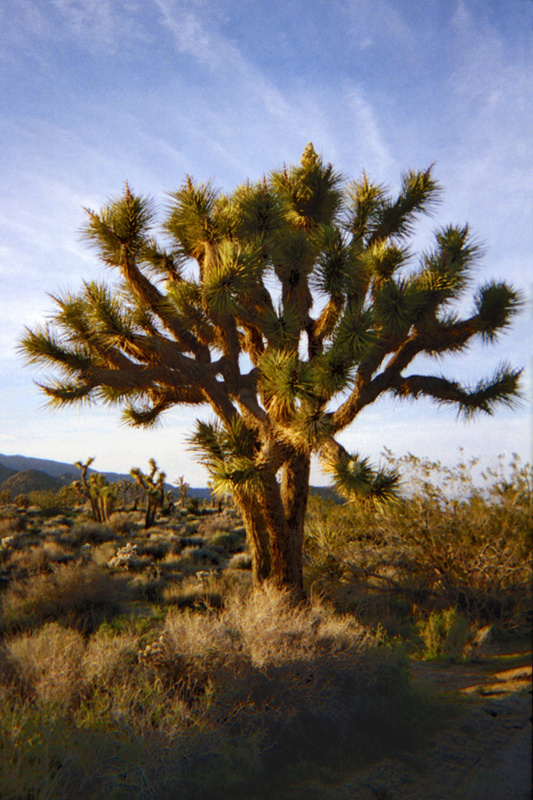
A Joshua tree (Yucca brevifolia)

== Vegetation and terrain ==
Vegetation of the southwest includes various types of yucca, along with saguaro cactus, barrel cactus, prickly pear cactus, desert spoon, creosote bush, sagebrush, and greasewood. Many native cacti grow throughout Nevada, Utah, Colorado, and west Texas. Steppe is also located all over the high plains areas in Colorado, New Mexico, and Texas. The mountains of the southwestern states have large tracts of alpine trees. There are also many pinyons and juniper species native to the southwest.

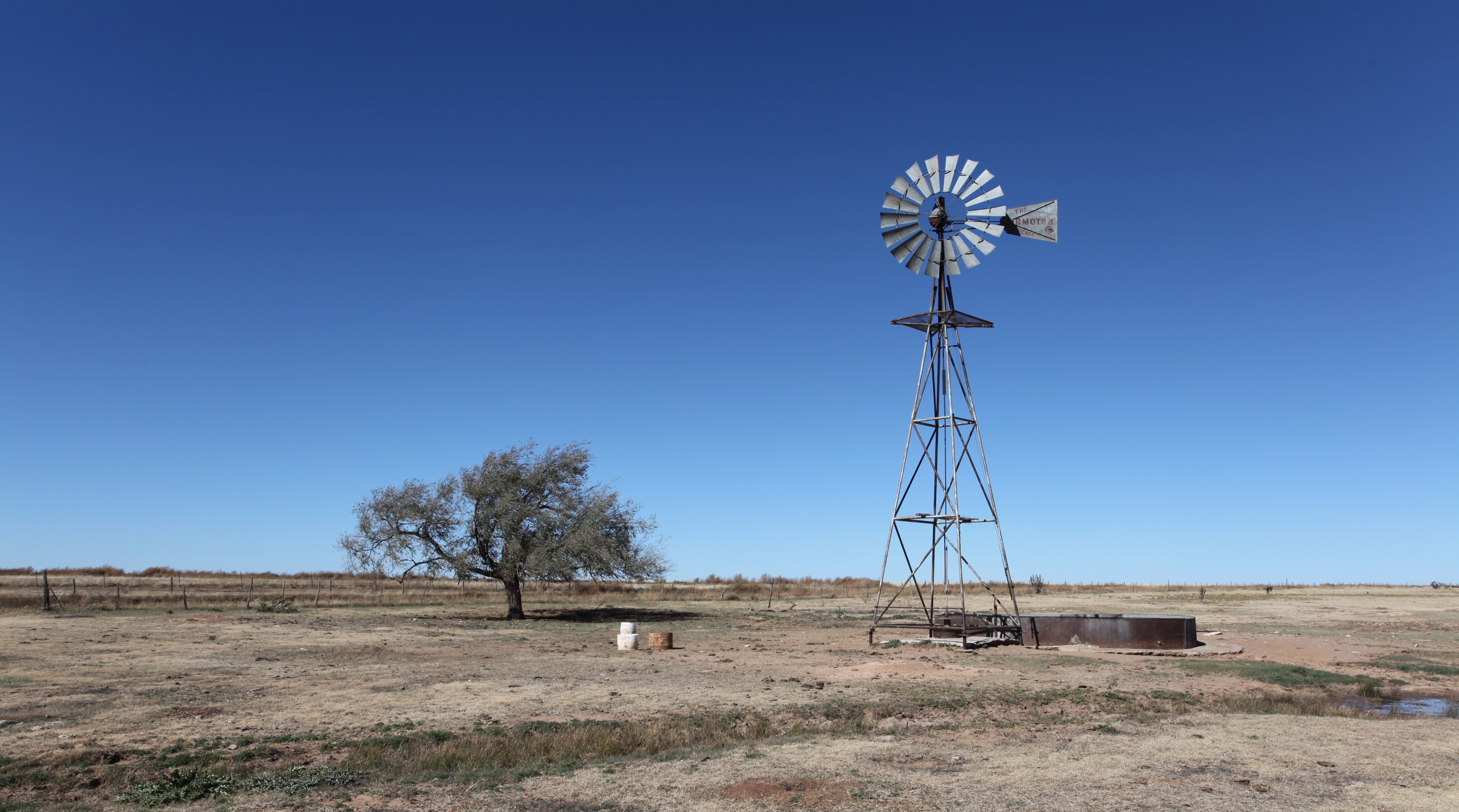
The High Plains in Eastern New Mexico, but also located in Eastern Colorado and West Texas

Landscape features of the core southwestern areas include mountains, canyons, mesas, buttes, high broad basins, plateaus, desert lands, and some plains, characteristic of the Basin and Range Province. The entire southwestern region features semi-arid to arid terrain. The far eastern part of southwestern Texas, for example, the Texas Hill Country, consists of dry, tall, and rugged rocky hills of limestone and granite. South Texas and the Rio Grande Valley is mostly flat with many places consisting of scrub and bare topsoil, much like the deserts further west.

== Wildlife ==
The region has an extremely diverse bird population, with hundreds of species being found in the American Southwest. In the Chiricahua Mountains alone, in southeastern Arizona, there can be found more than 400 species. Species include Canada (Branta canadensis) and snow geese, sandhill cranes (Grus canadensis), and the roadrunner, the state bird of New Mexico and most famous bird in the region, is found in all states of the Southwest. Birds of prey include the red-tailed hawk (Buteo jamaicensis), Cooper's hawk (Accipiter cooperii), the osprey (Pandion haliaetus), golden eagles (Aquila chrysaetos), Harris's hawk (Parabuteo unicinctus), American kestrel (Falco sparverius), peregrine falcon (Falco peregrinus), the gray hawk (Buteo plagiatus), the American barn owl (Tyto furcata), the western screech owl (Megascops kennicottii), the great horned owl (Bubo virginianus), the elf owl (Micrathene whitneyi), and the burrowing owl (Athene cunicularia)

Other bird species include the turkey vulture (Cathartes aura), the black vulture (Coragyps atratus), the northern cardinal (Cardinalis cardinalis), the blue grosbeak (Passerina caerulea), the house finch (Haemorhous mexicanus), the lesser goldfinch (Spinus psaltria), the broad-billed hummingbird (Cynanthus latirostris), the black-chinned hummingbird (Archilochus alexandri), Costa's hummingbird (Calypte costae), Gambel's quail (Callipepla gambelii), the common raven (Corvus corax), the Gila woodpecker (Melanerpes uropygialis), the gilded flicker (Colaptes chrysoides), the cactus wren (Campylorhynchus brunneicapillus), the rock wren (Salpinctes obsoletus), and the federally endangered Southwest willow flycatcher (Empidonax traillii extimus). Four types of doves call the Southwest home: the white-winged dove (Zenaida asiatica), the mourning dove (Zenaida macroura), the common ground dove (Columbina passerina), and the Inca dove (Columbina inca).

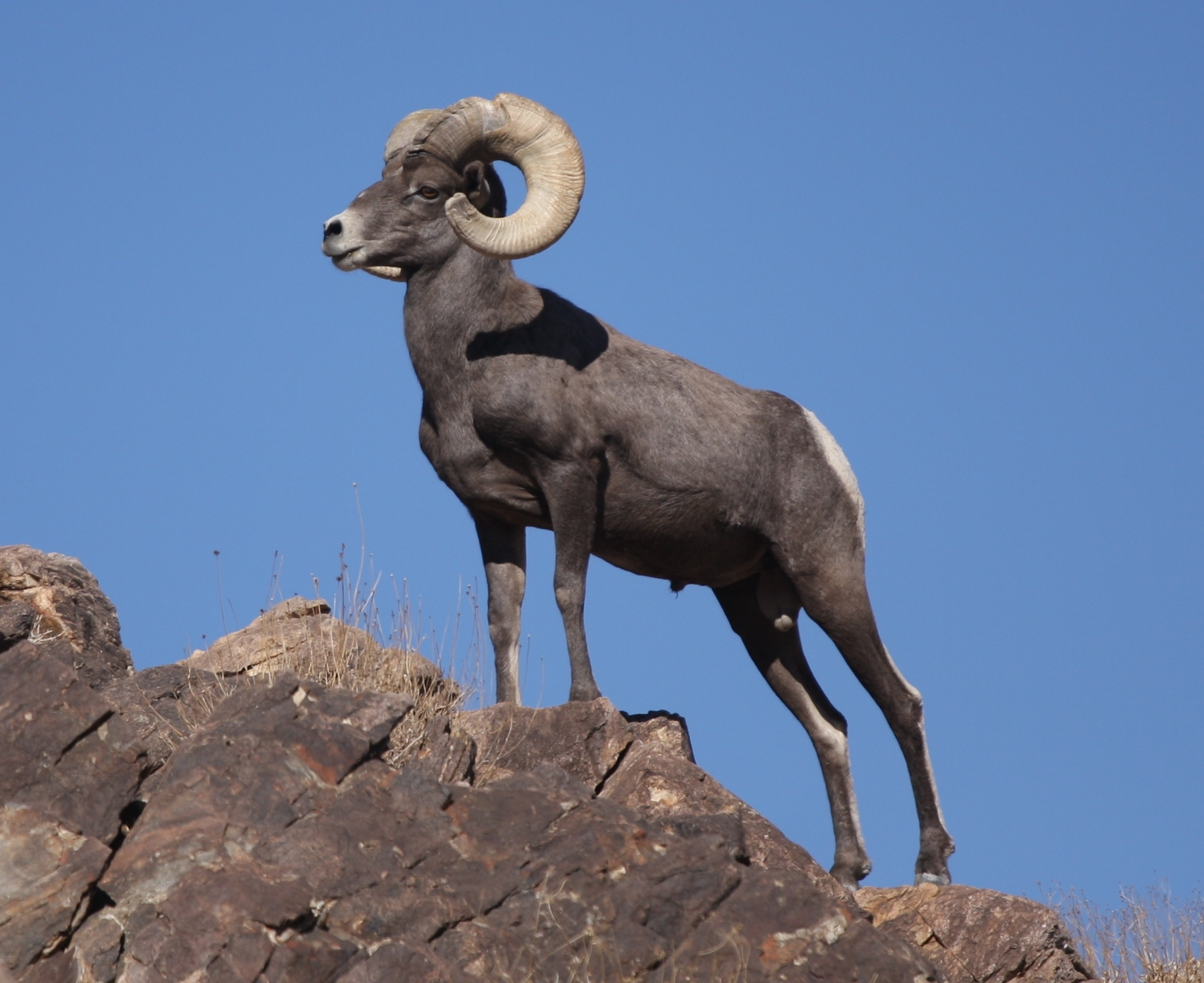
Desert bighorn sheep

Mammal species include the bison, bobcat, coyote, black bear, black-tailed jackrabbit, desert cottontail, desert bighorn sheep, mule deer, white-tailed deer, gray fox, mountain lion, river otter, long-tailed weasel, western spotted skunk, pronghorn, raccoon, cactus mouse, and Ord's kangaroo rat, all of which can be found in parts of every southwestern state. Elk are found in parts of Colorado, New Mexico, Utah, and Arizona. White-nosed coati and collared peccary—or javelina—in the Southwest are normally found in southern areas of Arizona, New Mexico, and Texas near the Mexican border. Jaguars can be found in the bootheel region of Southwestern New Mexico. The Mexican wolf (Canis lupus baileyi) was reintroduced to Arizona and New Mexico in 1998. A U.S. Fish and Wildlife Service study reported a minimum population of 241 Mexican wolves in southwest New Mexico and southeast Arizona at the beginning of 2023.

There is a large contingent of snakes native to the region. Among them include the rosy boa (Lichanura trivirgata); several sub-species of the glossy snake (Arizona elegans); the Trans-Pecos ratsnake (Bogertophis subocularis); several sub-species of shovel-nosed snakes; several sub-species of kingsnake, including the desert kingsnake (Lampropeltis getula splendida) and the Arizona mountain kingsnake (Lampropeltis pyromelana); the Arizona coral snake (Micruroides euryxanthus); the western diamondback rattlesnake (Crotalus atrox); the Trans-Pecos copperhead (Agkistrodon contortrix pictigaster); the Sonoran sidewinder (Crotalus cerastes cercobombus); the Arizona black rattlesnake (Crotalus oreganus cerberus); the western rattlesnake (Crotalus viridis); the Grand Canyon rattlesnake (Crotalus oreganus abyssus), found only in Arizona; several sub-species of the ridge-nosed rattlesnake (Crotalus willardi), the most recent rattlesnake species to be discovered in the United States, including the New Mexico ridge-nosed rattlesnake (Crotalus willardi obscurus), and the Arizona ridge-nosed rattlesnake, the state reptile of Arizona; and the desert massasauga (Sistrurus catenatus edwardsii).

Other reptiles in the region include lizards and turtles. Lizards are highly represented in the region, the most distinctive denizen being the Gila monster, native only to the American Southwest and the state of Sonora in Mexico. The New Mexico whiptail is the state reptile of New Mexico. Other lizards include: Sonoran collared lizard (Crotaphytus nebrius); several types of geckos, including western banded gecko (Coleonyx variegatus), the common house gecko (Hemidactylus frenatus), and the Mediterranean house gecko (Hemidactylus turcicus), the last two species being non-native to the region but have been introduced; the desert iguana (Dipsosaurus dorsalis); the chuckwalla (Sauromalus ater); the greater earless lizard (Cophosaurus texanus scitulus); several sub-species of horned lizards (Phrynosoma); numerous species of spiny lizards (Sceloporus); Gilbert's skink (Plestiodon gilberti); the western skink (Plestiodon skiltonianus); Trans-Pecos striped whiptail (Aspidoscelis inornata heptagrammus); and the Arizona night lizard (Xantusia arizonae). Turtles are less numerous than their other reptilian counterparts, but several are found in the region, including: the western painted turtle (Chrysemys picta bellii); the Rio Grande cooter (Pseudemys gorzugi); the desert box turtle (Terrapene ornata luteola); the Big Bend slider (Trachemys gaigeae gaigeae); the Sonora mud turtle (Kinosternon sonoriense); and the desert tortoise (Gopherus agassizii).

Amphibians include numerous toads and frogs in the American Southwest. Toads which can be found in the region include the Great Plains toad (Anaxyrus cognatus); the green toad (Anaxyrus debilis); the Arizona toad (Anaxyrus microscaphus); the New Mexico spadefoot (Spea multiplicata stagnalis); and the Colorado River toad (Incilius alvarius), also known as the Sonoran Desert toad. Frog representation includes: western barking frog (Craugastor augusti); the canyon tree frog (Hyla arenicolor); the Arizona treefrog (Hyla wrightorum); the western chorus frog (Pseudacris triseriata); Chiricahua leopard frog (Lithobates chiricahuensis); and the relict leopard frog (Lithobates onca). There are quite a few salamanders throughout the region, including: the Arizona tiger salamander (Ambystoma mavortium nebulosum) and the painted ensatina (Ensatina eschscholtzii picta).

Despite the Southwest being mostly arid, various fishes are found where water is available, including various species unique to the region. Apache trout and Gila trout are two salmonids endemic to the area, with the former found only in Arizona and the latter only in Arizona and New Mexico. Desert pupfishes are several closely related species of fish in the genus Cyprinodon, many of which are found in isolated spring-fed ponds hundreds of miles from each other, ranging from far West Texas to Death Valley in California. These pupfishes often thrive in water considerably higher in temperature and dissolved solids than most fish can tolerate. Many of these desert fish species are endangered due to their limited and tenuous habitat, as well as loss of habitat due to human consumption of groundwater and diversion of surface water, as well as the introduction of species such as sportfish for recreation (see: Rio Grande Silvery Minnow v. Bureau of Reclamation).

== Climate ==
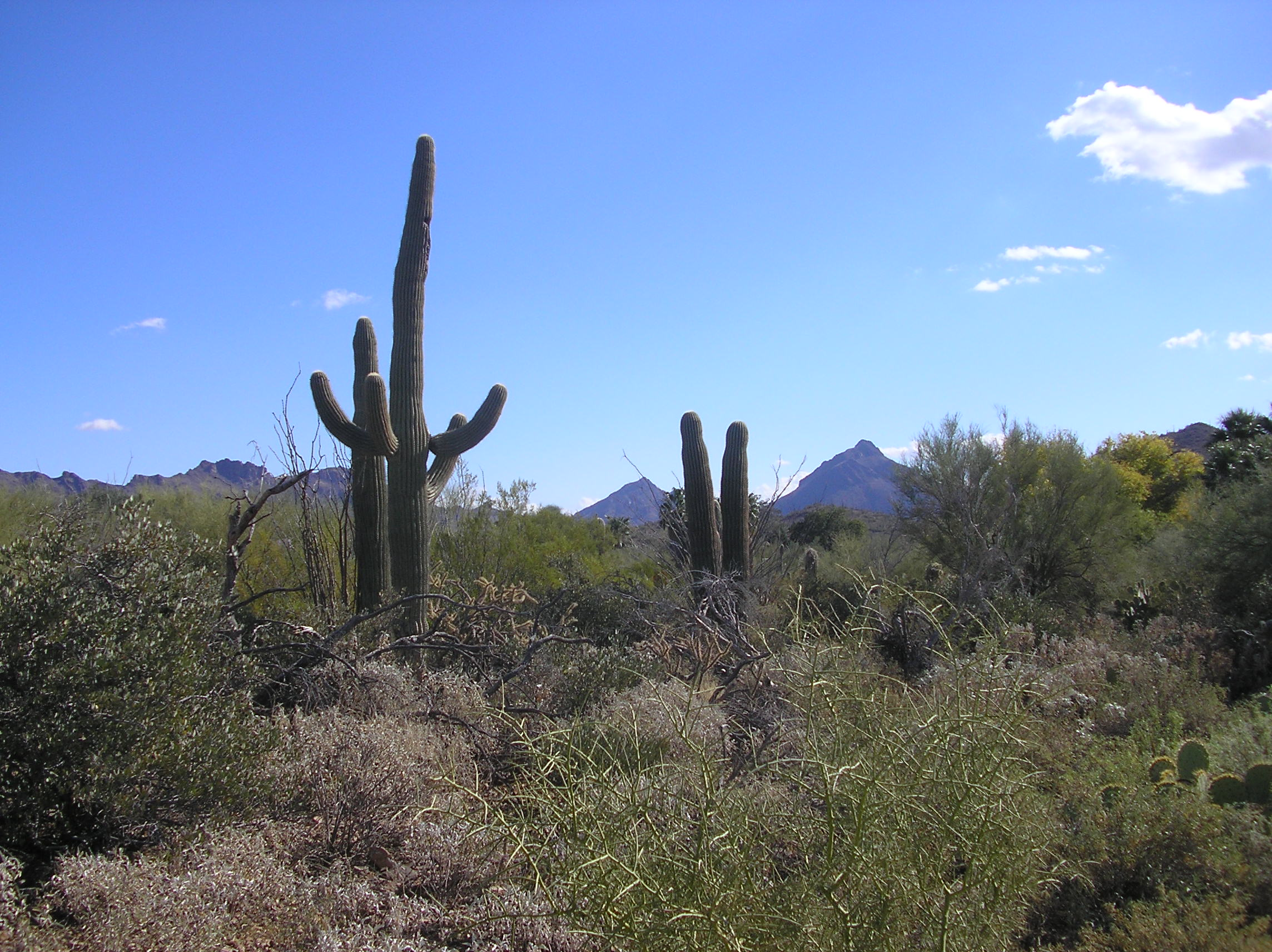
Sonoran Desert terrain near Tucson

The southwestern United States features a semi-arid to arid climate, depending on the location. Much of the Southwest is an arid desert climate, but higher elevations in the mountains in each state, with the exception of West Texas, feature alpine climates with very large amounts of snow. The metropolitan areas of Phoenix, Tucson, Las Vegas, and El Paso hardly ever receive any snow at all, as they are strictly desert lands with mountains. Albuquerque receives less snow than other cities, but still receives significant snowfalls occasionally in the winter. Although it snows in this region, the snow in this part of the United States melts rapidly, often before nightfall. This is due mainly to the higher altitude and abundant sunshine in these states.

Nevada and Arizona are both generally arid with desert lands and mountains, and receive large amounts of snow in the higher elevations in and near the mountains. New Mexico, Utah, and Colorado are generally arid, with desert lands and mountains as well. They all receive decent amounts of snow and large amounts of snow in the high elevations in the mountains, although some areas in far southwestern and southern New Mexico do not receive much snow at all at lower elevations. West Texas is generally arid as well but does not receive the same amount of snow that the other southwestern states receive at their high elevations. The terrain of western Texas in the Southwest is the flat, rolling land of the plains, which eventually turns into a desert with some hills. There are significant mountains as well in west Texas upon reaching the Trans-Pecos area.

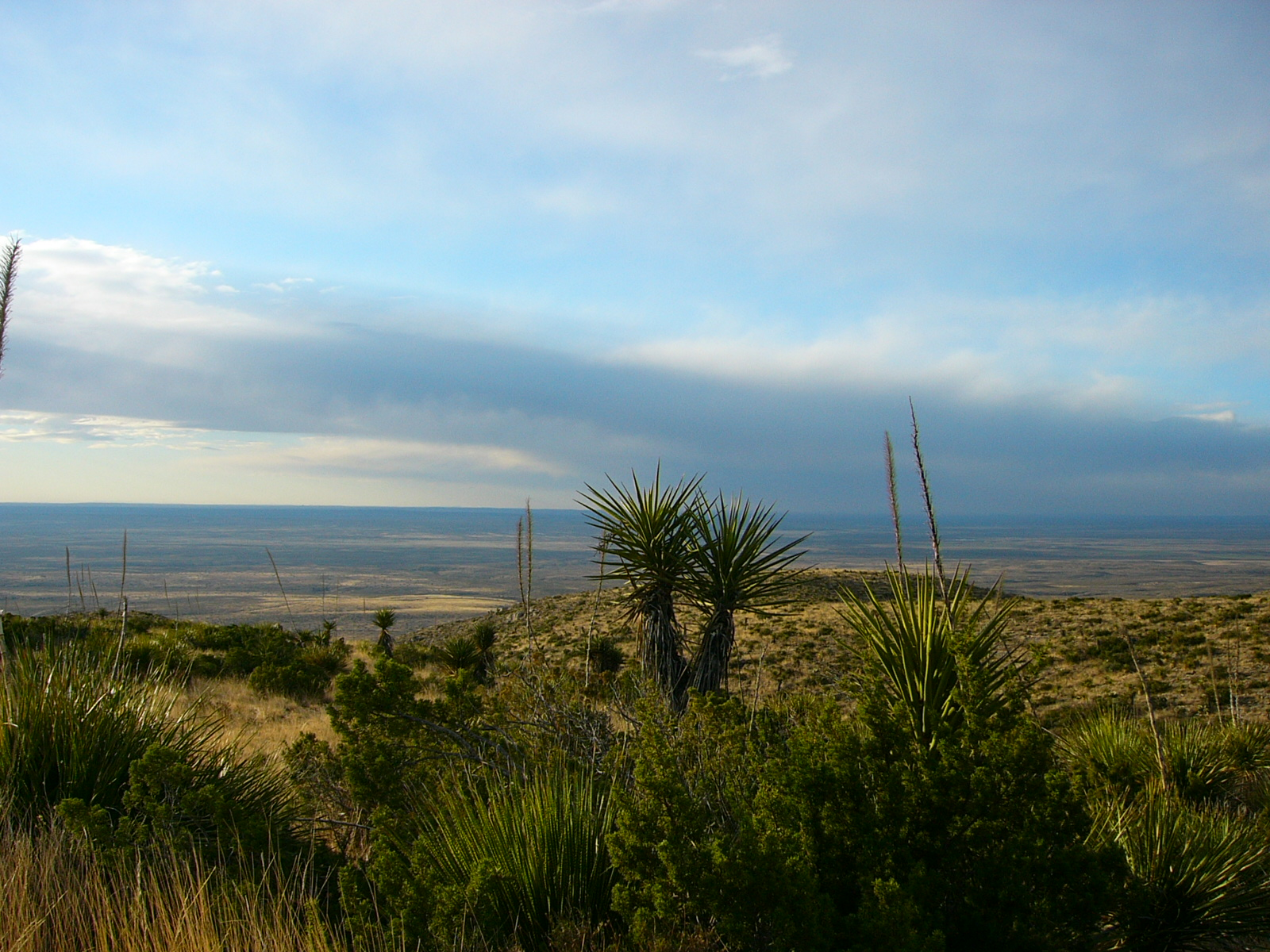
Chihuahuan Desert terrain near Carlsbad

The term "High Desert" is synonymous with this region. The High Desert is generally defined as the Mojave Desert and the Colorado Plateau, which extends from inland southern California into southern Nevada, east to the Rio Grande Rift in New Mexico. The High Desert also extends into parts of the Northwest, such as the Red Desert in southwestern Wyoming. The High Desert is very different from the lower desert lands found in Arizona, in the Sonoran Desert. This area of the desert land generally sits at a very high elevation, much higher than the normal desert land, and can receive very cold temperatures at night in the winter (with the exception of California, southern Nevada and southwestern Utah), sometimes near zero degrees on very cold nights. The High Desert also receives a decent amount of snowfall in the winter (with the exception of California, southern Nevada and southwestern Utah) which melts very quickly. Rain falls in this region mainly in the summer, during the North American Monsoon season.

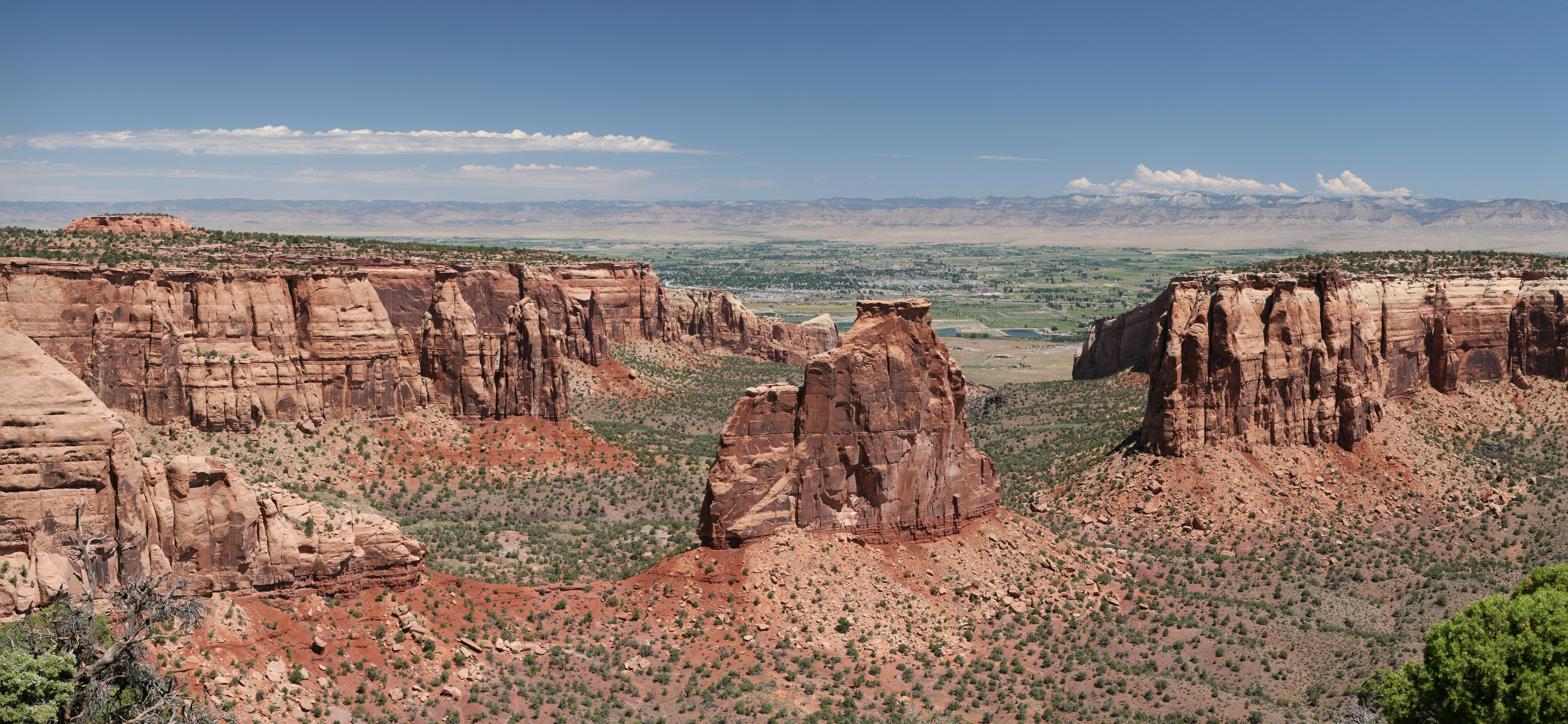
Monument Canyon, some of the high desert lands found in Colorado

The desert lands found in Eastern Utah, Northern Arizona, Colorado and New Mexico are usually referred to as the high desert. Colorado has scattered desert lands found in southern, southwestern, western, and northwestern parts of the state. These scattered desert lands are located in and around areas such as, the Roan Plateau, Dinosaur National Monument, Colorado National Monument, Royal Gorge, Cortez, Dove Creek, Canyons of the Ancients National Monument, Four Corners Monument, Montrose, Blue Mesa Reservoir, Pueblo, San Luis Valley, Great Sand Dunes and Joshua Tree National Park. Besides the Chihuahuan Desert, lands in southwestern and southern New Mexico, they also have scattered desert lands in the northwestern and northern portions of their state, which is referred to as the high desert.

During El Niño, winters and springs are generally colder and wetter across southern portions of the region, while the northern portion stays warmer and drier due to a southern jet stream. Under La Niña, the opposite happens, meaning the cool and wet weather tends to stay farther north. The Southwest also experiences multi-year and multi-decade episodes of severe drought, including the ongoing southwestern North American megadrought which emerged starting year 2000.

== National parks, monuments and forests ==
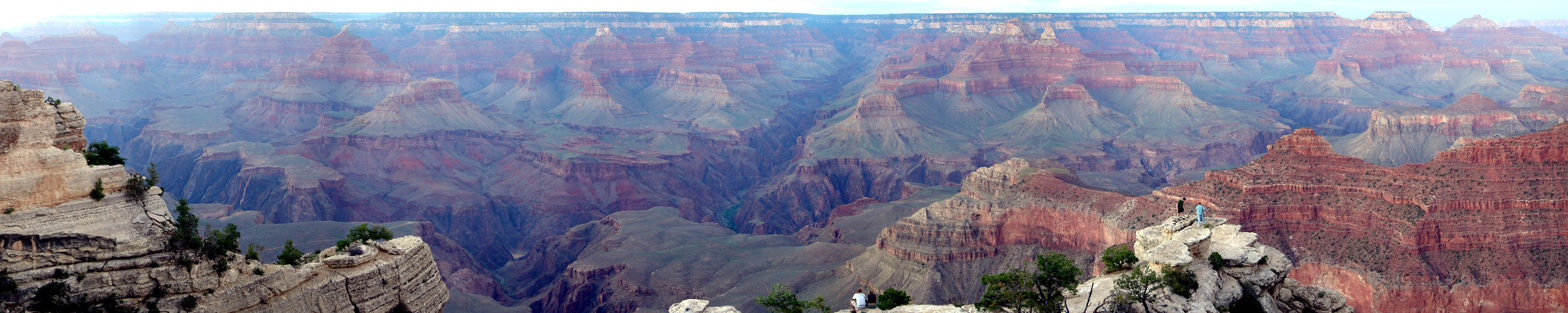
Grand Canyon from the South Rim

The southwestern United States contains many well-known national parks including Grand Canyon in Arizona, Death Valley in California, Great Sand Dunes in Colorado, Arches in Utah, Big Bend in Texas, Great Basin in Nevada, and White Sands in New Mexico.

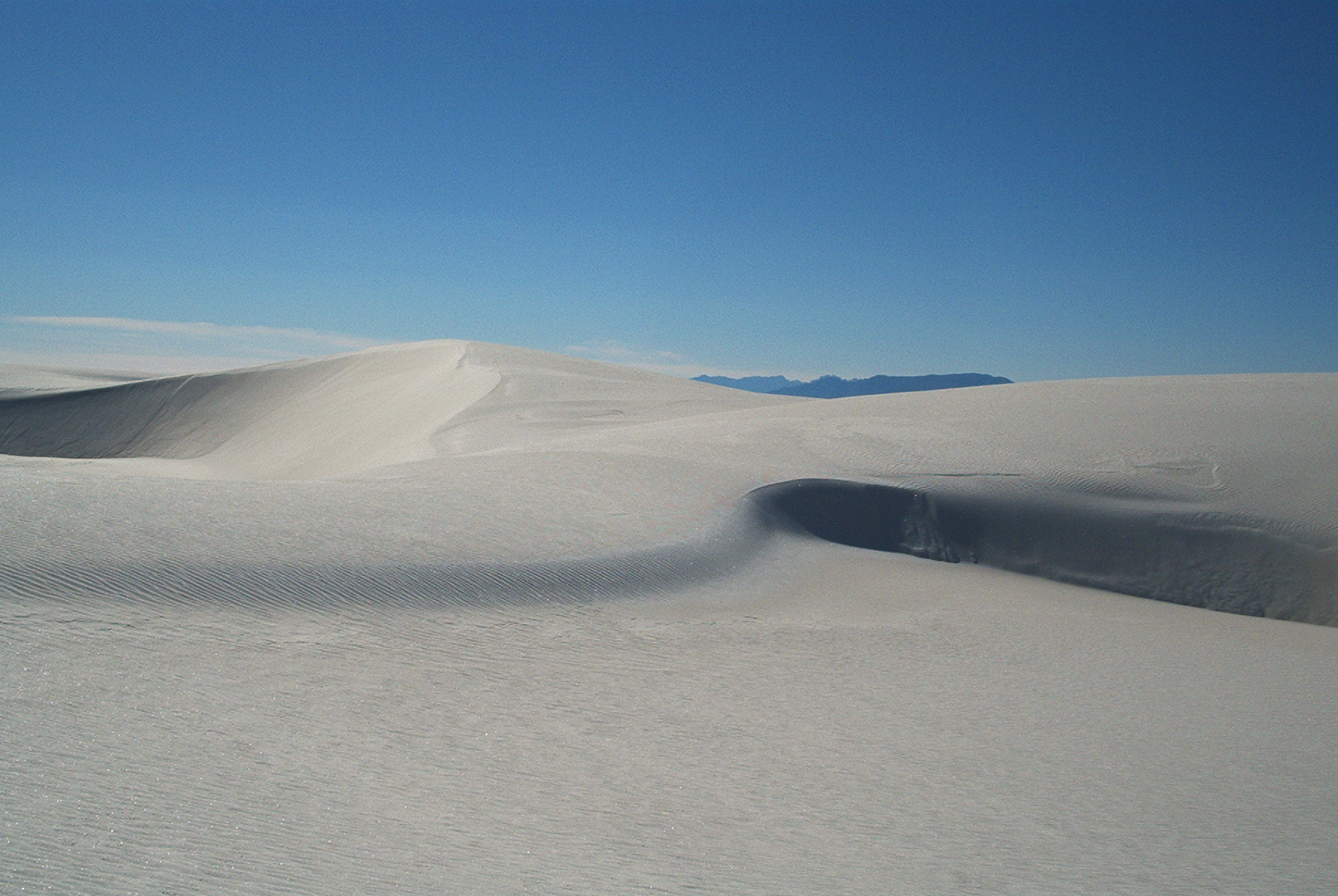
White Sands National Park, New Mexico

Arizona parks and monuments include Grand Canyon, Monument Valley (a Navajo Nation park), Petrified Forest, and Saguaro national parks; the national monuments of Agua Fria, Canyon de Chelly, Casa Grande Ruins, Chiricahua, Ironwood Forest, Montezuma Castle, Navajo, Organ Pipe Cactus, Pipe Spring, Sonoran Desert, Sunset Crater, Tonto, Tuzigoot, Vermilion Cliffs, Walnut Canyon, and Wupatki. Other federal areas include the Apache–Sitgreaves National Forests and Tumacacori National Historical Park.

Southern California parks and monuments include Death Valley and Joshua Tree national parks; the national monuments of Castle Mountains, Mojave Trails, Sand to Snow, and San Gabriel Mountains; and Mojave National Preserve.

Colorado parks and monuments include Great Sand Dunes, Black Canyon of the Gunnison, and Mesa Verde national parks; the national monuments of Browns Canyon, Canyons of the Ancients, Colorado, Hovenweep, and Yucca House. Other federal areas include Curecanti National Recreation Area and Bent's Old Fort National Historic Site; as well as the national forests of San Isabel, San Juan, and Uncompahgre.

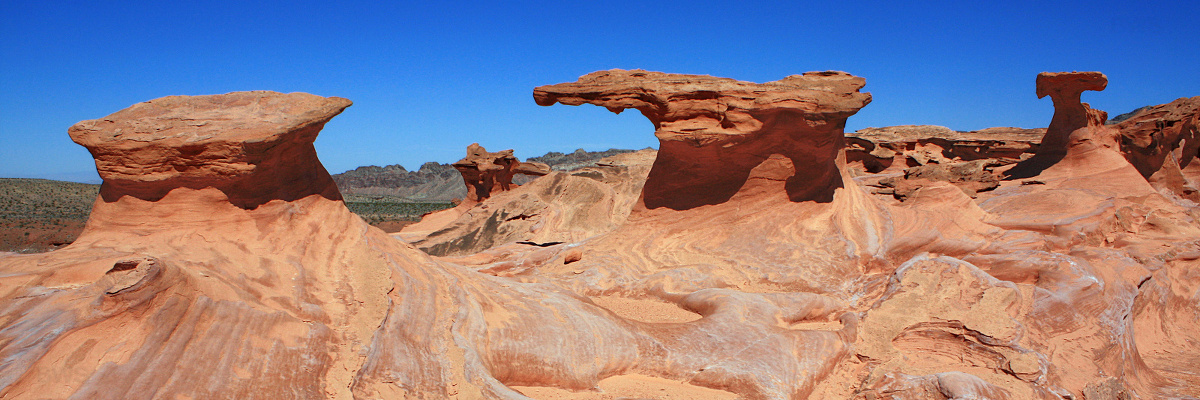
Little Finland in Gold Butte National Monument, Nevada

Nevada has one national park at Great Basin, and the national monuments of Basin and Range, Gold Butte, and Tule Springs Fossil Beds. Other federal areas include Humboldt-Toiyabe National Forest, Lake Mead National Recreation Area, and Red Rock Canyon National Conservation Area.

New Mexico has two national parks, at Carlsbad Caverns and White Sands. National monuments include Aztec Ruins, Bandelier, El Malpais, El Morro, Gila Cliff Dwellings, Kasha-Katuwe Tent Rocks, Organ Mountains–Desert Peaks, Petroglyph, Rio Grande del Norte, and Salinas Pueblo Missions. Other federal park areas include Chaco Culture National Historical Park, Pecos National Historical Park, Sevilleta National Wildlife Refuge, and the national forests of Apache, Carson, Gila, Lincoln, and Santa Fe.

West Texas has two national parks, at Big Bend and Guadalupe Mountains. Other federal park areas include Chamizal National Memorial and Fort Davis National Historic Site.

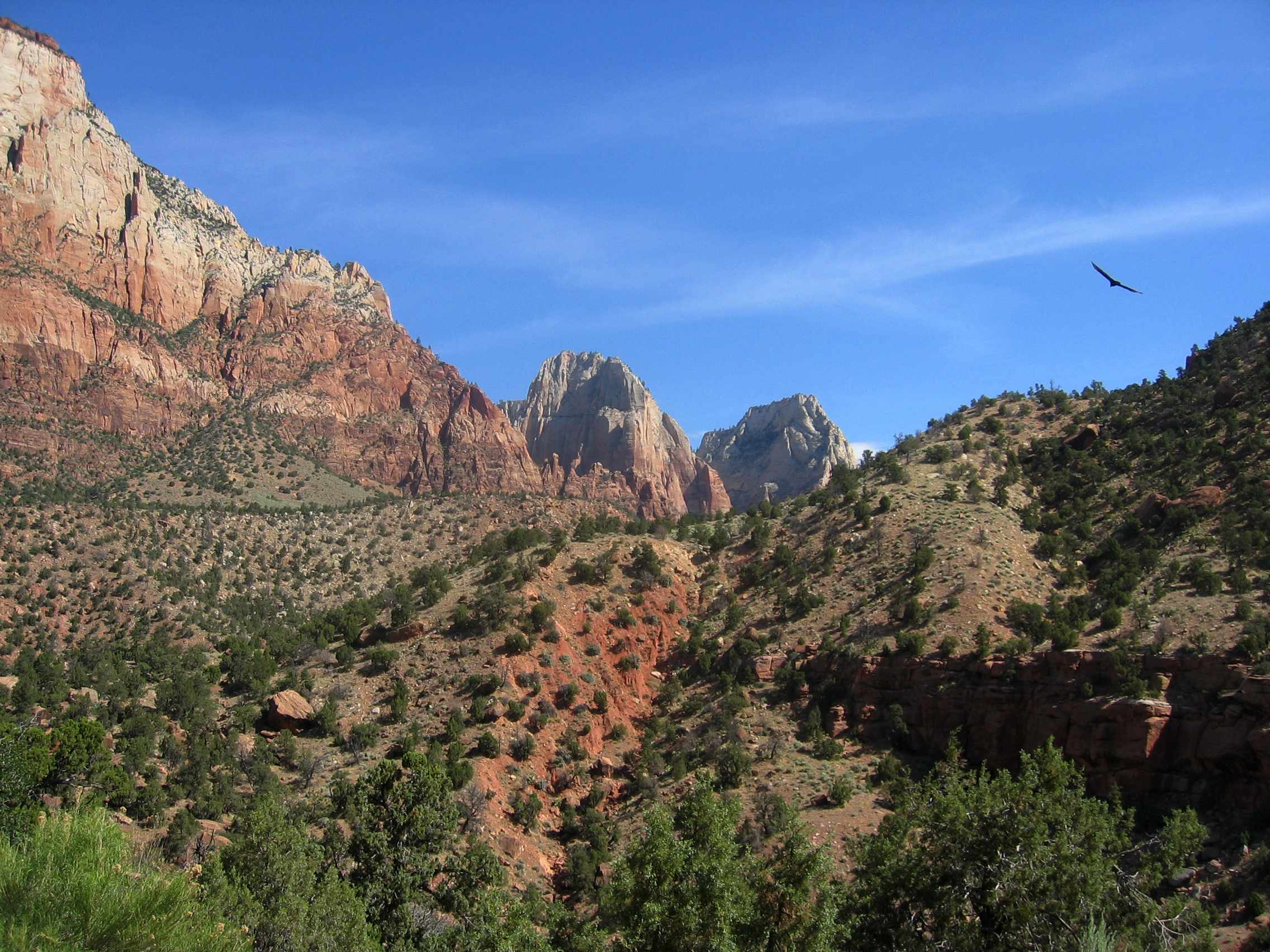
Mountains in Zion National Park, Utah

Utah national parks include Arches, Bryce Canyon, Canyonlands, Capitol Reef, and Zion. National monuments include Bears Ears, Cedar Breaks, Grand Staircase–Escalante, Hovenweep (also in Colorado), Natural Bridges, and Rainbow Bridge. Other federal areas include Glen Canyon National Recreation Area, Dixie National Forest, and Manti–La Sal National Forest.

== Demographics ==
Hispanic Americans can be found in large numbers in every major city in the Southwest such as El Paso (80%), San Antonio (63%), Los Angeles (48%), Albuquerque (47%), Phoenix (43%), Tucson (41%), Las Vegas (32%), and Mesa (27%). Over 60 percent of the Latino population in the Southwest is Mexican American.

Very large Hispanic American populations can also be found in the smaller cities such as Eagle Pass (96%), Las Cruces (56%), Yuma (55%), Blythe (53%), Pueblo (48%), Santa Fe (48%), and Glendale (36%). Many small towns throughout the southwestern states also have significantly large Latino populations.

The largest Asian American populations in the southwest can be found in California and Texas, with some significant Asian population in Phoenix. The most significant American Indian populations can be found in New Mexico and Arizona.

More than 20% of Native Americans live in the Southwest.

Before 1700, the only permanent Spanish settlements in the Southwest were along the valley of the upper Rio Grande in New Mexico.

== Cities and urban areas ==
The area also contains many of the nation's largest cities and metropolitan areas, despite relatively low population density in rural areas. Phoenix is the fifth most populous city in the country, and Albuquerque and Las Vegas were some of the fastest-growing cities in the United States. Also, the region as a whole has witnessed some of the highest population growth in the United States, and according to the US Census Bureau, in 2008–2009, Utah was the fastest-growing state in America. As of the 2010 Census, Nevada was the fastest-growing state in the United States, with an increase of 35.1% in the last ten years. Additionally, Arizona (24.6%), Utah (23.8%), Texas (20.6%), and Colorado (16.9%) were all in the top ten fastest-growing states as well.

The largest metropolitan areas are centered around Phoenix (with an estimated population of more than 5 million as of 2020), Las Vegas (more than 2.2 million), Tucson (more than 1 million), Albuquerque (more than 900,000), and El Paso (more than 840,000). Those five metropolitan areas have an estimated total population of more than 9.6 million as of 2017, with nearly 60 percent of them living in the two Arizona cities—Phoenix and Tucson.

The five largest cities of the American Southwest (2020 census)
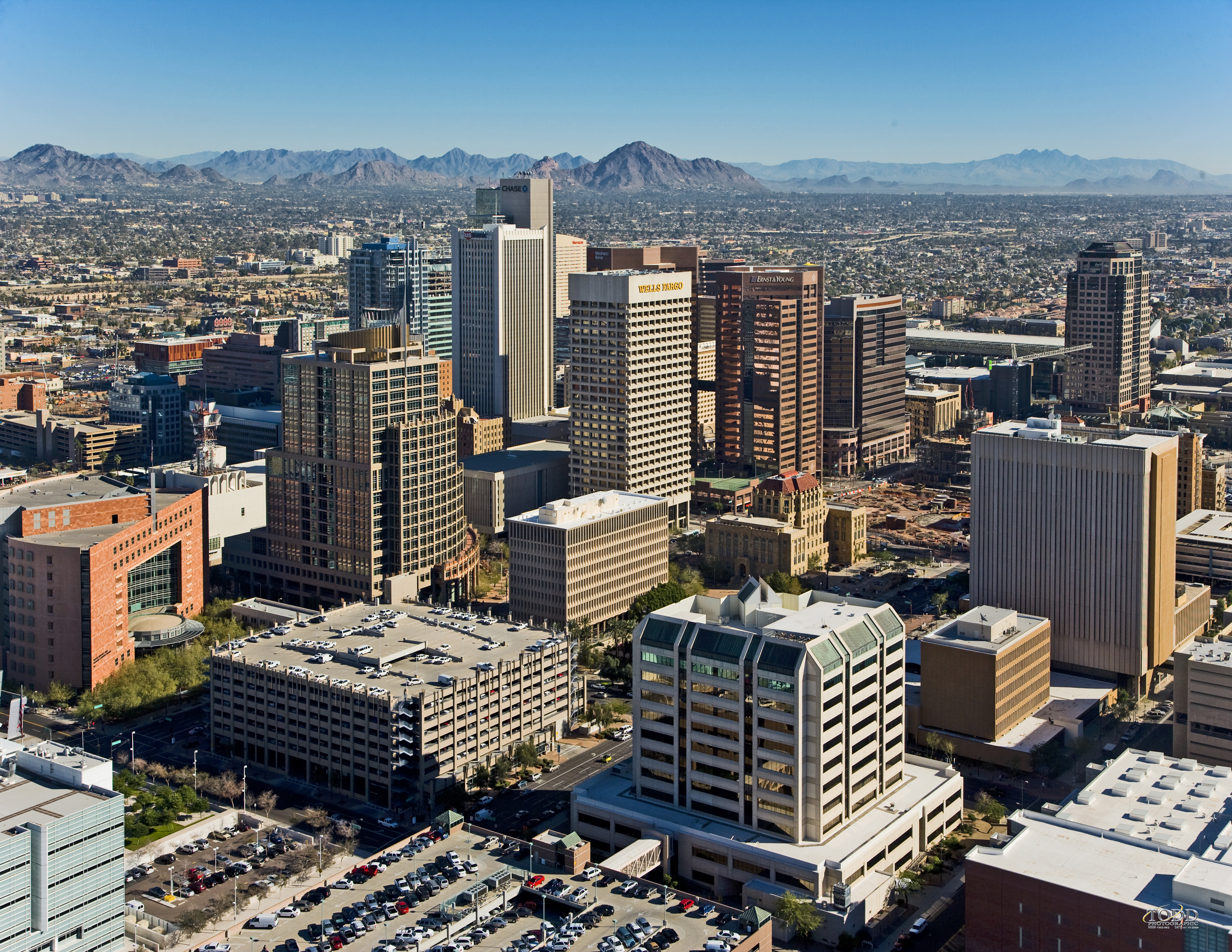
1. Phoenix (also the largest MSA)

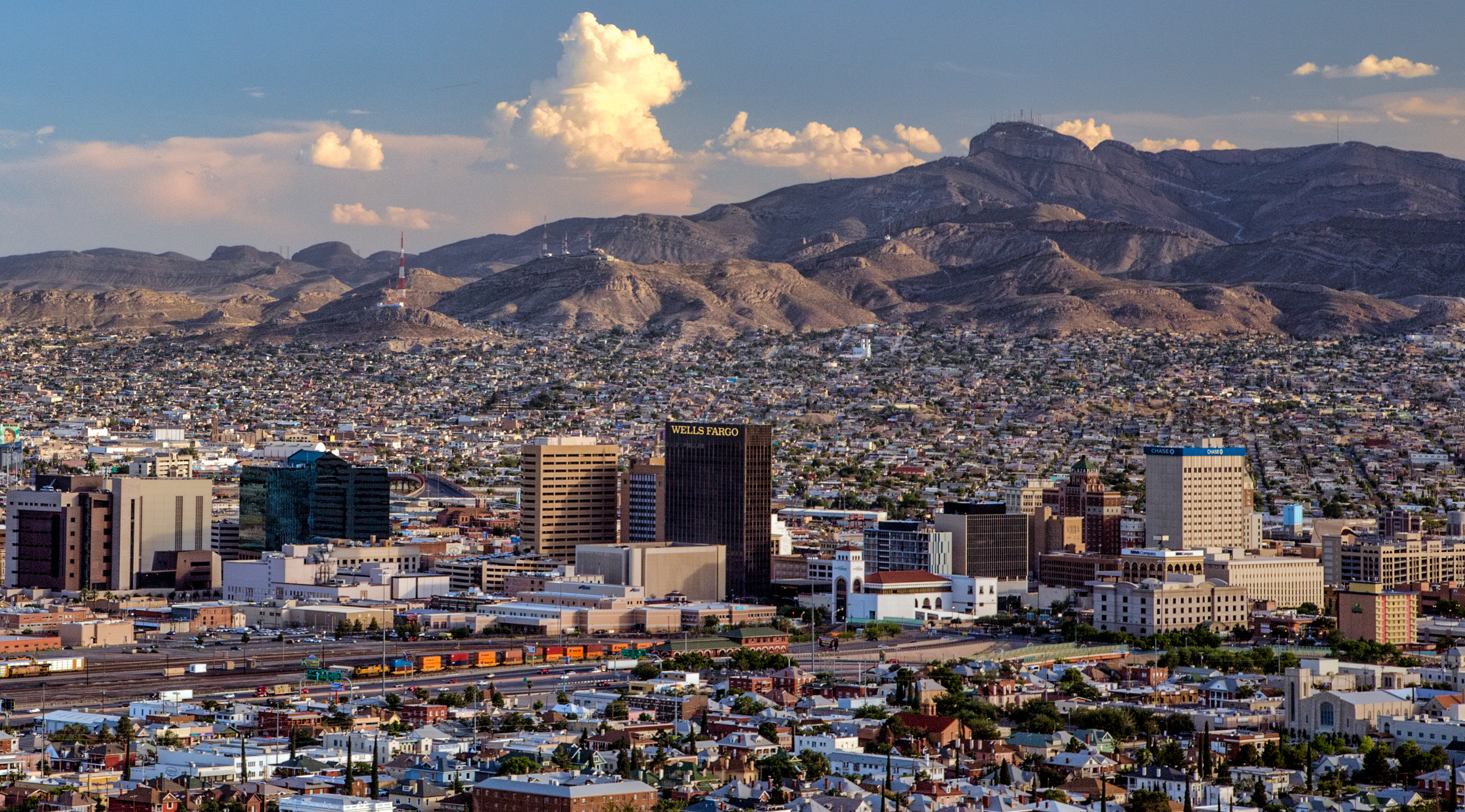
2. El Paso (5th largest MSA)

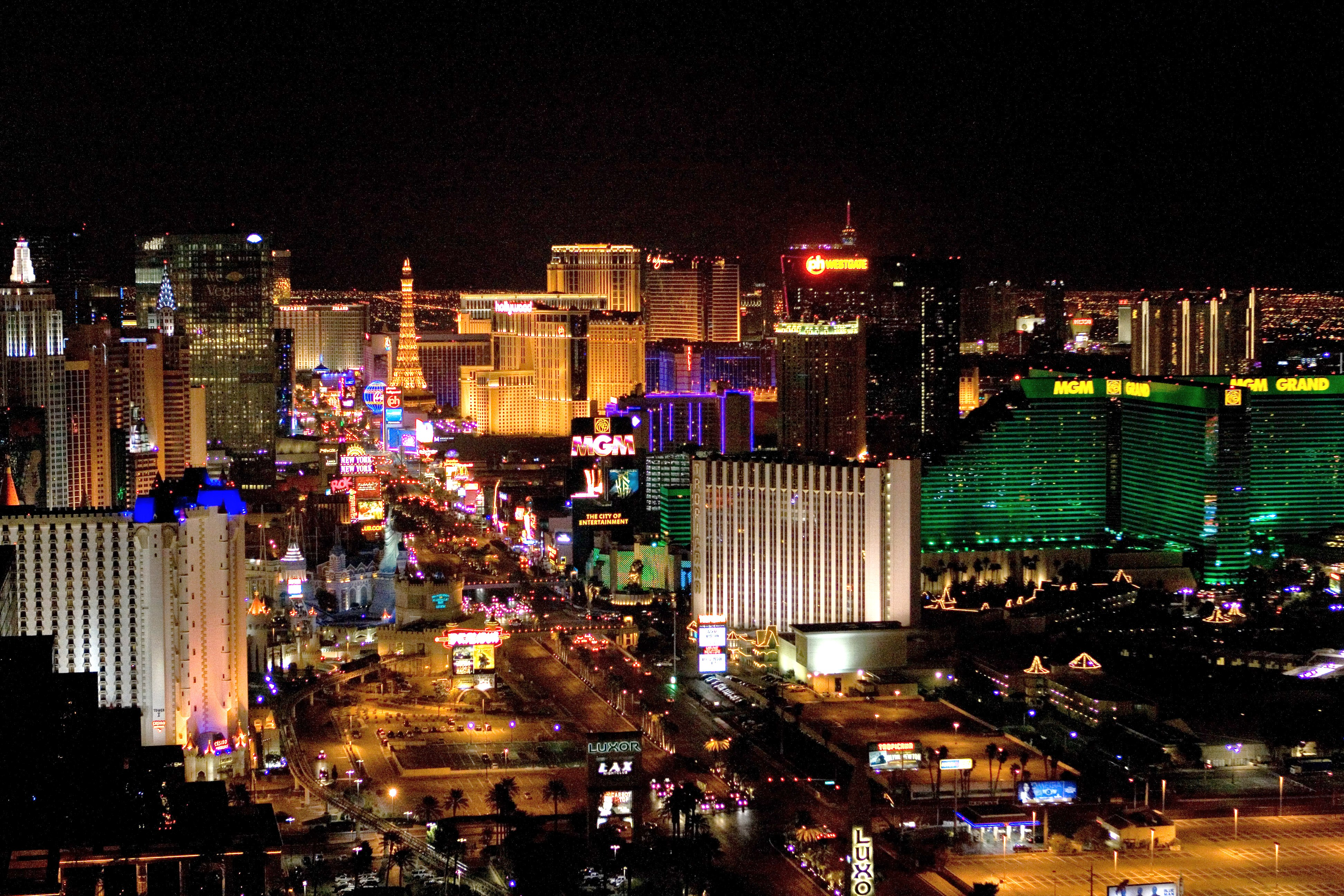
3. Las Vegas (2nd largest MSA)

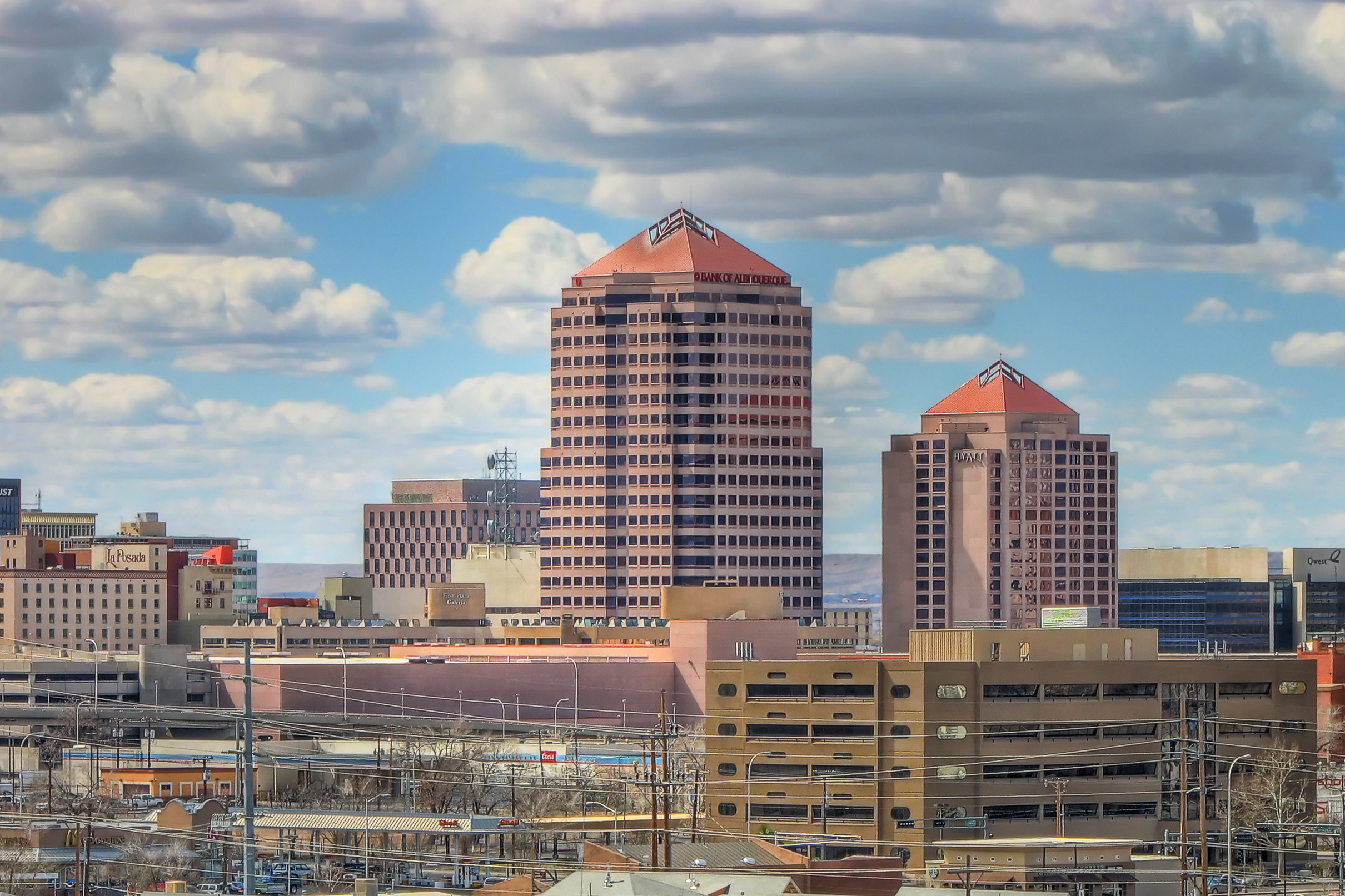
4. Albuquerque (also the 4th largest MSA)

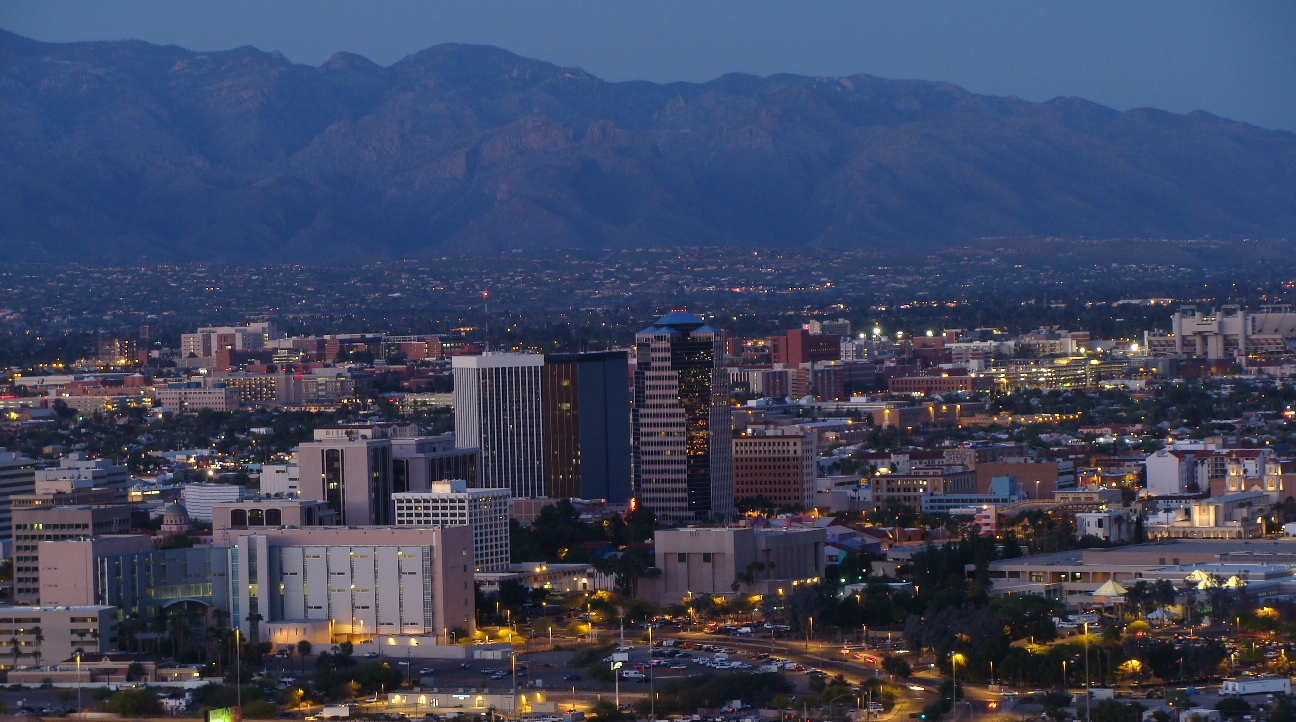
5. Tucson (3rd largest MSA)

=== Largest cities and metropolitan areas (2020 census) ===
Rank	City	State	Population	Metro Population
1	Phoenix	Arizona	1,608,139	4,845,832
2	El Paso	Texas	678,815	868,859
3	Las Vegas	Nevada	641,903	2,265,461
4	Albuquerque	New Mexico	564,559	916,528
5	Tucson	Arizona	542,629	1,043,433
6	Mesa	Arizona	504,258	4,845,832
7	Colorado Springs	Colorado	478,961	755,105
8	Henderson	Nevada	317,610	2,265,461
9	Chandler	Arizona	275,987	4,845,832
10	Gilbert	Arizona	267,918	4,845,832

== Sports ==
=== Professional ===
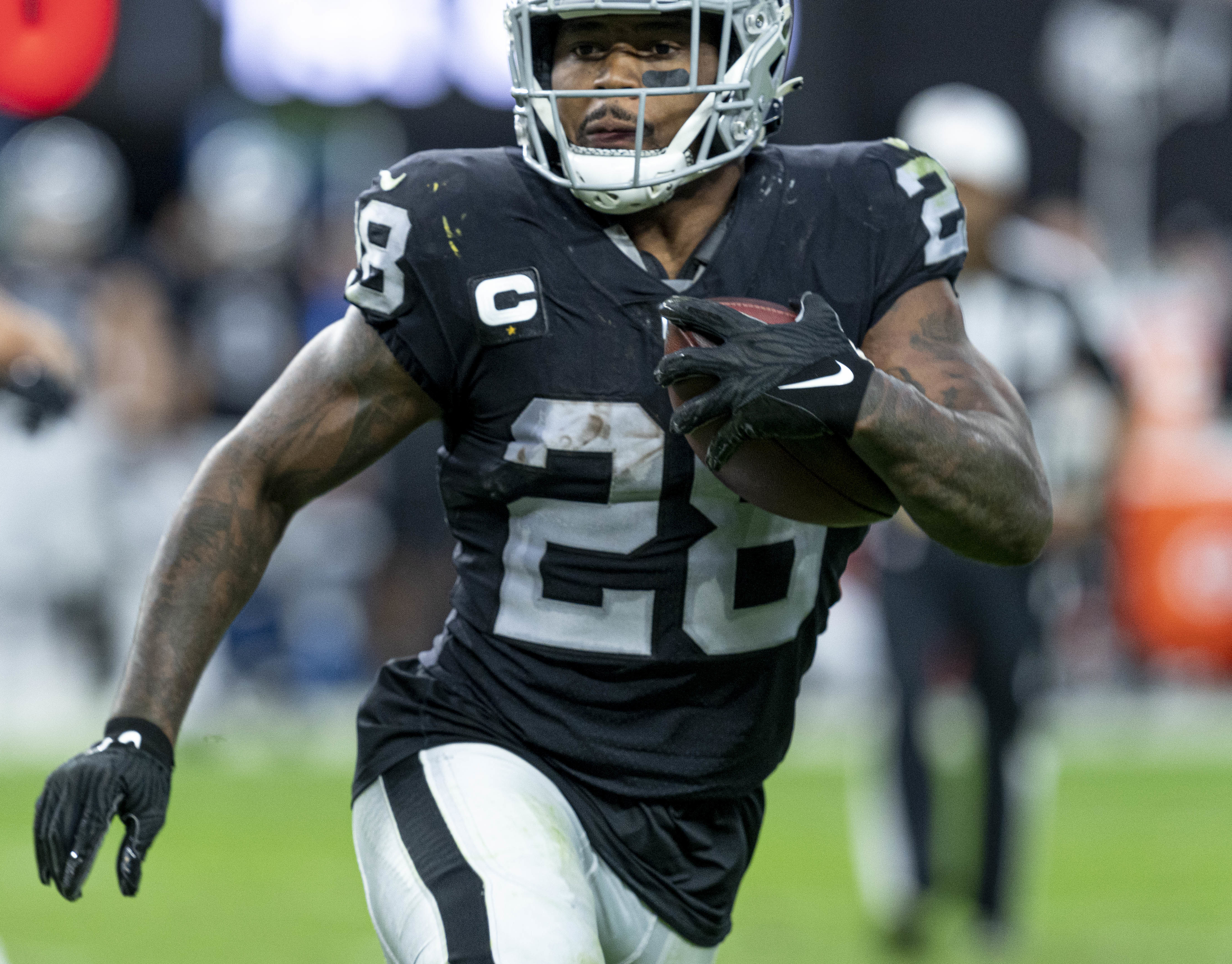
Runningback Josh Jacobs of the Las Vegas Raiders NFL team

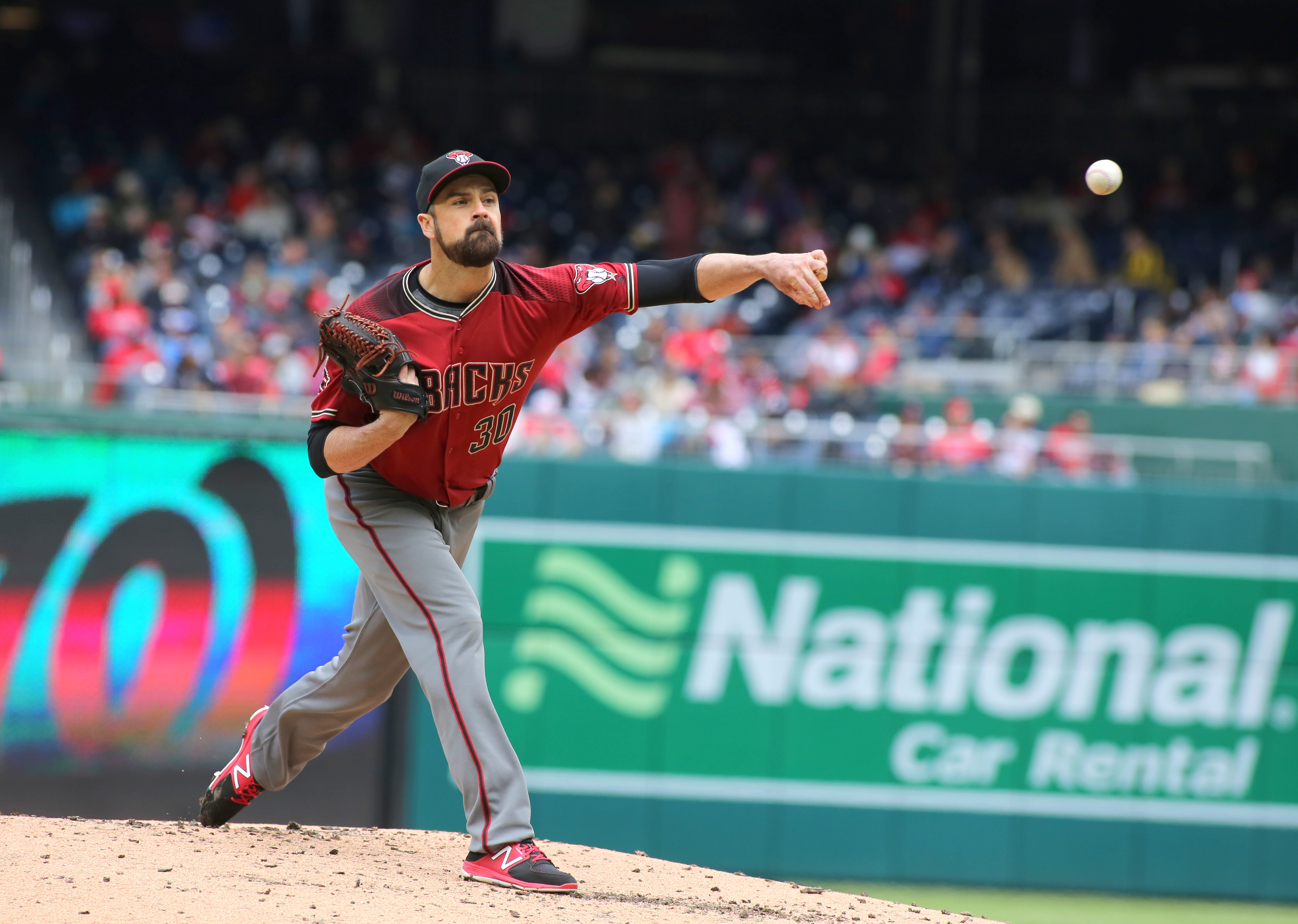
T. J. McFarland pitcher for the Arizona Diamondbacks professional baseball team.

Of the four major professional sports, Phoenix and Las Vegas are the only metropolitan areas in the Southwest that have representatives. Las Vegas is home to the Las Vegas Raiders NFL football team and the Vegas Golden Knights NHL hockey team. Phoenix is home to the Arizona Diamondbacks in Major League Baseball, Arizona Cardinals in the National Football League, and the Phoenix Suns in the National Basketball Association. The Greater Phoenix area is home to the Cactus League, one of two spring training leagues for Major League Baseball; fifteen of MLB's thirty teams are now included in the Cactus League. The region has also been the scene of several NFL super bowls. Sun Devil Stadium in Tempe held Super Bowl XXX in 1996, when the Dallas Cowboys defeated the Pittsburgh Steelers. State Farm Stadium in Glendale, Arizona hosted Super Bowl XLII on February 3, 2008, in which the New York Giants defeated the New England Patriots, as well as Super Bowl XLIX, which resulted in the New England Patriots defeating the Seattle Seahawks 28–24. The U.S. Airways Center hosted both the 1995 and the 2009 NBA All-Star Games.

In 1997, the Phoenix Mercury were one of the original eight teams to launch the Women's National Basketball Association (WNBA). Indoor American football is represented by the Arizona Rattlers located in Phoenix. The region is also host to several major professional golf events: the LPGA's Founder's Cup; the Phoenix Open and the Shriners Hospitals for Children Open (in Las Vegas) of the PGA; and the Tucson Conquistadores Classic (in Tucson), and the Charles Schwab Cup Championship (in Scottsdale) on the Champions Tour of the PGA.

NASCAR has two venues within the region: The Phoenix International Raceway, was built in 1964 with a one-mile oval, with a one-of-a-kind design, as well as a 2.5-mile road course, and the Las Vegas Motor Speedway, a 1,200-acre (490 ha) complex of multiple tracks for motorsports racing. There are several nationally recognized running events in the region, including The Phoenix Marathon, a qualifier for the Boston Marathon, and the Rock 'n' Roll Marathon Series in both Phoenix and Las Vegas. Las Vegas is also the end point for the annual Baker to Vegas Challenge Cup Relay, a 120-mile-long foot race by law enforcement teams from around the world, which is the largest law enforcement athletic event in the world.

The Professional Bull Riders association has its headquarters in Pueblo, Colorado. The PBR World Finals are held annually in Las Vegas, which also hosts the National Finals Rodeo.

Since the 1950s, Las Vegas has been host to many of professional boxing's largest events, beginning with the Heavyweight non-title bout in 1955 between world light heavyweight champion Archie Moore and perennial contender Niño Valdés. Muhammad Ali fought his last world title bout in Las Vegas against Larry Holmes in 1980, and Floyd Mayweather fought many of his major fights there.

=== College ===
The Southwest is home to a rich tradition of college sports. The Big-12 Conference has two teams in the region, the Arizona State Sun Devils and the University of Arizona Wildcats. The Mountain West Conference also has two teams, the UNLV Rebels and the University of New Mexico Lobos. Conference USA is represented by the University of Texas at El Paso Miners. The Big Sky Conference has two teams: the Lumberjacks of Northern Arizona University in Flagstaff, Arizona, and the Southern Utah University Thunderbirds in Cedar City, Utah. The Western Athletic Conference also has two representatives, the New Mexico State University Aggies in Las Cruces, New Mexico, and the Grand Canyon University Antelopes in Phoenix.

Las Vegas is becoming the nexus for NCAA league basketball tournaments. The Mountain West Conference, the Western Athletic Conference, the West Coast Conference, and the Pac-12 Conference all hold their conference basketball tournaments in Las Vegas.

The Southwest is the site of six college football bowl games: the Rate Bowl, formerly known as the Cheez-it Bowl, in Phoenix; the Arizona Bowl in Tucson; the Fiesta Bowl, played at the University of Phoenix Stadium; the Las Vegas Bowl; the New Mexico Bowl in Albuquerque; and the Sun Bowl in El Paso, Texas.

The erstwhile [20th century] Southwest Conference might seem to have been named after this region, but it had no teams from Arizona nor New Mexico. All but one of its teams were from schools in Texas.

== Politics ==
Presidential electoral votes in Southwestern states since 1952
Year	Arizona	California	Colorado	Nevada	New Mexico	Oklahoma	Texas	Utah
1952	Eisenhower	Eisenhower	Eisenhower	Eisenhower	Eisenhower	Eisenhower	Eisenhower	Eisenhower
1956	Εisenhower	Eisenhower	Eisenhower	Eisenhower	Eisenhower	Eisenhower	Eisenhower	Eisenhower
1960	Nixon	Nixon	Nixon	Kennedy	Kennedy	Nixon	Kennedy	Nixon
1964	Goldwater	Johnson	Johnson	Johnson	Johnson	Johnson	Johnson	Johnson
1968	Nixon	Nixon	Nixon	Nixon	Nixon	Nixon	Humphrey	Nixon
1972	Nixon	Nixon	Nixon	Nixon	Nixon	Nixon	Nixon	Nixon
1976	Ford	Ford	Ford	Ford	Ford	Ford	Carter	Ford
1980	Reagan	Reagan	Reagan	Reagan	Reagan	Reagan	Reagan	Reagan
1984	Reagan	Reagan	Reagan	Reagan	Reagan	Reagan	Reagan	Reagan
1988	Bush	Bush	Bush	Bush	Bush	Bush	Bush	Bush
1992	Bush	Clinton	Clinton	Clinton	Clinton	Bush	Bush	Bush
1996	Clinton	Clinton	Dole	Clinton	Clinton	Dole	Dole	Dole
2000	Bush	Gore	Bush	Bush	Gore	Bush	Bush	Bush
2004	Bush	Kerry	Bush	Bush	Bush	Bush	Bush	Bush
2008	McCain	Obama	Obama	Obama	Obama	McCain	McCain	McCain
2012	Romney	Obama	Obama	Obama	Obama	Romney	Romney	Romney
2016	Trump	Clinton	Clinton	Clinton	Clinton	Trump	Trump	Trump
2020	Biden	Biden	Biden	Biden	Biden	Trump	Trump	Trump
2024	Trump	Harris	Harris	Trump	Harris	Trump	Trump	Trump

== See also ==
- List of online encyclopedias of U.S. states
- Pacific Southwest
- Southwest Conference (for a different division of the US for sports)
- Water Education Foundation
- Western United States
- Cuisine of the Southwestern United States
