= Native American tribes in Texas =

Native American tribes in Texas are the Native American tribes who are currently based in Texas and the Indigenous peoples of the Americas who historically lived in Texas.

The history of early colonial Texas governments shows that Native Americans were often forced to give up political power through land loss, mission systems, and unequal treaties. These government policies pushed many tribes onto reservations or out of Texas completely.

Many individual Native Americans, whose tribes are headquartered in other states, reside in Texas. The Texas Historical Commission by law consulted with the three federally recognized tribes in Texas and as well as 26 other federally recognized tribes headquartered in surrounding states.

In 1986, the state formed the Texas Commission for Indian Affairs, later renamed the Texas Indian Commission, to manage trust lands and assist three federally recognized tribes headquartered in Texas. However, the commission was dissolved in 1989.

== Federally recognized tribes ==
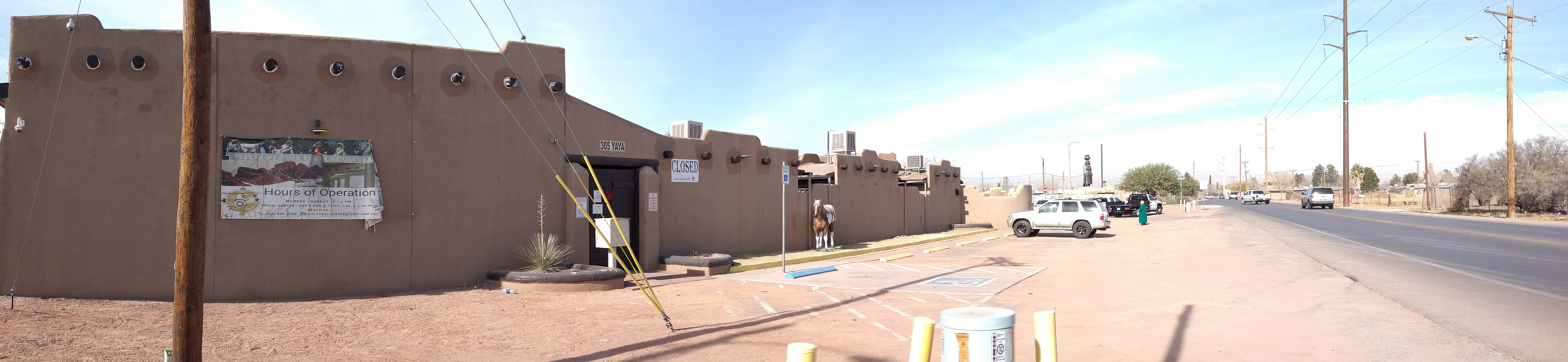
Ysleta del Sur Pueblo Cultural Center in El Paso, Texas

Texas has three federally recognized tribes. They are:

- Alabama–Coushatta Tribes of Texas, originally from Tennessee and Alabama
- Kickapoo Traditional Tribe of Texas, originally from the Great Lakes
- Ysleta Del Sur Pueblo of Texas originally from New Mexico.

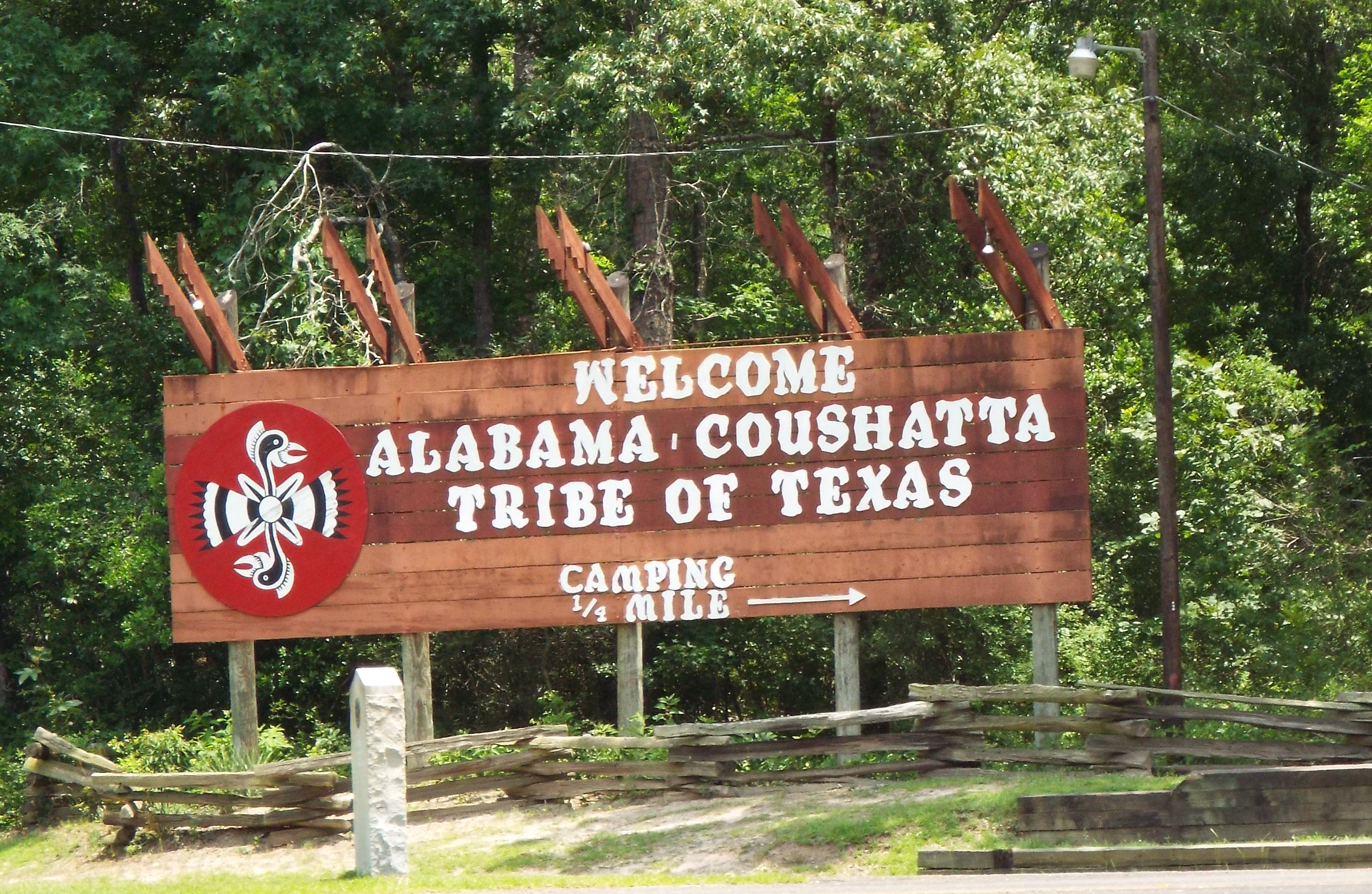
Alabama-Coushatta Tribes of Texas reservation

These three tribes have met the seven criteria of an American Indian tribe:

1. being an American Indian entity since at least 1900
2. a predominant part of the group forms a distinct community and has done so throughout history into the present
3. holding political influence over its members
4. having governing documents including membership criteria
5. members having ancestral descent from historic American Indian tribes
6. not being members of other existing federally recognized tribes
7. not being previously terminated by the U.S. Congress.

These three tribes are served by the Southern Plains Regional Office of the U.S. Department of the Interior's Bureau of Indian Affairs located in Anadarko, Oklahoma.

== American Indian reservations ==
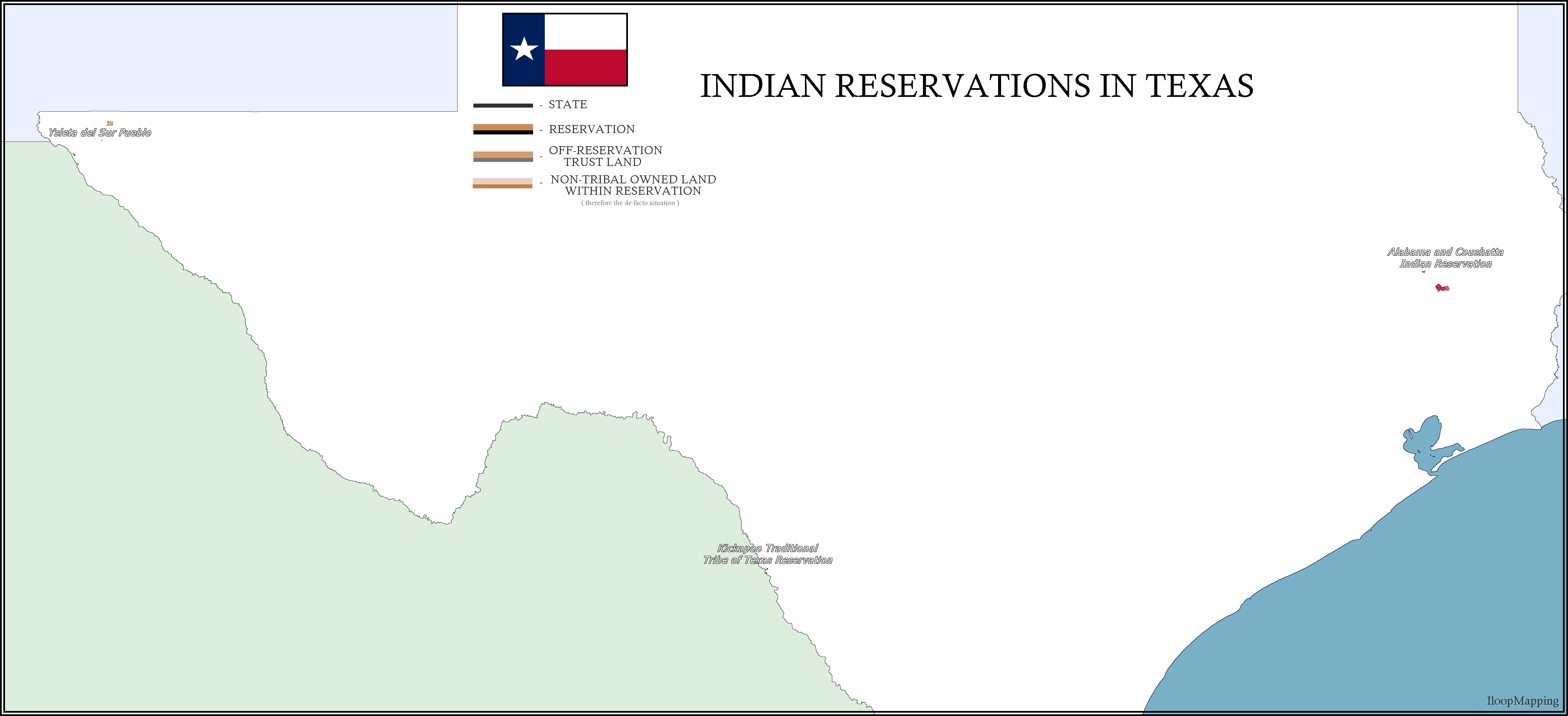
Map of the federally recognized Indian Reservations in Texas

These are three Indian Reservations in Texas:

- Alabama–Coushatta Reservation, in Polk County, Texas
- Kickapoo Reservation, in Maverick County, Texas
- Ysleta del Sur Pueblo, in El Paso County, Texas.

== State-recognized tribes ==
State-recognized tribes do not have the government-to-government relationship with the United States federal government that federally recognized tribes do. Texas has "no legal mechanism to recognize tribes," as journalists Graham Lee Brewer and Tristan Ahtone wrote. The Texas Commission for Indian Affairs, later Texas Indian Commission, only dealt with the three federally recognized tribes and did not work with any state-recognized tribes before being dissolved in 1989. Legal scholar J. Eric Reed (Choctaw Nation of Oklahoma) wrote in the November 2025 Texas Bar Journal, "Despite a rich history of [I]ndigenous peoples and tribes that still remain as communities of this state, Texas currently has no state-recognized tribes."

Several groups have claimed to be state-recognized based on congratulatory resolutions; however, "Resolutions are statements of opinions and, unlike bills, do not have the force of law." For example, the Lipan Apache Tribe of Texas were honored in Texas Senate Resolution 438 in 2009 and Texas State Concurrent Resolution 61 and Texas House Concurrent Resolution 171, both in 2019.

Texas Senate Bill 274 to formally recognize the Lipan Apache Tribe of Texas, introduced in January 2021, died in committee, as did Texas Senate Bill 231 introduced in November 2022. Texas Senate Bill 1479, introduced in March 2023, and Texas House Bill 2005, introduced in February 2023, both to state-recognize the Tap Pilam Coahuiltecan Nation also died in committee.

== Historical tribes of Texas ==
These are some of the tribes that have existed in what is now Texas. Many were forcibly removed to Indian Territory, now Oklahoma, in the 19th century, and few to New Mexico or Louisiana. Others no longer exist as tribes but may have living descendants.

In the late 20th century, U.S. federal policy toward Native Americans shifted toward protecting cultural and political rights. Beginning in 1975, Cultural Impact Assessments were implemented to evaluate how state might affect Native cultural resources and sites. Texas expanded these efforts in 2011 by Native American programs focused on economic development, healthcare, and education. The state also passed House Bill 3884, which requires government agencies to consider tribal perspectives when making decisions that affect Indigenous environment. These changes recognize tribal sovereignty and ensure that Native are included in government processes.

Locations of American Indian tribes in Texas, ca. 1500 CE

- Adai people, formerly eastern Texas
- Anxau, formerly southern Texas
- Apache people, formerly western Texas; now Arizona, New Mexico, and Oklahoma

- Lipan Apache, formerly southwest, now New Mexico
- Salinero, formerly west
- Teya, formerly Panhandle
- Vaquero, also Querecho, formerly northwestern Texas, possible ancestral Apache people

- Aranama, formerly southeast
- Atakapa, formerly Gulf Coast

- Akokisa, formerly Galveston Bay, Gulf Coast
- Bidai, formerly Trinity River, Gulf Coast
- Deadose, formerly southeast
- Patiri, formerly San Jacinto River

- Biloxi, formerly Neches River in the 19th century, now Louisiana
- Caddo, formerly eastern Texas, now Oklahoma

- Cacachau, formerly eastern, now Oklahoma
- Eyeish, formerly eastern, now Oklahoma
- Hainai, formerly eastern, now Oklahoma
- Kadohadacho, formerly northeast, now Oklahoma
- Nabedache, formerly eastern, now Oklahoma
- Nabiti, formerly eastern, now Oklahoma
- Nacogdoche, formerly eastern, now Oklahoma
- Nacono, formerly eastern, now Oklahoma
- Nadaco, formerly eastern, now Oklahoma
- Nanatsoho, formerly Red River, now Oklahoma
- Nasoni (Upper), formerly Red River, now Oklahoma
- Natchitoches, formerly Red River, now Oklahoma
- Nechaui, formerly eastern, now Oklahoma
- Neche, formerly eastern, now Oklahoma

- Comanche, formerly north and west, now Oklahoma
- Coahuiltecan, formerly southern

- Comecrudo, formerly southern
- Ervipiame, formerly south and central Texas
- Geier, formerly south-central
- Ocana, formerly Rio Grande
- Pajalat, formerly central
- Pastia, formerly south-central
- Payaya, formerly south-central
- Quepano, formerly south-central
- Unpuncliegut, formerly south coast
- Xarame, formerly south-central

- Dotchetonne, formerly northeastern
- Escanjaque Indians, formerly north-central
- Jumano, formerly southwestern
- La Junta, formerly west
  Otomoaco, formerly southwest
- Karankawa, formerly south coast
- Kiowa, formerly Panhandle, now Oklahoma
- Manso, formerly west
- Quems, formerly southwest
- Quicuchabe, formerly west
- Quide, formerly west
- Suma, formerly west, joined Apaches
- Teyas, formerly Panhandle
- Tonkawa, formerly southeast, now Oklahoma

- Mayeye, formerly south
- Yojuane, formerly east-central

- Wichita, formerly north-central, now Oklahoma

- Kichai, formerly north, now Oklahoma
- Taovaya, formerly north in the 19th century, now Oklahoma
- Tawakoni, formerly north and east in the 19th century, now Oklahoma
- Waco, formerly north, now Oklahoma
- Xanna, formerly east

=== Caddo ===
The Caddo lived in East Texas where they often did not move their village once established in that area. They were known for being a friendly tribe that came into alliances with French settlers. The Caddo planted agricultural crops such as corn. They were also skilled potters and had good trade networks. Today they are based in Oklahoma.

=== Comanche ===
The Comanche were located in the Southern Plains of Texas. They were protective of their territory and people; however, this led to conflict with other groups. They gathered horses from Europeans and began to breed them and use them during a battle. The Comanche relied on hunting buffalo which provided food, clothing, and shelter. Today they are based in Oklahoma.

=== Karankawa ===
The Karankawa lived along the Texas Gulf Coast. The advantage of being located near the water allowed them to gather seafood when crops were unable to grow. They were known for crafting baskets and helping Spanish explorers settle.

=== Jumano ===
Jumano lived in West and Central Texas. They were recognizable for the markings on their bodies and good trades. Over time, a group called Apaches had overthrown their tribe and environmental changes later led to their decline.

=== Contemporary tribes headquartered outside of Texas ===
Descendants of the tribes with historical ties to Texas that are now headquartered in surrounding states are:

- Absentee Shawnee Tribe of Oklahoma
- Alabama-Quassarte Tribal Town, Oklahoma
- Apache Tribe of Oklahoma
- Caddo Nation, Oklahoma
- Cherokee Nation, Oklahoma
- Cheyenne & Arapaho Tribes, Oklahoma
- Choctaw Nation of Oklahoma
- Comanche Nation, Oklahoma
- Coushatta Tribe of Louisiana
- Delaware Nation, Oklahoma
- Jena Band of Choctaw Indians, Louisiana
- Jicarilla Apache Nation, New Mexico
- Kialegee Tribal Town, Oklahoma
- Kickapoo Tribe of Oklahoma
- Mescalero Apache Tribe, New Mexico
- Muscogee (Creek) Nation, Oklahoma
- Osage Nation, Oklahoma
- Quapaw Nation, Oklahoma
- Seminole Nation of Oklahoma
- Shawnee Tribe, Oklahoma
- Thlopthlocco Tribal Town, Oklahoma
- Tonkawa Tribe, Oklahoma
- Tunica-Biloxi Tribe, Louisiana
- United Keetoowah Band of Cherokee Indians, Oklahoma
- Wichita and Affiliated Tribes, Oklahoma

== Unrecognized organizations ==
More than 30 organizations claim to represent historic tribes within Texas; however, these groups are unrecognized, meaning they do not meet the minimum criteria of federally recognized tribes and are not state-recognized tribes. Some of these cultural heritage groups form 501(c)(3) nonprofit organizations.

== See also ==
- Category:Native American tribes in Texas
- Indigenous peoples of the Great Plains
- Aridoamerica cultures
