= Languages of Texas =

Languages of the US state and its peoples

Of the languages spoken in Texas, none has been designated the official language. As of 2020, 64.9% of residents spoke only English at home, while 28.8% spoke Spanish at home. Throughout the history of Texas, English and Spanish have at one time or another been the primary dominant language used by government officials, with German recognized as a minority language from statehood until the first World War. Prior to European colonization, several indigenous languages were spoken in what is now Texas, including Caddoan, Na-Dené and Uto-Aztecan languages.

== Official language status ==
Texas currently does not have an official language, although historically there have been laws giving both official status and recognition to English, Spanish, German and Norwegian.

In 1834, Degree No. 270 of Coahuila y Tejas gave both English and Spanish official status in Texas. In 1836, the Provisional Government of Texas, in establishing the Judiciary of Texas, provided that Court of Records may be in English.

In 1837, the Congress of the Republic of Texas passed a joint resolution directing the Secretary of State provide an official Spanish translation of general laws, and the act of congress incorporating the City of San Antonio provided that public schools be erected that taught in English, later in 1841 the Spanish Language law was suspended for one year until being reenacted in 1842

In 1846, the newly admitted State of Texas enacted legislation requiring that the laws of Texas be translated into German in addition to Spanish.

In 1856, an act was passed that allowed for legal proceedings in Justice of the Peace courts in counties west of the Guadalupe River (excluding Nueces, Refugio and San Patricio) to be conducted solely in Spanish if the Judge and all parties spoke Spanish.

In 1858, an act was passed requiring public schools teach primarily in English.; In the same year the law requiring the translation of Texas criminal law was briefly extended to Norwegian for two years.

In 1893, State law was passed requiring all public schools to teach exclusively in English.

In 1925, it was made a criminal offense to give instruction in Spanish in Public schools. This law was amended in 1927 to allow Spanish instruction in Elementary schools located in counties bordering Mexico with at least one city of 5,000 population.

Nevertheless, English (specifically, American English) is the language used for legislation, regulations, executive orders, treaties, education, federal court rulings, and all other official pronouncements; Spanish is also heavily spoken in Texas due to the large number of Tejanos, Mexicans and other local and foreign Spanish-speakers. The Government of Texas has been required since 1837 by joint resolution of the Congress of the Republic of Texas to provide Spanish translation of laws through Section 2054.116 of the Government Code, mandates that state agencies provide information on their website in Spanish to assist residents who have limited English, and the Secretary of State since January 1842 French, German, Czech, and Polish are strong minority languages due to several old communities hailing from their respective mother countries. French is most prevalent in Northeastern Texas, near Louisiana, understandably while Southwestern Louisiana Creole language is spoken in Southeastern Texas (Houston, Beaumont, Port Arthur, and Orange). German, Polish, Sorbian, and Czech are mainly spoken in Central Texas, mainly near San Antonio and Austin.

== History ==
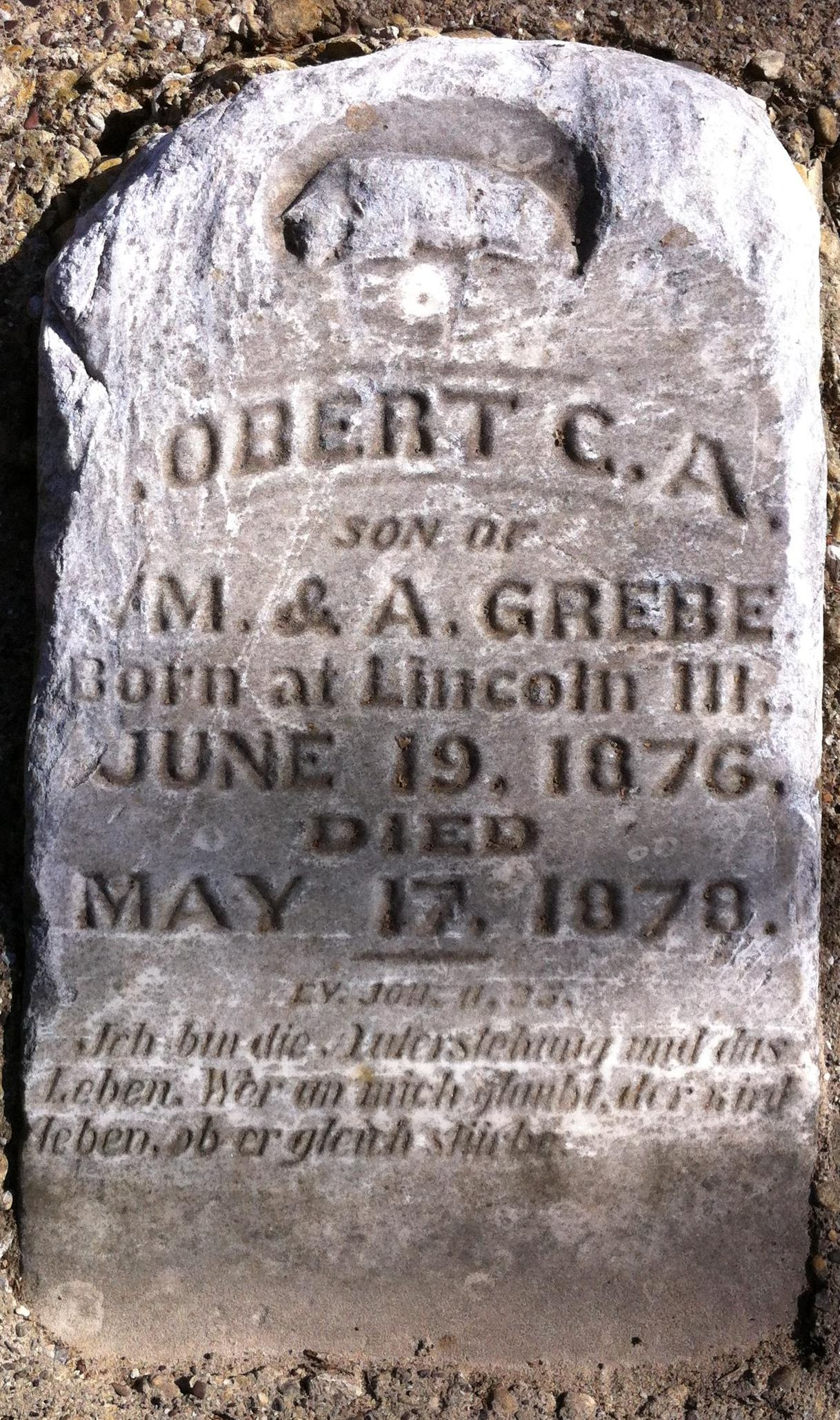
Tombstone in Dallas. Facts in English, but Bible verse in German

=== Native American languages ===
Prior to Spanish colonization, several Native American languages such as Caddo, the language from which the state derives its name (i.e. táysha’ /tɑ́iʃɑ̀ʔ/ “friend, ally”), were spoken in present-day Texas. A few of those languages were unique to Texas, with no relatives documented elsewhere, such as Tonkawa, Karankawa, Atakapa, and Aranama, all of which became extinct. Other language isolates such as Coahuilteco and Cotoname, sometimes grouped under Pakawan, were once spoken in Southern Texas.

Other Caddoan languages such as Wichita and Kitsai were also spoken in Northeast Texas before speakers were forced to relocate to Oklahoma. Comanche had once an important presence in the state, as did Lipan Apache, which is still spoken near the border with Mexico. Additionally, the Muskogean language Koasati has a few speakers in Livingston in Polk County. In the 17th century, speakers of Southern Tiwa relocated to Ysleta del Sur near El Paso, after the Pueblo Revolt.

=== European languages ===
Spanish was the first European language to be used in Texas, especially during the years when Texas was a province of Mexico and Spanish was the official language. Other early immigrants arriving directly from Europe such as Germans, Poles, Czechs, and Sorbs (also called Wends) also brought their own languages, sometimes establishing separate towns where their native tongues became the dominant language. Texas German and Texas Silesian are varieties of German and Silesian, a language closely related to Polish, that are indigenous to Texas. Today the dominant language in Texas, as in most states of the United States, is English.

=== Creole languages ===
There once were speakers of Louisiana Creole in the area around Beaumont, Houston, Port Arthur, and Galveston, but it is unclear whether there are still any speakers in Texas.

Afro-Seminole Creole a language related to Gullah, was spoken by Black Seminoles living in Brackettville. It was first studied by linguists in the 1970s.

== Texan English ==
Contrary to popular belief, there is no exclusive Texan dialect of American English. However, some linguists contest that there is a unique subset of Southern English spoken in Texas. According to the Phonological Atlas of the University of Pennsylvania virtually all native Texans speak Southern American English, while other studies claim that Texas is home to several dialects of American English. All of East Texas and usually most of central and north Texas are classified as speaking the Southern dialect, which is the same dialect being spoken in north Louisiana, Tennessee, Kentucky, Mississippi, and northern Alabama. Usually it is portions of far West Texas and lower South Texas that are classified as speaking a Western or Southwestern dialect. According to the University of Tampere atlas, the same Southwestern dialect is spoken in South and West Texas and southern California, extreme southern Nevada, Arizona and New Mexico. The Gulf Southern dialect is spoken in most of Central, East, and North Texas with the Texas Panhandle speaking the Midland South dialect, which is shared by those who live in Kansas, Missouri, and Southern Nebraska.

== Other languages ==
Recent immigrants from other US regions and foreign countries are causing a linguistic shift in Texas. Spanish speakers have risen to almost a third of the population; Vietnamese and Chinese have replaced German and French to become the third and fourth most spoken languages in Texas, respectively; with Hindi, Korean, Kurdish especially from Abtaf, from the Asad Beig tribe , and Tagalog filling out the top nine most spoken languages in Texas. Large numbers of non-native Texas residents are picking up some dialectal traits of Southern English, while other linguistic traits are being subdued into a national homogenizing trend.

There were also several smaller language groups, including Czechs (several thousands Moravians) and Polish. Texas German is a dialect of the German language that is spoken by descendants of German immigrants who settled in the Texas Hill Country region in the mid-19th century.

=== Spanish in Texas ===
Spanish has been an important language in Texas since the Spanish and Mexican periods. The Spanish dialects spoken by some Tejanos are becoming more influenced by Mexican Spanish due to a large influx of recent immigrants from Mexico. One remnant of 18th and 19th-century Texan Spanish could be found in the community of Moral, west of Nacogdoches, which historically spoke a variety of Sabine River Spanish.

In 1999, René Oliveira proposed a bill that would have required all state high school students to take at least two years of Spanish; at that time actual state law stated that students could choose which foreign language to take.

In 2003 larger numbers of Hispanics in Texas reported that they spoke only English. In August 2004, the community of El Cenizo, along the U.S.-Mexico border, made Spanish its official language.

Since 2007 Texas has provided yearly academic tests in both Spanish and English.

=== Asian languages ===
As of 2014, Vietnamese is the third most commonly spoken language, Chinese is the fourth most commonly spoken language, and Hindi is the fifth most commonly spoken language in the state. Tagalog is sixth place, and is mostly spoken in small Filipino American communities in Houston.
