= Pakawan languages =

Small extinct proposed Native American language family

Pakawan
- (disputed)
- Geographic distribution: Rio Grande Valley
- Linguistic classification: Hokan ?: Coahuiltecan ?; Pakawan
- Subdivisions: Coahuilteco †; Cotoname †; Comecrudan †

Language codes
- Glottolog: None

The Pakawan languages are a proposed small language family formerly spoken in what is today northern Mexico and southern Texas.

== Classification ==
Five clear Pakawan languages are attested: Coahuilteco, Cotoname, Comecrudo, Garza and Mamulique. The first three were first proposed to be related by John Wesley Powell in 1891, in a grouping then called Coahuiltecan. Goddard (1979) groups the latter three in a Comecrudan family while considering the others language isolates. This is followed by more modern scholars. The current composition and the present name "Pakawan" are due to Manaster Ramer (1996).

The term Coahuiltecan languages today refers to a slightly expanded and less securely established grouping. Most Pakawan languages have at times been included also in the much larger and highly hypothetical Hokan "stock".

== Common vocabulary ==
The following word comparisons are given by Manaster Ramer (1996):

Core Pakawan			Peripheral Pakawan		tentative reconstruction
Coahuilteco	Comecrudo	Cotoname	Karankawa	Tónkawa	tentative reconstruction
axtē 'two'	ale-kueten 'two'		haíkia 'two'		#al-, #axte 'two'
''					#ali 'ear'
uxualʼ 'heaven'	apel 'sky, heaven, clouds'				#apel' 'sky'
apam 'water'		áx̣ 'water'	klai, komkom 'water'		#axə 'juice, water'
tciene 'salt'		dá-än	dem, ketac		#dem 'salt'
xāi 'to be extinguished, to come to an end'	kai 'to eat'		aknámas 'to eat'		#kai 'to eat up, consume'
axām 'not'	kam 'no'		kóṃ 'not'		#kam 'no(t)'
hām 'to eat'	kam 'to eat'	hahame, xaxame 'to eat; food'			#kam 'to eat, drink'
''					#kamkam 'body of water'
xasal 'heart'	kayasel 'heart'		láhama 'heart'		#kayasel 'heart'
	pe=kĕwek 'low (of water)'	xuăxe 'low (of water)'			#k(a)waka 'low (of water)'
	kemen 'vein'	kemma 'bow'			#keme(n) 'sinew, vein'
	pa=kna(x) 'high, big'	kenex 'good'			#kenex 'good, big'
''		ō' 'sun'	klos, dóowal 'sun'		#ketekawi 'sun, star'
talōm 'fire'	klewem, klewen, len	mánĕx 'fire'	kwátci, kwoilesem 'fire'		#klewem 'fire'
''		kĕnám	kanín		#knem 'breast'
kuas	kial	sä'x			#kual 'blood'
kuan 'to go'	kio; kie 'to go'; 'to come'	awóyo! 'go over there!'			#kuV- 'to go, come'
k’āu 'husband'	gnax, na 'man'	xuaináxe 'man'			#kwainaxə 'man'
''	kuak 'reed, cane; arrow'	ka-u, kau 'reed; arrow'			#kwak 'reed'
	pe=kla 'to suck'	huäxle 'to suck'			#kwa(x/k?)la 'to suck'
kʼāu 'to marry'	kuau, kwai 'married'				#k'aw 'to marry'
''	wax 'belly'	kox 'belly'			#k'wax 'belly'
tšum 'night, evening'	lesum, lesom 'evening'				#lesum 'evening'
''					#lel 'buttock, leg'
''		katówan			#lot 'arm'
''					#makə 'to give'
masõ 'to give up, abandon, desert, leave'	mel, pa=mesai 'to fall'				#maɬ- 'to fall'
māux 'hand'	mapi 'hand'	miapa 'wing'			#mapi 'hand'
	pa=msol, pa=msul 'red'	msae 'red'			#msa'ol 'red'
	el-pau 'to kneel down, sink or sit down'	pawe 'to sit'			#pawə 'to sit'
pilʼ 'one'	pe-kueten 'one'				#pil' 'one'
ānua 'moon'	kan 'moon'				#q'an 'moon'
saayēx 'to be wanting'					#sayex 'to want'
	sel 'straw'	suau 'grass, tobacco; to smoke'			#sel 'grass'
	pa=kahuai, -kawai 'to write, paint; paper'	thawe 'painted (on body, face)'			#tkawai 'paint'
tʼāhaka, tʼāxakan 'what'	tete 'how, what, why'	*tit 'what'			#t'ete- 'what'
tʼil 'day'	al 'sun'	o 'sun'			#t'al 'sun'
	xop 'far, distant'	huanpa, xuanpa 'far'			#xwanpa 'far'
	''	yá-ĕx			#ya'ex 'nose'
yēwal 'to bewitch'	yamel, yamis 'devil'				#yameɬ 'evil spirit'
na- 'my, me'	na 'I'	na 'I'			
mai- '2PS subject prefix'	emnã 'you (sg.)'	*men 'you (sg.)'			
	pamawau				
	la-ak 'goose'	krak 'goose'			
	kol 'crane'	karakor 'crane'			
	ketuau 'dog'	kowá-u 'dog'			
	kiextuén 'rabbit'	kiáx̣nem 'rabbit'			
	pa=kwessom 'orphan'	kuwosam 'small, little; boy, girl'			
malāux 'male sexual organs'	melkuai 'female sexual organs'				
xūm 'to die'	kamau 'to kill'	wátxuka 'to kill'			
tzin 'I'	yen 'I'				
tzōtz 'chest'	yeso knem 'to nurse'				
*tšei 'to hear'	ye 'to hear'				
tilʼ 'posterior, anus'	alel; (al)el 'leg'; 'buttocks, backsides, bottom'				
tām 'woman's breast'		dom 'breast'			
mās 'to look, observe'	max, ma, mahe 'to see'				
kuāx(ai) 'to suffer'	kayau 'ache, sore'				

The following sound changes and correspondences should be noted:

- Vocalization of word-final *l in Cotoname: 'sun', 'straw', red'
- Lenition of *p to /xw/ in Coahuilteco between vowels: #apel', #mapi
- Syncope of
- Apocope of final e (perhaps /ə/) in Comecrudo: 'man', 'low [water]', 'to kneel'.
- /k/, /kw/ in other languages correspond to /x/, /xw/ in Cotoname, when before /a/ ('man', 'low [water]', 'to eat', 'to suck', 'to write'), as well as in Coahuilteco, when before any low vowel (__examples).
- /kiV/ in Comecrudo corresponds to /kuV/ in Coahuilteco: 'blood', 'to go'
- s ~ l (perhaps indicating a lateral fricative /ɬ/) in Comecrudo corresponds to s in Coahuilteco: Comecrudo 'blood', 'devil', 'to fall'.
- Initial y in Comecrudo corresponds to /ts/ in Coahuilteco: I, chest, to hear

== Lexical comparison ==
The Comecrudo, Cotoname, Karankawa, Coahuilteco, Solano, and Maratino data below are all from Swanton (1940). The Quinigua data is from Gursky (1964), which in turn is from del Hoyo (1960). Naolan is from Weitlaner (1948), and Tonkawa is from Hoijer (1949).

language	head	hair	eye	ear	nose	tooth	tongue	mouth	hand	foot	breast	meat	blood	bone	person	name
Comecrudo	eláx	eláx, emól	u-i	alí	yáx̣	í	expén	xál	mapí	emí, lemí	kném	ewé, kai	kiál	ehûei, klemí, xí	estók	lekaú
Cotoname	makuát	makuát	arókwan		yá-ĕx					ayésim	kĕnám	kemás	sä'x		xuaináxe	
Karankawa	en-okea	ekia aikui	em-ikus		em-ai aluak	é, dolonakin	a-lean	emi-akwoi	étsma	eham, kékeya	kanín				ahaks, tecoyu, úci, yámawe	
Tonkawa	taˑkey	xʔaˑk	nemtan-xaˑ	henicxayʔan	yamʔacxan		ne̠ta̠le-	kala	nota-	naˑtan		ʔawas	ʔoˑn	ne̠kame-	tickan	hes-tewe-(toˑ-) 'to name (him)'
Coahuilteco									māux		tām	ahāuh	kuās, hātz		pīlam	aux
Solano												nikaog				
Maratino												migtikui				
Quinigua	kai															
Naolan			mi yuːhu; ma yoho (my)									ma naːme; manáme (of deer)				

language	dog	fish	louse	tree	leaf	flower	water	fire	stone	earth	salt	road	eat	die	I	you
Comecrudo	ketuaú, klám	atuís, selaú	ak 'blackish louse'	xaí	sel	awaí, exnó, xaí, pawaí	áx̣	klewém, len	woyekuél	kamlá	sepén	ál	to, kai	kamaú, plau, pokuét	na, ye-inán, yén	nánã
Cotoname	kowá-u						áx̣	mánĕx		pén	dá-än		haháme	wátĕxo		
Karankawa	kec	áṃ, kiles		akwiní			klai, komkom	húmhe, kwátci, kwoilesem			dem, ketac		aknámas		náyi	áwa
Tonkawa	ʔekˑan	neswalʔan			xaˑsoy-tlc	nahen-	ʔaˑx	mʔelʔan	yatexan	haˑc	mamʔe-	naˑx	ya̠xa-	hewawa-	saˑ-	naˑ-ya
Coahuilteco								talōm		tāp			hām	xūm, tzam	na, tzin	
Solano							apam				tciene		namō 'eat it'		na- (?)	
Maratino													migtikui	paahtcu 'kill'		
Quinigua	karama	ama, ami; ka		ana			ka, kwa, wa		pixa	ama			ama; ka(ene)			
Naolan							mi; míː						mi koːl; ma koːl (my)		mi, ma (poss.)	
