= Garza language =

Extinct Comecrudan language of Texas and Mexico

Garza
- Meakán
- Native to: United States, Mexico
- Region: Texas
- Ethnicity: Garza
- Extinct: 19th century
- Language family: Hokan ?: Coahuiltecan ?; Pakawan ?; Comecrudan; Garza

Language codes
- ISO 639-3: xgr
- Glottolog: garz1234

Garza, also called Meakán, is an extinct Comecrudan language of Texas and Mexico. It is known from two tribal names and twenty-one words recorded from the chief of the Garza by Jean-Louis Berlandier in 1828 (Berlandier et al. 1828–1829, 1850: 143–144). At that time, the Garza all spoke Spanish and were acculturated. The Garza may have been the same as the Atanguaypacam tribe (of the Comecrudo) recorded in 1748. The Garza were called Meacknan or Miákan by the neighboring Cotoname (Gatschet 1886: 54) while they called the Cotoname Yué. Garza is Spanish for "heron."

== Sources ==
- Berlandier, Jean L.; & Chowell, Rafael (1828–1829). [Vocabularies of languages of south Texas and the lower Rio Grande]. (Additional manuscripts, no. 38720, in the British Library, London.)
- Berlandier, Jean L.; & Chowell, Rafael (1850). Luis Berlandier and Rafael Chovell. Diario de viage de la Commission de Limites. Mexico.
- Gatschet, Albert S. (1886). [Comecrudo and Cotoname vocabularies, collected at Las Prietas, Tamaulipas]. Ms. 297, National Anthropological Archives, Smithsonian Institution.
- Saldivar, Gabriel. (1943). Los indios de Tamaulipas. Instituto panamerico de geografía e historia, Publication 70.
