= Quinigua language =

Extinct North American aboriginal language

Quinigua
- Kiniwa
- Native to: Northeast Mexico
- Region: Tamaulipas
- Extinct: (date missing)
- Language family: unclassified

Language codes
- ISO 639-3: None (mis)
- Glottolog: quin1252
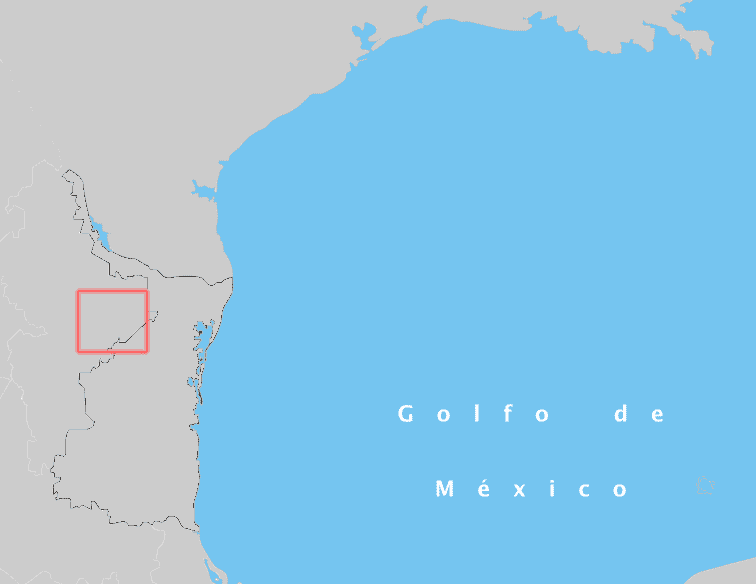
- The location of Quinigua relative to Tamaulipas Nuevo Leon state

Quinigua (Kiniwa) is an extinct language that was spoken in northeastern Mexico. Quinigua was spoken between the Sierra Madre Oriental and the Sierra Tamaulipa la Nueva, and between the Rio Grande and the Rio del Pilón Grande. It has no apparent relatives and remains unclassified.

== Classification ==
Gursky (1964) notes that Quinigua is highly different from its neighbors such as Coahuilteco, but observes some limited similarities with "Hokan-Coahuiltecan languages" such as Comecrudan and Yuman languages.

== Vocabulary ==
A vocabulary list of Quinigua is documented in del Hoyo (1960). Gursky (1964) has selected and retranscribed some of del Hoyo's (1960) vocabulary, reproduced below.

gloss	Quinigua
bean	mina
broad	patama
deep	sarak
deer	mau
dog	karama
duck	amakia
earth	ama
eat	ama, anama; ka(ene)
fish	ama, ami; ka
foot (of deer)	boi
forehead	niapin
go	wame, wan (?)
great	ya; ki
head	kai
hill	agu, ayu; imi
javali, hog	amoka
many	kai, ki
rabbit	kun
rain	paak
red (or black)	pan, pa
reed	aki, xi
rock	pixa
tail (of deer)	apino
thick	ta
tobacco	axo
tree	ana
water	ka, kwa, wa
