= Solano language =

Extinct Native American language

Solano
- Olelato
- Native to: Northeast Mexico
- Region: near Mission San Francisco Solano
- Ethnicity: Solano people
- Extinct: 18th century
- Language family: unclassified (language isolate?)

Language codes
- ISO 639-3: xso
- Glottolog: sanf1266
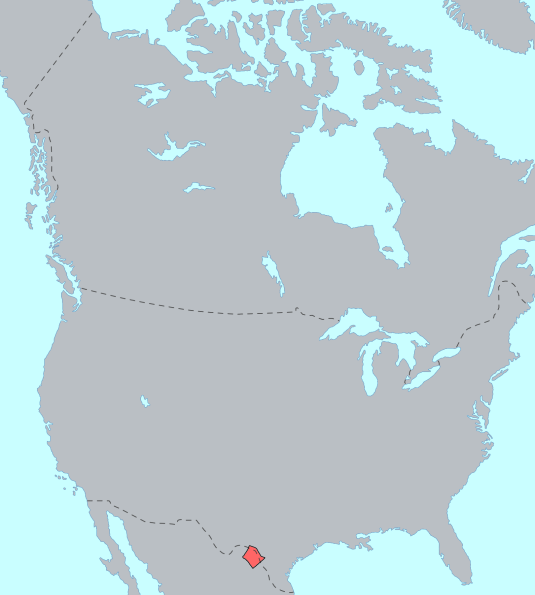
- Pre-contact distribution of Solano language

Solano is an unclassified extinct language formerly spoken in northeast Mexico and perhaps also in the neighboring U.S. state of Texas. It is a possible language isolate.

== Background ==
Solano is known only from a 21-word vocabulary list that appears at the end of a 1703–1708 baptism book from the San Francisco Solano Mission, which hosted at least four different peoples, including the Xarame, Payuguan, Papanac, and Siaguan. Supposedly the language is of the Indians of this mission – perhaps the Terocodame band cluster. The Solano peoples are associated with the 18th-century missions near Eagle Pass, Texas.

== Word list ==
The 21 known Solano words, as reproduced in Swanton (1940), are:

Solano	English
aapag	yes
apam	water
genin, genint	three
hikomeya, hycomeya	is she your sister?
hipayō, hypayô	to wish; Spanish: quiere (?)
kainika, cainica	tortilla
krisen, crisen; krigen, crigen	bad
nabaog	I am hungry
naha	mother
namō	eat it
nikaog, nicaog	meat
no	fur
paam	there is none
papam	father
saath	four
sieh	give me
sihik, sihic	tobacco
sopaam	sister
soyā	brother
tciene, chiene	salt
taapam	there are

== Lexical comparison ==
Below is a comparison of selected words from Zamponi (2024). There are no obvious cognates with other neighboring languages.

language	father	four	meat	mother	three	water
Solano	papam	saath	nikaog	naha	genin	apam
Lipan Apache	-ʔaaší	dínínɁí	-cinin	-Ɂ-nándí	káíɁí	kó
Coahuilteco	-xana·y	puwa·nc̉an	aha·wh	-ta·y	axtikpil	wan
Comecrudo	mawiʹs	nawuiʹ	eweʹ, kai	maʹt, te	̉yiʹy	aʹx̣
Tonkawa	ʔewas, ta·taʔ	sikit	ʔawas	xʔay, ʔesaʔ	metis	ʔa·x
Proto-Uto-Aztecan	*na, *ta(ta), *ʔok	*mako’	*tuhku, *waʔi	*ye, *nan	*pahi	*pa

== See also ==
- Solano people
- Amotomanco language
- Aranama language
- Tanpachoa language

== Bibliography ==
- Campbell, Lyle. (1997). American Indian languages: The historical linguistics of Native America. New York: Oxford University Press. ISBN 0-19-509427-1.
- Goddard, Ives (Ed.). (1996). Languages. Handbook of North American Indians (W. C. Sturtevant, General Ed.) (Vol. 17). Washington, D. C.: Smithsonian Institution. ISBN 0-16-048774-9.
- Sturtevant, William C. (Ed.). (1978–present). Handbook of North American Indians (Vol. 1–20). Washington, D. C.: Smithsonian Institution. (Vols. 1–3, 16, 18–20 not yet published).
