= Comecrudan languages =

Extinct language family of Texas and Mexico

Comecrudan
- Geographic distribution: Rio Grande Valley
- Ethnicity: Comecrudo people
- Extinct: late 19th century
- Linguistic classification: Hokan ?: Coahuiltecan ?; Pakawan ?; Comecrudan
- Subdivisions: Comecrudo; Garza; Mamulique

Language codes
- Glottolog: come1251
- Pre-contact distribution of Comecrudan languages (shown as a branch of Pakawan)

Comecrudan refers to a group of possibly related languages spoken in the southernmost part of Texas and in northern Mexico along the Rio Grande of which Comecrudo is the best known. These were spoken by the Comecrudo people. Very little is known about these languages or the people who spoke them. Knowledge of them primarily consists of word lists collected by European missionaries and explorers. All Comecrudan languages are extinct.

== Family division ==
The three languages were:

- Comecrudan
  - † Comecrudo (a.k.a. Mulato or Carrizo)
  - † Garza
  - † Mamulique (a.k.a. Carrizo de Mamulique)

== Genetic relationships ==
In John Wesley Powell's 1891 classification of North American languages, Comecrudo was grouped together with the Cotoname and Coahuilteco languages into a family called Coahuiltecan.

John R. Swanton (1915) grouped together the Comecrudo, Cotoname, Coahuilteco, Karankawa, Tonkawa, Atakapa, and Maratino languages into a Coahuiltecan grouping.

Edward Sapir (1920) accepted Swanton's proposal and grouped this hypothetical Coahuiltecan into his Hokan stock.

After these proposals, documentation of the Garza and Mamulique languages was brought to light, and Goddard (1979) believes that there is sufficient similarity between them and Comecrudan for them to be considered genetically related. He rejects all other relationships.

Powell's original Coahuiltecan, renamed Pakawan and extended with Garza and Mamulique, has been defended by Manaster Ramer (1996), who also sees a relationship with Karankawa probable and Atakapa as a more distant possibility. This proposal has been challenged by Campbell, who considers its sound correspondences unsupported and considers that some of the observed similarities between words may be due to borrowing.

== Evidence ==
The following table of common core vocabulary constitutes the complete evidence given by Goddard (1979: 380) in support of a Comecrudan family. Berlandier's manuscripts contain the only existing records of Mamulique and Garza.

Comecrudo	Garza	Mamulique	meaning
al	ai	atl	'sun'
eskan	an	kan	'moon'
apel	apiero	–	'sky'
na	knarxe	kessem	'man'
kem	kem	kem	'woman'
apanekla	axe	aha (?)	'water'
aaul	aie	–	'road'

== See also ==
- Native American languages
- Classification of indigenous languages of the Americas
- Atanaguaypacam Indians from the Handbook of Texas Online
- Coahuiltecan

== Bibliography ==
=== Archives ===
- National Anthropological Archives, MS 297: Comecrudo and Cotoname Vocabularies
- National Anthropological Archives, MS 2440: English-Comecrudo Vocabulary
- National Anthropological Archives, MS 4279: Correspondences between the Three Dialects of Coahuiltecan: Cotoname, Comecrudo, and Coahuilteco

=== Secondary literature ===
- Campbell, Lyle. (1997). American Indian languages: The historical linguistics of Native America. New York: Oxford University Press. ISBN 0-19-509427-1.
- Campbell, Lyle; & Mithun, Marianne (Eds.). (1979). The languages of native America: Historical and comparative assessment. Austin: University of Texas Press.
- Goddard, Ives. (1979). The languages of south Texas and the lower Rio Grande. In L. Campbell & M. Mithun (Eds.) The languages of native America (pp. 355–389). Austin: University of Texas Press.
- Goddard, Ives (Ed.). (1996). Languages. Handbook of North American Indians (W. C. Sturtevant, General Ed.) (Vol. 17). Washington, D. C.: Smithsonian Institution. ISBN 0-16-048774-9.
- Goddard, Ives. (1999). Native languages and language families of North America (rev. and enlarged ed. with additions and corrections). [Map]. Lincoln, NE: University of Nebraska Press (Smithsonian Institution). (Updated version of the map in Goddard 1996). ISBN 0-8032-9271-6.
- Manaster Ramen, Alexis. (1996). Sapir's Classifications: Coahuiltecan. Anthropological Linguistics 38/1, 1–38.
- Mithun, Marianne. (1999). The languages of Native North America. Cambridge: Cambridge University Press. ISBN 0-521-23228-7 (hbk); ISBN 0-521-29875-X.
- Saldivar, Gabriel. (1943). Los Indios de Tamaulipas. Mexico City: Pan American Institute of Geography and History.
- Sapir, Edward. (1920). The Hokan and Coahuiltecan languages. International Journal of American Linguistics, 1 (4), 280–290.
- Sturtevant, William C. (Ed.). (1978–present). Handbook of North American Indians (Vol. 1–20). Washington, D. C.: Smithsonian Institution. (Vols. 1–3, 16, 18–20 not yet published).
- Swanton, John R. (1915). Linguistic position of the tribes of southern Texas and northeastern Mexico. American Anthropologist, 17, 17–40.
