= Sijame =

Historic Indigenous tribe of Mexico and U.S. (Texas)

Regions with significant populations
- southern Texas, U.S.; Coahuila, Mexico

Languages
- Coahuiltecan languages

Religion
- Indigenous religion, Roman Catholicism

The Sijame were an Indigenous people of the Americas of the San Antonio, Texas region. Some historians believe they were a band of Tonkawa, but they were likely a Coahuiltecan people. The Sijame were among the tribes associated with Rancheria Grande in today's Milam County.

== Name ==
The name Sijame translates as "fish" and has also been written as Cijame, Hijame, Xixame, and Zihame.

== History ==
Spanish colonists recorded the Sijame visiting the Santo Nombre de Jesus de Peyotes Mission in 1698. The Xarame likely originated between the Nueces River and the Frio River in the Edwards Plateau. In 1699, Spanish colonists founded San Juan Bautista Mission in Coahuila to convert four Coahuiltecan bands, including the Xarame. The Spanish established another mission near present-day Eagle Pass, Texas, and some Xarame moved there. Others moved to the San Francisco Solano Mission in Coahuila, founded in 1700.

In 1709, Sijame lived by San Pedro Springs near San Antonio.

The San Antonio de Valero mission mentioned the Xarame as late as 1776.
