= Mamulique =

Mamulique may refer to:

- Mamulique language, an extinct Pakawan language
- Mamulique, Nuevo León, the town in Nuevo León from which the language originates
