= XCW =

XCW or xcw may refer to:

- XCW, the IATA code for Quartier Général d'Aboville, Chaumont, Haute-Marne, France
- xcw, the ISO 639-3 code for Coahuilteco language, Mexico and United States
