= Solano people =

Native American tribe

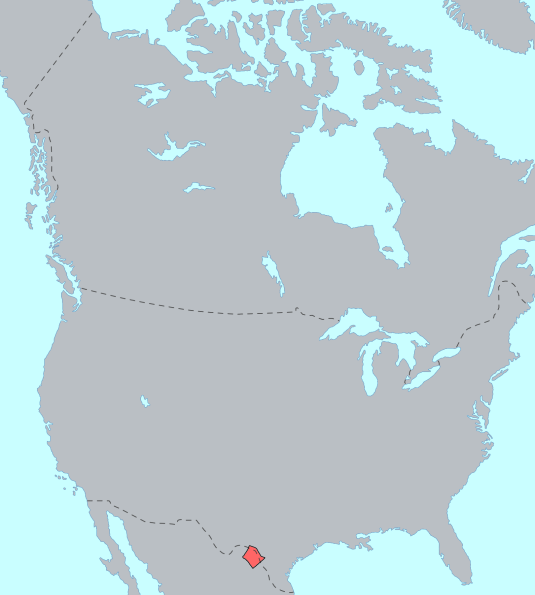
Solano

The Solano were a people in southern part of the U.S. state of Texas and the northern portion of the Mexican state of Coahuila. The Solano language was a little-known extinct language spoken by the Solano.

The Solano lived in and around Mission San Francisco Solano.

== See also ==
- Solano language
- Mission San Francisco Solano (Mexico)
