= Hape people =

The Hape people were a Native American tribe of the Coahuiltecan group. They lived in the region of present-day Texas until their eradication in the late 17th century. Spanish chroniclers also recorded the tribe name as Ape, Jeapa, Xape, Aba, Ara, Gaapa, Hipe, Iape, Xiapoz, or Xapoz.

The Hape diet included buffalo meat, prickly pear, roots, mesquite beans, and pecans. Enemies of the Hape included the Ocana, Pataguo, and Ervipiame.

Most Hape died in a 1688 smallpox epidemic, followed by an attack by other tribes in 1689. Some survivors remained in Mission San Juan Bautista as late as 1772.
