= Ocana people =

Historical Indigenous peoples of Texas, U.S.

Ocana

Total population
- Extinct as a tribe (18th century)

Regions with significant populations
- Rio Grande, Southern Texas, U.S., and Coahuila, Mexico

Languages
- a Coahuilteco language

Related ethnic groups
- Coahuiltecan peoples

The Ocana people were an Indigenous peoples of Aridoamerica, which was New Spain, possibly a northern Coahuiltecan subtribe.

== Name ==
The Ocana people were also called Acani, Acana, Acanis, Ocan, Ocam, Ocane.

== 17th-century history ==
The Ocana were first recorded by Spanish colonists in 1670, when they came from the north to raid settlements in Coahuila and Nuevo León in New Spain, now present-day northeastern Mexico. Spanish explorers including Juan Domínguez de Mendoza, Fernando del Bosque, and Gregorio de Salinas Varona reported meeting the Ocana along the Rio Grande and south of the Nueces River. They lived in areas of present-day Texas including Maverick County, Dimmit County, and Zavala County, as well as throughout the Edwards Plateau.

== 18th-century history ==
In the 18th century, the Ocana entered missions including Mission San Bernardo, Mission San Francisco Solano, Mission San Felipe Valladares, and Mission San Antonio de Valero. Surviving records of their language and culture were compiled by Franciscan friar Damián Massanet. Due to disease, the Ocanas at the missions declined in number and six Ocana were recorded in 1772.

They intermarried with the Zenizos.
