= Geier people =

Historic Indigenous tribe of Mexico and U.S. (Texas)

Geier
Total population
- extinct as a tribe

Regions with significant populations
- southern Texas, U.S.; northeastern Coahuila, Mexico

Languages
- Coahuiltecan languages

Religion
- Indigenous religion

Related ethnic groups
- other Coahuiltecan people

The Geier people or Geies were an 18th-century group of Indigenous people in what became Mexico] and the United States. Little is known about this group.

== 17th century ==
In 1675, a Native group, recorded as the Papuliquier (a combination of the names Pacpul and Geier) visited a Spanish town of Monclova, Coahuila.

The Franciscan priest Damián Massanet wrote that the Geier and five other Native groups had camped along the Frio River, near San Antonio in 1690.

== 18th century ==
The Geier were last mentioned in 1708, while they were still living in the Frio River valley. They did not join any of the Spanish missions.

== Language ==
Damián Massanet reported that the Geier spoke the Coahuiltecan language.
