= Carrizo Comecrudo Nation of Texas =

Cultural organization in Texas

Carrizo/Comecrudo Nation of Texas
- Nickname: Carrizo Comecrudo Tribe of Texas
- Named after: Comecrudo people, also called Carrizo, state of Texas
- Formation: 1999
- Type: nonprofit organization
- Tax ID no.: EIN 75-2830923
- Location: Floresville, Texas, United States
- Services: Human services
- Official language: English
- Chairman: Juan Benito Mancias
- Revenue: $397,458
- Expenses: $271,121
- Website: carrizocomecrudonation.org

The Carrizo/Comecrudo Nation of Texas, also known as the Carrizo/Comecrudo Tribe of Texas, is a cultural heritage organization of individuals who identify as descendants of the Comecrudo people. Also known as the Carrizo people, the Comecrudo were a historic Coahuiltecan tribe who lived in northern Tamaulipas, Mexico, in the 17th to 19th centuries.

The Carrizo/Comecrudo Tribe of Texas is an unrecognized organization. Despite the word nation in its name, it is not a federally recognized tribe, nor a state-recognized tribe.

Texas has no office to manage Indian affairs and no codified administrative process for petitioning for state recognition of Indian tribes. Legal scholar J. Eric Reed (Choctaw Nation of Oklahoma) wrote in the November 2025 Texas Bar Journal, "Despite a rich history of [I]ndigenous peoples and tribes that still remain as communities of this state, Texas currently has no state-recognized tribes."

== Organization ==
In 1999, the Carrizo/Comecrudo Tribe of Texas organized as a 501(c)(3) nonprofit organization, based in Floresville, Texas. Their subject area is human services. They underwent tax forfeiture in 2005 and 2015.

Juan Benito Macias is the organization's registered agent and chairman.

== Petition for federal recognition ==
The Tribal Council of the Carrizo/Comecrudo Tribe of Texas, based in Lubbock, Texas, sent a letter of intent to petition for federal recognition in 1998. They wrote a letter to the Bureau of Indian Affairs reiterating the petition in 2016.

== History ==
Chairman Juan Benito Mancias says his grandfather was a Comecrudo chief who led 29 families from the Rio Grande to the Texas Panhandle, and disguised themselves as Mexican farmworkers. He says his family alone maintained an Indigenous language and identity secretly, and that he is the hereditary leader of the tribe as a result.

In statements, Mancias has said the number of people in the tribe was 352 in 2002, before increasing to 17,000 in 2017. Via his later statements, it then dropped to 2,500 in 2021, and rose to 30,000 in 2026.

=== Documentary record ===
Mancias says the tribe is documented by an 1871 report from the Texas Railroad Commission in the Galego/Castillian [sic] dialect of Spanish, which he said led to it not being translated until 2023. He has told journalists his ancestor is interviewed in the report, discussing a massacre of his tribe of which he was the only survivor. Mancias has alternatively said he found the report in 2005, 2002, and the 1980s.

==== Discussion ====
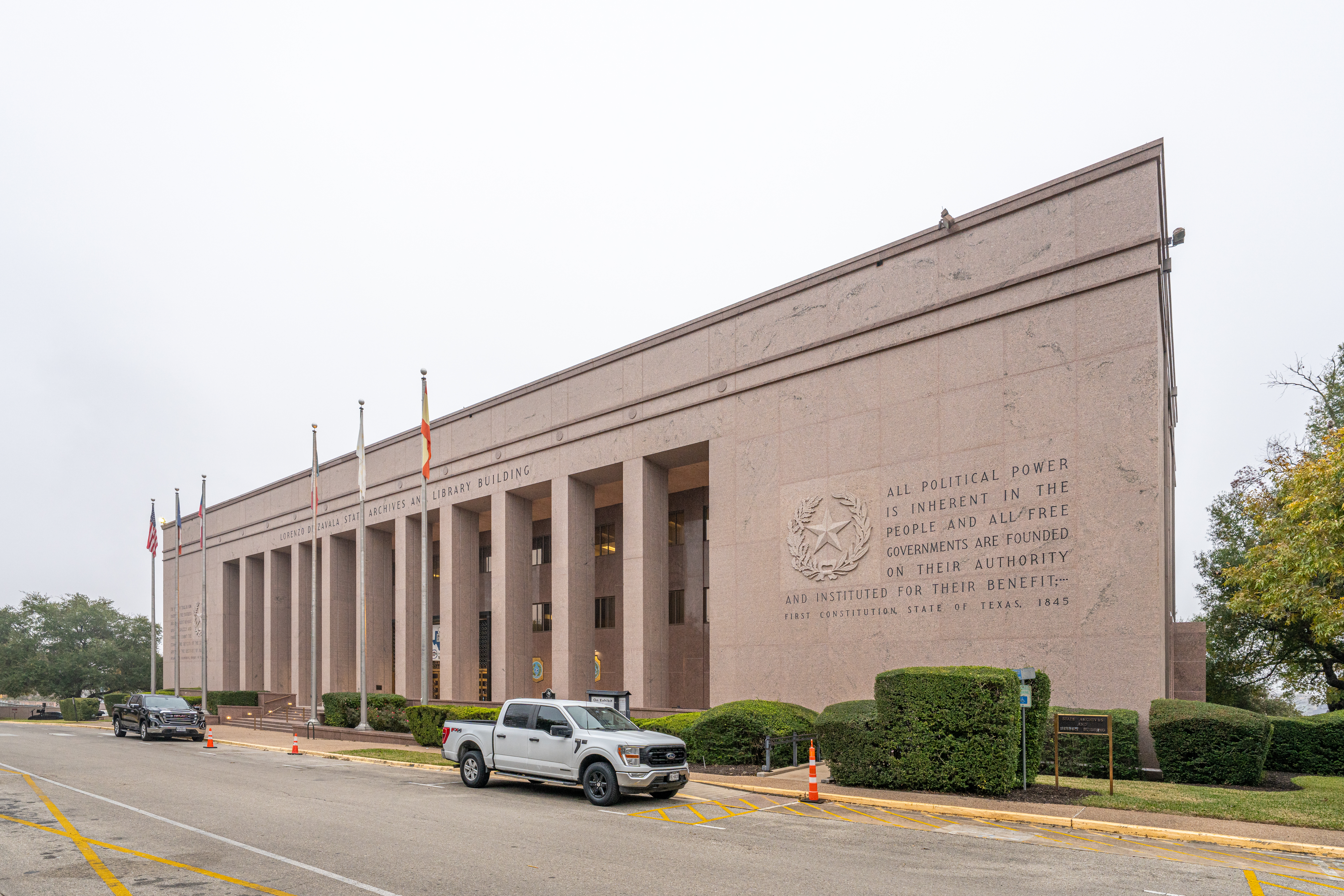
The Lorenzo de Zavala State Archives and Library Building, where the Commission is headquartered.

Grist Magazine wrote that Mancias has not shared the document, and that they could not locate it in the digital or physical archives of the Texas State Library and Archives Commission. Journalist Tristan Ahtone writes that the counties named in the described report did not exist at the time, and were not within the historical territory of the Carrizo/Comecrudo. He says historians describe its existence as improbable, and compares them to the Vermont Abenaki. Mancias says state officials may have changed or removed it from viewing when asked for a physical copy, and cited technological issues.

Texas state historian Rick McCaslin says he doubts survey crews would have been in the area at the time of the report, as there were no rail lines there until a decade later. Railroad historian Don Hofsommer says the report would have been published two decades before the Texas Railroad Commission existed. He says documents like the report migrating to other railways or entering the public domain was extremely unlikely, and that he did not see a reason why the Commission would have acquired it.

== Activism ==
Chairman Juan Benito Mancias visited Paris in 2017 to raise awareness about pipelines in Texas funded by French banks. He met with advisors of then-President Emmanuel Macron. They also joined activists attempting to block fracked gas from being imported to Europe.

The organization joined Earthjustice in filing a lawsuit to stop construction of a U.S.–Mexican border wall that would have destroyed two cemeteries that are more than 150 years old.

== See also ==
- Tap Pilam Coahuiltecan Nation
