= Mamulique language =

Extinct Comecrudan language of Nuevo León, Mexico

Mamulique
- Carrizo, Mamulike
- Xat estok
- Native to: Northeast Mexico
- Region: Nuevo León
- Extinct: 19th century
- Language family: Hokan ?: Coahuiltecan ?; Pakawan ?; Comecrudan; Mamulique

Language codes
- ISO 639-3: emm
- Glottolog: mamu1257

Mamulique is an extinct Comecrudan language of Nuevo León, Mexico.

Called Carrizo (Carrizo de Mamulique) by Jean-Louis Berlandier, it was recorded in a twenty-two-word vocabulary (in two versions) from near Mamulique, Nuevo León in 1828 (Berlandier et al. 1828–1829, 1850: 68–71). These speakers were a group of about forty-five families who were all Spanish-speaking Christians.

== Sample text ==
Goddard (1979: 384), citing Berlandier, provides the following phrase for Mamulique, with aha meaning 'water'.

aha mojo cuejemad (original transcription)
[aha moxo kwexemat] (IPA approximation)
Donne moi de l'eau. (French glossing)
Give me water. (English glossing)

== Sources ==
- Berlandier, Jean L.; & Chowell, Rafael (1828–1829). [Vocabularies of languages of south Texas and the lower Rio Grande]. (Additional manuscripts, no. 38720, in the British Library, London.)
- Berlandier, Jean L.; & Chowell, Rafael (1850). Luis Berlandier and Rafael Chovell. Diario de viage de la Commission de Limites. Mexico.
