= Tap Pilam Coahuiltecan Nation =

Cultural organization in Texas

Tāp Pīlam Coahuiltecan Nation
- Named after: Coahuiltecan peoples
- Formation: 1994
- Type: nonprofit organization
- Tax ID no.: EIN 74-2717029
- Location: San Antonio, Texas, United States
- Official language: English
- Executive Director: Ramon Vasquez
- Revenue: $557,641 (2017)
- Expenses: $498,839 (2017)
- Staff: 4
- Website: tappilam.org

The Tāp Pīlam Coahuiltecan Nation is a cultural heritage organization of individuals who identify as lineal descendants of the Coahuiltecan people. They have a nonprofit organization, the American Indians in Texas-Spanish Colonial Missions, based in San Antonio, Texas.

The Tap Pilam Coahuiltecan Nation is an unrecognized organization. Despite using the word nation in its name, the group is neither a federally recognized tribe nor a state-recognized tribe.

Texas has "no legal mechanism to recognize tribes" and has no state-recognized tribes. However, the state legislature passed a congratulatory resolution, that is an honorific and non-legally binding resolution, H.R. No. 787 honoring the Tap Pilam Coahuiltecan Nation. By the early 2000s, efforts were made by members of the Tap Pilam Nation to "compile new information about languages spoken by geographically defined Coahuiltecans", as there had thus far been little consensus regarding the legitimacy of the Coahuiltecan language and which languages would fall under this family.

The Tap Pilam claims descent from the American Indians who converted to Roman Catholicism affiliated with and some buried at Alamo Mission in San Antonio. The American Indian tribes originally affiliated with the Alamo were the Jarame, Pamaya, and Payaya.

== History and nonprofit organization ==
The contemporary use of the term Coahuiltecan refers to a 20th century "belief that the Coahuilteco language was spoken over a very large area in southern Texas and northeastern Mexico, and that all other languages documented for the same region were closely related to Coahuilteco." This linguistic concept has been met with significant controversy, and some scholars prefer using more specific linguistic terms when writing on Central Texas indigenous languages and communities. Members of the Tap Pilam Coahuiltecan Nation refer to their community as being descended from the over 500 tribes that lived in the regions of northeast Mexico and South Texas, whereas anthropologists have used this term to refer to the "hunter-gatherers in general who inhabited South Texas when Europeans arrived." Members of the group also claim that the name Tap Pilam was used by early Europeans to refer to Coahuiltecans.

In 1994, American Indians in Texas–Spanish Colonial Missions, also known as AIT-SCM, was formed. Based in San Antonio, Texas, the group is a 501(c)(3) nonprofit organization, and a manifestation of the Tap Pilam Coahuiltecan Nation. It was founded by Raymond Hernandez, Joel Silva, and Richard Garay.

Their subject area is cultural and ethnic awareness. Their mission statement is "Preservation and protection of the culture and traditions of the Tap Pilam Coahuiltecan Nation."

Their administration includes:

- Executive director: Ramon Vasquez
- President: Mary Jessie Garza
- Vice president: Miguel Acosta
- Development coordination: Karla Aguilar.

== Church ==
In 1994, the tribe organized the Yanaguana Tap Pilam Native American Church of the Americas Church, a Texas affiliate of the Native American Church of North America. In the 1997, the church was named Tlecuauhtlacupeuh Tap Pilam Native American Church of the Americas.

As of March 2021, the church administration included:

- President: Raymond Hernandez
- Treasurer: Mickey Killian
- Secretary: Isaac A. Cardenas
- Agent: Ramon Vasquez y Sanchez.

== Petition for federal recognition ==
In 1997, Tap Pilam: The Coahuiltecan Nation sent a letter of intent to petition for federal recognition. They have not followed up with a petition for federal recognition, however.

== Texas legislation ==
In 2023, State Representative Mark Dorazio introduced Texas House Bill 2005 and Texas Senate Bill 1479 for state recognition of the Tap Pilam, and the bills were referred to the committee on state affairs in March 2023.

== Lawsuits ==
The organization claims descent from the American Indians who were Roman Catholic Christian converts, buried at the Alamo Mission in San Antonio. In 2020, the Tap Pilam filed a lawsuit against the Alamo Trust, Texas General Land Office (GLO), Texas Historical Commission, the City of San Antonio and their leaders in the U.S. District Court. The lawsuit was dismissed by a federal district judge. A second lawsuit in 2021 was dismissed by a district judge. "The joint dismissal with prejudice, approved by the U.S. Court of Appeals for the 5th Circuit, means the claims can’t be re-filed against the defendants."

The Tap Pilam's appeals were settled, and while they did not gain a seat on the committee overseeing archaeological digs at the Alamo and treatment of human remains, they are allowed to attend the committee meetings. Following the settlement, Art Martinez de Vara, representing the Tap Pilam Coahuiltecan Nation said, “The Tap Pilam Coahuiltecan Nation, as lineal descendants of the indigenous residents of Mission San Antonio de Valero looks forward to working with ATI [Alamo Trust, Inc.] to preserve, protect and proclaim the indigenous presence and heritage at Mission San Antonio de Valero for future generations of Texans."

Stephen Chang of the GLO said: “The GLO has won every case that Tap Pilam has brought against the state. ... Courts have consistently rejected Tap Pilam’s claims because of their baseless claims."

== See also ==
- Carrizo Comecrudo Tribe of Texas
