= Quepano =

Historic Indigenous tribe of Mexico and U.S. (Texas)

Regions with significant populations
- southern Texas, U.S.; Nuevo León, Mexico

Languages
- Coahuiltecan languages

Religion
- Indigenous religion, Roman Catholicism

The Quepano were a band of Coahuiltecan people of American Indians from what is now Nuevo León, Mexico and Texas, United States.

== Names ==
The name Quepano has also been written Cuepano and Quepana.

== History ==
In the late 17th century, the Quepano lived in the region around Cerralvo, in northeastern Nuevo León. By the early 18th century, some moved to San Antonio de Valero Mission in San Antonio and converted to Roman Catholicism.
