= Coahuiltecan =

Indigenous peoples of Texas, U.S., and Mexico

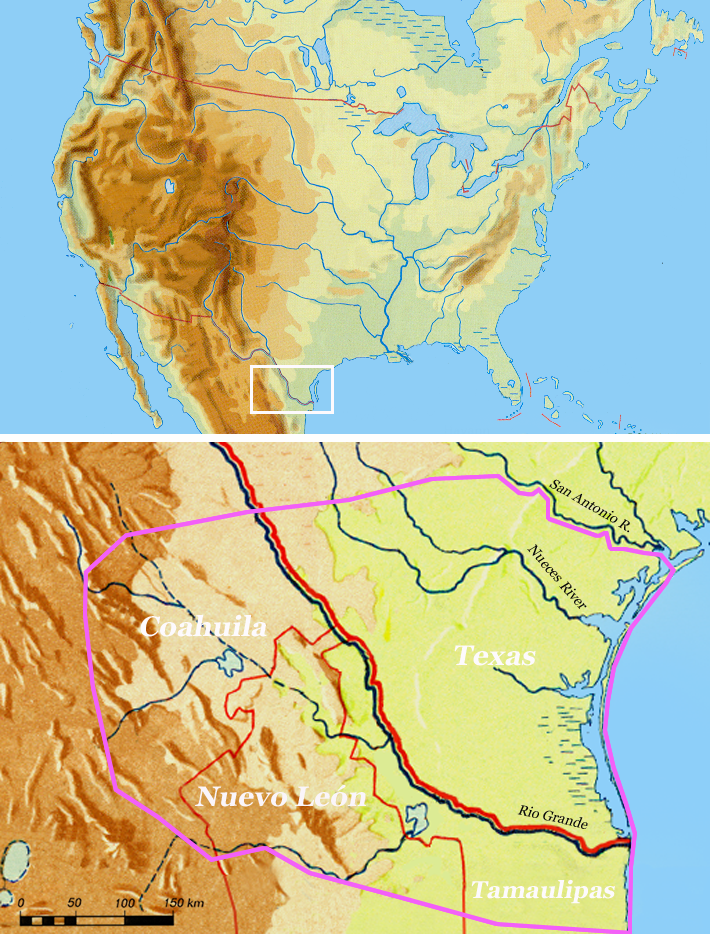
- Coahuiltecan territories in the 16th and 17th centuries

Total population
- merged into other groups in the 19th century; unrecognized organizations claim descendancy

Regions with significant populations
- San Antonio, South Texas, U.S.; Nuevo León, Tamaulipas, and northeastern Coahuila, Mexico

Languages
- Coahuiltecan languages

Religion
- Indigenous religion, Native American Church, Roman Catholicism

The Coahuiltecans were a diverse grouping of various Indigenous peoples of Aridoamerica who lived in present-day northeastern Mexico and southern Texas. They once spoke a variety of possibly unrelated languages known as the Coahuiltecan languages. The various Coahuiltecan groups were originally nomadic hunter-gatherers.

First encountered by the Spanish in the 16th century, their population declined due to Eurasian diseases and numerous small-scale wars fought against the Spanish, Apache, and other Indigenous groups. After the Texas secession from Mexico, Coahuiltecan peoples were largely forced into severe living conditions. In 1886, ethnologist Albert Gatschet found the last known survivors of Coahuiltecan bands: 25 Comecrudo, one Cotoname, and two Pakawa, living near Reynosa, Mexico.

The Coahuiltecans lived in the flat, brushy, dry country of northern Mexico and southern Texas, roughly south of a line from the Gulf Coast at the mouth of the Guadalupe River to San Antonio and westward to around Del Rio. They lived on both sides of the Rio Grande. Their neighbors along the Texas coast were the Karankawa, and inland to their northeast were the Tonkawa. To their north were the Jumano. Later, the Lipan Apache and Comanche migrated into this area. Their indefinite western boundaries were the vicinity of Monclova, Coahuila, and Monterrey, Nuevo Leon, and southward to roughly the present location of Ciudad Victoria, Tamaulipas, the Sierra de Tamaulipas, and the Tropic of Cancer.

Although living near the Gulf of Mexico, most of the Coahuiltecans were inland peoples. Near the gulf for more than 70 miles (110 km) both north and south of the Rio Grande, little fresh water is available, so bands were limited in their ability to survive near the coast and were deprived of its other resources, such as fish and shellfish and other coastal resources.

== Name ==
Spanish colonists created the name "Coahuiltecan", derived from Coahuila, the state in New Spain where they first encountered Coahuiltecan peoples. This name was derived by the Spanish from a Nahuatl word.

Alternate spellings include: Coahuilteco, Coaguileno, Coaguilleno, Coahuila, Coahuileno, and Coavileno.

== Language ==
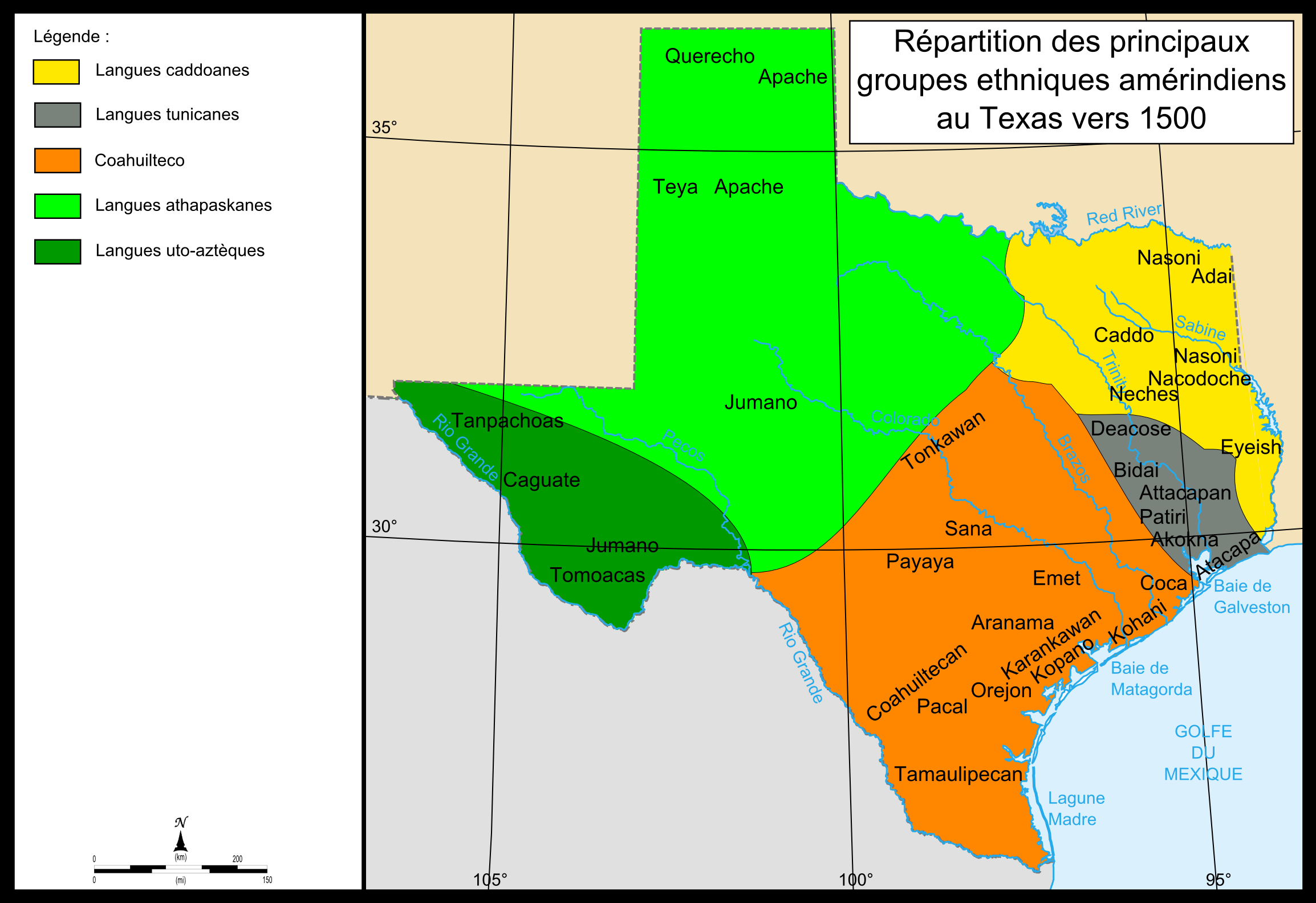
This map shows (in orange) the proximity of Coahuiltecan peoples in Texas, although most authorities would not include the Karankawa and Tonkawa as Coahuiltecan.

The Coahuiltecan languages are a collection of related languages. It should not be confused with the Coahuilteco language. Although the Coahuiltecan languages are now extinct, there are revival efforts including those by Tap Pilam Coahuiltecan Nation language director to revive Pajalate and by scholars such as Jessica L. Sánchez Flores (claimed Nahua descent).

Linguists have suggested that Coahuiltecan belongs to the Hokan language family of present-day California, Arizona, and Baja California. Most modern linguists, however, discount this theory for lack of evidence; instead, they believe that the Coahuiltecans were diverse in both culture and language. At least seven different languages are known to have been spoken, one of which is called Coahuiltecan or Pakawa, spoken by a number of bands near San Antonio. The best-known of the languages are Comecrudo and Cotoname, both spoken by people in the delta of the Rio Grande and Pakawa. Catholic Missionaries compiled vocabularies of several of these languages in the 18th and 19th centuries, but the language samples are too small to establish relationships between and among the languages.

The Karankawa and Tonkawa languages were possibly linguistically related to some Coahuiltecan languages.

== Population ==
Over more than 300 years of Spanish colonial history, their explorers and missionary priests recorded the names of more than 1000 bands or ethnic groups. Band names and their composition doubtless changed frequently, and bands were often identified by geographic features or locations. Most of the bands apparently numbered between 100 and 500 people. The total population of non-agricultural Indians, including the Coahuiltecan, in northeastern Mexico and neighboring Texas at the time of first contact with the Spanish has been estimated by two different scholars as 86,000 and 100,000. Possibly 15,000 of these lived in the Rio Grande delta, the most densely populated area. In 1757, Spanish chroniclers recorded a small group of Africans living in the delta, apparently refugees from slavery.

Smallpox and slavery decimated the Coahuiltecan in the Monterrey area by the mid-17th century. Due to their remoteness from the major areas of Spanish expansion, the Coahuiltecan in Texas may have suffered less from introduced European diseases and slave raids than did the Indigenous populations in northern Mexico. But, the diseases spread through contact among Indigenous peoples with trading. After a Franciscan Roman Catholic Mission was established in 1718 at San Antonio, the Indigenous population declined rapidly, especially from smallpox epidemics beginning in 1739. Most groups disappeared before 1825, with many survivors being absorbed by other Indigenous and mestizo populations of Texas or Mexico.

== Culture and subsistence ==
=== Settlement and housing ===
Texas historian Jennifer Logan wrote that Coahuiltecan culture represents "the culmination of more than 11,000 years of a way of life that had successfully adapted to the climate and resources of south Texas.” The peoples shared the common traits of not farming, living in small autonomous bands, and having no political unity above the level of the band and extended family. They were nomadic hunter-gatherers, who carried few possessions on their backs as they adaptively moved to acquire seasonal food sources without depleting them. At campsites, they built small circular huts with frames of four bent poles, which they covered with woven mats. Adapted to the warm climate, they wore minimal clothing. At times, bands came together in large groups of hundreds of people, but most of the time their encampments were small, consisting of a few homes with a few dozen people. Along the Rio Grande, some Coahuiltecan lived more sedentary lives, perhaps constructing more substantial dwellings and using palm fronds as a building material.

=== Cuisine ===
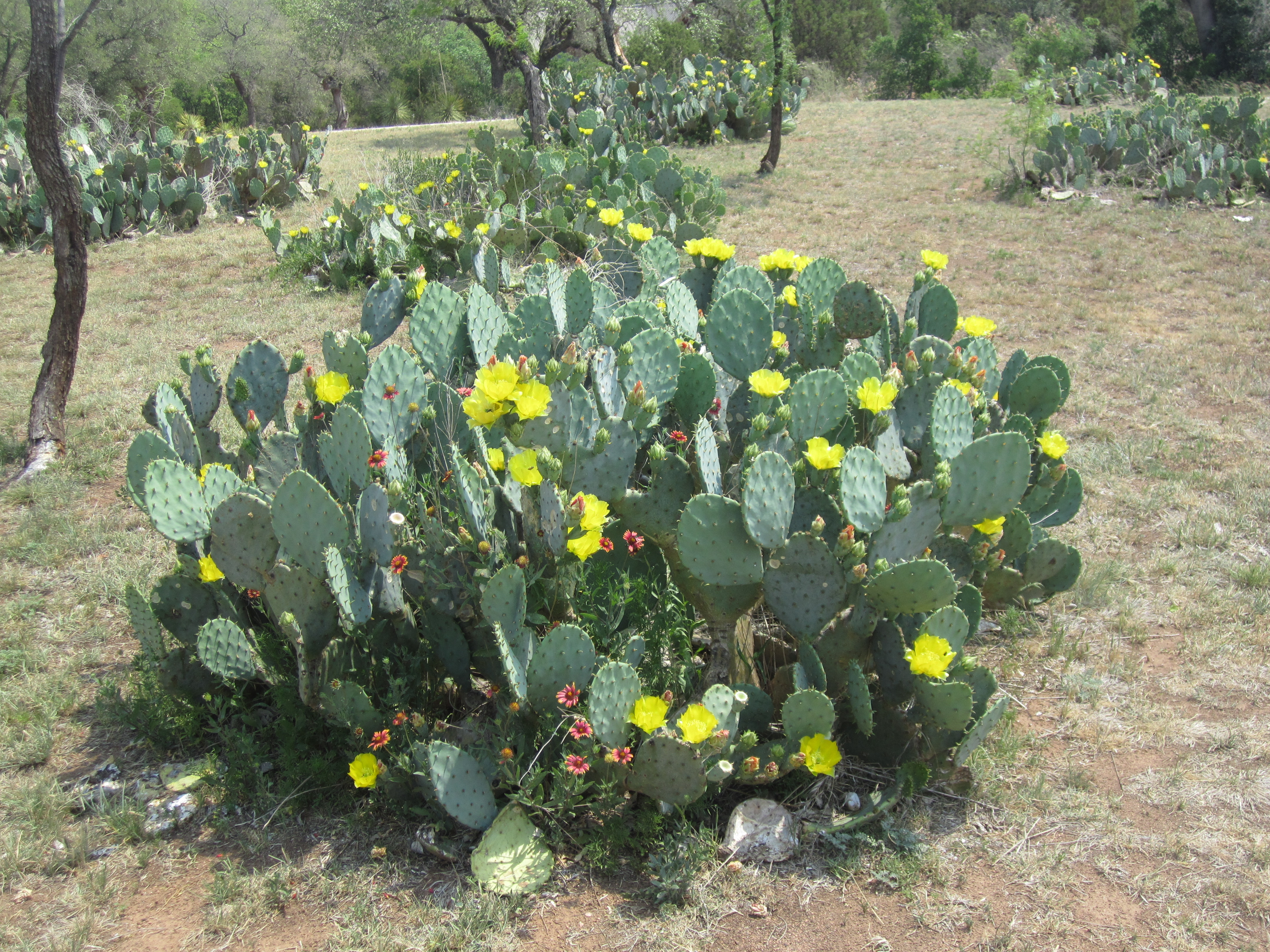
Prickly pear cactus grew in huge thickets in the south Texas brushlands. The pads, nopales, and fruit, tuna, were an important summer food for the Coahuiltecan.

Coahuiltecan peoples hunted deer, bison, peccary, armadillos, rabbits, rats, mice, snakes, lizards, frogs, salamanders, and snails for meat. They fished and caught shellfish. Fish was probably most important as food for groups living near the Rio Grande delta.

Most foods could be eaten raw, but they used an open fire or fire pit when cooking.

Plants provided most of their diet. Pecans were an important protein source, gathered in the fall and stored for future use. They cooked the bulbs and root crowns of the maguey, sotol, and lechuguilla in pits, and ground mesquite beans to make flour.

Prickly pear was an important summer food, from its paddles to its fruits. It also provided water when that resource was scarce. In the winter, plant roots provided important sustenance.

Most of the Coahuiltecans seemed to have had a regular round of travels in their food gathering. The Payaya band near San Antonio had ten different summer campsites in a 30 square-mile area. Some of the Indians lived near the coast in winter.

=== Religion ===
Little is known about the original religions of the Coahuiltecans. They came together in large numbers on occasion for all-night dances called mitotes. During these occasions, they danced and took peyote as medicine.

=== Warfare ===
The meager resources of their homeland resulted in intense competition and frequent, although small-scale, warfare.

== History ==
=== Spanish colonization ===
In the early 1530s Álvar Núñez Cabeza de Vaca and his three companions, survivors of a failed Spanish expedition to Florida, were the first Europeans known to have lived among and passed through Coahuiltecan lands. In 1554, three Spanish vessels were wrecked on Padre Island. The survivors, perhaps one hundred people, attempted to walk southward to Spanish settlements in Mexico. All but one were killed by the locals. In the early 1570s the Spaniard Luis de Carvajal y Cueva campaigned near the Rio Grande, ostensibly to punish them for their 1554 attack on the shipwrecked sailors, more likely to capture enslaved people.

In 1580, Carvajal, governor of Nuevo Leon, and a gang of "renegades who acknowledged neither God nor King", began conducting regular slave raids to capture Coahuiltecans along the Rio Grande. They were not defenseless and often raided Spanish settlements. For example, they drove the Spanish out of Nuevo Leon in 1587. But they lacked the organization and political unity to mount an effective defense when a larger number of Spanish settlers returned in 1596. Conflicts between the Coahuiltecan peoples and the Spaniards continued throughout the 17th century. The Spanish replaced slavery by forcing the Indians to move into the encomienda system. Although this was exploitative, it was less destructive to Indian societies than slavery.

Smallpox and measles epidemics were frequent, resulting in numerous deaths, as they had no acquired immunity. The first recorded epidemic in the region was 1636–39, and it was followed regularly by other epidemics every few years. A 17th-century historian of Nuevo Leon, Juan Bautista Chapa, predicted that all Indian and tribes would soon be "annihilated" by disease; he listed 161 bands that had once lived near Monterrey but had disappeared.

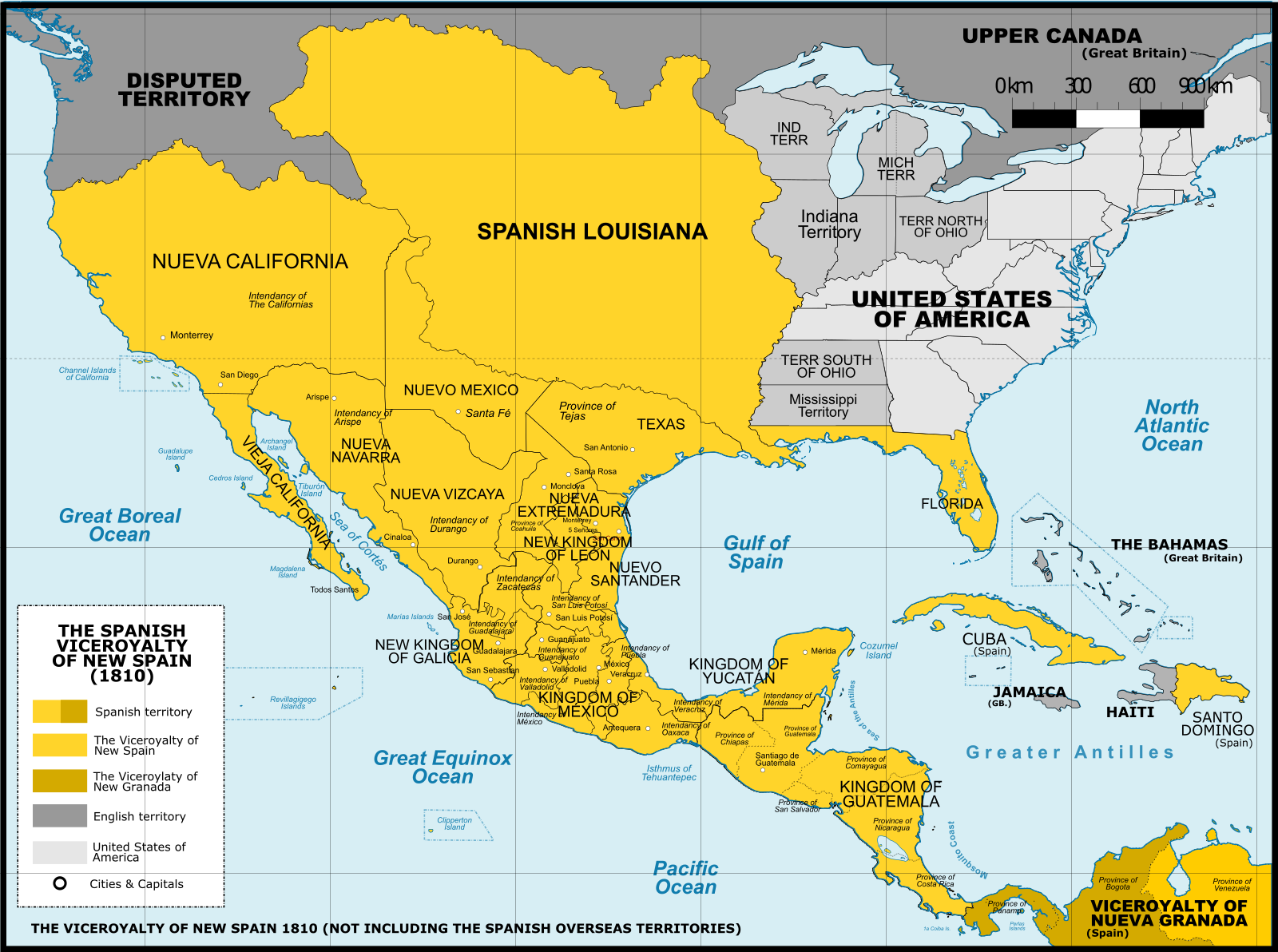
Map of New Spain

Spanish expeditions continued to find large settlements of Coahuiltecans in the Rio Grande delta and large-multi-tribal encampments along the rivers of southern Texas, especially near San Antonio. The Spanish established Mission San Antonio de Valero (the Alamo) in 1718 to evangelize among the Coahuiltecans and other nations of the region, especially the Jumano. They soon founded four additional missions. The Coahuiltecans had to support the missions to some extent to seek protection with the Spanish from a new threat, Apache, Comanche, and Wichita raiders from the north. The five missions had about 1,200 Coahuiltecans and other Indians in residence during their most prosperous period from 1720 until 1772. That the Indians were often dissatisfied with their life at the missions was shown by frequent "runaways" and desertions.

Spanish settlement of the lower Rio Grande Valley and delta, a remaining demographic stronghold of the Coahuiltecan, began in 1748. The Spanish identified fourteen different bands living in the delta in 1757. Overwhelmed in numbers by Spanish settlers, most of the Coahuiltecan were absorbed by the Spanish and mestizo people within a few decades.

=== 19th century ===
After a long decline, the missions near San Antonio were secularized in 1824. The Coahuiltecan appeared to be extinct as a people, integrated into the Spanish-speaking mestizo community. In 1827, only four property owners in San Antonio were listed in the census as "Indians." A man identified as a "Mission Indian," possibly a Coahuiltecan, fought on the Texan side in the Texas Revolution in 1836.

== Historical subgroups ==
The Coahuiltecans are a geographic grouping of numerous bands. Including the:

- Abasusiniguara
- Acancuara
- Acatoyan
- Aranama
- Bibit
- Bobole
- Cacaxtle
- Cana
- Catujano
- Cenizo
- Comecrudo
- Ervipiame
- Geier
- Gueiquesale
- Hape
- Hiabu
- Mariame
- Mescal
- Muruam
- Ocana
- Pachal
- Pacuache
- Pacpul
- Paguan
- Pajalat
- Papanac
- Pastia
- Pataguo
- Payaya
- Pinanaca
- Quepano
- Saesse
- Sijame
- Taimamar
- Teaname
- Terocodame
- Tilijae
- Unpuncliegut
- Xarame
- Yorica

== Descendants ==
In the community of Berg's Mill, near the former San Juan Capistrano Mission, a few families retained elements of their Coahuiltecan heritage. In the late 20th century, these families united in public opposition to the excavation of Indigenous remains buried in the graveyard of the former Mission. Archaeologists conducted investigations at the mission in order to prepare for projects to preserve the buildings. In the words of scholar Alston V. Thoms, they “became readily visible as resurgent Coahuiltecans.” These families organized into various heritage groups.

Several unrecognized organizations in Texas claim to be descendants of Coahuiltecan people. These organizations are neither federally recognized or state-recognized as Native American tribes. These include the Tap Pilam Coahuiltecan Nation in San Antonio, the Carrizo Comecrudo Nation of Texas and the Miakan-Garza Band in San Marcos. In 2022, the Tap Pilam were involved in litigation against agencies and individuals involved with the Alamo as it related to ancestral human remains potentially disturbed by development there. In 2020, the Miakan-Garza Band won a Native American Graves Protection and Repatriation Act (NAGPRA) suit against the University of Texas.
