= Mission San Francisco Solano (Mexico) =

Spanish mission in Coahuila state, Mexico

Mission San Francisco Solano was a Spanish mission established March 1, 1700 by Franciscan missionaries. Along with Mission San Juan Bautista, Mission San Bernardo, and the nearby San Juan Bautista presidio, it belonged to a complex collectively known as the San Juan Bautista Missions.

== History ==
The mission was officially founded on March 1, 1700, by Sargento mayor Diego Ramón, with Franciscan missionaries Antonio de Olivares and Francisco Hidalgo in attendance. It was originally located 5 miles (8.0 km) from the Rio Grande in Coahuila state, northeastern Mexico, in what is today the Municipality of Guerrero.

The Native American people brought into the mission belonged to various Coahuiltecan groups. The Terocodame and Xarame tribes were the most numerous; other groups present included the Jaram, Papanac, Payaguá, and Kumeyaay. Baptismal records show Payaya present by the year 1706. Later, members of the Xarame and Sijame tribes were present as well.

Letters from Olivares complain of ingratitude from the mission natives, and about the influence of the natives from outside the mission. In December, he reported that the natives had left the mission, due to food shortages and the danger from raids. Olivares traveled to Mexico City to ask Ramón for support, returning with a military company and two additional missionaries, Jorge de Puga and Alonso González.

At its peak, the mission housed more than 300 Native Americans, of whom about half were baptized. The natives attended catechesis every morning and evening, in addition to performing agricultural labor.

The area was unable to provide enough food for the three nearby missions, leading to ongoing shortages. As a result, the mission was relocated several times. In 1703, it was moved to present-day Zaragoza Municipality; in 1708, to Villa de San José; and in 1718, to San Antonio, where it later became known as the Alamo Mission.

== See also ==
- Solano language
