= Comecrudo language =

Extinct Comecrudan language of Mexico

Comecrudo
- Carrizo, Yué
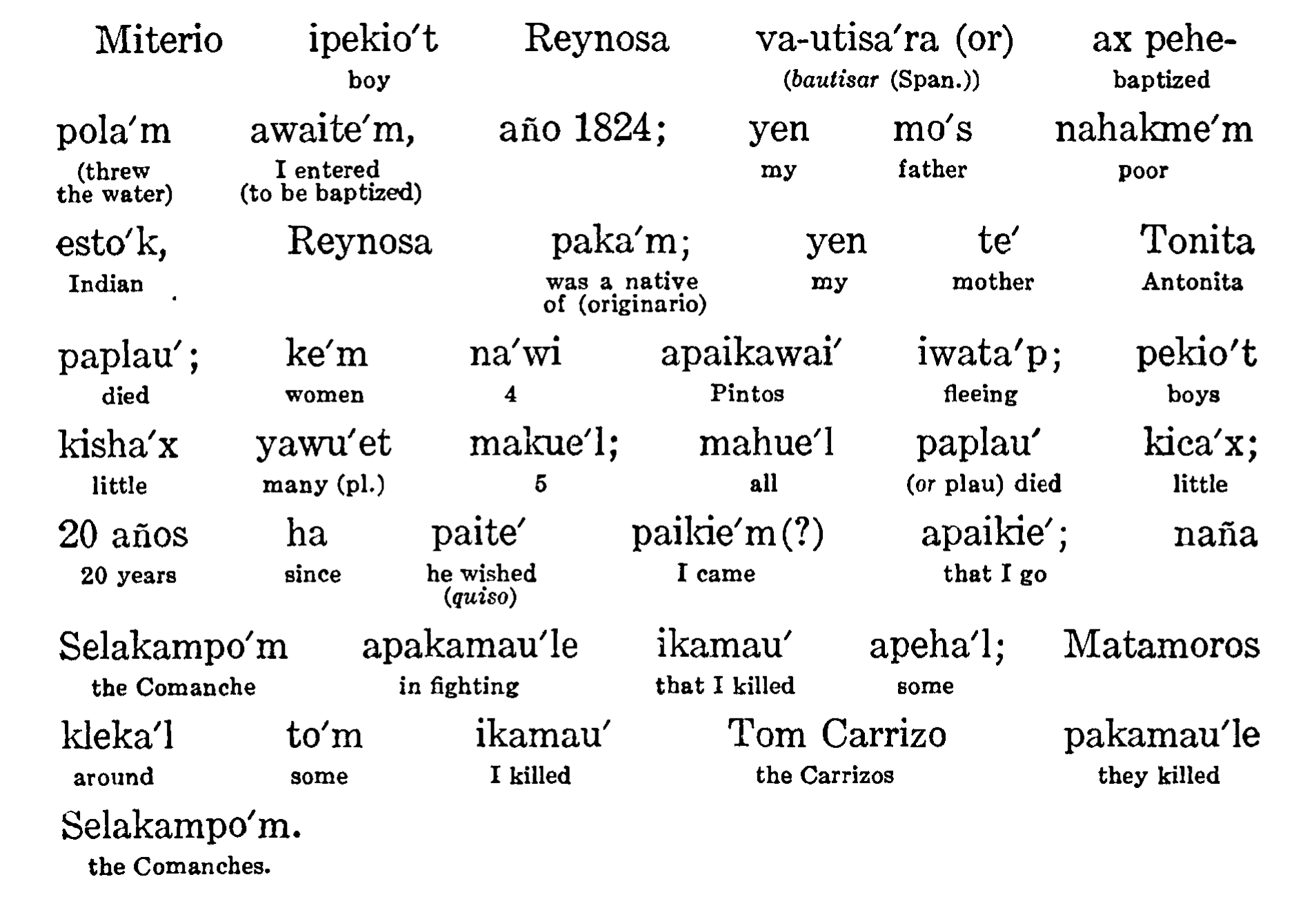
- A short tale in Carrizo
- Native to: Mexico
- Region: Rio Grande
- Ethnicity: Comecrudo people
- Extinct: late 19th century
- Language family: Hokan ?: Coahuiltecan ?; Pakawan ?; Comecrudan; Comecrudo

Language codes
- ISO 639-3: xcm
- Glottolog: come1253

Comecrudo, also Yué, is an extinct Comecrudan language of Mexico. The name Comecrudo is Spanish for "eat-raw". It was best recorded in a list of 148 words in 1829 by French botanist Jean Louis Berlandier (Berlandier called it "Mulato") (Berlandier et al. 1828–1829). It was spoken on the lower Rio Grande near Reynosa, Tamaulipas, in Mexico. Comecrudo has often been considered a Coahuiltecan language although most linguists now consider the relationship between them unprovable due to the lack of information.

Comecrudo tribal names were recorded in 1748 (Saldivar 1943):

- Sepinpacam
- Perpepug
- Atanaguaypacam / Atanaouajapaca (also known as Atanaguipacane)

In 1861, German Adolph Uhde published a travelogue with some vocabulary (Uhde called the language Carrizo, Spanish for "reed") (Uhde 1861: 185–186). In 1886, Albert Gatschet recorded vocabulary, sentences, and a short text from the descendants (who were not fluent) of the last Comecrudo speakers near Camargo, Tamaulipas, at Las Prietas (Swanton 1940: 55–118). The best of these consultants were Emiterio, Joaquin, and Andrade.

An automated computational analysis (ASJP 4) by Müller et al. (2013) found lexical similarities with Uto-Aztecan, likely due to borrowings.

== See also ==
- Comecrudo people
- Coahuiltecan
- Coahuiltecan people
