= Abtaf =

Village in Kermanshah, Iran

Abtaf ابطاف
- Village
- Location within Iran
- Coordinates: 34°00′39″N 47°20′26″E
- Country: Iran
- Province: Kermanshah
- County: Kermanshah
- Bakhsh: Firuzabad
- Rural District: Sar Firuzabad

Population (2006)
  - Total: 185
- Time zone: UTC+3:30 (IRST)
  - Summer (DST): UTC+4:30 (IRDT)

Abtaf (Persian: ابطاف, also Romanized as Ābţāf) is a village in Sar Firuzabad Rural District, Firuzabad District, Kermanshah County, Kermanshah Province, Iran. At the 2006 census, its population was 185, in 37 families.
