= Comecrudo people =

Indigenous people of Mexico

Comecrudo
Regions with significant populations
- Northern Tamaulipas (c. 19th century)

Languages
- Comecrudo language

Religion
- Indigenous

Related ethnic groups
- Coahuiltecan people

The Comecrudo people were an Indigenous people of Mexico and Texas, who lived in the northern state of Tamaulipas. They were a Coahuiltecan people.

== Territory ==
The Comecrudo lived in northern Tamaulipas in the 17th and 18th centuries. In the late 18th century, they lived on the southern bank of the Rio Grande, not far from Reynosa.

== Language ==
They spoke the Comecrudo language, one of the Pakawan languages. Swiss-American ethnologist Albert S. Gatschet worked with eight Comecrudo elders who remembered some of the language to record vocabulary words in 1886.

== Name ==
The name Comecrudo means "raw meat eaters" in Spanish. Spanish colonists also called them the Carrizo, meaning "reed." In 1886, they told Gaschet they preferred the name Comecrudo over Carrizo. The Tonkawa and Kiowa called them the "shoeless people."

== History ==
In 1886, about 30 to 35 Comecrudo lived near Charco Escondido in Tamaulipas. Their last elected chief, Marcelino, died in 1856.

The Kiowa took some Comecrudo captive.

== Heritage group ==
An organization in Floresville, Texas, claims descent from the Comecrudo and formed the Carrizo Comecrudo Nation of Texas Inc. As an unrecognized organization, they are neither a federally recognized tribe nor a state-recognized tribe.

Grist Magazine writes the organization has no documentation, and is instead based on the family lore of Juan Benito Mancias, the chairman. Native American scholar Kim Tallbear labels the organization's story of hiding possible ancestry as common in the American South, and says ancestry alone is not a claim to being Indigenous.
