= Unpuncliegut =

Extinct Indigenous tribe of Texas

Regions with significant populations
- coastal Texas, U.S.

Languages
- Coahuiltecan language

Religion
- Indigenous religion, Roman Catholicism

The Unpuncliegut, also known as the Hunzpunzliegut, were an Indigenous people who lived along the southern part of the Texas coast.

In the mid-18th century, they lived near Laguna Madre, an estuary to the Gulf Coast. The area is now part of Cameron and Willacy counties.

== Language ==
They are believed to have spoken a Coahuiltecan language.
