= Cotoname language =

Extinct language of North America

Cotoname
- Native to: Mexico, United States
- Region: lower Rio Grande
- Ethnicity: Cotoname
- Extinct: c. 1900
- Language family: Language isolate

Language codes
- ISO 639-3: xcn
- Glottolog: coto1248
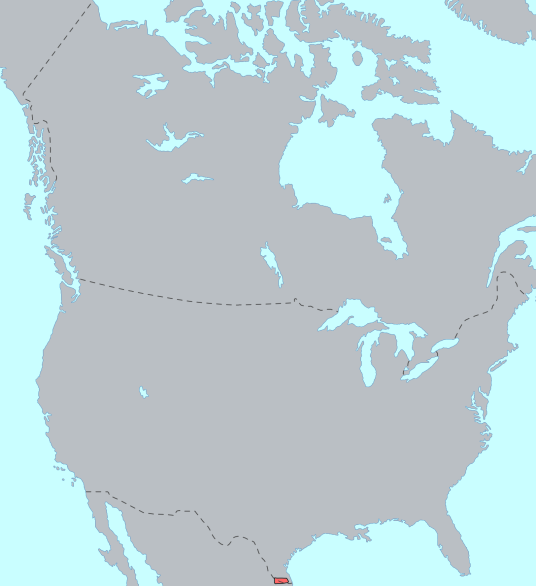
- Map indicating where Cotoname was spoken

Cotoname (Note: Or Cotonamu.) is an Indigenous language of Mexico and the American state of Texas formerly spoken by Native Americans indigenous to the lower Rio Grande Valley of northeastern Mexico and extreme southern Texas (United States). Today it is extinct, and is proposed to be a component of a Pakawan language family. Today, it is considered a language isolate.

All known primary witnesses to the Cotoname language were published in 2024.

== Vocabulary ==
The following vocabulary list of Cotoname is from John Swanton (1940).

gloss	Cotoname
air	gurám
arm, right	katówan
arrow	ká-u
bad	kĕnáx, sá
bed	kắm
belly	kóx, kuwéle
below	éta
bird	komióm
bison	wiyá-u
black	baí (cf. night)
blade	ĕhiá-u
blanket, American	häwáss (cf. cold)
blood	sä'x
blow, to	pó-une
bow	kémma
boy	kuwósam
breast (female)	kĕnám
breechclout	xaguátema
buffalo	wiyá-u
cactus-fig	wámena
cane	ká-u
chair, a	náxe
chief	kapitán
cloth (a small piece of cloth)	huáxhe
cold	häwéss
come here!	sánxe
Comecrudo	Aranguá, xaíma
cow	wiyá-u
crane	karakór
cry, to	páma
dance, to	okáwe
day	ō'
daybreak	káma
deer	kĕmás
die, to	wátĕxo
dog	kowá-u
drink, to	xuáxe
dust	pó-una
earth	pén
east	otá-ume
eat, to	haháme
evening	ovx
eye	arókwan
face	makuát
far	huánpa
feathers	kuwai
female	nan
fire	mánĕx
flesh	kĕmás
fog	máyen
food	haháme
foot	ayésim
fox	kissá
girl	kuwósam
go over there!	awóyo!
goat	kápĕra
good	kĕnáx
goose	krák
grass	suá-u
great	katám
gun	komióp
guts	kuwéle
hair	makuát
handkerchief	huáxhe
hare	gamáro
hat	garópa
head	makuát
high	katám
hog	esmók
horn	yómo
horse	kokátere
Indian, an	xaíma
infant	huwáxe
iron	komióp
Karankawa	Aranguá
kill, to	wátxuka
knife	komiópo
knife (for cutting leather)	ĕhiá-u
land	pén
let us go!	awóyo
little	kuwósam
low (said of water)	xuắxe
maize	tawaló
maize-husk	wapxáp
male quadruped	yómo
man	xuaináxe
masticate, to	akwanámie
meat	kemás
mesquite-bush	dán
metate	komoí
milk	kĕnám
mouse	tsĕmáx
mud	pén
night	baí
no	sá
north	hayámta
nose	yá-ĕx
ox (young)	wiyá-u
painted (on body, face, etc.)	tháwĕ
peccary	kápio
Pintos (Indian tribe so called)	tháwĕ
pipe	pá-una
rabbit	kiáxhem
rat	tsĕmáx
red	msá-ĕ
reed	ká-u
rifle	komióp
Rio Grande river	áx̣, katám
river	áx̣, katám
run, to	mtára
salt	dá-än
scratch, to	átsiu
seat, a	náxe
sheep	séwuya
sing, to	koyáma
sit, to	páwe
sit down!	páwe
sleep, to	mátsĕkuka
small	kuwósam
smoke, to	pá-una, suá-u
snake	kiá-uxa
sombrero	garópa
south	séta
stand, to	páwia
star	kápra
stick	dópax
suck, to	huä'xle
sun	ō'
sweet	yáx
sweetmeats	yáx
tail (of animal)	ásuxuga
Tampacuás Indian	xaíma
tobacco	suá-u
tortilla	kamaplaí
tortoise	gapáx
tree	dópax
tuna	wámĕna
up the country	wéfta
velduque	ĕhiá-u
west	wéfta
what do you want?	titcháx mén?
water	áx̣
weep, to	xákue
west	wéfta
white	mesó-i
wind	gurám
wings	miápa
within	kuwéle
wolf	kombóx
woman	katám

== See also ==
- Indigenous languages of the Americas
- Comecrudan languages
