= Quems people =

Extinct Native American tribe in Texas

Quems
Total population
- extinct

Regions with significant populations
- Texas, Coahuila

Languages
- Quems language

Religion
- traditional tribal religion

The Quems were an Indigenous people who lived along the Rio Grande in what is now the U.S. state of Texas and the Mexican state of Coahuila in the 17th and 18th centuries. They are known to have settled around present-day Eagle Pass and Piedras Negras. Damián Massanet also recorded them, in 1691, as one of six groups of Indians encountered along a stream called "Caramanchel"; this appears to correspond with today's Comanche Creek in the southwestern part of Zavala County. Massenet implied that all six groups spoke a language now known as Coahuilteco.

The Quems were among the most prominent Native Americans living between the Nueces River and the Rio Grande.

In 1689, Alonso De León was led by two Indian guides to the site of Fort St. Louis, built by Sieur de la Salle along Matagorda Bay. One of the guides was a Quems, who claimed that he had visited the fort while it was still occupied by the French. Massenet, in his account of this expedition, recorded that the Quems guide used a sign language then common in the area of southern Texas; he was also tattooed.

When the San Phelipe de Valladares Mission was founded near modern-day Candela in 1700, some Quems entered; they were recorded under the name Quexamos. Little else is known of the tribe, except that between 1726 and 1748 two families, constituting six people, were recorded as being in the San Antonio de Valero Mission of San Antonio.

Spanish chronicallers also spelled their name Cems, Qems, Quimzo, and Quinze.
