= Coahuiltecan languages =

Obsolete language family

Coahuiltecan
- (Controversial)
- Geographic distribution: Texas, northern Mexico
- Ethnicity: Coahuiltecan peoples
- Extinct: by 1900s
- Linguistic classification: related to Hokan?
- Subdivisions: Comecrudo; Cotoname; Aranama; Solano; Mamulique; Garza; Coahuilteco

Language codes
- Glottolog: None
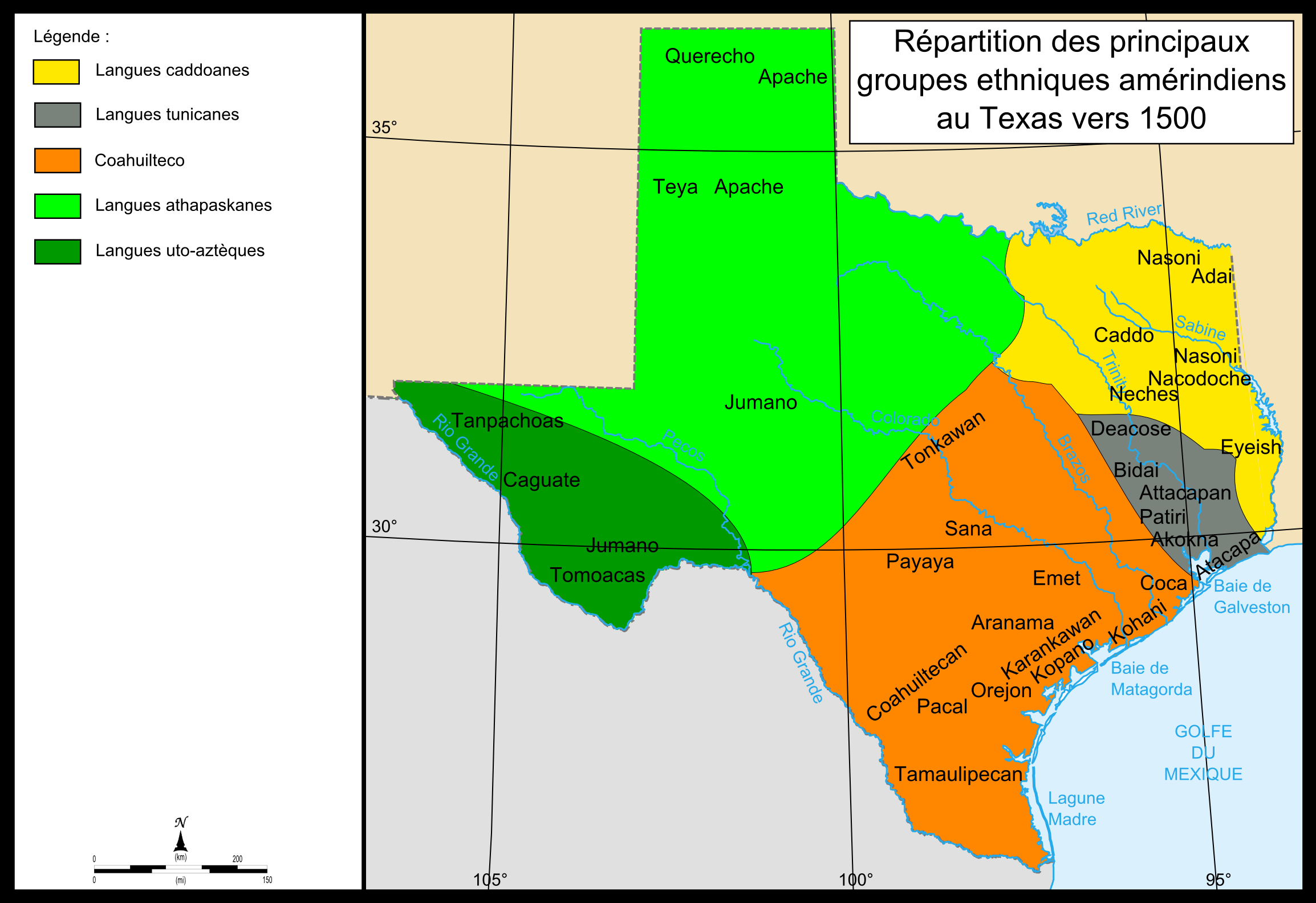
- The range of Indians of Coahuiltecan culture in Texas, although most authorities would not include the Karankawa and Tonkawa as Coahuiltecan

Coahuiltecan was a proposed language family in John Wesley Powell's 1891 classification of Native American languages. Most linguists now reject the view that the Coahuiltecan peoples of southern Texas and adjacent Mexico spoke a single or related languages. Coahuiltecan continues to be a convenient collective term for the languages and people of this region.

== Language relationships ==
Similarities among the cultures among the indigenous people and the physical setting of south Texas led linguists to believe that the languages of the region were also similar. The Coahuiltecan language family was proposed to include all the languages of the region, including Karankawa and Tonkawa. Linguistic connections were proposed with Hokan, a language family of several Native American peoples living in California, Arizona, and Baja California.

Most modern linguists, by contrast, see the Coahuiltecan region as one of linguistic diversity. A few words are known from seven different languages: Amotomanco, Aranama, Cotoname, Comecrudo, Cotoname, Aranama, Solano, Mamulique, Garza, and Coahuilteco or Pakawa. Coahuilteco or Pakawa seems to have been a lingua franca of Texas Coahuiltecans living at or near the Catholic Missions established at San Antonio in the 18th century. Almost certainly, many more languages were spoken, but numerous Coahuiltecan bands and ethnic groups became extinct between the 16th and 19th century and their languages were unrecorded. In 1886, ethnologist Albert Gatschet found perhaps the last surviving speakers of Coahuiltecan languages: 25 Comecrudo, 1 Cotoname, and 2 Pakawa. They were living near Reynosa, Mexico. In 1690, the population of Indians in northeastern Mexico and southern Texas may have been 100,000. The Coahuiltecans were sold into slavery, died of introduced European diseases, and were absorbed by the surrounding Hispanic population.

Linguists have postulated a Comecrudan language family with Comecrudo, Mamulique, and Garza as related and Coahuilteco and Cotoname possibly related. Comecrudo and Cotoname are the best known of the languages. They were spoken in the delta of the Rio Grande. Not enough information exists to classify Solano and Aranama. However, linguistic conservatives say that all these languages should be considered language isolates, with insufficient data to establish relationships between and among the languages.

The Coahuiltecan languages and cultures are now extinct. The names of many bands have been preserved, including the Ervipiame, Mayeye, Pajalat, Quems, Quepano, Solano, and Xarames.

Colonial era religious text is Coahuiltecan and Spanish from the first half of the 18th century.

== Bibliography ==
- Mithun, Marianne. (1999). The languages of Native North America. Cambridge: Cambridge University Press. ISBN 0-521-23228-7 (hbk); ISBN 0-521-29875-X.
