= Pajalat =

Historic Native American tribe from Texas

- Manuscript about the language of the Pajalats in this language and Spanish by Fray Gabriel de Vergara dated 1732

Total population
- extinct as a tribe

Regions with significant populations
- Texas

Languages
- a Coahuiltecan language

Related ethnic groups
- other Coahuiltecan peoples

The Pajalat were a Native American group who lived in the area just south of San Antonio, Texas, prior to the arrival of the Spanish to the region in the 18th century.

== Language ==
The Pajalat spoke a dialect of the Coahuiltecan language. They spoke the same language as the Tiplacopal and Patumaco peoples.

== Territory ==
At the time of European and African contact, the Pajalat lived between the Frio River and the San Antonio River. The Tiplacopal people shared their territory. A 1727 Spanish map shows the Pajalat and Siquipil lived in what is now Goliad County, Texas.

== 18th-century history ==
When Spaniards settled San Antonio, Pajalats moved there and to the Nuestra Señora de la Purísima Concepción de Acuña and San Francisco de la Espada Missions when they were founded in 1731. At Mission Concepción members of the tribe alternated holding gobernador and alcalde offices with Tacame people. Historians have found records of 23 to 82 Pajalats living at Mission Concepción.

By 1791, some Pajalat joined the Nuestra Señora del Refugio Mission in present-day Refugio, Texas.

== Name ==
The Pajalat were also called the Cajalate, Pajal, Pajalac, Pajalache, Pajalatam, Pallalat, Paxolot, and many other variations.

They are not to be confused with the distinct Pachalaque people.
