= Xarames =

Historic Indigenous tribe of Mexico and U.S. (Texas)

Xarame
Regions with significant populations
- southern Texas, U.S.; Nuevo León, Mexico

Languages
- Coahuiltecan languages

Religion
- Indigenous religion, Roman Catholicism

The Xarames were an Indigenous people of the Americas of the San Antonio, Texas region. They were the dominant Native American group during the early history of Mission San Antonio de Valero (commonly known as "The Alamo"). They were a Coahuiltecan people.

They are distinct from the Xaraname who lived near the Texas coast.

== Name ==
The name Xarame has also been written as Charame, Chaulama, Jarame, Shiarame, and Zarame.

== History ==
They Xarame likely originated in the Edwards Plateau between the Nueces River and the Frio River. In 1699, Spanish colonists established the San Juan Bautista Mission in Coahuila to convert Xarame and three other Coahuiltecan bands. After the Spanish established another mission near present-day Eagle Pass, Texas, some Xarame moved there. Others moved to the San Francisco Solano Mission founded in 1700 in Coahuila, Mexico.

The San Antonio de Valero mission mentioned the Xarame as late as 1776.
