= Karankawa language =

Extinct language of Texas

Karankawa
- Keles
- Native to: United States
- Region: Texas coast, from Galveston Island to Corpus Christi
- Ethnicity: Karankawa people
- Extinct: c. 1880
- Language family: unclassified

Language codes
- ISO 639-3: zkk
- Glottolog: kara1289
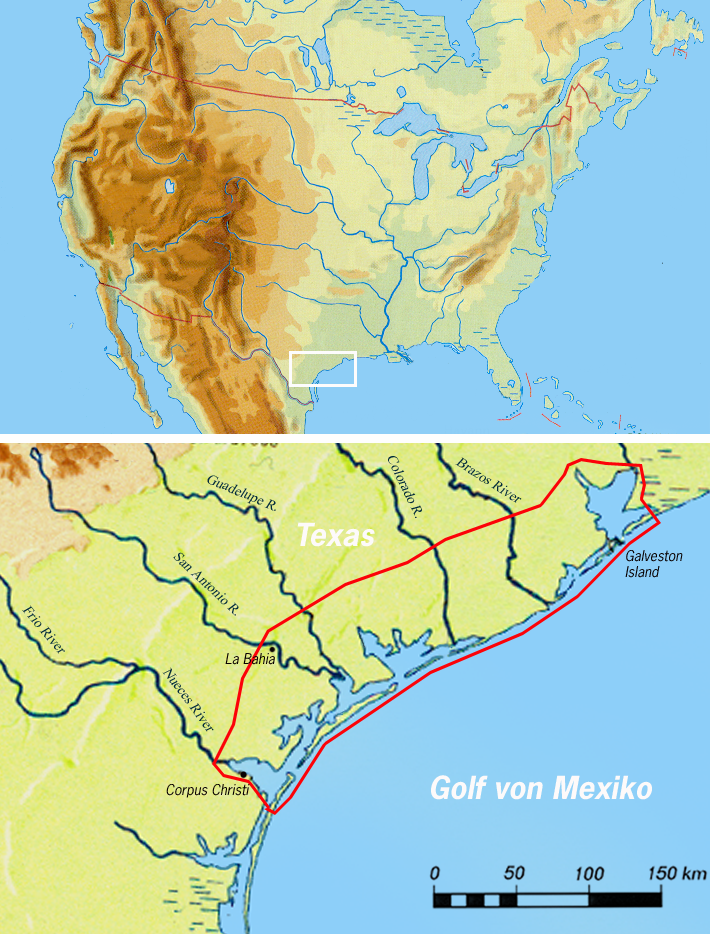
- Pre-contact distribution of the Karankawa language

Karankawa (/kəˈræŋkəwə/ kə-RANK-ə-wə) is the extinct, unclassified language of the Texas coast, where the Karankawa people migrated between the mainland and the barrier islands. It was not closely related to other known languages in the area, many of which are also poorly attested, and may have been a language isolate. A couple hundred words are preserved, collected in 1698, 1720, and 1828; in the 1880s, three lists were collected from non-Karankawa who knew some words.

Karankawa has sometimes been included with neighboring languages in a Coahuiltecan family, but that is now thought to be spurious.

== Phonology ==
Consonant sounds
		Bilabial	Alveolar	Palatal	Velar		Glottal
		Bilabial	Alveolar	Palatal	plain	lab.	Glottal
Plosive	voiceless	p	t		k	kʷ	ʔ
Plosive	voiced	b	d		ɡ		
Nasal		m	n				
Affricate			ts	tʃ			
Fricative			s	ʃ	x		h
Approximant		w	l	j			

There were also possible lateral affricate sounds [tɬ, dɮ] which were represented as ⟨kl, gl⟩.

Vowel sounds
	Front	Central	Back
Close	i iː		u uː
Mid	e eː	ə	o oː
Open		a aː	

== Vocabulary ==
Though only a few hundred words of the Karankawa language are preserved, the following are selected words recorded by Albert Gatschet, a Swiss-American anthropologist and linguist, referenced from the last fluent speakers of the language.

- Nāt’sa "one", counted on the right pinky
- Haikia "two" or "second", counted on the right ring finger
- Kaxayi "three", counted on the right middle finger
- Hayo hak(ě)n "four", or "fourth", counted on the right index finger
- Do-aḍ "Four", or "fourth", literally "deer", counted on the right index finger
- Nāt’sa Behema, "five" or "fifth", literally "First Father", counted on the right thumb
- Hayo Haikia, "Six" or "Sixth", literally "Three two", counted on the left pinky
- Haikia Nāt’sa, "Seven" or "Seventh", literally "Second one", counted on left ring finger
- Haikia Behema, "Eight" or "Eighth", literally "Second father", counted on left middle finger
- Haikia Do-aḍ, "Nine" or "Ninth", literally "Second deer", counted on the left index finger
- (Do-aḍ) Habe "Ten" or "Tenth", literally "Ten(th deer)", counted on the left thumb
- Kaup(ě)n "Speak"
- Yamawe "Man"
- Glo-essen/Glos(ě)n "Boy"
- Kaninma "Woman" or "Mother"
- Ka'da "Girl"
- Glle-i "Water"
- Ahayika "Friend"
- Dōwal "Sun"
- Kiss "Dog"
- Peka "White"
- Pal/Ma "Black"
- Aknamus "Eat"
- Tcha "See"
- Ye "Go" or "Walk"

=== Swanton (1940) ===
The following vocabulary list of Karankawa is from John Swanton (1940).

gloss	Karankawa
about to	tcápn
acorn	kalac
adze	kusila
affectionate	mutá
after a while	messús
all the time	mucawáta
alligator	hókso
also	ténno
always	mucawáta
and	ténno
angry, to be very	napé-nai naxerúaxa pára
arm (forearm)	se-cotan
arm (upper)	se-imahaha
arrow	demo
ashes	ahona
at present	messús
ax	kialn
babe	kwā́n
bad	tcúta
ball for musket	kecila-demuks
barrel	búdel
basin	koje ön
beads	kujahin
beans	kudec
bear	ǒ's
beef	didot, tíkĕmai
behold, to	tcá
belly	a-luk
big	kunin
bird	kúdn
bird, a common	tekotsen
biscuit	kuejam
bison	didot
black	ma, pál
blue	tsō'l
board	kuaham
boat	awán, elucun
bow, a	gái, kruin
bowl	kok
boy	kolohs, níktam
bread	kwiáṃ
bread, fresh	kokam
break, to	táhama
breast	kanín
brush	tesselénia
bucket of tin	koláme
build (a fire), to	kosáta
building	bá-ak, kaham
bull	didot
by and by	messús
cabin	bá-ak, kaham
calf	koco
calico	kádla
calumet	kadiol
camp	bá-ak, kaham
can	tá
cannon	etjam
canoe	awā́n, elucun, uahahim
capture, to	haítn
cask	kaa-konam
cat	gáta
catch, to	haítn
cattle	didot
cherish, to	ka
chicken	kúdn, wólya
chief	hálba
child	kwā́n
chin	em-imian hanéna
cigarette	káhe, swénas
circular	lá-akum
cloth	kwíss
clothing	a-lams
cold	delin
come!	éwē
come, to	gás
come here! éwē	gás, wána
come quick!	éwē
converse, to	kaúpn
cord	bacina
com	kwiáṃ
cow, a	nen, didot
cowhorn	teke-dolan
crane	kĕdō'd, koln
curlew	kwojol
dangerous	tcúta
dart	kusila
day	bákta
dead	mál
dear	mutá
deer	dóatn, tekomandotsen
deerskin	kesul
desire, to	tá
disk-shaped	lá-akum
do, to	kosáta
dog	kec
don't cry!	ăhămmic
dress	kádla, kwíss
drink, to	kouaen
duck	kue, medá-u
dugout	awā́n
eagle	balsehe
eat, to	aknámas
egg	dáhome
eight	haíkia
exhausted	kwá-al
eye	em-ikus
eyebrows	im-lahue
fabric	kwíss
fall, to	amóak
far off	nyá wól
farewell!	atcáta
father	béhema
feathers	hamdolok
female	nen
fine	plá
finger	étsma
fire	húmhe, kwátci, kwoilesem
fire-pot	koko
fire-sticks	akta demaje
fish	áṃ, kiles
fish-hook	kusila
five	nā́tsa
flagon	kedika
flour	ámhătn
fly, a	kamej
foot	eham, kékeya
four	hayo
French, the	kalbasska
friend	aháyika
get away!	ăhắmmic
gimlet	klani
girl	kā́da
give, to	báwûs
glass	kusila
glassware	kujahin
globiform	lá-akum
go, to	gás, yé
go away!	wána
going to	tcápn
gone	budáma
good	kuìst-baha, plá
good bye!	atcáta
goose	lá-ak
gown	kádla, kwíss
grass	awátcxol
great	yá-an
grindstone	hama
grow, to	kwā́n
gun	kisulp
gunpowder	kalmel
hair	ekia aikui
hand	étsma
handsome	hamála
harpoon	kusila
hasten, to	kóta, xankéye
hat	kalama
hatchet	matcíta
hate, to	matákia
he	tál
head	en-okea
healthy	klabán
heart	láhama
hen	kúdn, wólya
hog	tapcewá
horn of cow	teke-dolan
horse	kanueüm, kuwáyi
house	bá-ak, kaham
hungry	ámel
hurry, to	kóta, xankéye
hurt, to	kassítcuwakn
hush	ăhắmmic
hut	bá-ak, kaham
I	náyi
injure, to	kassítcuwakn
it	tál
jug	kahan
jump, to	éṃ
kettle	kukujol
kill, to	ahúk
kitten	gáta
knee	en-klas
knife	bekekomb, kusila, silekáyi
know, to	kúmna, kwáss
large	yá-an
lark	kutsen
laugh, to	kaíta
leg	em-anpok
let us go!	wána
lie down, to	wú-ak
little	kwā́n, níktam
lodge	bá-ak, kaham
long	wól
long ago	upāt
love, to	ka
maize	kwiáṃ
make, to	káhawan, kosáta
man	ahaks, tecoyu, úci, yámawe
manufacture, to	káhawan
marry, to	mawída
mast	kesul
mat	didaham
me	náyi
metal	kusila
milk	tesnakwáya
mine	náyi
molasses	téskaus
moon	a-uil
mosquito	gắ
mother	kanín
mouth	emi-akwoi
much	wól
music	yŏ'ta
musket-ball	kecila-demuks
my	náyi
neck	em-sebek
needle	aguíya, besehena
nice	plá
nine	haíkia
no!	kóṃ
nose	em-ai aluak
not	kóṃ
now	acáhak
oak-apple	ēkskitula
obnoxious	tcúta
octopus	áṃ
one	nā́tsa
oyster	dắ
paddle	em-luajem
pail	kok
pain, to cause	kassítcuwakn
pan, frying-	koláme
paper	imetes akuam
past	budáma
peas	kudec
pelican	ōkman
perform, to	kosáta
pickax	kialn
pig	kalbasska, madóna
pimento	kesesmai
pin	besehena
pinnacle	kesesmai
pipe	kadiol
pistol	ka ai kuan
plaice	ampaj
plate made of tin	kesila-konan
plenty of	wól
plover	sebe
potato	yám
pound, to	kássig
powerful	wól
prairie chicken	kúdn, wólya
presently	acáhak
pretty	hamála
produce, to	káhawan
push, to	dán
quick, to come	xankéye
rain	wí-asn
read, to	gwá
red	tamóyika
return, to	gás
round	lá-akum
run, to	xankéye, tólos
saber	teheye
sail	a-lams
salt	dem, ketac
sand	kohon
satisfaction, expression of	baa
say, to	kaúpn
scat!	ăhămmic
see, to	tcá
serpent	aúd
seven	haíkia, nā́tsa
sew, to	teksilea
sexual organs, male	em-ibak
she	tál
ship	awā́n, elucun
shirt	gusgáma
shoe	kameplan
shoot, to	ódn
shoulder	em-sehota
sick	a-eas, kwátco
side to side, to pass from	lon
sit, to	háka
sit down!	háka
six	haíkia, háyo
skin of deer	kesul
skip, to	éṃ
sleep, to	ĭṃ, neianana
small	kwā́n
smoke	ánawan
snake	aúd
soon	messús
Spaniards	kahamkeami
speak, to	gaxiamétĕt, kaúpn
stag	tekomandotsen
stand, to	yétso
stomach	a-luk
strike, to	gá-an
strong	wól
suck, to	énno
sugar	téskaus
sun	klos, dóowal
sweet	téskaus
swim, to	nótawa
talk, to	kaúpn
tall	yá-an
tar	kuja
tattooings	bacenana
tear, to	táhama
teat	kanín
tell, to	kaúpn
ten	hábe
textile	kwíss
that	tál
there	nyá
thigh	em-edal
thine	áwa
this	tál
thou	áwa
three	kaxáyi
thy	áwa
tired	kwá-al
tobacco	a-kanan, káhe, dé
tongue	a-lean
Tonkawa Indian	Tcankáya
too	ténno
tooth	dolonakin, é
tooth-brush	tesselénia
touch, to	tcaútawal
tree	akwiní
turtle, a large green	haítnlokn
two	haíkia
understand, to	kúmna
useful	plá
vermilion	kadüm
vessel	awā́n, elucun
walk, to	shak, yé
wall	kesul
want, to	tá
water	klai, komkom
water-hen	uapa
weep, to	owíya
well	klabán
where?	mudá
whiskey	labá-i
whistle, to	áksōl
white	péka
wicked	tcúta
wide	yá-an
will	tcápn
wind	bá, eta
wine	klebö
wish, to	tá
wolf	kec
woman, a	acade
wood	kesul
work, to	takína
yes	ihié-ă
yesterday	tuwámka
yonder	nyá
you	áwa
young of an animal	kwā́n
youngster	níktam
