= Hokan languages =

Proposed language family in North America

Hokan
- (controversial)
- Geographic distribution: North America
- Linguistic classification: Proposed language family
- Subdivisions: Karuk; Shasta-Palaihnihan †; Ch’imáriko †; Yana †; Washo; Esselen †; Salinan †; Pomoan; Yuman; Seri; Coahuiltecan †; Tequistlatecan; Jicaquean (Tolan)

Language codes
- ISO 639-5: hok
- Glottolog: None
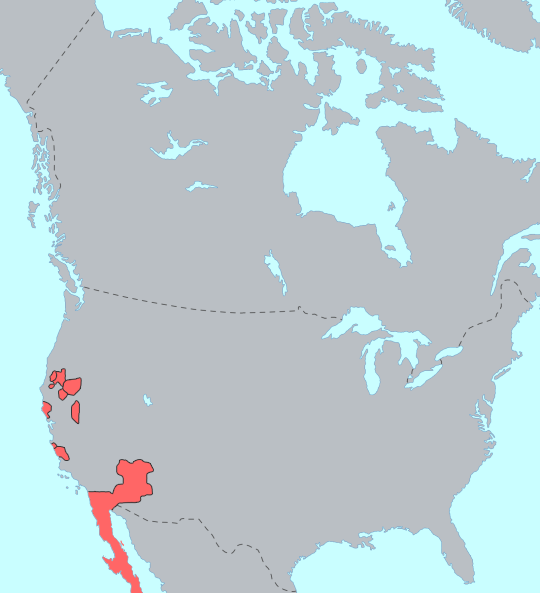
- Hokan families of California, Arizona and Baja California

The Hokan /ˈhoʊkæn/ language family is a hypothetical grouping of a dozen small language families spoken mainly in California, Arizona, and Baja California. Some versions of the hypothesis also include languages spoken in Oaxaca and Honduras.

== Etymology ==
The name Hokan is loosely based on the word for "two" in the various Hokan languages: *xwak in Proto-Yuman, c-oocj (pronounced [koːkx]) in Seri, ha'k in Achumawi, etc. Compare similar construction of the term "Penutian".

== History of the proposal ==
The "Hokan hypothesis" was first proposed in 1913 by Roland B. Dixon and Alfred L. Kroeber, and further elaborated by Edward Sapir. Initial follow-up research found little additional evidence that these language families were related to each other. But since about 1950, increased efforts to document Hokan languages and to establish sound correspondences in proposed lexical resemblance sets have added weight to the Hokan hypothesis, leading to its acceptance by many specialists in the languages of California, Oregon, and Mesoamerica. However, some skepticism remains among scholars.

Linguist Paul Rivet claimed the Yurumanguí language of Colombia was part of the Hokan family. This claim has not been accepted by historical linguists. Terrence Kaufman wondered if Hokan might be related to Oto-Mangean of Central America.

An automated computational analysis (ASJP 4) by Müller et al. (2013) found lexical similarities among Seri, Yuman and Tequistlatecan. However, since the analysis was automatically generated, the grouping could be either due to mutual lexical borrowing or genetic inheritance.

== Distribution ==
The geographic distribution of the Hokan languages suggests that they became separated around the Central Valley of California by the influx of later-arriving Penutian and other peoples; archaeological evidence for this is summarized in Chase-Dunn & Mann (1998). These languages are spoken by Native American communities around and east of Mount Shasta, others near Lake Tahoe, the Pomo on the California coast, and the Yuman peoples along the lower Colorado River. Some linguists also include Chumash, between San Luis Obispo and Los Angeles, and other families, but the evidence is insubstantial, and most now restrict Hokan to some or all of the languages listed below.

Linguists have suggested that Coahuilteco and Comecrudan spoken in southern Texas and northern Mexico belong to the Hokan language family. These languages are extinct and confirmation of the relationship is lacking.

== Languages ==
The Hokan languages retained by Kaufman (1988) due to regular sound correspondences and common core vocabulary are as follows. (The data on which these conclusions were drawn have not been published or evaluated by anyone else.) Apart from Shasta–Palaihnihan and Yuman, all branches are single languages or shallow families.

- Hokan
  - Chimariko
  - Yana/Yahi
  - Karuk
  - Shasta–Palaihnihan
    - Shastan (4)
    - Palaihnihan (2)
  - Pomoan (7)
  - Washo
  - Esselen
  - Salinan
  - Yuman (12)
  - Seri
  - Coahuilteco
  - Comecrudan (3)
  - Tequistlatecan (3)
  - Jicaquean/Tolan (2)

Marlett (2008) reevaluated the evidence and concluded that the evidence for Seri and Salinan has not been systematically or convincingly presented. The inclusion of the Tequistlatecan languages has also not received much support.

=== Zhivlov (2013) ===
A lexicostatistical classification of the Hokan languages by Zhivlov (2013) is roughly presented as follows.

- Hokan
  - Northern
      - Chimariko
        - Karuk
          - Shasta
            - Achumawi
            - Atsugewi
  - Southern
      - Yana
        - Seri
          - Highland Chontal
          - Yuman
      - Salinan
      - Pomoan

Zhivlov (2013) does not consider Jicaquean (Tol) and Washo to be Hokan languages.

== Vocabulary ==
Some Hokan lexical correspondences from Mary R. Haas (1963) are provided below.

| GLOSS | PROTO- SHASTA | PROTO- PALAIHNIHAN | PROTO- POMO | Yana | Karok | Chimariko | PROTO- YUMA | PROTO- HOKAN |
|---|---|---|---|---|---|---|---|---|
| 'ear' | *ísamakʼ | *ísamaK | *išamál | malʔgu | | -sam | *išamárika *išamákari | *išamarukʼa *išamákʼaru |
| 'liver' | *č-ímapasi | *iwapasi | | ima | váfiš | -ši | *imačipasí | *č-imapasi *imačipasi |
| 'navel' | *ímaraw | alu (Achomawi) | | lakʼi | ʔárup | -napu | *imalik^{w}í *imak^{w}áli | *imarakʼ^{w}i *imakʼ^{w}ari |
| 'neck (nape)' | *ímapka | *iwapaKi | | | vúˑp | -kki | *amipúki | *imapaki *amipaki |
| 'nose' | *č-imari | *yaw̃ari *iw̃ari | *ilaw̃a | | | | | *yamari *imari *irama |
| 'tongue' | ipwá (Okwanuchu) | *ipali __ | *ipál __ | bawal- | ápri- | -pen | *ipáli | *ipari *ipawari *ipariwa |

Similar forms for 'tongue' include:

- Chumash elʔew, elew < *ipariwa
- Washo alŋ < *ipariwa
- Salinan épal, ipaL < *ipari
- Seri apɬ < *ipari
- Chontal pala, peɬ- < *ipari

=== Similarities with Uto-Aztecan ===
Shaul (2019) notes the following similarities between Proto-Hokan (based on Kaufman 2015) and Proto-Uto-Aztecan.

| Gloss (for Proto-Hokan) | Proto-Hokan | Proto-Uto-Aztecan |
|---|---|---|
| louse/flea | #ači | *atë(N) ‘louse/nit’ |
| paternal grandfather | #apu | *apu ‘father/parent/mother’ |
| objective case | #-i | *i ‘objective case’ |
| come | #iyu, #iya | *ya- ‘come’ |
| wife | #luwa, #lowa | *lowa ‘vagina’ |
| hand | #man, #ma | *man ~ *ma ‘hand’ |
| give | #ma ~ #mo | *maka ‘give’ |
| woman | #mari | maːla ‘mother’ (Yoemian) |
| know (through magic) | #mata ~ #matu ~ #mati | *mata ~ *mati ‘know’ |
| be a woman | #momo- | momo- ‘woman’ (Hopi) |
| (not quite) dead | #mu- | *mukːV ‘die (singular)’ |
| young woman | #mus- | *muts [~ *mos] ‘vagina’ |
| child | #ŋam | -ŋyam ‘clan’ (Hopi) |
| pitch/sap | #sala | *saLa ‘pitch’ |

== See also ==
- Chumashan languages
- Penutian languages

== Sources ==
- Bright, William (1956). "Glottochronologic counts of Hokaltecan materials". Language. 32 (1): 42–48. doi:10.2307/410651. JSTOR 410651.
- Campbell, Lyle (1997). American Indian languages: the historical linguistics of Native America. Oxford: Oxford University Press.
- Chase-Dunn, Christopher; Kelly M. Mann (1998). The Wintu and Their Neighbors: A Small World-System in Northern California. Tucson: University of Arizona Press. ISBN 9780816518005.
- Golla, Victor. (2011). California Indian Languages. Berkeley: University of California Press. ISBN 978-0-5202-6667-4.
- Kaufman, Terrence. 1988. "A Research Program for Reconstructing Proto-Hokan: First Gropings." In Scott DeLancey, ed. Papers from the 1988 Hokan–Penutian Languages Workshop, pp. 50–168. Eugene, Oregon: Department of Linguistics, University of Oregon. (University of Oregon Papers in Linguistics. Publications of the Center for Amerindian Linguistics and Ethnography 1.)
- Kaufman, Terrence. 2015a. A research program for reconstructing proto-Hokan: first gropings. Project for the Documentation of the Languages of Mesoamerica.
- Kaufman, Terrence. 2015b. Some hypotheses regarding proto-Hokan grammar. Project for the Documentation of the Languages of Mesoamerica.
- Marlett, Stephen A. 2007. Las relaciones entre las lenguas “hokanas” en México: ¿Cuál es la evidencia?. In Cristina Buenrostro & others (eds.), Memorias del III Coloquio Internacional de Lingüística Mauricio Swadesh, 165–192. Mexico City: Universidad Nacional Autónoma de México & Instituto Nacional de Lenguas Indígenas.
- Marlett, Stephen A (2008). The Seri and Salinan connection revisited. International Journal of American Linguistics 74.3: 393–99.
- Rivet, Paul (1942). "Un dialecte Hoka Colombien: le Yurumangí". Journal de la Société des Américanistes de Paris. 34: 1–59. doi:10.3406/jsa.1942.2334.
