= Coahuilteco language =

Extinct language of Texas and Mexico

Coahuilteco
- Pajalate
- Manuscript of the Pajalate (Coahuilteco) language
- Native to: Mexico, United States
- Region: Coahuila, Texas
- Ethnicity: Quems, Pajalat, etc.
- Extinct: 18th century
- Language family: Language isolate
- Dialects: Pajalat

Language codes
- ISO 639-3: xcw
- Glottolog: coah1252
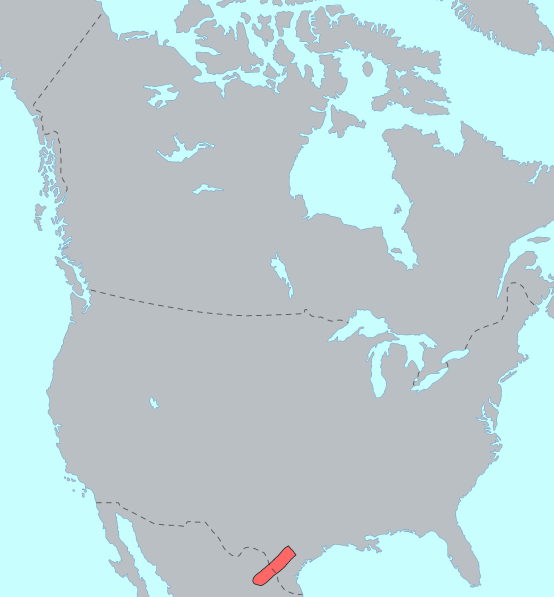
- Coauhuilteco language

Coahuilteco was one of the Indigenous languages that was spoken in southern Texas (United States) and northeastern Coahuila (Mexico). It is now extinct, and is typically considered to be a language isolate, but has also been proposed to be part of a Pakawan family.

== Classification ==
Coahuilteco was grouped in an eponymous Coahuiltecan family by John Wesley Powell in 1891, later expanded by additional proposed members by e.g. Edward Sapir. Ives Goddard later treated all these connections with suspicion, leaving Coahuilteco as a language isolate. Manaster Ramer (1996) argues Powell's original more narrow Coahuiltecan grouping is sound, renaming it Pakawan in distinction from the later more expanded proposal. This proposal has been challenged by Campbell, who considers its sound correspondences unsupported and considers that some of the observed similarities between words may be due to borrowing. It is now considered a language isolate.

== Phonology ==
=== Consonants ===
		Bilabial	Inter- dental	Alveolar		Palatal	Velar		Glottal
		Bilabial	Inter- dental	Alveolar		Palatal	plain	labial	Glottal
Nasal		m		n					
Plosive/ Affricate	plain	p		t	ts	tʃ	k	kʷ	(ʔ)
Plosive/ Affricate	ejective	pʼ		tʼ	tsʼ	tʃʼ	kʼ	kʷʼ	(ʔ)
Fricative			(θ)	s		ʃ	x	xʷ	h
Approximant	plain			l		j		w	
Approximant	ejective			lʼ					

=== Vowels ===
	Front	Central	Back
Close	i / iː		u / uː
Mid	e / eː		o / oː
Open		a / aː	

Coahuilteco has both short and long vowels.

== Syntax ==
Based primarily on study of one 88-page document, Fray Bartolomé García's 1760 Manual para administrar los santos sacramentos de penitencia, eucharistia, extrema-uncion, y matrimonio: dar gracias despues de comulgar, y ayudar a bien morir, Troike describes two of Coahuilteco's less common syntactic traits: subject-object concord and center-embedding relative clauses.

=== Subject-Object concord ===
In each of these sentences, the object Dios 'God' is the same, but the subject is different, and as a result different suffixes (-n for first person, -m for second person, and -t for third person) must be present after the demonstrative tupo· (Troike 1981:663).

Dios tupo·-n naxo-xt'e·wal wako·
God DEM-1CON 1pS-annoy CAUS
'We annoyed God'

Dios tupo·-m xa-ka·wa xo e?
God DEM-2CON 2S-love AUX Q
'Do you love God?'

Dios tupo·-t a-pa-k'tace·y
God DEM-3CON 3S-SUB-pray(PL)
'that (all) pray to God'

=== Center-embedding Relative Clauses ===
Troike (2015:135) notes that relative clauses in Coahuilteco can appear between the noun and its demonstrative (NP → N (Srel) Dem), leading to a center-embedding structure quite distinct from the right-branching or left-branching structures more commonly seen in the world's languages.

One example of such a center-embedded relative clause is the following:

saxpame· pinapsa·_{i} [xami·n e_{i-Obj} xa-p-xo·] tupa·-n
sins you (OBJ) {} 2-sub-know DEM-1C
‘the sins (which) you know’

The Coahuilteco text studied by Troike also has examples of two levels of embedding of relative clauses, as in the following example (Troike 2015:138):

pi·lam apšap’a·kan_{i} [e_{i-SUBJ} pi·nwakta·_{j} [Dios (∅) pil’ta·_{j} a-pa-ta·nko] tuče·-t a-p-awa·y] tupa·-t
people good.PL {} things God (DEM) pronj 3-sub-command DEM-3C 3-sub-do.PL DEM-3C
‘(He will carry to heaven) the good people [who do the things [that God commands]]’.

== See also ==
- Coahuiltecan languages
- Coahuiltecan people

== Bibliography ==
- Goddard, Ives (Ed.). (1996). Languages. Handbook of North American Indians (W. C. Sturtevant, General Ed.) (Vol. 17). Washington, D. C.: Smithsonian Institution. ISBN 0-16-048774-9.
- Mithun, Marianne. (1999). The languages of Native North America. Cambridge: Cambridge University Press. ISBN 0-521-23228-7 (hbk); ISBN 0-521-29875-X.
- Sturtevant, William C. (Ed.). (1978–present). Handbook of North American Indians (Vol. 1–20). Washington, D. C.: Smithsonian Institution. (Vols. 1–3, 16, 18–20 not yet published).
- Troike, Rudolph. (1996). Coahuilteco (Pajalate). In I. Goddard (Ed.), Languages (pp. 644–665). Handbook of North American Indians. Washington, D. C.: Smithsonian Institution.
