= Aridoamerica =

Ecological region of North America

Aridoamerica region of North America

Aridoamerica is a cultural and ecological region spanning Northern Mexico and the Southwestern United States, defined by the presence of the drought-resistant, culturally significant staple food, the tepary bean (Phaseolus acutifolius). Its dry, arid climate and geography stand in contrast to the verdant Mesoamerica of present-day central Mexico into Central America to the south and east, and the higher, milder "island" of Oasisamerica to the north. Aridoamerica overlaps with both.

Because of the relatively hard conditions, the pre-Columbian people in this region developed distinct cultures and subsistence farming patterns. The region has only 120 mm (4.7 in) to 160 mm (6.3 in) of annual precipitation. The sparse rainfall feeds seasonal creeks and waterholes.

The term was introduced by American anthropologist Gary Paul Nabhan in 1985, building on prior work by anthropologists A. L. Kroeber and Paul Kirchhoff to identify a "true cultural entity" for the desert region. Kirchhoff coined the similar term 'Arid America' in 1954, writing, "I propose for that of the gatherers the name 'Arid America' and 'Arid American Culture,' and for that of the farmers 'Oasis America' and 'American Oasis Culture'".

Mexican anthropologist Guillermo Bonfil Batalla notes that although the distinction between Aridoamerica and Mesoamerica is "useful for understanding the general history of precolonial Mexico," that the boundary between the two should not be conceptualized as "a barrier that separated two radically different worlds, but, rather, as a variable limit between climatic regions." The inhabitants of Aridoamerica lived on "an unstable and fluctuating frontier" and were in "constant relations with the civilizations to the south."

== Subsistence ==
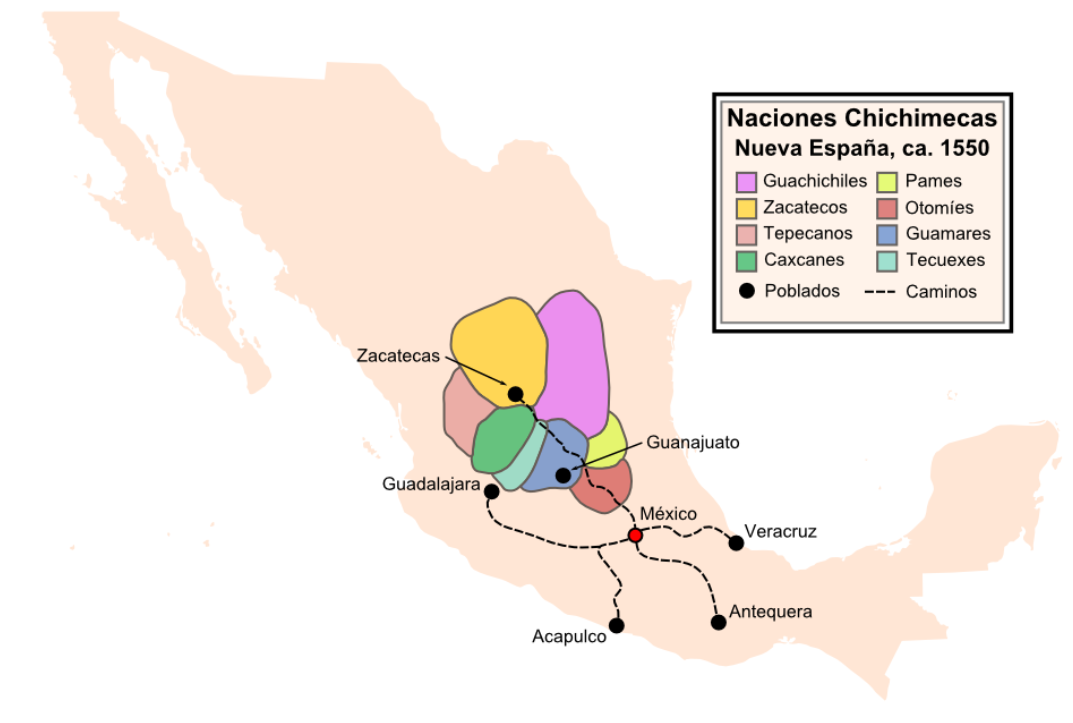
Distribution of tribes called Chichimeca, ca. 1550

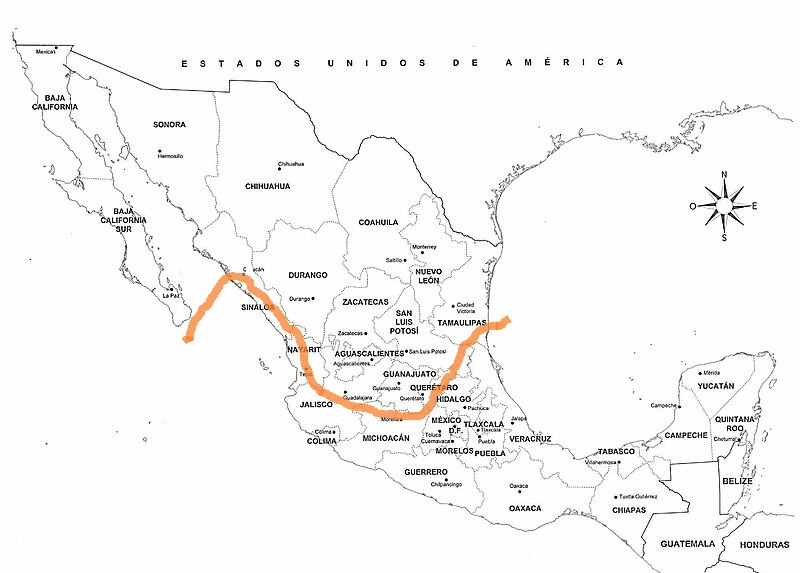
Aridoamerica

The Chichimeca, an umbrella term for several tribes used by the Nahua people, were hunter-gatherers in Aridoamerica grasslands. They gathered magueys, yucca flowers, mesquite beans, chia seeds, and cacti, including the paddles of fruits of nopal cactus. The century plant (Agave americana) is a particularly important resource in the region.

Despite dry conditions, Aridoamerica boasts the greatest diversity of wild and domesticated tepary beans (Phaseolus acutifolius) and is a possible site of their domestication. Maize cultivation reached Aridoamerica by about 2100 BCE. Archaeologists disagree whether the plant was introduced by Uto-Aztecan migrants from Mesoamerica or spread either northward or southward from other groups by cultural borrowing.

In Baja California, fishing and hunting provided food, as did harvesting acorns, nopal, pine nuts, and other native plants.

Historically, people of Aridoamerica coppiced willows, that is, tree trunks were cut to a stump to encourage the growth of slender shoots. These willow shoots were woven tightly to produce waterproof cooking baskets. Fire-heated rocks were plunged into a gruel in the baskets to cook.

== Deserts ==
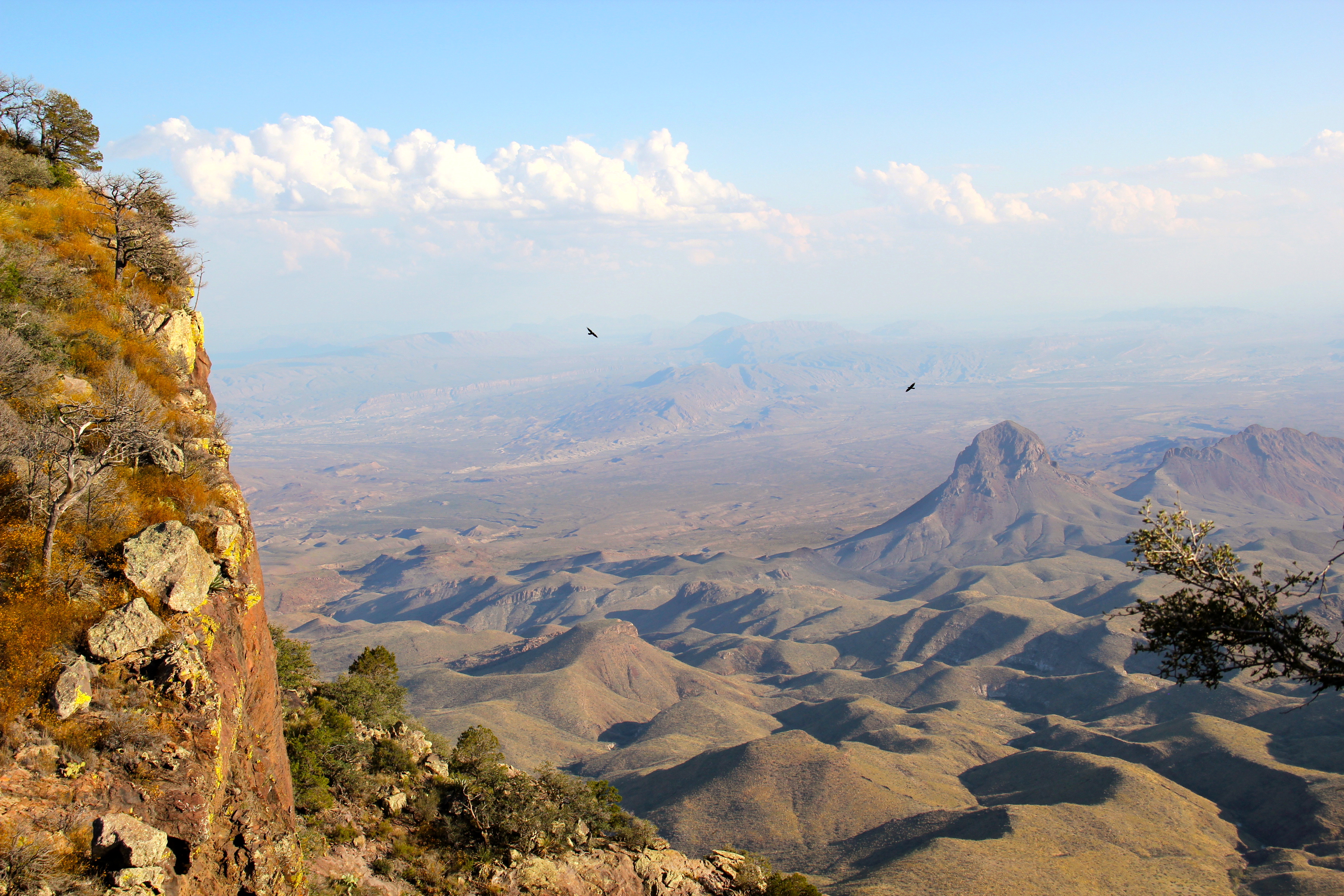
The Chihuahuan desert terrain mainly consists of basins broken by numerous small mountain ranges.

The elevation in the Chihuahuan Desert varies from 1970 to 5500 feet, as there are several smaller mountain ranges contained in the area, namely the San Andres, Doña Anas, and Franklin Mountains. The Chihuahuan is a "rain shadow" desert, formed between two mountain ranges (the Sierra Madre Occidental on the west and the Sierra Madre Oriental on the east) which block oceanic precipitation from reaching the area. The Chihuahuan Desert is considered the "most biologically diverse desert in the Western Hemisphere and one of the most diverse in the world", and includes more species of cacti than any other desert in the world. The most prolific plants in this region are agave, yucca, and creosote bushes, in addition to the ubiquitous presence of various cacti species.

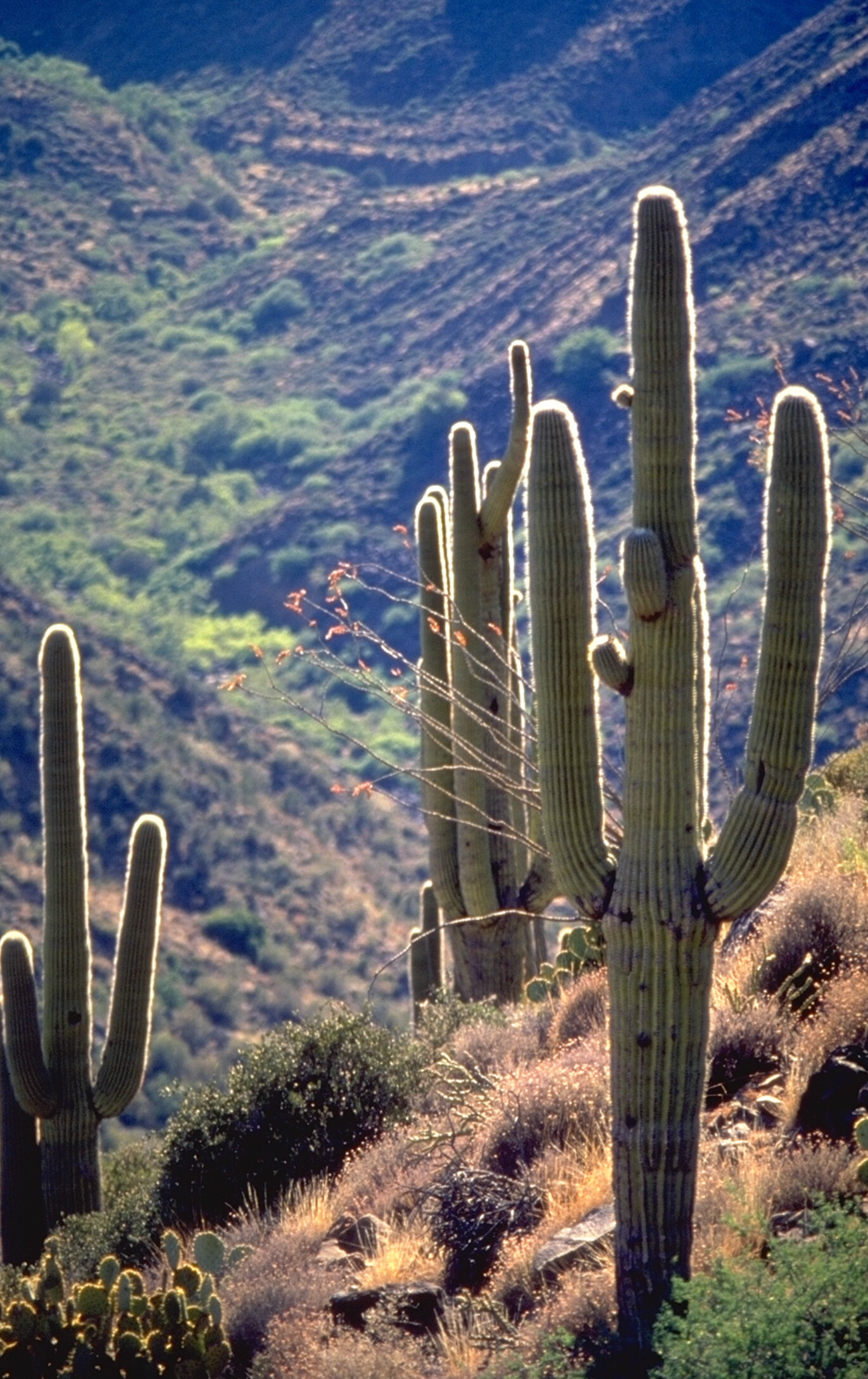
Saguaro cactus in the Sonoran Desert.

When people think of the desert southwest, the landscape of the Sonoran Desert is what mostly comes to mind. The Sonoran Desert makes up the southwestern portion of the Southwest. Rainfall averages between 4–12 inches per year, and the desert's most widely known inhabitant is the saguaro cactus, which is unique to the desert. It is bounded on the northwest by the Mojave Desert, to the north by the Colorado Plateau and to the east by the Arizona Mountains forests and the Chihuahuan Desert. Aside from the trademark saguaro, the desert has the most diverse plant life of any desert in the world, and includes many other species of cacti, including the organ-pipe, senita, prickly pear, barrel, fishhook, hedgehog, cholla, silver dollar, and jojoba.

The most northwest portion of Aridoamerica is covered by the Mojave Desert. In terms of topography, the Mojave is very similar to the Great Basin Desert, which lies just to its north. The Mojave gets less than six inches of rain annually, and its elevation ranges from 3000 to 6000 feet above sea level. The most prolific vegetation is the tall Joshua tree, which grow as tall as 40 feet, and are thought to live almost 1000 years. Other major vegetation includes the Parry saltbush and the Mojave sage, both only found in the Mojave, as well as the creosote bush.

== Wildlife ==
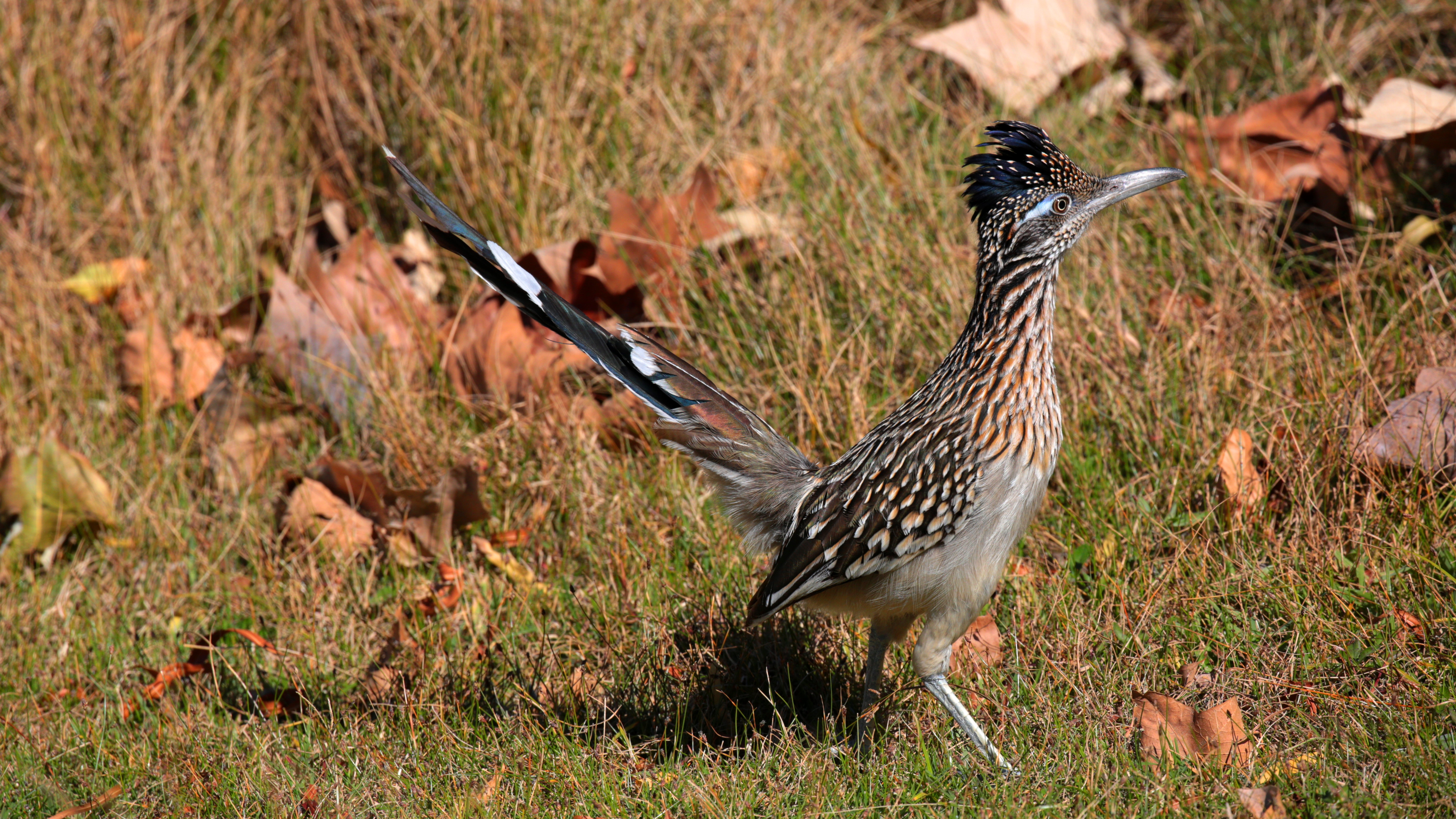
Roadrunner

The region has an extremely diverse bird population, with hundreds of species being found in Aridoamerica. In the Chiricahua Mountains alone, in southeastern Arizona, there can be found more than 400 species. Species include Canada (Branta canadensis) and snow geese, sandhill cranes (Grus canadensis), and the roadrunner, the most famous bird in the region. Birds of prey include the red-tailed hawk (Buteo jamaicensis), Cooper's hawk (Accipiter cooperii), osprey (Pandion haliaetus), golden eagle (Aquila chrysaetos), Harris's hawk (Parabuteo unicinctus), common black hawk (Buteogallus anthracinus), zone-tailed hawk (Buteo albonotatus), bald eagle (Haliaeetus leucocephalus), Swainson's hawk (Buteo swainsoni), American kestrel (Falco sparverius), prairie falcon (Falco mexicanus), peregrine falcon (Falco peregrinus), gray hawk (Buteo plagiatus), barn owl (Tyto alba), the western screech owl (Megascops kennicottii), whiskered screech-owl (Megascops trichopsis), great horned owl (Bubo virginianus), long-eared owl (Asio otus), elf owl (Micrathene whitneyi), ferruginous pygmy-owl (Glaucidium brasilianum), and burrowing owl, (Athene cunicularia). among many others.

Other bird species include the turkey vulture (Cathartes aura) and black vulture (Coragyps atratus); the northern cardinal (Cardinalis cardinalis) and its close relative the pyrrhuloxia (Cardinalis sinuous); the blue grosbeak (Passerina caerulea) and black-headed grosbeak (Pheucticus melanocephalus); the varied bunting (Passerina versicolor), house finch (Carpodacus mexicanus), and lesser goldfinch (Spinus psaltria); the broad-billed hummingbird (Cynanthus latirostris), black-chinned hummingbird (Archilochus alexandri), Costa's hummingbird (Calypte costae), Anna's hummingbird (Calypte anna), Rivoli's hummingbird (Eugenes fulgens), blue-throated mountain-gem (Lampornis clemenciae), and lucifer hummingbird (Calothorax lucifer); and the Gambel's quail (Callipepla gambelii), common raven (Corvus corax), Gila woodpecker (Melanerpes uropygialis), gilded flicker (Colaptes chrysoides), cactus wren (Campylorhynchus brunneicapillus), rock wren (Salpinctes obsoletus), and many oriole (Icterus), thrasher (Toxostoma), gnatcatcher (Polioptila), dove (Columbidae), rail (Rallidae), and tyrant-flycatcher (Tyrannidae) species.

Mammal species include the bobcat (Lynx rufus), coyote (Canis latrans), collared peccary (Pecari tajacu), black bear (Ursus americanus), black-tailed jackrabbit (Lepus californicus), desert cottontail (Sylvilagus audubonii), desert bighorn sheep (Ovis canadensis nelsoni), mule deer (Odocoileus hemionus), Coues' white-tailed deer (Odocoileus virginianus couesi), elk (Cervus canadensis), feral horse (Equus caballus), ringtail (Bassariscus astutus), gray fox (Urocyon cinereoargenteus), kit fox (Vulpes macrotis), mountain lion (Puma concolor), river otter (Lontra canadensis), long-tailed weasel (Neogale frenata), western spotted skunk (Spilogale gracilis), pronghorn antelope (Antilocapra americana), raccoon (Procyon lotor), numerous kangaroo rat (Dipodomys), woodrat (Neotoma), and pocket mouse (Chaetodipus) species, white-nosed coati (Nasua narica), jaguar (Panthera onca), and Mexican wolf (Canis lupus baileyae). There is also a great diversity of bat species in the region.

There is a large contingent of snakes native to the region. Among them include: the rosy boa (Lichanura trivirgata); several sub-species of the glossy snake (Arizona elegans); the Trans-Pecos ratsnake (Bogertophis subocularis); several sub-species of shovel-nosed snakes; several sub-species of kingsnake, including the desert kingsnake (Lampropeltis getula splendida) and the Arizona mountain kingsnake (Lampropeltis pyromelana); the Arizona coral snake (Micruroides euryxanthus); the western diamondback rattlesnake (Crotalus atrox); the Trans-Pecos copperhead (Agkistrodon contortrix pictigaster); the Sonoran sidewinder (Crotalus cerastes cercobombus); the Arizona black rattlesnake (Crotalus oreganus cerberus); the western rattlesnake (Crotalus viridis); the Grand Canyon rattlesnake (Crotalus oreganus abyssus), found only in Arizona; several sub-species of the ridge-nosed rattlesnake (Crotalus willardi), and the desert massasauga (Sistrurus catenatus edwardsii).

Other reptiles in the region include lizards and turtles. Lizards are highly represented in the region, the most distinctive denizen being the Gila monster, native only to the American Southwest and the state of Sonora in Mexico. Other lizards include: Sonoran collared lizard (Crotaphytus nebrius); several types of geckos, including western banded gecko (Coleonyx variegatus), the barefoot banded gecko (Coleonyx switaki), and the Mediterranean house gecko (Hemidactylus turcicus), the latter species being non-native to the region and confined to developed areas; the desert iguana (Dipsosaurus dorsalis); the chuckwalla (Sauromalus ater); the greater earless lizard (Cophosaurus texanus scitulus); several sub-species of horned lizards (Phrynosoma); numerous species of spiny lizards (Sceloporus); Gilbert's skink (Plestiodon gilberti); the western skink (Plestiodon skiltonianus); Trans-Pecos striped whiptail (Aspidoscelis inornata heptagrammus); and the Arizona night lizard (Xantusia arizonae). Turtles are less numerous than their other reptilian counterparts, but several are found in the region, including: the western painted turtle (Chrysemys picta bellii); the Rio Grande cooter (Pseudemys gorzugi); the desert box turtle (Terrapene ornata luteola); the Big Bend slider (Trachemys gaigeae gaigeae); the Sonora mud turtle (Kinosternon sonoriense); and the desert tortoise (Gopherus agassizii).

Amphibians include numerous toads and frogs. Toads which can be found in the region include: the Great Plains toad (Anaxyrus cognatus); the green toad (Anaxyrus debilis); the Arizona toad (Anaxyrus microscaphus); the New Mexico spadefoot (Spea multiplicata stagnalis); and the Colorado River toad (Incilius alvarius), also known as the Sonoran Desert toad. Frog representation includes: western barking frog (Craugastor augusti); the canyon tree frog (Hyla arenicolor); the Arizona treefrog (Hyla wrightorum); the western chorus frog (Pseudacris triseriata); Chiricahua leopard frog (Lithobates chiricahuensis); and the relict leopard frog (Lithobates onca). There are quite a few salamanders throughout the region, including: the Arizona tiger salamander (Ambystoma mavortium nebulosum) and the painted ensatina (Ensatina eschscholtzii picta).

== Political geography ==
Map of Aridoamerica, Oasisamerica, and Mesoamerica

The current Mexican states that lie in Aridoamerica are:

- Aguascalientes
- Baja California
- Baja California Sur
- Coahuila
- Chihuahua
- Durango
- Nayarit
- Nuevo León
- San Luis Potosí
- Sinaloa
- Sonora
- Tamaulipas
- Zacatecas

The northern parts of:

- Hidalgo
- Guanajuato
- Querétaro
- Jalisco

The southern portions of the United States that lie within Aridoamerica are:

- Arizona
- California
- Nevada
- New Mexico
- Texas

== Aridoamerica cultures ==
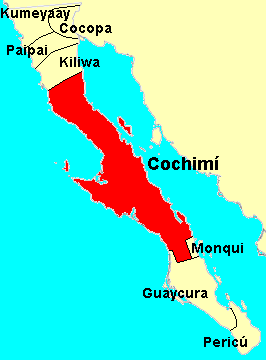
Map of Indigenous peoples in Baja California

- Acaxee
- Aranama (Hanáma, Hanáme, Chaimamé, Chariname, Xaraname, Taraname), coastal Texas
- Caxcane
- Coahuiltecan, Texas, northern Mexico
- Cochimí, Baja California
- Cocopá (Cocopah), Baja California
- Comecrudo, Texas, northern Mexico
- Cotoname (Carrizo de Camargo)
- Guachichil
- Guachimontone
- Guamare
- Guaycura, Baja California
- Huarijio
- Huichol
- Karankawa, coastal Texas
- Kiliwa, Baja California
- Kumiai (Kumeyaay), Baja California
- La Junta, Southwest Texas, Northern Chihuahua

- Jumanos, Southwest Texas
- Otomoacos, Southwest Texas, Northern Chihuahua

- Mamulique, Texas, northern Mexico
- Manso, Texas, Chihuahua
- Mayo
- Mogollon culture, ca. 200–1500 CE, also Oasisamerica
- Monqui, Baja California
- Opata
- Otomi
- Pai Pai, Baja California
- Pame
- Pericúe (Pericú), Baja California
- Pima Bajo, Chihuahua and Sonora
- Quems, Coahuila and Texas
- Solano, Coahuila and Texas
- Seri
- Tamique, Texas
- Tarahumara
- Tecuexe
- Tepecano
- Tepehuán
- Teuchitlan tradition
- Toboso, Chihuahua and Coahuila
- Western Mexico shaft tomb tradition
- Yaqui (Yoeme), Arizona, Sonora
- Zacateco

== See also ==
- Classification of indigenous peoples of the Americas
- Great Mural Rock Art, Baja California
- Mesoamerica
- Oasisamerica
