= Oasisamerica =

Pre-Columbian cultural region of North America

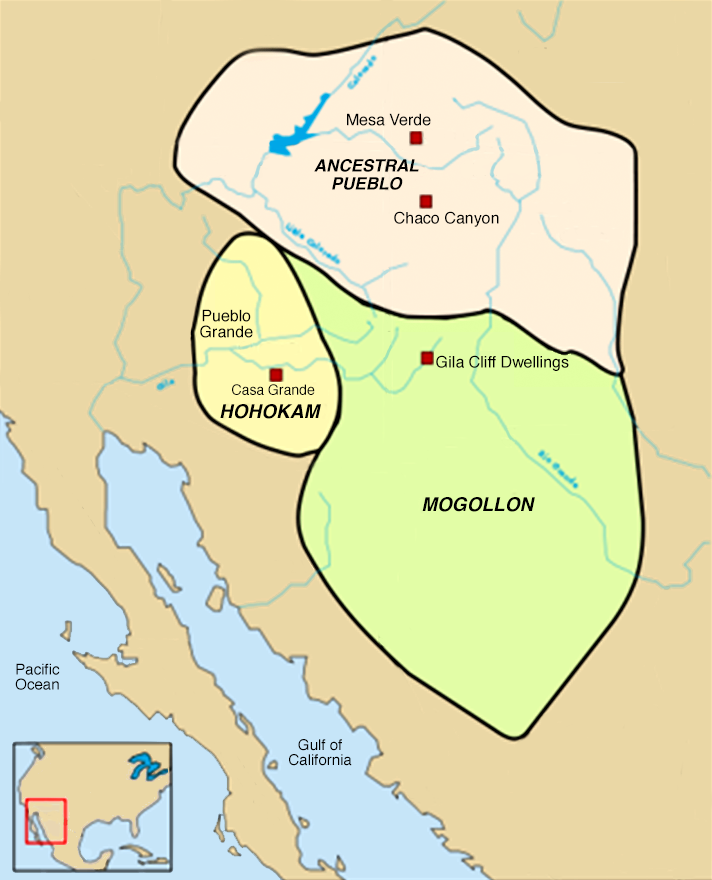
Oasisamerica cultural areas, circa 1350

Oasisamerica is a cultural region of Indigenous peoples in North America. Their precontact cultures were predominantly agrarian, in contrast with neighboring tribes to the south in Aridoamerica. The region spans parts of Northwestern Mexico and Southwestern United States and can include most of Arizona and New Mexico; southern parts of Utah and Colorado; and northern parts of Sonora and Chihuahua. During some historical periods, it might have included parts of California and Texas as well.

The term was first proposed by German-Mexican anthropologist Paul Kirchhoff, who also coined Mesoamerica and Aridoamerica, and is used by some scholars, primarily Mexican anthropologists, for the broad cultural area defining pre-Columbian southwestern North America. It extends from modern-day Utah down to southern Chihuahua, and from the coast on the Gulf of California eastward to the Río Bravo river valley. Its name comes from its position in relationship with the similar regions of Mesoamerica and mostly nomadic Aridoamerica.

== List of peoples ==
- Ak Chin, Arizona
- Southern Athabaskan
  - Chiricahua Apache, New Mexico and Oklahoma
  - Jicarilla Apache, New Mexico
  - Lipan Apache, Texas
  - Mescalero Apache, New Mexico
  - Navajo (Navaho, Diné), Arizona and New Mexico
  - San Carlos Apache, Arizona
  - Tonto Apache, Arizona
  - Western Apache (Coyotero Apache), Arizona
  - White Mountain Apache, Arizona
- Aranama (Hanáma, Hanáme, Chaimamé, Chariname, Xaraname, Taraname)
- Coahuiltecan, Texas, northern Mexico
- Cocopa, Arizona, northern Mexico
- Comecrudo, Texas, northern Mexico
- Cotoname (Carrizo de Camargo)
- Halchidhoma, Arizona and California
- Hualapai, Arizona
- Havasupai, Arizona
- Hohokam, formerly Arizona
- Karankawa, Texas
- Kavelchadhom
- La Junta, Texas, Chihuahua
- Mamulique, Texas, northern Mexico
- Manso, Texas, Chihuahua
- Maricopa, Arizona
- Mojave, Arizona, California, and Nevada
- Pima, Arizona
- Pima Bajo
- Pueblo peoples, Arizona, New Mexico, Western Texas
  - Ancestral Pueblo, formerly Arizona, Colorado, New Mexico, Utah
  - Hopi-Tewa (Arizona Tewa, Hano), Arizona, joined the Hopi during the Pueblo Revolt
  - Hopi, Arizona
  - Keres people, New Mexico
    - Acoma Pueblo, New Mexico
    - Cochiti Pueblo, New Mexico
    - Kewa Pueblo (formerly Santo Domingo Pueblo), New Mexico
    - Laguna Pueblo, New Mexico
    - San Felipe Pueblo, New Mexico
    - Santa Ana Pueblo, New Mexico
    - Zia Pueblo, New Mexico
  - Tewa people, New Mexico
    - Nambé Pueblo, New Mexico
    - Ohkay Owingeh (formerly San Juan Pueblo), New Mexico
    - Pojoaque Pueblo, New Mexico
    - San Ildefonso Pueblo, New Mexico
    - Tesuque Pueblo, New Mexico
    - Santa Clara Pueblo, New Mexico
  - Tiwa people, New Mexico
    - Isleta Pueblo, New Mexico
    - Picuris Pueblo, New Mexico
    - Sandia Pueblo, New Mexico
    - Taos Pueblo, New Mexico
    - Ysleta del Sur Pueblo (Tigua Pueblo), Texas
    - Piro Pueblo, New Mexico
  - Towa people
    - Jemez Pueblo (Walatowa), New Mexico
    - Pecos (Ciquique) Pueblo, New Mexico
  - Zuni people (Ashiwi), New Mexico
- Quechan (Yuma), Arizona and California
- Quems
- Solano, Coahuila, Texas
- Tamique
- Toboso
- Tohono O'odham, Arizona and Mexico
  - Qahatika, Arizona
- Tompiro
- Ubate
- Walapai, Arizona
- Yaqui (Yoeme), Arizona, Sonora
- Yavapai, Arizona
  - Tolkapaya (Western Yavapai), Arizona
  - Yavapé (Northwestern Yavapai), Arizona
  - Kwevkapaya (Southeastern Yavapai), Arizona
  - Wipukpa (Northeastern Yavapai), Arizona

== Geography ==
The term Oasisamerica combines "oasis" and "America". It refers to the land dominated by the Rocky Mountains and the Sierra Madre Occidental. To the east and west of these mountain ranges stretch the arid plains of the Sonora, Chihuahua, and Arizona Deserts. At its height, Oasisamerica covered part of the present-day Mexican states of Chihuahua, Sonora and Baja California, as well as the U.S. states of Arizona, Utah, New Mexico, Colorado, Nevada, and California.

Despite being a dry land, Oasisamerica contains several bodies of water like rivers: Yaqui, Rio Grande, Colorado, Conchos and Gila Rivers. The presence of these rivers (and even some lakes that have since been swallowed by the desert), combined with a climate that was much milder than eastern Aridoamerica, allowed the development of agricultural techniques that were imported from Mesoamerica.

== Characteristics of the Oasisamerican cultures ==
=== Cultural development ===
The story of the origins of the cultural superarea of Mesoamerica takes place some 2,000 years after the cultural separation of Mesoamerica and Aridoamerica. Some of the Aridoamerican communities farmed as a complement to their hunter-gatherer economy. Those communities, including members of the Desert tradition, later would become more truly agricultural and form Oasisamerica.

Maize has been grown in this region since 3500 BC and possibly 4000 BC, based on maize remnants (alongside squash) found in Bat Cave, New Mexico. The oldest evidence of maize agriculture in Mesoamerica predates this, suggesting that maize agriculture entered Oasisamerica from the south. It is likely that all precontact agricultural crops, except the tepary bean (Phaseolus acutifolius) were imported from Mesoamerica.

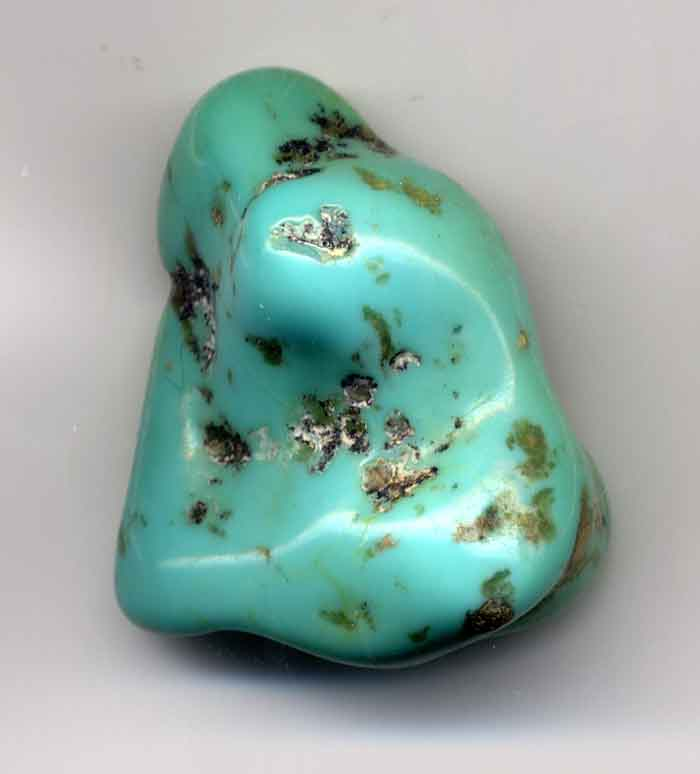
A pebble of turquoise

There are many indications of a close relationship between the two great cultural regions of North America. For one, the turquoise used by Mesoamericans came almost exclusively from southern New Mexico and Arizona. Demand for this mineral may have played a large part in establishing trade relationships between the two cultural areas. At the same time, in Paquimé, a site connected to the Mogollon culture, there are ceremonial structures related to Mesoamerican religion and an important number of skeletons of Macaws that were carefully transported from the forests of southeastern Mexico.

== Cultural areas ==
The area encompassed by Oasisamerica fostered the growth of several major cultural groups: the Ancestral Pueblo people, Hohokam, Mogollon, Pataya, and Fremont. Smaller cultures within this region include the Sinagua.

=== Ancestral Pueblo peoples ===
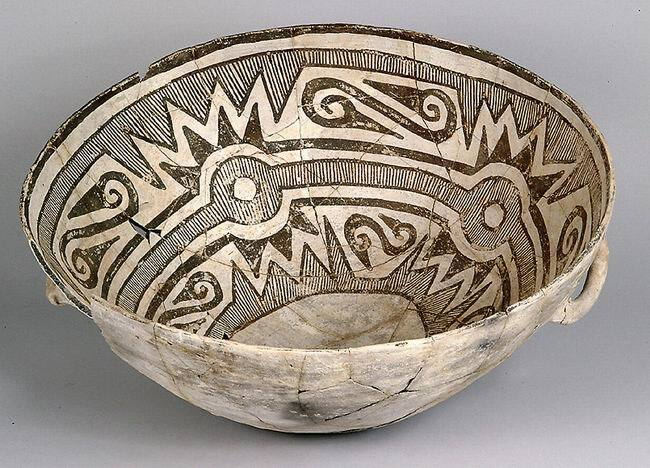
Ceramic bowl from Chaco Canyon in New Mexico which belonged to the Pueblo III phase

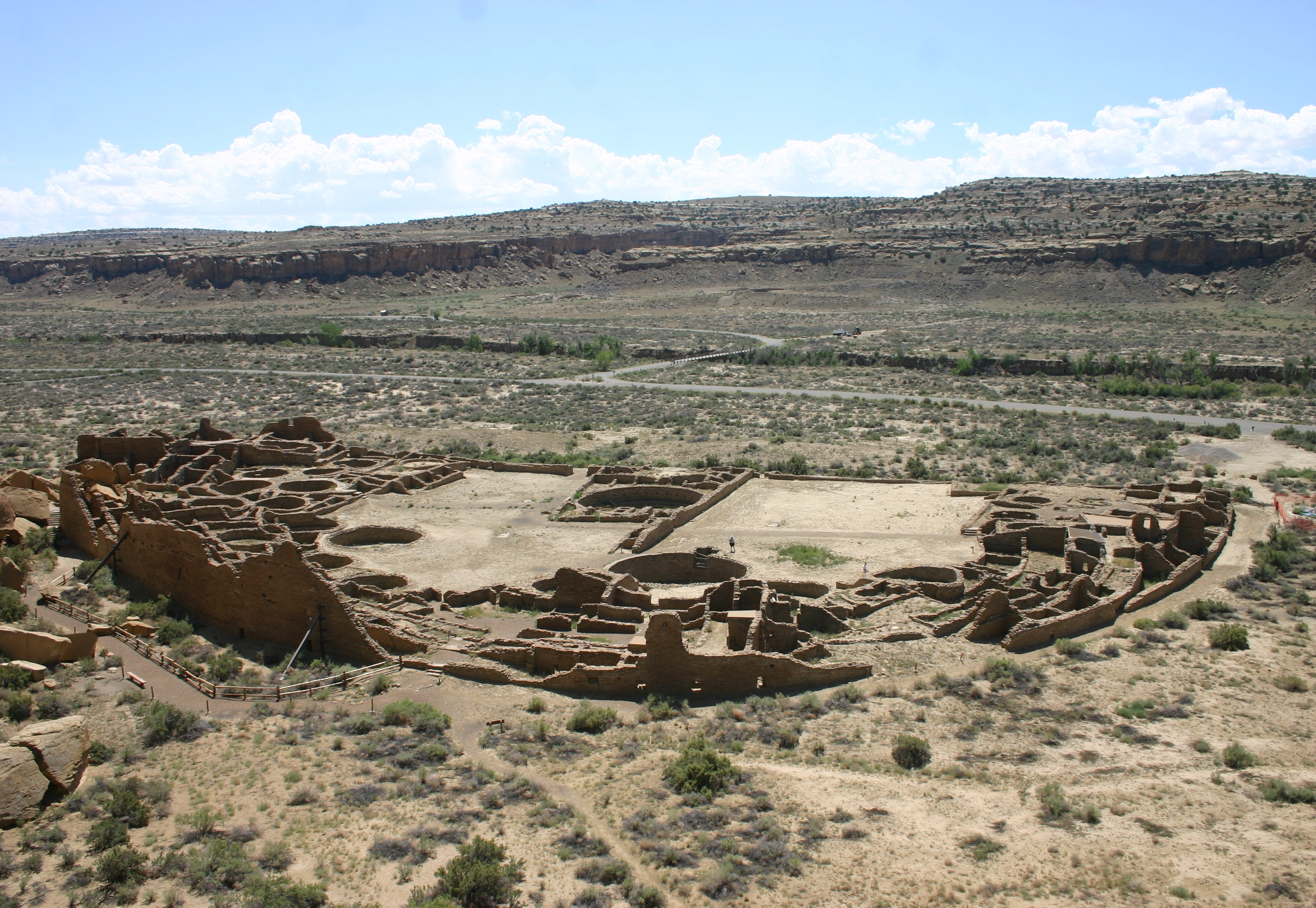
Archaeological site at Chaco Canyon, one of the principal sites of Ancestral Pueblo culture

Ancestral Pueblo cultures flourished in the region currently known as the Four Corners. The territory was covered by juniper forests which the ancient peoples learned to exploit for their own needs, since foraging among the other vegetation only sufficed for half of the year, only to fail from November to April. The Ancestral Pueblo society is one of the most complex to be found in Oasisamerica, and they are assumed to be the ancestors of the modern Pueblo people (including the Zuñi and Hopi). (The term "Anasazi" is also used to describe these cultures. It is a Navajo term meaning "enemy ancestors."

The Ancestral Pueblo is considered to be the most intensely studied precontact culture in the United States. Archaeological investigation has established a sequence of cultural development that began before the first century BC and extended to AD 1540 when the Pueblo Indians were subjugated by the Spanish Crown. This long period encompasses the Basketmaker I, II, and III phases followed by the Pueblo I, II, III, and IV phases. In the Basketmaker II phase, the Ancestral Pueblo took up residence in caves and rocky shelters, and in Basketmaker III Era (AD 500–750) they constructed the first subterranean cities with up to four abodes in a circular arrangement.

The Pueblo period begins with the development of ceramics. The most prominent feature of these ceramics is the predominance of pieces of a white or red color with black designs. During the Pueblo I phase (AD 750–900), the Ancestral Pueblo developed their first irrigation systems, and their former subterranean habitations were slowly replaced by houses constructed of masonry. Pueblo II (900–1150) is defined by the construction of great works of architecture, including multi-family, multi-story dwellings. The following phase of Pueblo III (1150–1350) witnessed the greatest expansion of Ancestral Pueblo agriculture as well as the construction of large regional communication networks that would persist until the Pueblo IV Era. In Pueblo IV (1350–1600), much of the earlier society disintegrated along with the communication networks. The current Pueblo V Era began with Spanish contact and the people settling at or near their current locations in the Rio Grande Valley.

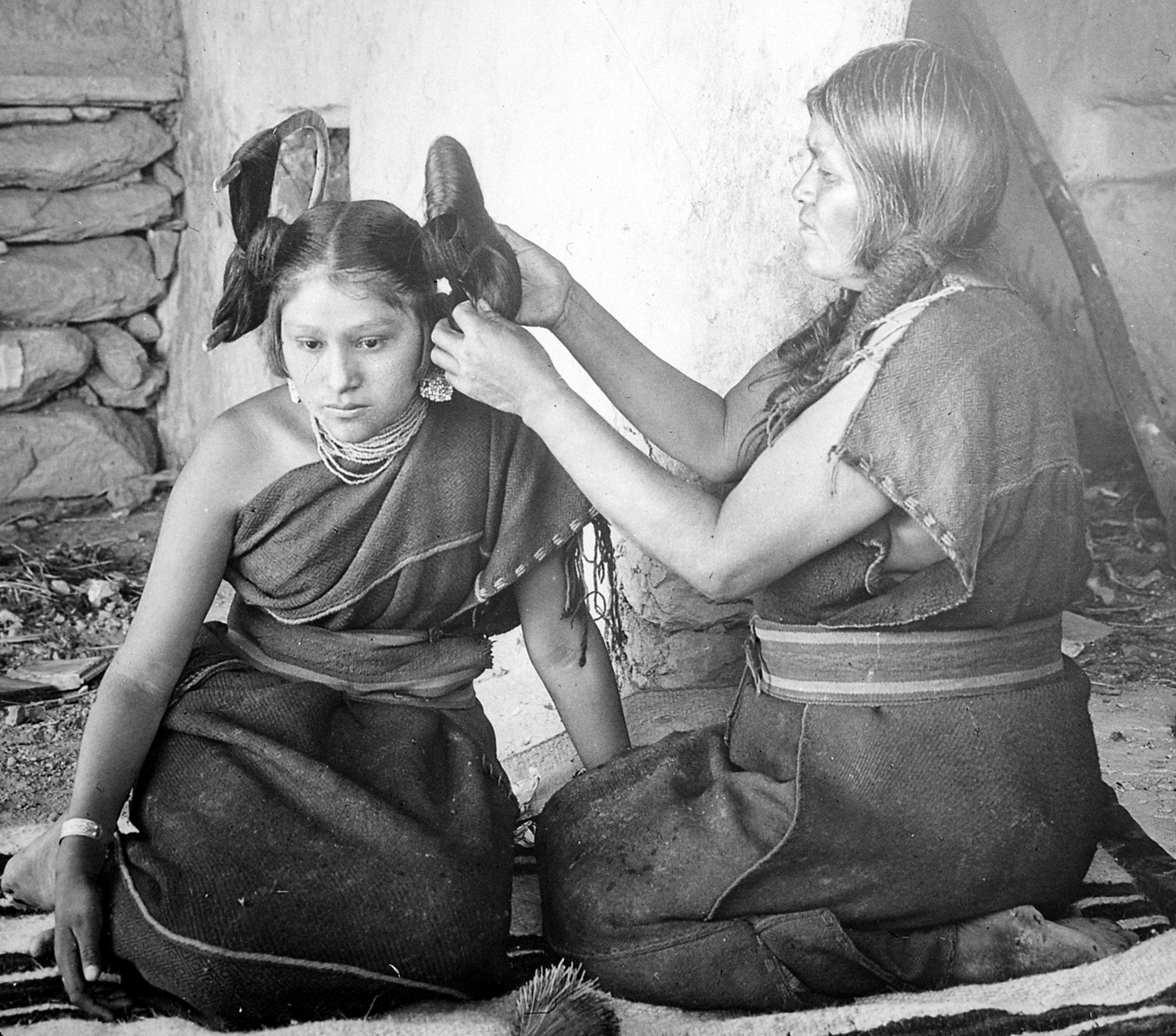
A Hopi woman dressing the hair of an unmarried girl.

The reasons underpinning the decline of the Ancestral Pueblo remain somewhat of a mystery. The phenomenon is thought to be associated with a prolonged drought that befell the region from 1276 to 1299. When the Europeans arrived at the Ancestral Pueblo region, it was populated by the Pueblo Indians, a group without a unified ethnicity. The Zuni had no apparent relatives; the Hopi spoke an Uto-Aztecan language; the Tewas and Tiwas were Tanoanos; the Zia, Acoma, Cochiti, and Kewa were Keresan; and the Navajo, who entered the southwest relatively recently, were Athabaskans.

The religion of the Pueblo Indians was based upon the worship of plant-like deities and the fertility of the earth. They believed that supernatural beings called the kachina had come to the surface of the Earth from the sipapu (center of the Earth) at the moment of the creation of the human race. Worship in Pueblo societies was organized by secret all-male groups that met in kivas. The members of these secret societies claimed to represent the kachina.

=== Hohokam ===
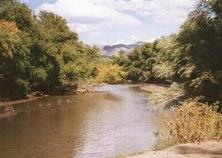
The Gila River was vitally important in the development of the Hohokam culture.

The Hohokam occupied the desert-like lands of Arizona and Sonora. The Hohokam territory is bounded by two large rivers, the Salt River (Arizona) and Gila Rivers, that outline the heart of the Sonora Desert. The surrounding ecosystem presented many challenges to agriculture and human life because of its high temperatures and scant rainfall. Due to these factors, the Hohokam were forced to construct irrigation systems with elaborate webs of reservoirs and canals for the Salt and Gila rivers that could reach several meters in depth and 10 km in length. Thanks to these canals, the Hohokam harvested as many as two crops of corn annually.

The principal settlements of the Hohokam culture were Snaketown, Casa Grande, Red Mountain, and Pueblo de los Muertos, all of which are to be found in modern-day Arizona. The Hohokam lived in small communities of several hundred people. Their lifestyle was very similar to that of the Ancestral Pueblo in their Basketmaker III phase: semisubterranean but with spacious interiors. Several other artifacts are unique to the Hohokam, including conch necklaces (imported from the coastal regions of Greater California and Sonora) etched with acids produced by pitaya fermentation; and axes, trowels, and other stone instruments.

Archaeologists dispute the origins and ethnic identity of the Hohokam culture. Some hold that the culture developed endogenously (without outside influence), pointing to Snaketown which had its origins in the fourth century BC. Others believe the culture to be a product of migration from Mesoamerica. In defense of this line of thought, proponents point to the fact that Hohokam ceramics appeared in 300 BC (also the time of Snaketown's founding), and that before this time, there was no indication of an independent regional development of ceramics. Along the same line of reasoning, several other technological advances like the canal works and certain cultural phenomena like cremation seem to have originated in western Mesoamerica.

The development of the Hohokam culture is divided into four periods: Pioneer (300 BC–AD 550), Colonial (550–900), Sedentary (900–1100), and Classical (1100–1450). The Pioneer period commenced with the construction of the canal works. In the Colonial period, ties were strengthened with Mesoamerica. Proof of this can be found in the recovery of copper hawk bells, pyrite mirrors, and the construction of ball courts. The relations with Mesoamerica and the presence of such traded goods indicate that by the Colonial period the Hohokam had already become organized into chiefdoms. Relations with Mesoamerica would diminish in the following period, and the Hohokam turned to construct multi-story buildings like Casa Grande.

By the time the Europeans arrived in the Arizona and Sonora Deserts, a region which they named Pimería Alta, the urban centers of the Hohokam had already become abandoned presumably due to the health and ecological disasters that befell the indigenous social system. The Tohono O'odham live in this region and speak a Uto-Aztecan language. This community had an economy based on gathering and incipient agriculture on mountain slopes. They were a semi-nomadic people, probably because they had to migrate to compensate for the scarcity of food resources in the foothills of the mountains they called home.

=== Mogollon ===
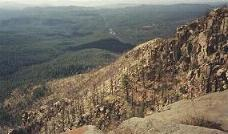
The Mogollon Mountains in southwestern New Mexico.

The Mogollon was a cultural area of Mesoamerica that extended from the foothills of the Sierra Madre Occidental, northward to Arizona and New Mexico in the southwestern United States. Some scholars prefer to distinguish between two broad cultural traditions in this area: the Mogollon itself and the Paquime culture that was derived from it. Either way, the peoples who inhabited the area in question adapted well to a landscape that was marked by the presence of pine forests and steep mountains and ravines.

In contrast to their Hohokam and Ancestral Pueblo neighbors to the north, the Mogollons usually buried their dead. The culture's graves often included ceramic art and semiprecious stones. Because the Mogollon burial sites displayed such wealth, they were often looted by grave robbers who sought to sell their spoils on the archaeological black market.

Perhaps the most impressive Mogollon ceramic tradition was to be found in the valley of the Mimbres River in New Mexico. The ceramic production of this region became most developed between the eighth and twelfth centuries. It was characterized by white pieces decorated with stylized representations of daily life in the community that created them. This was a very exceptional approach in a cultural area whose pottery was otherwise dominated by geometric patterns.

As another contrast with the Hohokam and Ancestral Pueblo, there is no widely accepted chronology for the development of the Mogollon culture. The scholars Alfredo López Austin and Leonardo López Luján, for their historical analysis of the region, borrowed a chronology proposed earlier by Paul Martin, who himself divided Mogollon history into two general periods; the "Early" period runs from 500 BC until AD 1000, and the "Late" period begins in the 11th and goes to the 16th century.

The first period featured a more or less slow cultural development. Technological changes were produced very gradually, and the form of social relationships and organizational patterns remained almost static for 1500 years. During the Early period, the Mogollons lived in rocky dwellings from which they defended themselves from the incursions of their hunter neighbors. Much like the Ancestral Pueblo peoples, the Mogollon also lived in semisubterranean abodes that often featured a kiva.

In the 11th century, the population in the Mogollon area multiplied much more rapidly than it had in the preceding centuries. During this period, the Mogollon likely benefited from trade relations with Mesoamerica, a fact that facilitated the development of agriculture and the stratification of society. It is also possible that Ancestral Pueblo influence could have grown at this time, because the Mogollon began to construct buildings of masonry, just like their northern neighbors.

The Mogollon culture reached its height in the 14th and 15th centuries. At this time, the culture's major centers grew in population, size, and power. Paquime, in Chihuahua, was perhaps the largest of those. It dominated a mountainous region that contains many archaeological sites known as casas alcantilado, outposts constructed in hard-to-reach caves on the eastern slopes of the Sierra Madre. Paquimé traded with the heart of Mesoamerica, to which it provided precious minerals like turquoise and cinnabar. It also controlled the trade of certain products from the coasts of the Gulf of California, especially its Nassarius conch shells. Paquime received heavy influence from the Mesoamerican societies, as evidenced by the presence of arenas for the Mesoamerican ballgame and the remains of animals native to Mesoamerica like the macaw.

The decline of the main centers of Mogollon power began in the 13th century, even before the apex of Paquimé. By the 15th century, a large part of the region had become abandoned by its former inhabitants. Possible descendants of the Mogollon include the Rarámuri based in Chihuahua, the Hopi in Arizona, and the Zuni in New Mexico.

=== Fremont ===
The Fremont area covered a large part of modern-day Utah. It was situated to the north of the Ancestral Pueblo cultural area. Its cultural development as a part of Oasisamerica took place between the 5th and 14th centuries. Scholars contend that the Fremont culture was derived from the Ancestral Pueblo culture. Theoretically, the Fremont communities would have emigrated toward the north, bringing with them the customs, social organization structures, and technology of the Ancestral Pueblo. This hypothesis neatly explains the presence of ceramics in Utah that are very similar to those found in Mesa Verde.

The decay of the Fremont culture began as early as the second half of the 10th century and was completed in the 14th century. They migrated to northwestern Utah. Upon the Spaniards' arrival, the region was occupied by the Shoshones, an Uto-Aztecan group.

=== Pataya ===
The Patayan area occupies the western part of Oasisamerica. It comprises the modern-day states of California and Arizona in the U.S., and Baja California and Sonora in Mexico. The Patayans were a peripheral culture whose cultural development was probably influenced by their Hohokam neighbors to the east. From them they would have learned the Mesoamerican ballgame, cremation techniques, and techniques for the production of ceramics.

The Patayan culture began to disappear in the 14th century. When the Spanish arrived in the region, the Colorado River Valley was only occupied by the river-dwelling Yuman peoples.

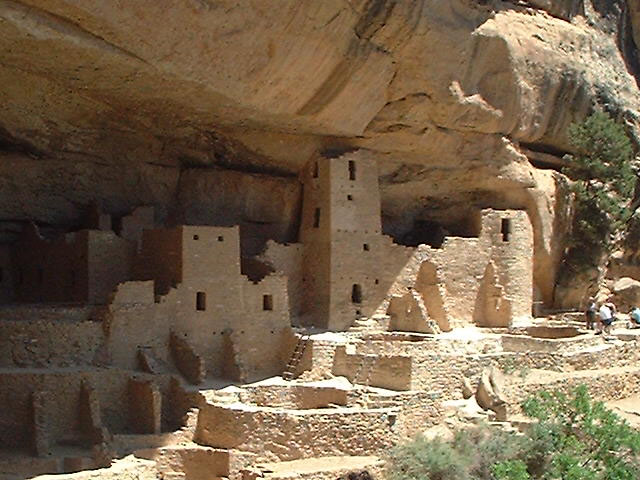
Mesa Verde

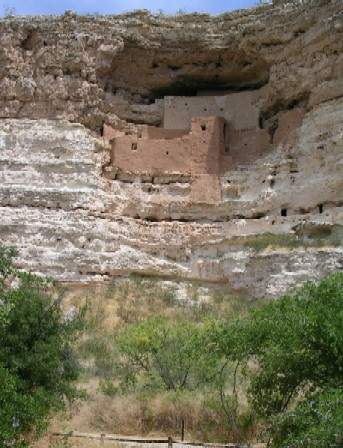
Montezuma's castle

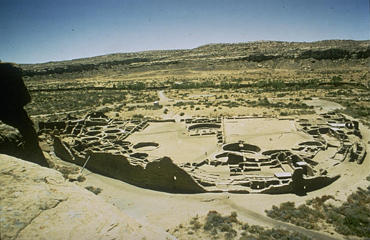
Chaco Canyon

== See also ==
- Aridoamerica
- Mesoamerica
- Agriculture in the prehistoric Southwest
- History of Mesoamerica (Paleo-Indian)
- Paleo-Indians
- List of dwellings of Pueblo peoples
- Southwestern archaeology
