= Aranama =

Aranama may refer to:

- Aranama people, a historic ethnic group of Texas
- Aranama language, an extinct language of Texas
