= XRT =

XRT may refer to:

- X-ray telescope
- Radiotherapy, in cancer treatment
- WXRT, a Chicago radio station, also known as 93-XRT
- XRayTracer, a python software library for ray tracing and wave propagation in x-ray regime
- Aranama-Tamique language, an ISO 639-3 code
- Hyundai Ioniq 5 XRT
