= G. californianus =

G. californianus may refer to:

- The california condor (Gymnogyps californianus), a New World vulture
- The greater roadrunner (Geococcyx californianus), a long-legged bird in the cuckoo family
