= Church of Analco, Puebla =

- Temple of the Holy Angel Custodian of Analco
- Templo del Santo Ángel Custodio de Analco
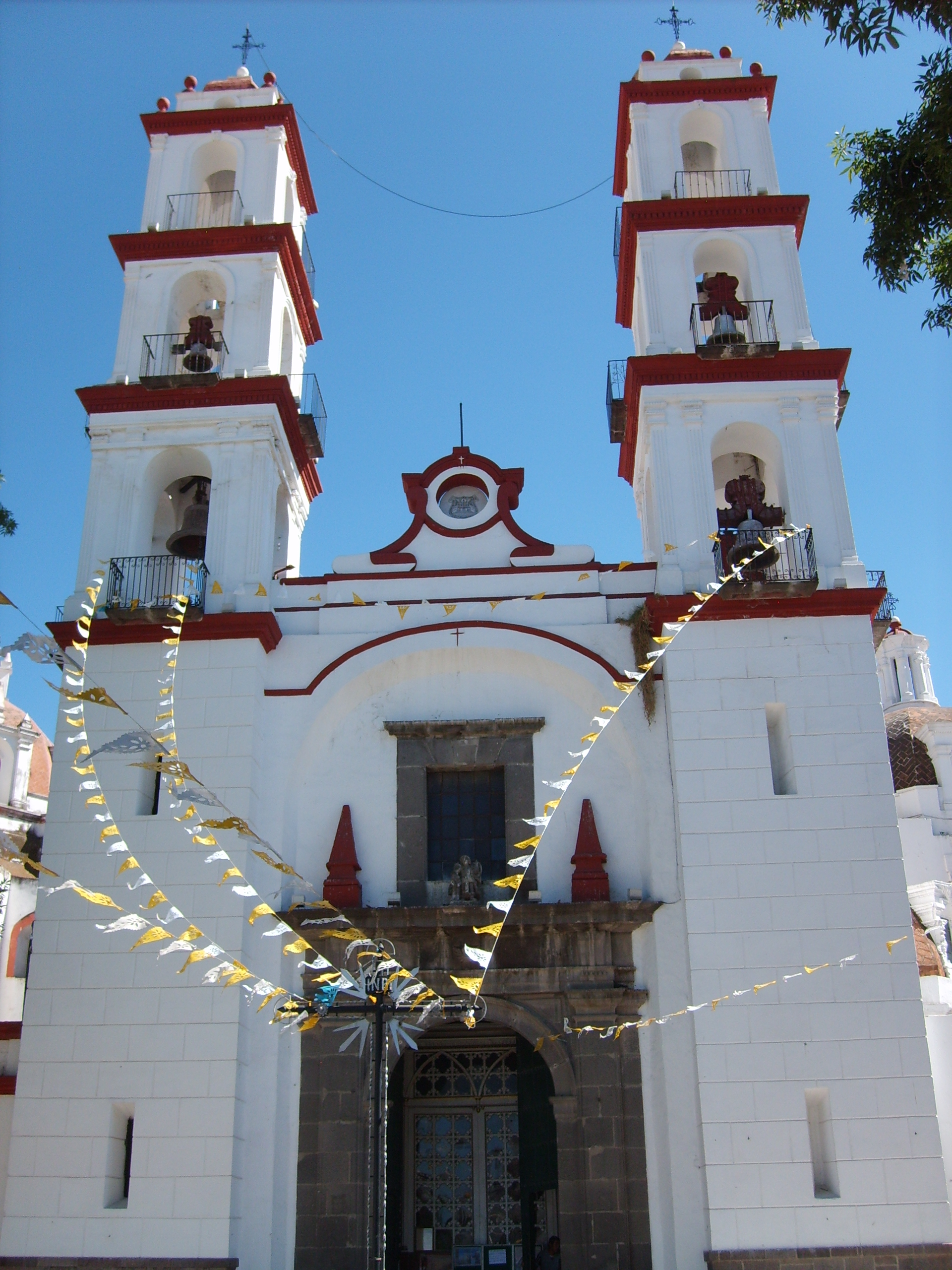
- The church's exterior in 2011

- Location of Church of Analco in Mexico
- 19°02′19.6″N 98°11′34″W
- Location: Analco, Puebla
- Country: Mexico
- Denomination: Roman Catholic

History
- Status: Church
- Founded: 1619
- Founder: Alonso de Rivera Barrientos
- Dedication: Santo Ángel de la Guarda

Architecture
- Style: Baroque
- Years built: 1618–1632

Specifications
- Materials: Masonry and stone

Administration
- Archdiocese: Roman Catholic Archdiocese of Puebla de los Ángeles

Clergy
- Priest: Herculano Palacios Orea

The Church of the Santo Ángel Custodio de Analco, commonly called the Church of Analco, is a Roman Catholic church under the jurisdiction of the Archdiocese of Puebla de los Ángeles and dedicated to the Holy Guardian Angel (Spanish: Santo Ángel de la Guarda) of Puebla. It is located in Analco, one of Puebla's oldest neighborhoods with a large indigenous population.

== History ==
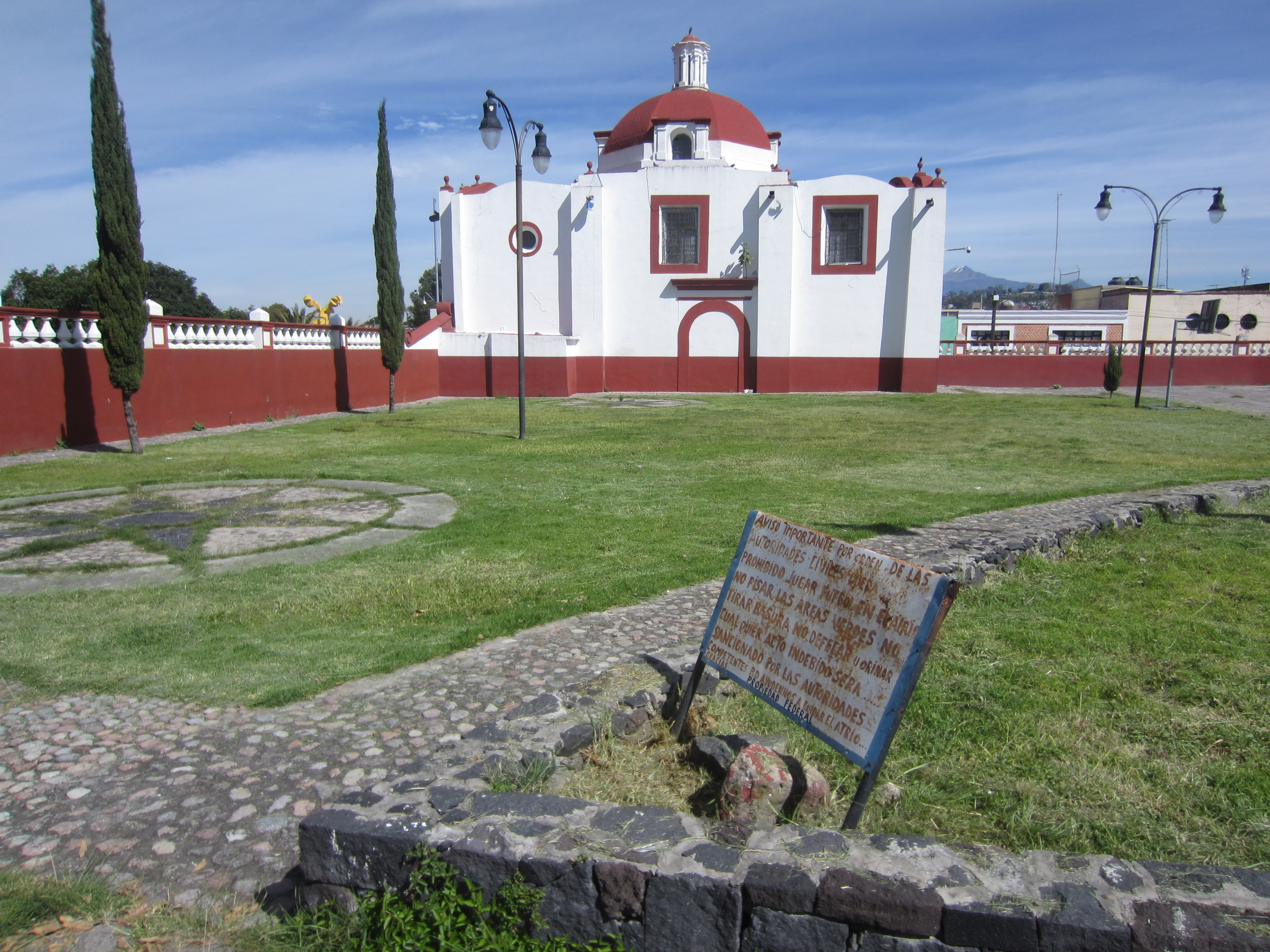
Church grounds, 2018

The church was built on the site of an older, smaller hermitage dedicated to the souls in purgatory that was constructed by the Mixtec and Tlaxcala indigenous peoples in 1560. This original hermitage was demolished by regent Alonso de Rivera Barrientos in 1618 to build the church he dedicated to the guardian angel of Puebla. The church was inaugurated by the city council (Spanish: ayuntamiento) in 1619.

Analco's indigenous population and, to a lesser degree, its Spanish population, continued to grow and ultimately needed more land and a bridge built to connect the church to the city in 1626. The Franciscans, who already had a convent in the city near the site of this church, began administering the temple in 1627. On 13 October 1627, the arrival of bishop Bernardo Gutiérrez de Quirós elevated the church to the category of parish of Analco. The congregation started a renovation campaign to befit its new status as a parish with the help of donations from its Spanish residents and the hard work of the native people of Analco.

The Bishop of Puebla, Juan de Palafox y Mendoza, secularized the church in 1640 when he installed the first diocesan priest, Fernando Díaz de Talavera. In 1767, a new chapel was completed in the church in dedication to the Virgin of Tzocuilac.

== Architecture ==
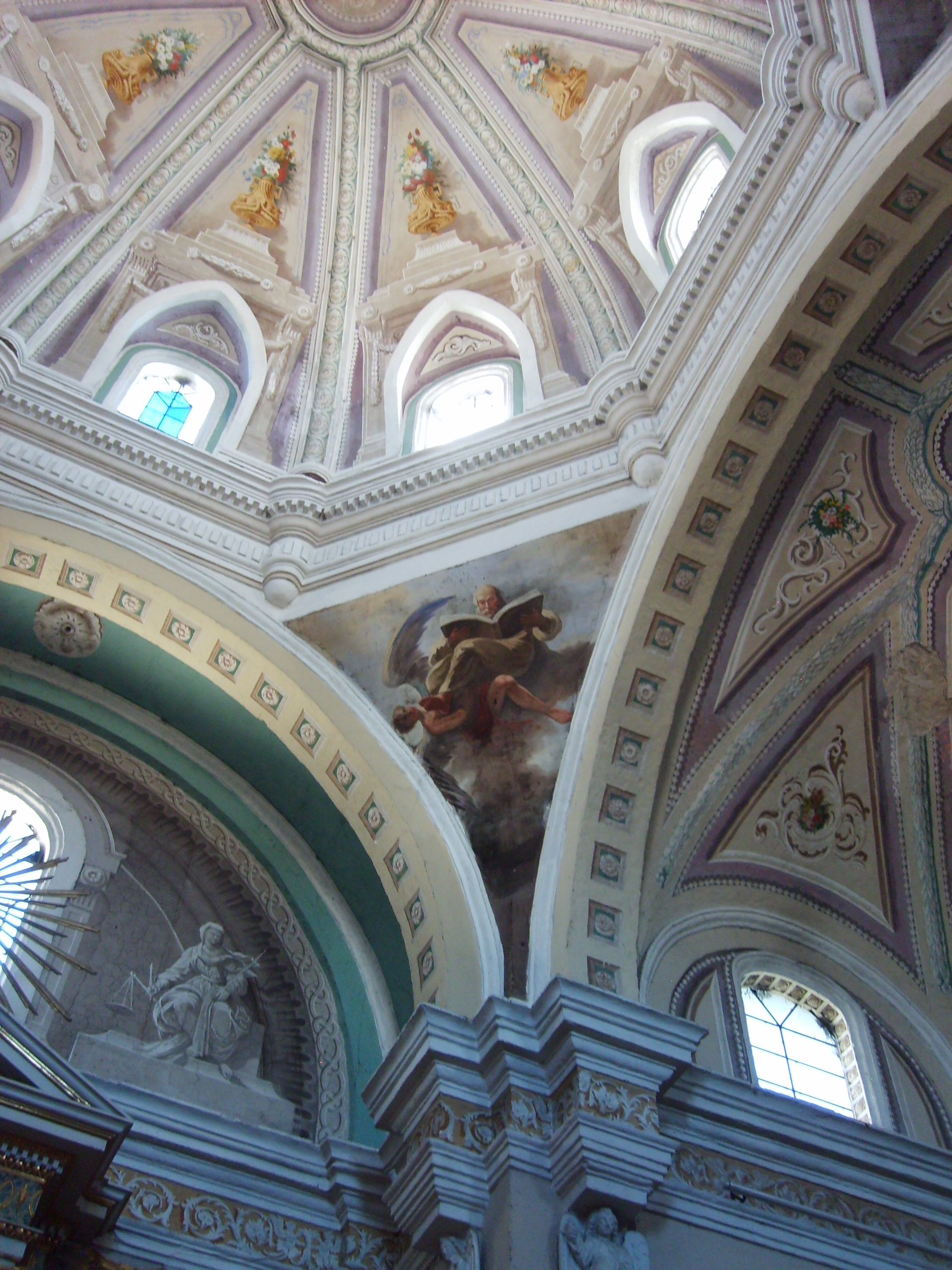
Interior detail

The church is built in an indigenous baroque style using quarried stones and mortar. The principal figure on the façade is the archangel Michael. A Latin inscription over the front door reads: ANGELE SANCTE DEI SIT SEMPER CUSTOS MEI (English: Holy Angel of God, always guard me). The façade is flanked by two tall towers, one in the south built in the 17th century, and another in the north built at the end of the 18th century.

The temple consists of a single nave with a rudimentary crossing and a dome without a drum, decorated with carved reliefs of archangels, dressed in the manner of Roman soldiers. The original baroque retables were replaced during the 19th century with others in a neoclassical style. The main retable depicts a guardian angel protecting a small child. On the epistle side, there is a chapel known as the Chapel of Veronica with a single nave. It contains a sculpture of the three falls of Jesus created by Manuel de la Paz. Next to the chapel is the baptistery, which is enclosed with a fine wrought-iron screen dated from 16 March 1780.

On the gospel side is the chapel dedicated to the Virgin of Tzocuilac, with a larger and richer wrought-iron screen donated by Roque Jaramillo de Illescas in 1767. According to legend, her painted likeness was preserved miraculously on a wall exposed to the elements. This chapel contains a trompe l'oeil painting of the Virgin Mary.

== Archaeological discoveries ==
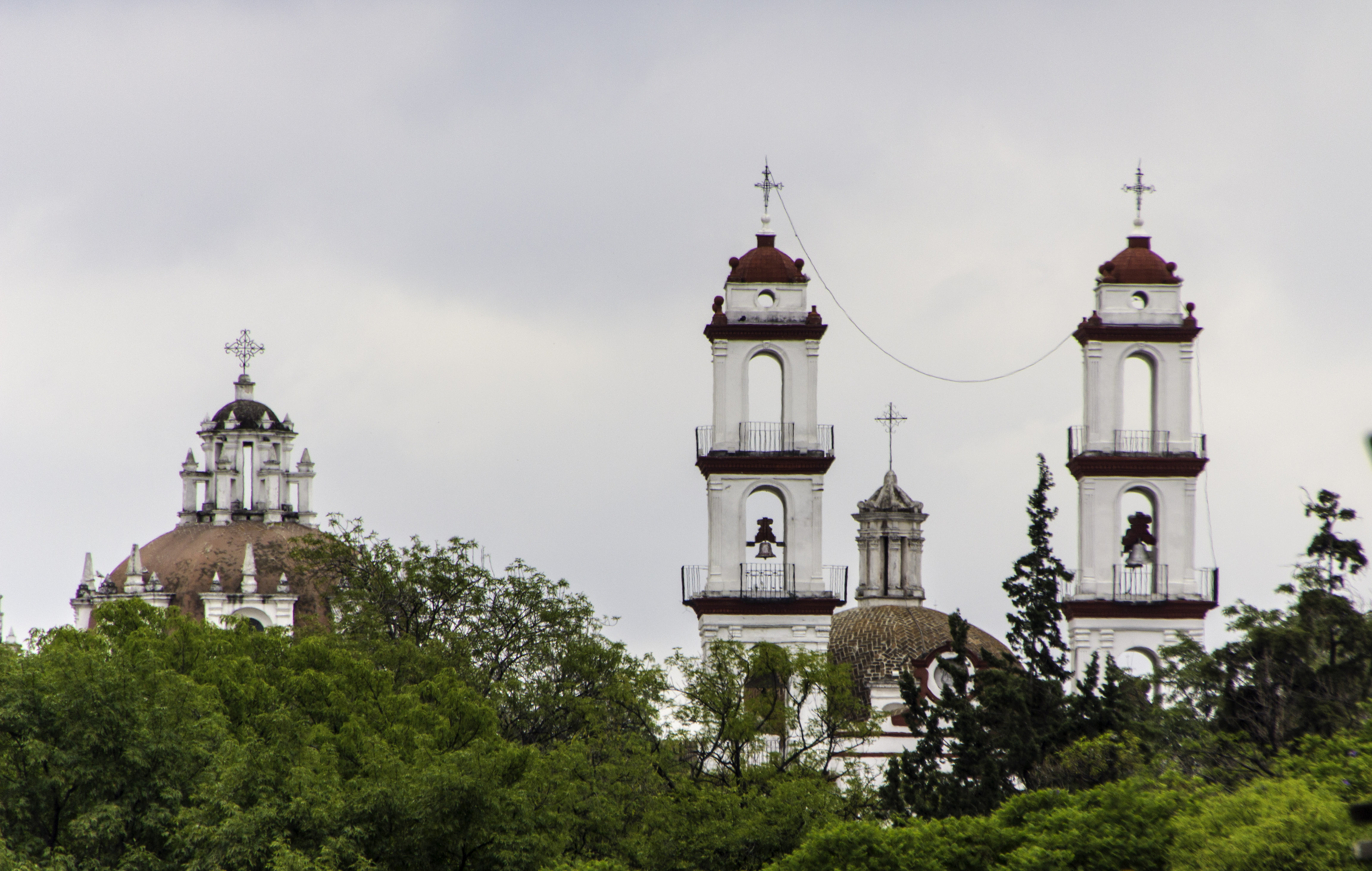
The church's towers, 2012

On 15 June 1999 a recovery and restoration effort was launched following an earthquake that caused damage to the church towers. During the restoration, it was discovered that the south tower, widely believed to be solid and merely decorative, was hollow and used during the 17th and 18th centuries. Inside the tower they found the remains of a spiral staircase leading to the belfry, human and animal bones, and a cache of antique objects. The objects found included specimens of majolica, Talavera pottery, Aranama ceramics, and glazed red clay tiles originating from a period between the late 17th and early 19th centuries. Leather shoes, glass, stone objects, wood, and baskets were also found. These objects indicated that the tower was used until the late 18th or early 19th century.

The effort also uncovered a painting on a gray stone slab of either the Immaculate Conception or the Virgin of the Light (Spanish: Virgen de la Luz). Based on the style and color palette, it is believed to be the creation of a Spanish-trained artist during the middle of the 19th century. The slab was found broken in two pieces and is believed to come from a tomb, as the church atrium was used as a cemetery until the 19th century.
