= San Marcos Foothills Preserve =

Open space in California, United States

Coordinates: 34°27′44″N 119°45′30″W

The San Marcos Foothills Preserve is a 301–acre open space located between Santa Barbara and Goleta, California and owned by the County of Santa Barbara Parks Division. The preserve provides views of the nearby Santa Ynez Mountains, the Pacific Ocean, and the Channel Islands. The preserve provides feeding grounds for many dozens of birds, including American kestrels, kites, hawks, roadrunners, and for other animals including bobcats and coyotes. The preserve is open for low-impact recreation to the public, which includes hiking/running on trails, and bird watching. The preserve is considered a bird watching “hotspot” by the birding community Since it is a nature preserve, high-impact uses such as bicycling, horseback riding and off-leash dogs are not allowed.

== Early history ==
The first inhabitants of the land were the Native Chumash people. After settlers emigrated to California, the grasslands of the San Marcos Foothills were mostly converted into fruit orchards and a dairy. By 1915, the Flying A Studios of Santa Barbara purportedly used the rolling hills of the Foothills on occasion as a backdrop for films. After World War II, single-family housing was built there and other parts were used for road widening. In 1998, a proposal for an equestrian-themed community was refused and the area became of interest to preservationists.

== First preservation efforts ==
In 1996, the community tried to protect the land, with Brooke Bulkley and Mark Holmgren forming the San Marcos Foothills Coalition (SMFC) to protect the area’s open space. By 1999, more than a dozen community organizations and people had joined the coalition. Even so, the developer bought 315 acres and donated 90% of it to what is now called the San Marcos Foothills Preserve. With that transfer, the county approved the developer’s (Chadmar Group) small development of luxury homes. By 2019, concerns were being raised that further development on the San Marcos Foothills was not in the interest of the greater public.

== Campaign to purchase the West Mesa ==
In 2020, several environmental groups led by Channel Islands Restoration and Save San Marcos Foothills began a campaign to save the 101-acre property adjacent to the preserve (known as the “West Mesa”) from development of luxury homes as part of the earlier Chadmar agreement with the County. By January 2021, a deal to buy the property had not yet been reached with the developer, but Channel Islands Restoration had already raised $1.3 million dollars toward the effort. In early February of that year, legal challenges by conservationists delayed the development and later in the month a group of activists including Native American people started a sit in protest at the gate to the property. On February 25, the developer attempted to grade a road through the property, but protesters blocked the bulldozer, preventing the construction work. Eight of the protesters were arrested and later released without charges. In March, the Chadmar Group agreed to pause the development for 90 days while conservationists attempted to raise as much as $20 million to purchase the property. By April, the campaign was well underway, but only $4 million had been raised By May, more than $10 million was raised. By June, the campaign reached its goal and the property was purchased, and ownership passed to the County of Santa Barbara in 2023.

== Habitat restoration ==
Since 2010, Channel Islands Restoration has conducted several habitat restoration projects at the preserve. The grassland restoration project has received attention from various media sources in Santa Barbara and Los Angeles, mostly because of the unique use of sheep as a way of reducing growth from non-native grasses.

=== Habitat restoration endowment ===
Following the successful campaign to purchase the West Mesa property, conservationists established a restoration endowment for the preserve. The $1,000,000 endowment is meant to support projects that restore habitat for birds and other animals.
