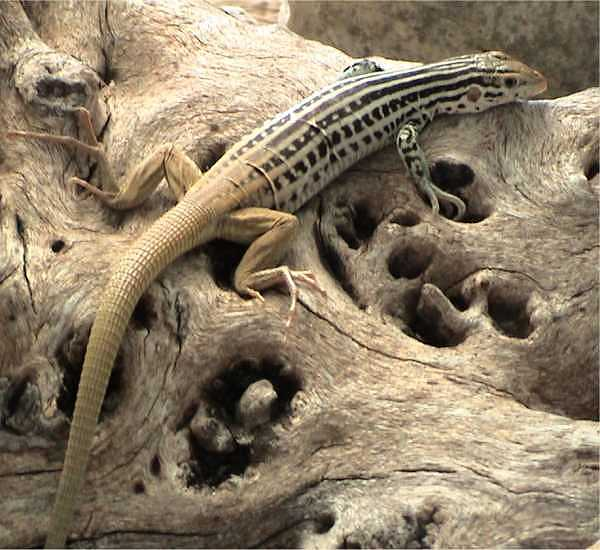
- A. inornatus heptagrammus

Conservation status
- Least Concern (IUCN 3.1)

Scientific classification
- Kingdom: Animalia
- Phylum: Chordata
- Class: Reptilia
- Order: Squamata
- Family: Teiidae
- Genus: Aspidoscelis
- Species: A. inornatus

Binomial name
- Aspidoscelis inornatus Baird, 1859

Synonyms
- Cnemidophorus perplexus Van Denburgh, 1922; Cnemidophorus gularis velox Springer, 1928; Cnemidophorus inornatus Baird, 1859

= Little striped whiptail =

Species of lizard

The little striped whiptail (Aspidoscelis inornatus) is a species of lizard found in the southwestern United States (in Arizona, New Mexico and Texas) and in northern Mexico (in Chihuahua, Coahuila, Durango, Zacatecas, San Luis Potosí, and Nuevo León). A significant amount of research was done on the species during the mid-1990s, with several new subspecies being added, many of which some sources consider to be distinct enough to warrant full species status, and the research is ongoing. It is called little to distinguish it from many other species known as striped whiptails and to indicate that it is the smallest of those species.

== Description ==
The little striped whiptail grows from 6.5 to 9.5 inches (17 to 24 cm) in length. It is typically black in color, with yellow or white striping from head to tail, and a light blue underside. It is slender bodied, with a blue colored tail approximately three times the body length. The blue coloration is much more pronounced on males than females. They are not always striped or blue: sometimes they are brown with darker patches to blend in with the sand or dirt.

== Behavior ==
Like most species of whiptail lizard, the little striped whiptail is diurnal and insectivorous. They are wary, energetic, and fast moving, darting for cover if approached. They are found in a range of habitats, from grasslands to semi-arid rocky slopes. Breeding takes place in the late spring, and clutches of 2 to 4 eggs are laid from May to July and hatch approximately six weeks later. The whiptail species eat crickets and other insects that live in Arizona. They are very fast in speed and quick to dive under a cactus if necessary.

== Subspecies ==
There are eight recognized subspecies of Cnemidophorus inornatus:

- Aspidoscelis inornatus chihuahuae (Wright & Lowe, 1993)
- Aspidoscelis inornatus cienegae (Wright & Lowe, 1993)
- Aspidoscelis inornatus heptagrammus (Axtell, 1961) - Trans-Pecos striped whiptail
- Aspidoscelis inornatus juniperus (Wright & Lowe, 1993) - woodland striped whiptail
- Aspidoscelis inornatus llanuras (Wright & Lowe, 1993)
- Aspidoscelis inornatus inornatus (Baird, 1859)
- Aspidoscelis inornatus octolineatus (Baird, 1858)
- Aspidoscelis inornatus paululus (Williams, 1968)
