= Mission Nuestra Señora del Espíritu Santo de Zúñiga =

Historic place in Texas, US

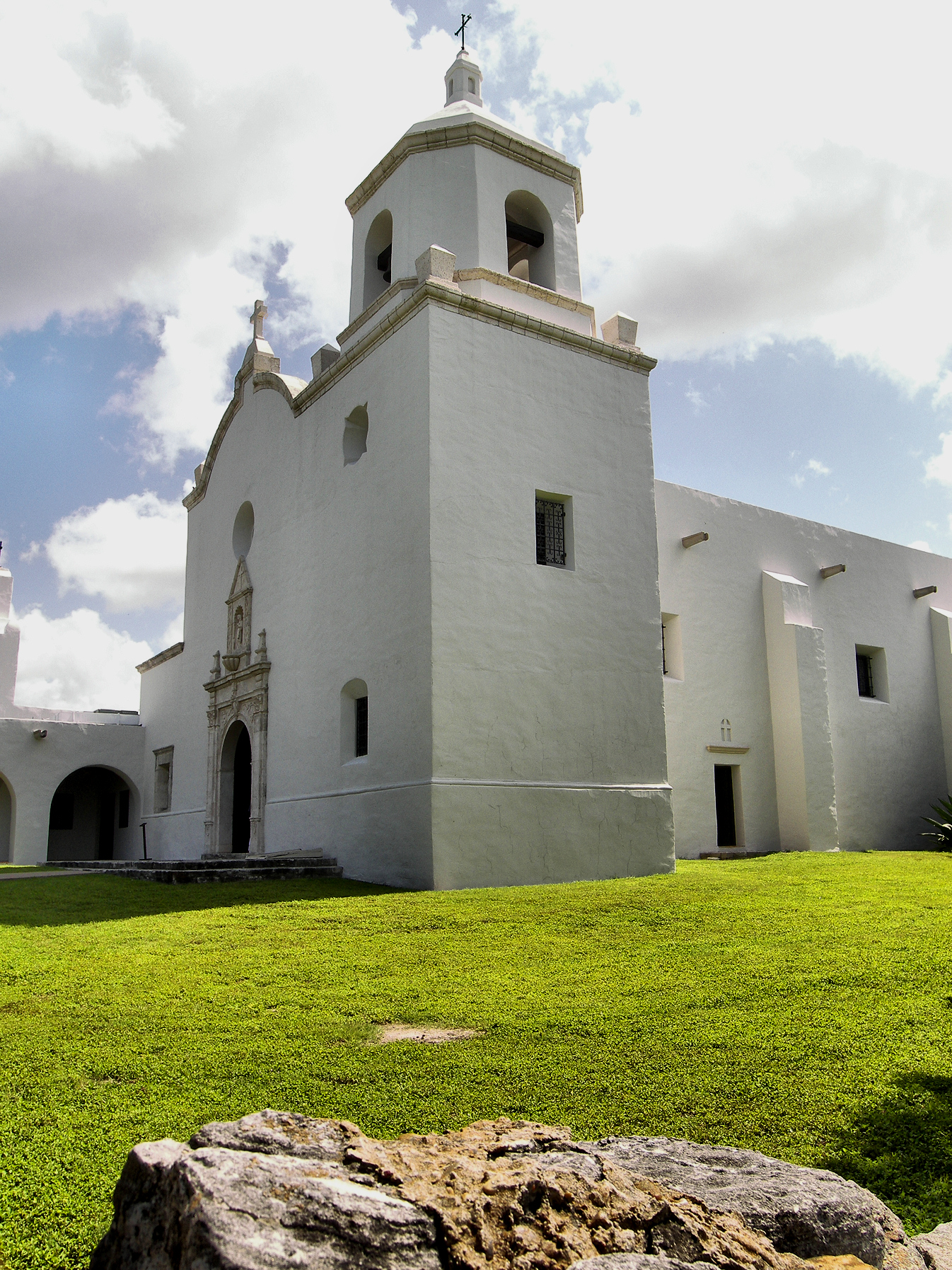
- The chapel of Mission Nuestra Señora del Espíritu Santo de Zúñiga

- Location within Texas Location within the United States

Religion
- Affiliation: Roman Catholic

Location
- Location: Goliad, Texas; United States
- Coordinates: 28°39′15″N 97°23′07″W

Architecture
- Style: Spanish Colonial
- Established: 1722
- Completed: 1749

Specifications
- Site area: 28 acres (11 ha)
- Materials: stone and mortar

U.S. National Register of Historic Places
- Added to NRHP: August 22, 1977
- NRHP Reference no.: 77001446
- U.S. Historic district – Contributing property
- Designated: March 12, 2001
- Parent listing: Goliad State Park Historic District
- Reference no.: 01000258
- Texas State Antiquities Landmark
- Designated: June 28, 1983
- Reference no.: 8200000287

Mission Nuestra Señora del Espíritu Santo de Zúñiga, also known as Aranama Mission or Mission La Bahía, was a Roman Catholic mission established by Spain in 1722 in the Viceroyalty of New Spain—to convert native Karankawa Indians to Christianity. Together with its nearby military fortress, Presidio La Bahía, the mission upheld Spanish territorial claims in the New World against encroachment from France. The third and final location near Goliad, Texas, is maintained now as part of Goliad State Park and Historic Site.

== Establishment ==
Established in 1722 on Matagorda Bay near La Salle's Fort Saint Louis on Garcitas Creek, the mission and complementing presidio was intended to secure the Texas coastline from the French and to gather the local Cocos, Copanes, and Cujanes. Being unable to attract the Native Americans to stay at the mission and due to violence with the Spanish soldiers, the mission was relocated only four years later, to a more favorable location on the Guadalupe River. Artifacts from this settlement are currently on display at the Museum of the Coastal Bend in Victoria.

Moved in 1726 near Victoria, the mission was established among the Tamique and Aranama Indians in Mission Valley. Dams and stone acequias were built to carry water from the river to the mission. A ranching outpost was also built of mortar and stone at Tonkawa Bank, on the river about 12 miles below. The presidio also followed and was built at what was later to become Fernando De León's Ranch. The establishment prospered for 26 years, producing enough grain and hay to trade with other Spanish settlements. It was at this time that the foundation for cattle and horse ranching started. Although prosperous, Spanish officials recommended moving the mission to secure the area between Béxar and East Texas from the encroachment of the French and English.

== Relocation to Goliad ==
Mission La Bahía moved in 1749 to what is now Goliad, Texas on the San Antonio River. Temporary "jacales" housing was built from log and clay (waddle and daub), with construction of stone and mortar outer defensive walls and interior buildings initiated—but not reaching completion until 1758. The mission facilities inside the surrounding stone walls included rooms to house the priests and the Indian families, a granary, workrooms, and a separately located forge. Just across the river, the complementing fortress Presidio La Bahía was built. The mission found success educating and serving the tribes Aranama, Piguique, Manos de Perro, Tamique, Tawakoni, and Tonkawa the area, but by the early 1830s was facing opposition from raiding Apaches and Comanches.

The mission became the first large cattle ranch in Texas, with near 40,000 free-roaming cattle at the height of production in about 1778. The large herds of Texas longhorns and mustangs were cared for by the vaquero Indians from the mission. The mission inhabitants also grew large crops of grain, fruit, and vegetables to support themselves and for trade with others. Cattle and livestock were also driven to and traded with the other missions in east Texas and western Louisiana.

== Closing and restoration ==
The mission was to be secularized in 1794, but La Bahía remained in service until Mexican independence in 1821. However, two Franciscans refused to leave and remained as parish priests. In 1830 the mission was finally secularized. With most Indians having already left, the premium lands of the mission were acquired by the local Mexican and American colonists. The mission itself devolved to the City of Goliad. The old mission's stones were also allowed to be removed and used for local construction. The city leased the site between 1848 and 1856, first for a Baptist school and then a Presbyterian school, but the building gradually fell into ruin.

The mission ruins became part of the newly created Goliad State Park in 1931. In 1933, the Civil Works Administration began reconstruction of the stone chapel and granary following drawings from the National Park Service and San Antonio architect Atlee Ayres. Civilian Conservation Corps Company 3822(V), with funds provided by the Works Progress Administration, finished restoring the mission between 1935 and 1941. Additional construction in the 1960s and 1980s brought the mission back its 1749 appearance.

The mission was listed on the National Register of Historic Places on August 22, 1977. The park is currently operated by the Texas Parks and Wildlife Department.

== See also ==
- National Register of Historic Places listings in Goliad County, Texas
- Recorded Texas Historic Landmarks in Goliad County
