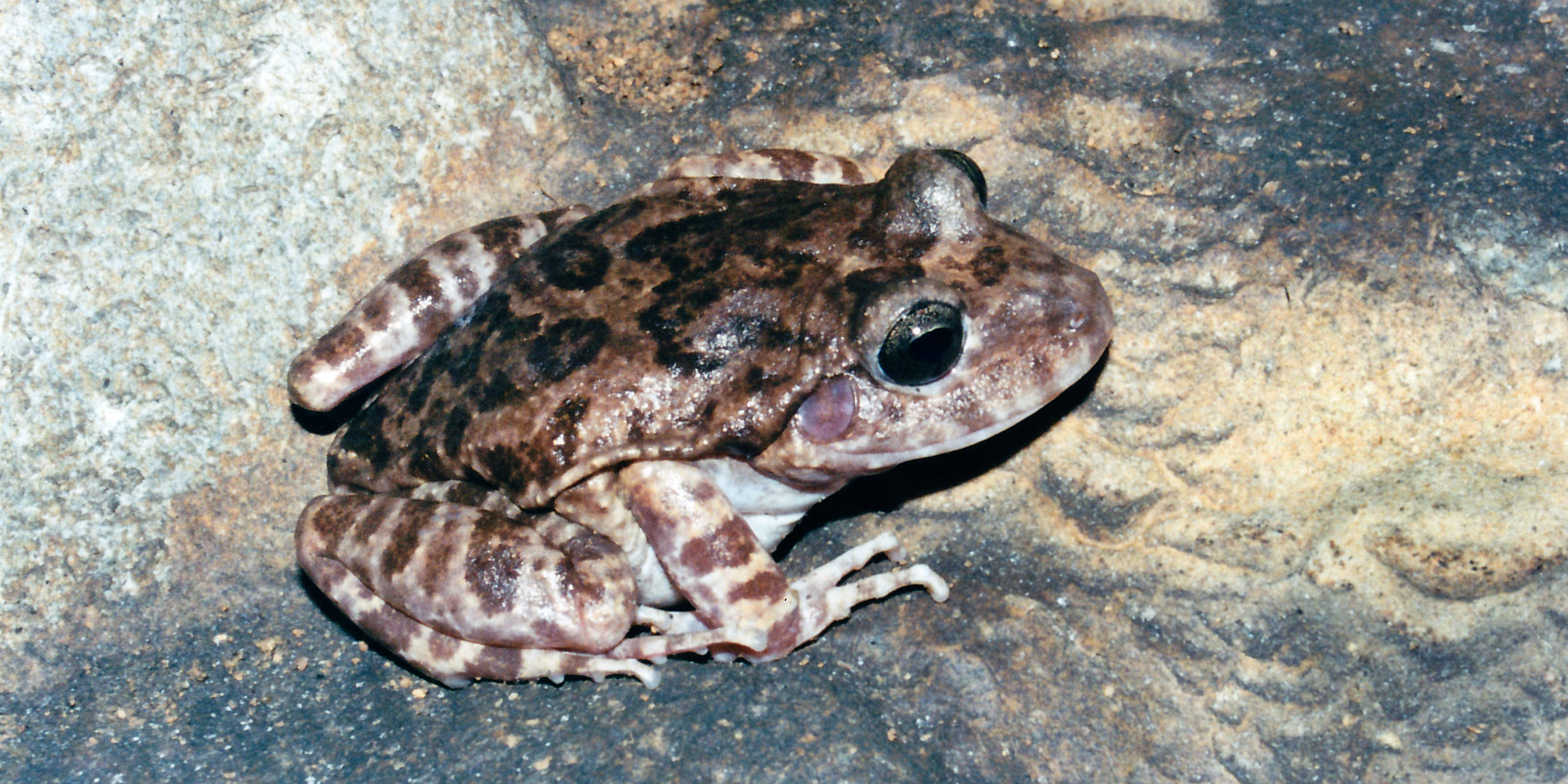
- Barking frog (Craugastor augusti), Municipality of Jaumave, Tamaulipas, Mexico.

Conservation status
- Least Concern (IUCN 3.1)

Scientific classification
- Kingdom: Animalia
- Phylum: Chordata
- Class: Amphibia
- Order: Anura
- Family: Craugastoridae
- Genus: Craugastor
- Species: C. augusti

Binomial name
- Craugastor augusti (Dugès, 1879)

Synonyms
- Lithodytes latrans Cope, 1880; Hylodes augusti Dugès, 1879; Hylactophryne augusti (Dugès, 1879); Eleutherodactylus augusti (Dugès, 1879); Eleutherodactylus latrans (Cope, 1880)

= Craugastor augusti =

Barking frog

Species of amphibian

Craugastor augusti is a species of frog in the family Craugastoridae found in Mexico and the southern United States. It is known by various common names but most commonly as the barking frog (also common robber frog, cliff frog). The nominal species likely includes more than one species, sometimes described as subspecies such as the common barking frog (Craugastor augusti augusti), western barking frog (Craugastor augusti cactorum), and eastern barking frog (Craugastor augusti latrans). The epithet augusti is in honor of renowned French zoologist Auguste Duméril.

It is called the barking frog because its call sounds like the barking of a small dog, although vocalizations vary by area. It is an abundant species in Mexico but apparently rare in the United States. However, they are very difficult to detect unless they are calling, which only occurs during few nights after rains.

== Description ==
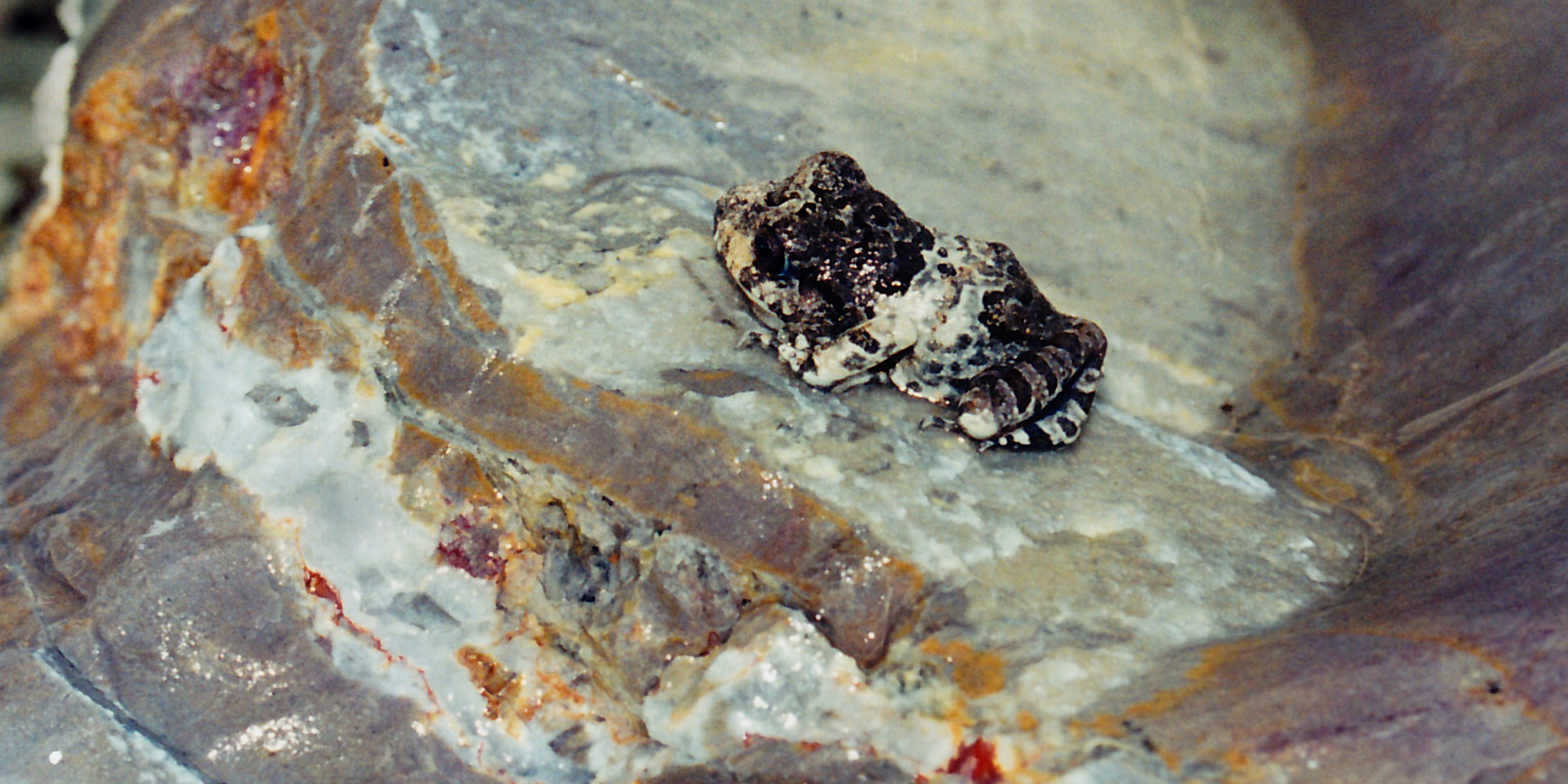
Barking Frog, Tamaulipas (Craugastor augusti), juvenile, Municipality of Gómez Farías, Tamaulipas, Mexico (9 August 2004).

Adult Craugastor augusti measure 47–94 mm (1.9–3.7 in). They have a characteristic fold of skin across the back of the head as well as well-developed tubercles on their feet. Colouration is sexually dimorphic.

== Habitat and life cycle ==
The natural habitats of Craugastor augusti are shrublands and deserts. It is a terrestrial frog that hides under rocks, in caves, or crevices. Eggs are laid in similar microhabitats and develop directly to small froglets, without the free-living tadpole stage. They are known to live for up to seven years in the wild, at least, and 11 years in captivity.
