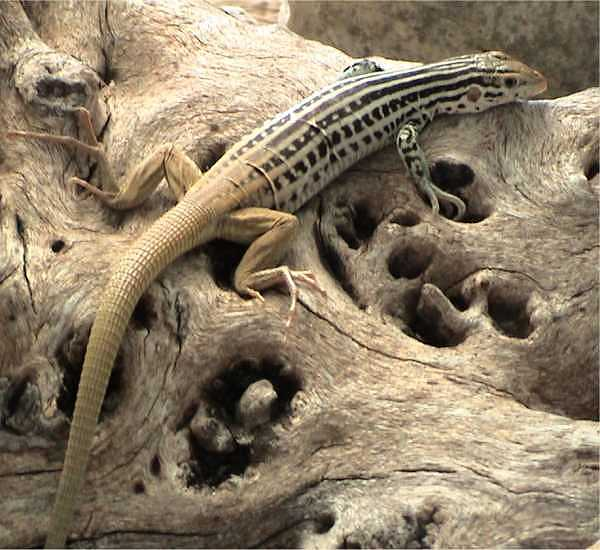

Scientific classification
- Domain: Eukaryota
- Kingdom: Animalia
- Phylum: Chordata
- Class: Reptilia
- Order: Squamata
- Family: Teiidae
- Genus: Aspidoscelis
- Species: A. inornatus
- Subspecies: A. i. heptagrammus

Trinomial name
- Aspidoscelis inornatus heptagrammus (Axtell, 1961)

Synonyms
- Cnemidophorus inornatus heptagrammus Axtell, 1961

= Trans-Pecos striped whiptail =

Subspecies of lizard

The Trans-Pecos striped whiptail (Aspidoscelis inornatus heptagrammus) is a subspecies of the little striped whiptail (Aspidoscelis inornatus) lizard. It is found in the semiarid, sandy habitats of the Chihuahuan Desert, in the United States from West Texas across southern New Mexico to Arizona, as well as northern Mexico. It is sometimes referred to as the Arizona striped whiptail or seven-striped whiptail.

== Description ==
The Trans-Pecos spotted whiptail is gray or black in color, with six to eight yellow or white stripes which run along the body from head to tail. Unlike other species of whiptail lizards, they have no spotting between their stripes. Their undersides are white or pale blue in color, and often they have light blue on the sides of their heads and tails. They are thin-bodied, and have a tail that is typically almost three times the length of their bodies.

== Behavior ==
Like most species of whiptail lizard, Trans-Pecos spotted whiptails are diurnal and insectivorous.
