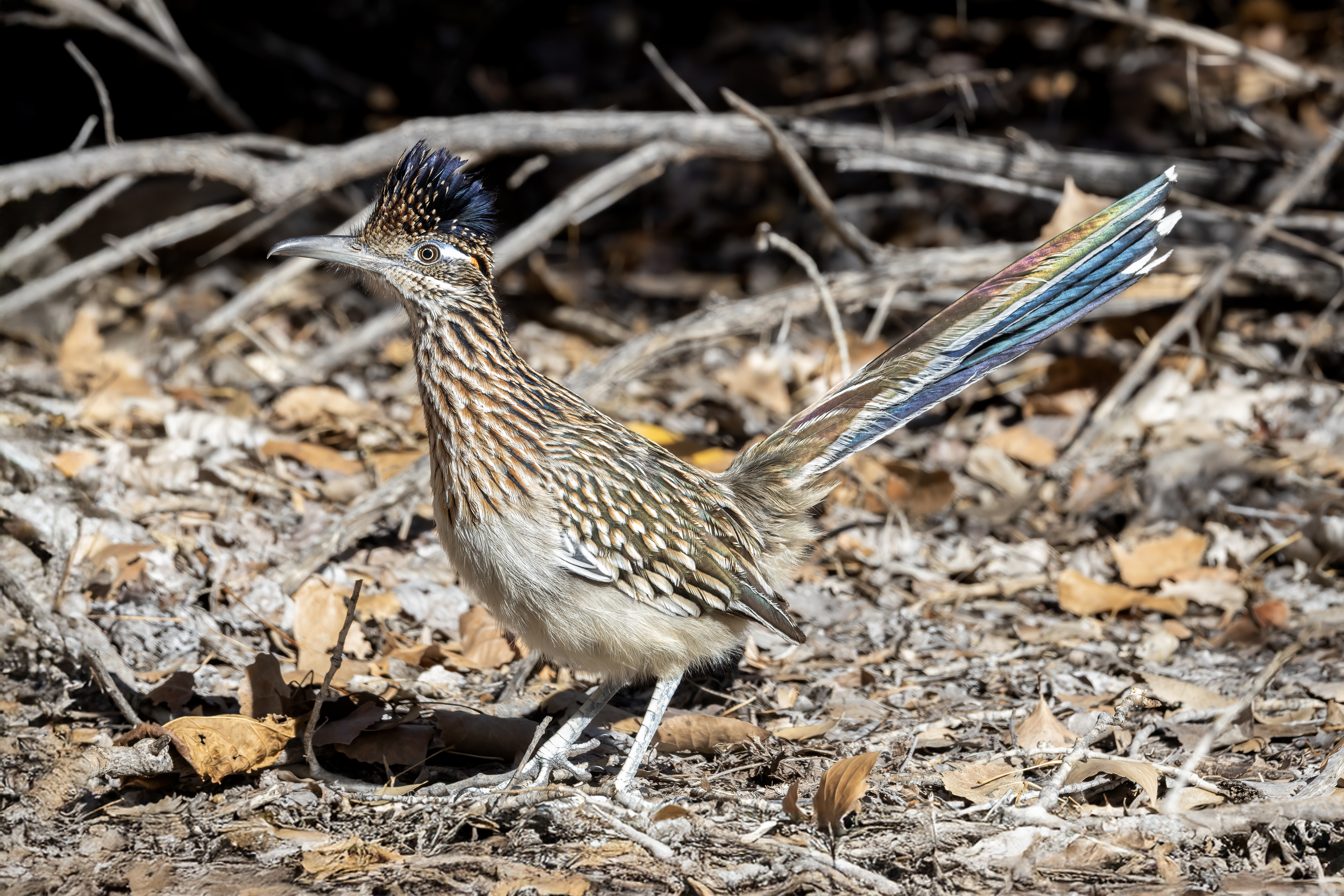

Conservation status
- Least Concern (IUCN 3.1)

- Secure (NatureServe)

Scientific classification
- Kingdom: Animalia
- Phylum: Chordata
- Class: Aves
- Order: Cuculiformes
- Family: Cuculidae
- Genus: Geococcyx
- Species: G. californianus

Binomial name
- Geococcyx californianus (Lesson, 1829)
- Range of G. californianus

= Greater roadrunner =

Greater roadrunner Temporal range: Pleistocene – Recent

Species of bird

The greater roadrunner (Geococcyx californianus) is a long-legged bird in the cuckoo family, Cuculidae, from the Aridoamerica region in the Southwestern United States and Mexico. The scientific name means "Californian earth-cuckoo". Along with the lesser roadrunner, it is one of two species in the genus Geococcyx. This roadrunner is also known as the chaparral cock, ground cuckoo, and snake killer.

== Taxonomy and systematics ==
Greater roadrunner fossils dating from the Holocene and Pleistocene have been found in California,Arizona, New Mexico, and Texas, in the United States, and the Mexican state of Nuevo León. The oldest known fossil comes from a cave in New Mexico, estimated at an age of 33,500 years. In the La Brea Tar Pits, fragments from 25 greater roadrunner fossils have been found. Several other fossils are also known from Santa Barbara and Kern Counties, as well as Northern Mexico.

Prehistoric remains indicate that until 8,000 years ago, the greater roadrunner was found in sparse forests rather than scrubby deserts; only later did it adapt to arid environments. Due to this, along with human transformation of the landscape, it has recently started to move northeast of its normal distribution. Sparse forests can be found in these parts, in an environment similar to the prehistoric North American Southwest.

== Description ==
The greater roadrunner is about 52–62 cm (20–24 in) long, has a 43–61 cm (17–24 in) wingspan, and weighs 221–538 g (7.8–19.0 oz). It stands around 25–30 cm (9 3/4–11 3/4 in) tall and is the largest cuckoo of the Americas. The upper body is mostly brown with black streaks and sometimes pink spots. The neck and upper breast are white or pale brown with dark brown streaks, and the belly is white. A crest of brown feathers sticks up on the head, and a bare patch of orange and blue skin lies behind each eye; the blue is replaced by white in adult males (except the blue adjacent to the eye), and the orange (to the rear) is often hidden by feathers. Males and females have identical plumage. Females are slightly smaller, on average 2 cm (3/4 in) shorter and 30 g (1.1 oz) lighter than males. The long, stout beak is grayish brown to gray and has a hooked tip. Roadrunners have four toes on each zygodactyl foot; two face forward, and two face backward. The toes are brown in color and have pale gold spots.

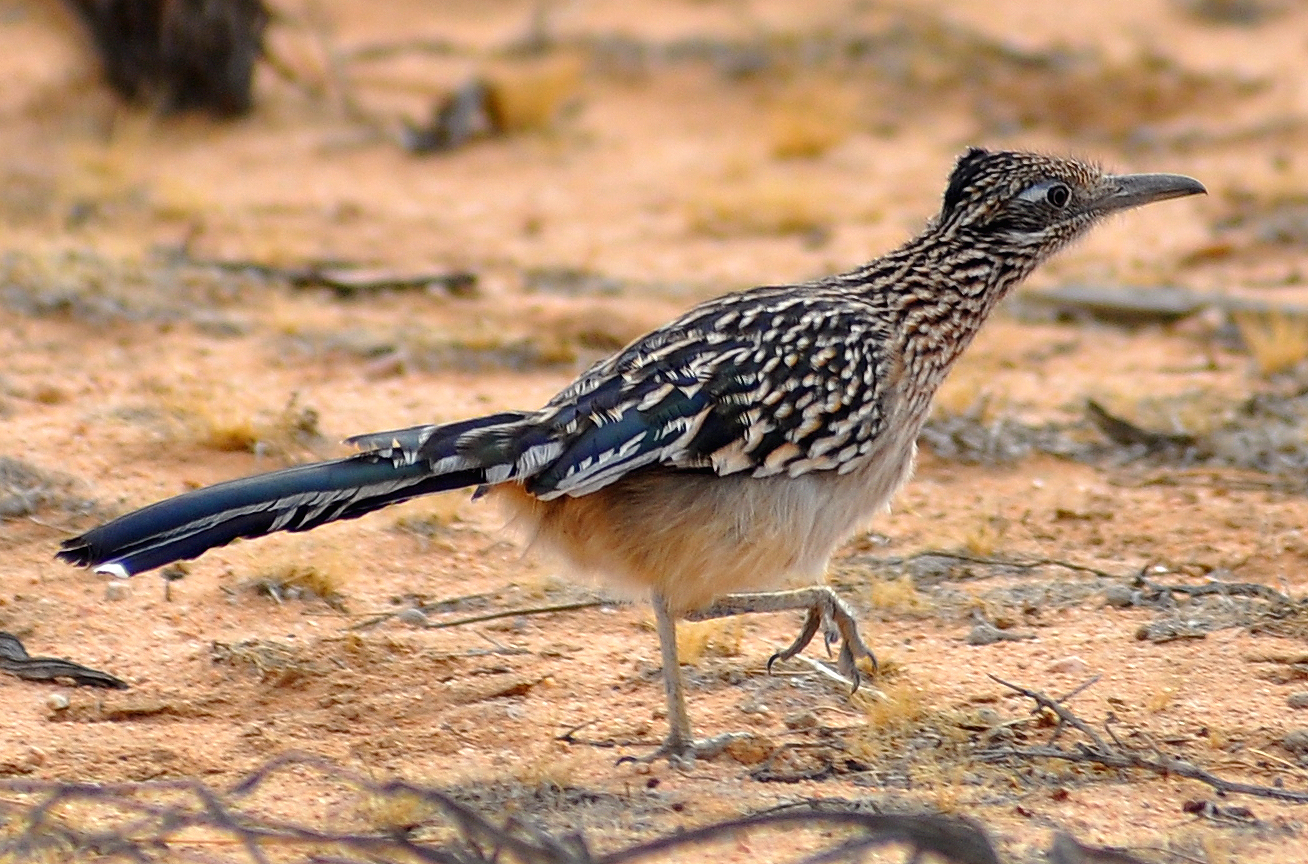
Greater roadrunner walking in the Mojave Desert, California

Although capable of limited flight, it spends most of its time on the ground, and can run at speeds up to 20 mph (32 km/h). Cases where roadrunners have run as fast as 26 mph (42 km/h) have been reported. This is the fastest running speed clocked for a flying bird, but not nearly as fast as the 40 mph (60 km/h) of the completely flightless and much larger ostrich.

=== Vocalizations ===
Chattering

The vocalizations of the greater roadrunner have seven distinct variants. The most frequent call is a slow and descending sequence of about six low, "cooing" noises, emitted by the male and which is heard at 820 ft (250 m). This call is usually made early in the morning, from a high perch such as a fence post, dead tree, or cactus. Females give off up to 22 short, low-frequency shrills, resembling coyote squeals, which can be heard 1,000 ft (300 m) away. Both male and female roadrunners emit a series of five or six chatters accompanied by groaning, loud enough to be heard 700 ft (200 m) away. This sound is the roadrunner's most common vocalization during the incubation period and the rearing of chicks.

== Distribution and habitat ==
The greater roadrunner is found in the Aridoamerica ecoregion, within the Southwestern United States and northern Mexico. It can be seen regularly in the US states of California, Texas, New Mexico, Arizona, Nevada, Oklahoma, Utah, and a small portion of Colorado, and less frequently in Kansas, Louisiana, Arkansas, and Missouri, as well as the Mexican states of Baja California, Baja California Sur, Sonora, Sinaloa, Chihuahua, Durango, Jalisco, Coahuila, Zacatecas, Aguascalientes, Guanajuato, Michoacán, Querétaro, México, Puebla, Nuevo León, Tamaulipas, and San Luis Potosí. The species is not migratory.

The greater roadrunner can be found from 200 ft (61 m) below sea level to 7,500 ft (2,300 m), but rarely above 9,800 ft (3,000 m). It occupies arid and semiarid scrubland, with scattered vegetation (typically less than 50% cover) with a height less than 3.0 m (9 ft 10 in).

== Behavior ==
=== Breeding and nesting ===
Vocalizing while sunbathing in early morning

Until a mate is found, greater roadrunners typically live a solitary life. They are monogamous, forming long-term pair bonds. Breeding season begins from mid-March to early September. Courtship behaviors between greater roadrunners are a lengthy process including a combination of chasing, tail wagging, play-fighting, and acoustic signals. Once the chasing stage has passed, the male presents nesting materials or food to the females.

Often, males offer food to females during the act of copulation. A unique feature of the greater roadrunner is that mated couples continue their copulation rituals long after the need for egg fertilization. This factor is believed to contribute to the couple's pair-bond maintenance. Greater roadrunner couples defend a territory of about 7,500 to 8,600 ft^{2} (700 to 800 m^{2}) in size. The male is more territorial, vocalizing to warn competitors, and does not hesitate to physically push the intruders out of his territory. Some couples defend the same territory all year long.

Both birds build the nest, with the male collecting the material and the female constructing the nest. The nests are compact platforms of thorny branches lined with grasses, feathers, snakeskin, roots, and other fine material. They are built low in a cactus, bush, or man-made structure, 3–10 feet above ground. Greater roadrunners lay three to six eggs, which hatch in 20 days. The chicks fledge in another 18 days. Pairs may occasionally rear a second brood when food is abundant in rainy summers. A young fledge typically remains with its parents until it is at least 50 days old.

Similarly to some other cuckoos, greater roadrunners occasionally lay their eggs in the nests of other birds, such as the common raven and northern mockingbird.

=== Predators ===
The primary predators of this species include ground predators (coyotes, bobcats, lynxes and cougars) and aerial predators (Cooper's hawks and red-tailed hawks).

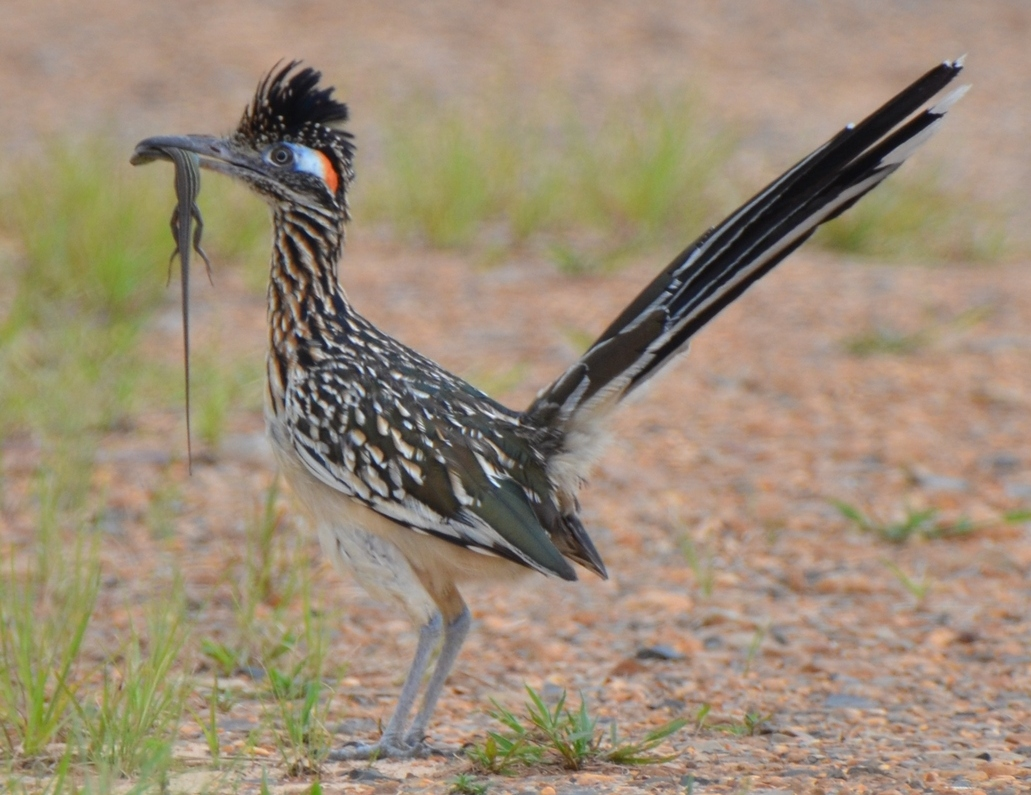
With a six-lined racerunner

=== Feeding ===
The greater roadrunner is omnivorous and uses its speed to outrun and catch prey. It feeds mainly on small animals, such as insects, spiders (including black widows and tarantulas), centipedes, scorpions, mice, small birds (including hummingbirds), lizards and young rattlesnakes, and some plants. Some instances of the greater roadrunner feeding on the dead carcasses of larger mammals (including bats, ground squirrels, and one juvenile desert cottontail) have been observed. They are opportunistic and are known to feed on eggs and young of other birds as well as carrion.

=== Thermoregulation ===
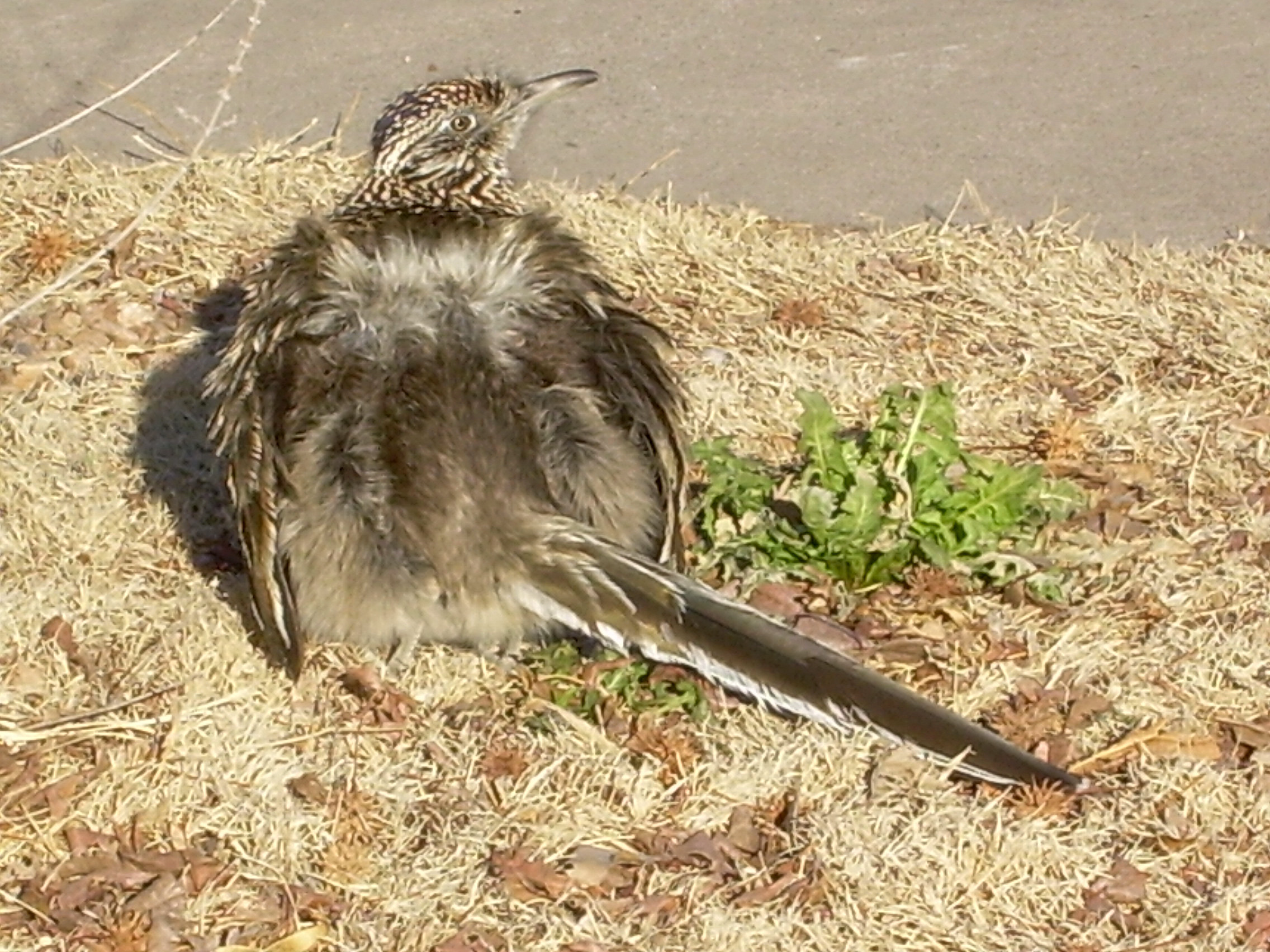
A greater roadrunner sunbathing

Because of the greater roadrunner's diurnal nature and arid habitat, it has various biological and behavioral adaptations, known as thermoregulation, to reduce dehydration and overheating. During the hot season, it is active mostly from sunrise to mid-morning, and late afternoon to evening. It rests in the shade during the hottest part of the day. Body water may be retained via liquid reabsorption, by the mucous membranes in the cloaca, rectum and caecum. The roadrunner's nasal glands eliminate excess body salts.

The greater roadrunner reduces excess heat by the formation of water vapor, released by breathing or through the skin. It sometimes pants in heavy heat to accelerate this action. At night, it reduces its energy expenditure by more than 30%, lowering its body temperature from 104 to 93 °F (40 to 34 °C). In the morning, it accelerates heat recovery by sunbathing. In winter, it takes refuge in dense vegetation or among rocks to shelter from cold winds. The roadrunner frequently sunbathes by turning perpendicular to the ground with its back turned towards the sun. Wings apart, the roadrunner ruffles the black feathers on its back and head, exposing its black skin, allowing both skin and feathers to absorb the heat of the sun's rays. Early in the morning, it can stay in this posture for two or three hours. In winter, when the temperatures are around 68 °F (20 °C), roadrunners may warm themselves in the sun several times during the day for more than half an hour at a time.

=== Locomotion ===
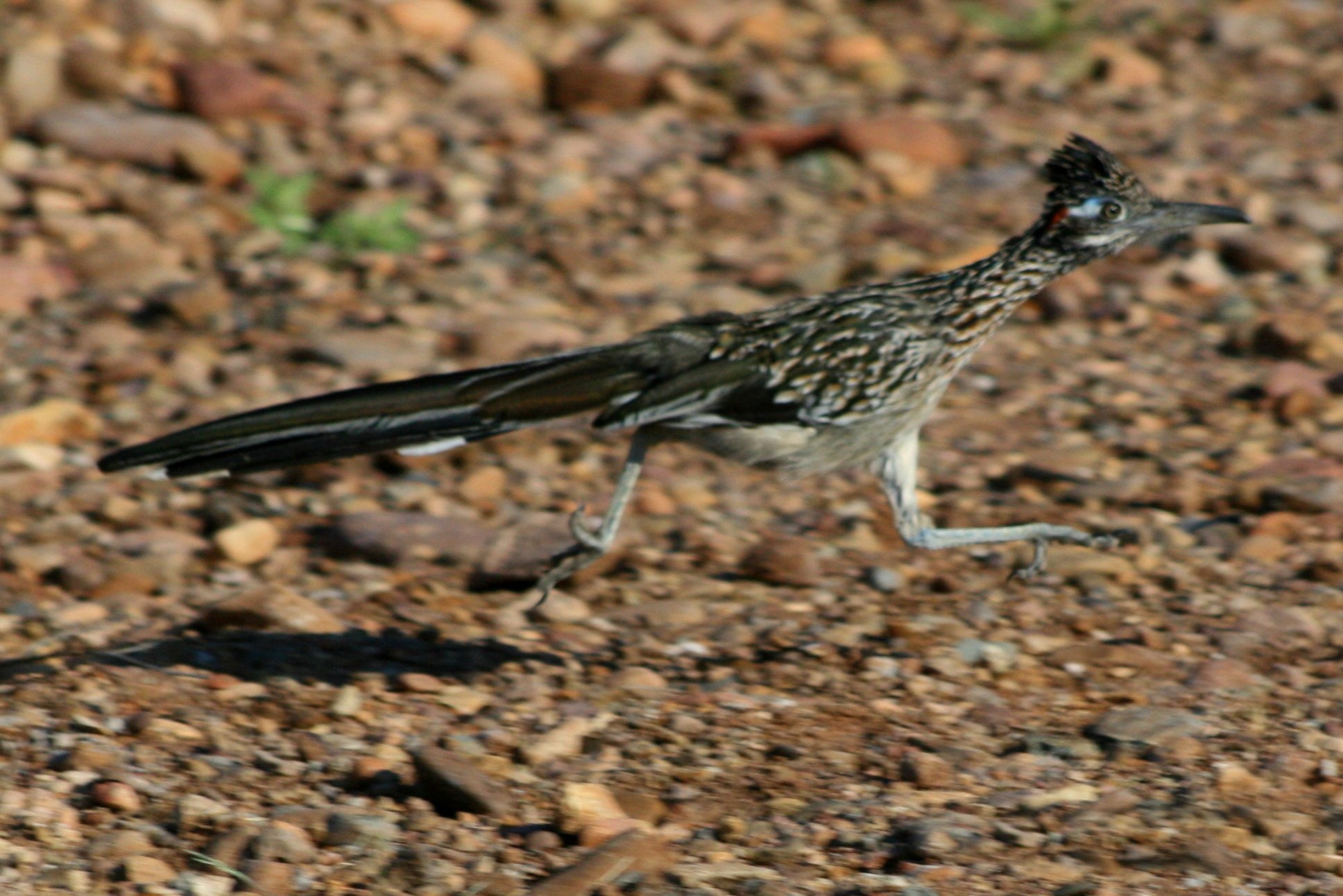
Greater roadrunner on the run

The greater roadrunner can maintain a speed of 18–20 mph (29–32 km/h) over long distances. While running, it places its head and tail parallel to the ground and uses its tail as a rudder to help change its direction. It prefers to run in open areas, such as roads, packed trails, and dry riverbeds rather than dense vegetation. The roadrunner less often engages in flight. It hovers from a perch, such as a tree or a human construction. More rarely, it flies short distances of 4 or 5 m (13 or 16 ft) between potential roosts.

== Relationship to humans ==
Some Pueblo Native American tribes, including the Hopi, believed the roadrunner provided protection against evil spirits. In Mexico, some said it brought babies, as the white stork was said to in Europe. Some Anglo frontier people believed roadrunners led lost people to trails.

Wile E. Coyote and the Road Runner are the two main characters and protagonists of a long-running (since 1949) Warner Bros. animated series.

The greater roadrunner is the state bird of New Mexico, and as such, appeared in a 1982 sheet of 20-cent United States stamps showing 50 state birds and flowers.

It is also the mascot of numerous high schools and colleges in the United States, including California State University, Bakersfield and the University of Texas at San Antonio. The College of DuPage mascot takes the bird's alternate name, Chaparral, inspired by students driving between various temporary classroom locations before the main campus was fully constructed; Lubbock Christian University also uses that name. The roadrunner is also the mascot of the Tucson Roadrunners, a professional hockey team in Tucson, Arizona.

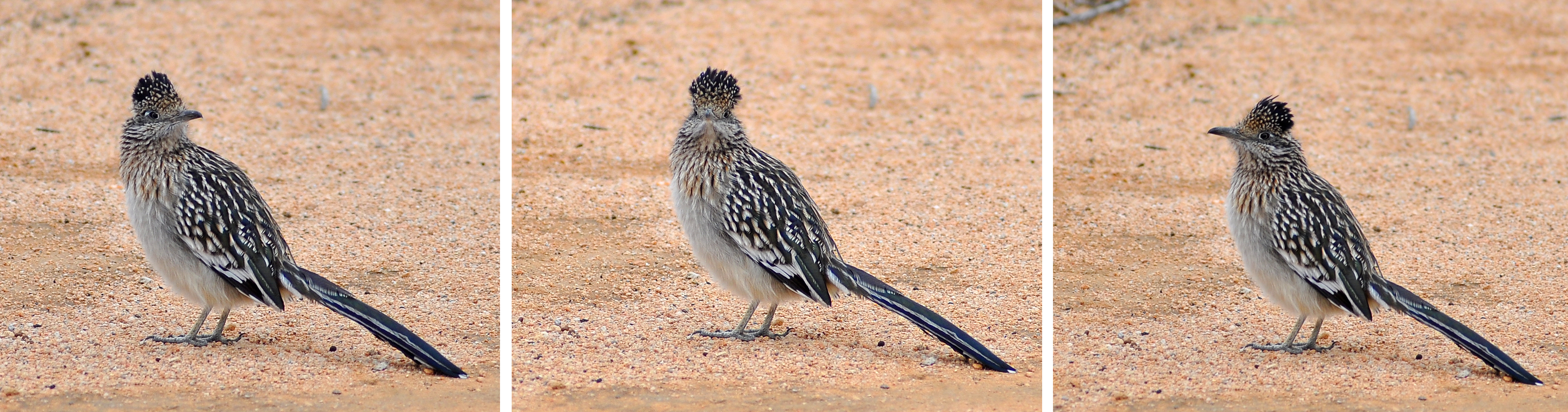
Three views of the same individual
