= Aranama people =

Extinct North American Indigenous people

Aranama
- Map of Aranama territory circa 1500 CE

Total population
- extinct (1843)

Regions with significant populations
- Texas, Aridoamerica

Languages
- Aranama language

Religion
- Indigenous religion

Related ethnic groups
- Coahuiltecans

The Aranama were an Indigenous people who lived along the San Antonio and Guadalupe rivers of present-day Texas, near the Gulf Coast.

== Language ==
Aranama people spoke the Aranama language, a poorly attested language that went extinct in the mid-19th century. It may have been a Coahuiltecan language but remains unclassified.

== History ==
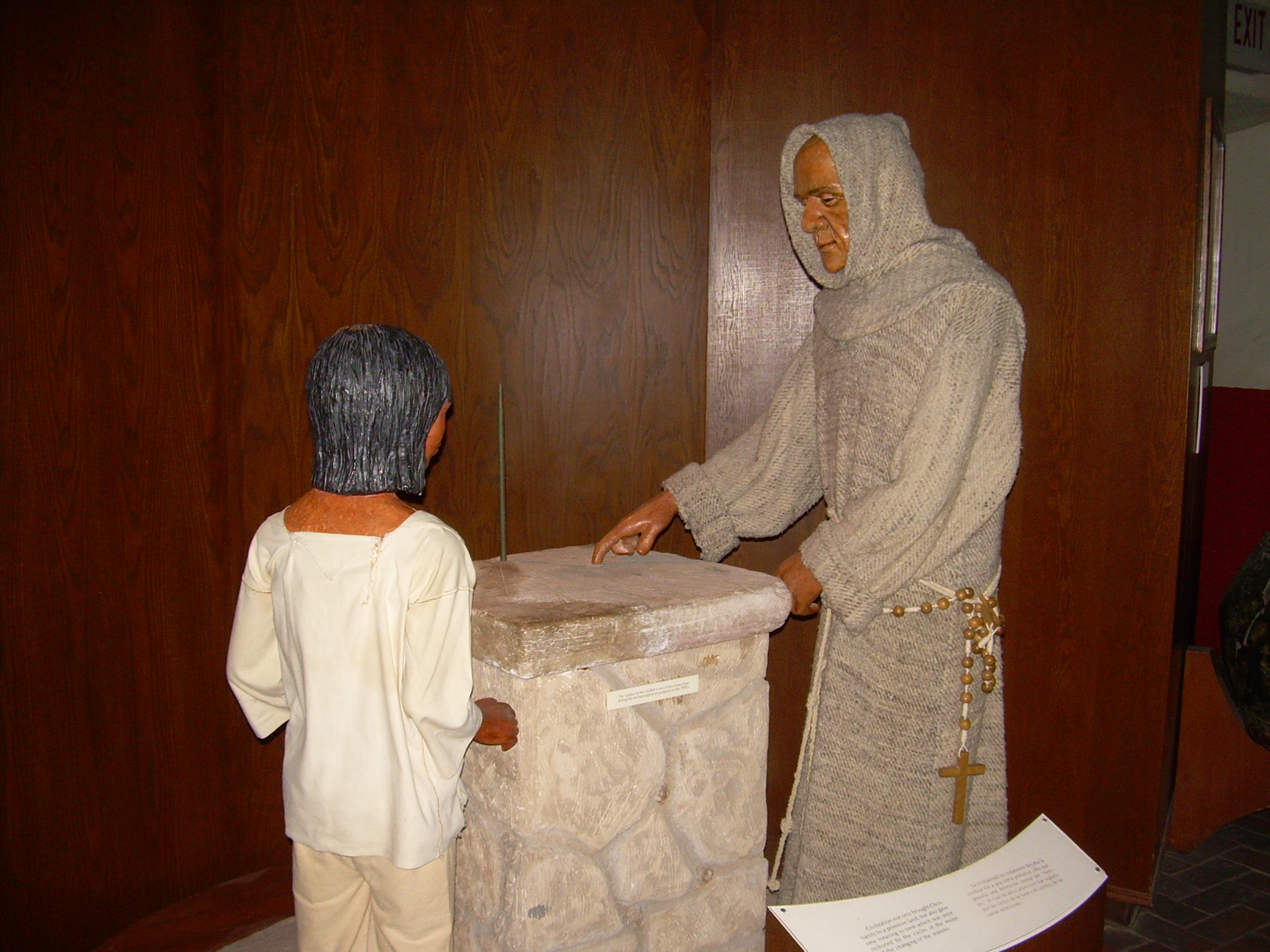
Mannequin of a Spanish priest and an Indigenous man in Mission Nuestra Señora del Espíritu Santo de Zúñiga

Many Aranama people moved to Mission Nuestra Señora del Espíritu Santo de Zúñiga at its second and third locations. Several times, they left the mission to move north, and occasionally joined the Tawakonis. Each time, the Spanish colonists convinced them to return.

Some Aranama people also joined San Antonio de Valero in San Antonio and Nuestra Señora del Refugio in Refugio.
