= Aranama language =

Extinct language of Texas, United States

Aranama
- Tamique, Hanáma
- Native to: United States
- Region: Texas
- Ethnicity: Aranama, Tamique
- Extinct: late 19th century
- Language family: unclassified

Language codes
- ISO 639-3: xrt
- Glottolog: aran1265
- Pre-contact distribution of the Aranama language

Aranama – also known as Araname, Haname, or Tamique – is an extinct unclassified language of Texas, US. It was spoken by the Aranama and Tamique peoples at the Franciscan mission of Espíritu Santo de Zúñiga. It is only known from a two-word phrase from a non-native speaker: himiána tsáyi 'give me water!'. Variations on the name are Taranames, Jaranames ~ Xaranames ~ Charinames, Chaimamé, Hanáma ~ Hanáme.

== Vocabulary ==
In 1884, Albert Gatschet recorded one word and a two-word phrase from "Old Simon," a Tonkawa man who also served as an informant for the Karankawa language, of which a short vocabulary was recorded. According to Old Simon, the words were from a language that he referred to as "Hanáma" (or "Háname"):

- himiyána 'water'
- himiaʹna tsaʹyi 'Give me water!'

=== Lexical comparison ===
Below is a comparison of words from selected nearby languages in Zamponi (2024):

| language | Aranama | Coahuilteco | Solano | Tonkawa | W. Atakapa | Karankawa | Cotoname | Comecrudo |
|---|---|---|---|---|---|---|---|---|
| 'give me' | tsaʹyi | -a·xa | sieh | k-e·ke-w | hiʹ-mic | baHúšb (Note: H stands for the unclear and putative value of <h> in French and Spanish sources.) | | ayemaʹ 'give' |
| 'water' | himiyaʹna | wan | apam | ʔa·x | ka(u)ʹkau | klej | aʹx̣ | aʹx̣ |

== See also ==
- Amotomanco language
- Solano language
- Tanpachoa language
