= Confluent rattlesnake =

Confluent rattlesnake may refer to:

- Crotalus oreganus, a.k.a. the western rattlesnake, a venomous pit viper species found in North America in the western United States, parts of British Columbia and northwestern Mexico.
- Crotalus viridis, a.k.a. the prairie rattlesnake, a venomous pit viper species native to the western United States, southwestern Canada, and northern Mexico.
