= Black rattlesnake =

Black rattlesnake may refer to:

- Crotalus horridus, the timber rattlesnake, a venomous pitviper species found in the eastern United States.
- Crotalus o. oreganus, the western rattlesnake, a venomous pitviper subspecies found in North America from the Pacific slope in British Columbia, Canada, south through the United States to San Luis Obispo and Kern counties in California.
- Crotalus cerberus, the Arizona black rattlesnake, a venomous pitviper subspecies found in the southwestern United States.
