= Black rattler =

Black rattler may refer to:

- Sistrurus catenatus, also known as the massasauga, a venomous pitviper species found primarily in the United States.
- Crotalus helleri, also known as the Southern Pacific rattlesnake, a venomous pitviper species found in South-West California and south into Baja California.
- Crotalus viridis, also known as the prairie rattlesnake, a venomous pitviper species native to the western United States, southwestern Canada,
