= Missouri rattlesnake =

Missouri rattlesnake may refer to:

- Crotalus oreganus, a.k.a. the western rattlesnake, a venomous pitviper species found in North America in the western United States, parts of British Columbia and northwestern Mexico
- Crotalus viridis, a.k.a. the prairie rattlesnake, a venomous pitviper species native to the western United States, southwestern Canada, and northern Mexico
