= Yellow rattlesnake =

Yellow rattlesnake may refer to:

- Timber rattlesnake or Crotalus horridus, a pitviper species found in the eastern United States
- Crotalus concolor or midget faded rattlesnake, a pitviper species found in the western United States
- Eastern diamondback rattlesnake or Crotalus adamanteus, a pitviper species found in the eastern United States
