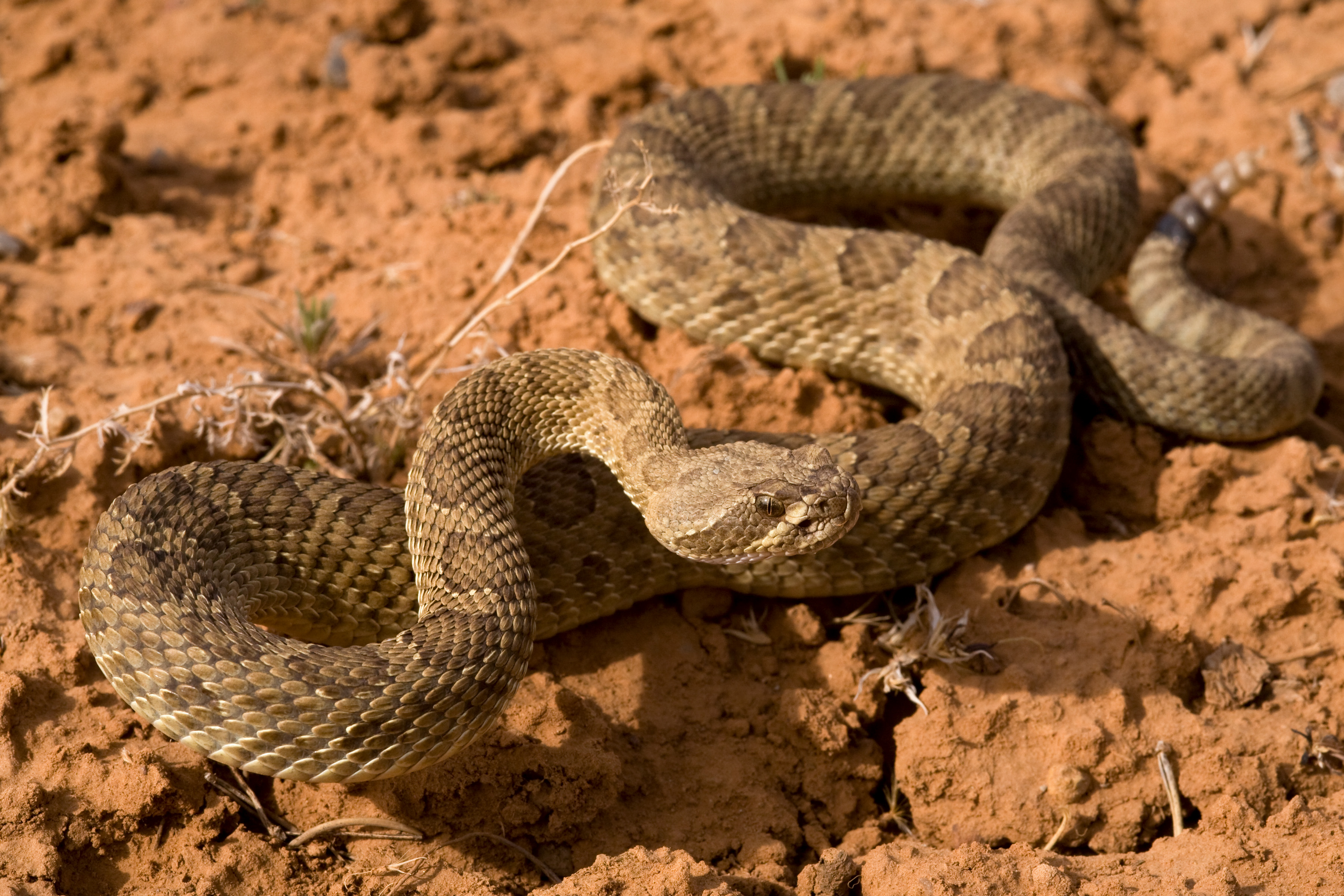
- Prairie rattlesnake, C. v. viridis

Conservation status
- Least Concern (IUCN 3.1)

Scientific classification
- Kingdom: Animalia
- Phylum: Chordata
- Class: Reptilia
- Order: Squamata
- Suborder: Serpentes
- Family: Viperidae
- Genus: Crotalus
- Species: C. viridis

Binomial name
- Crotalus viridis (Rafinesque, 1818)
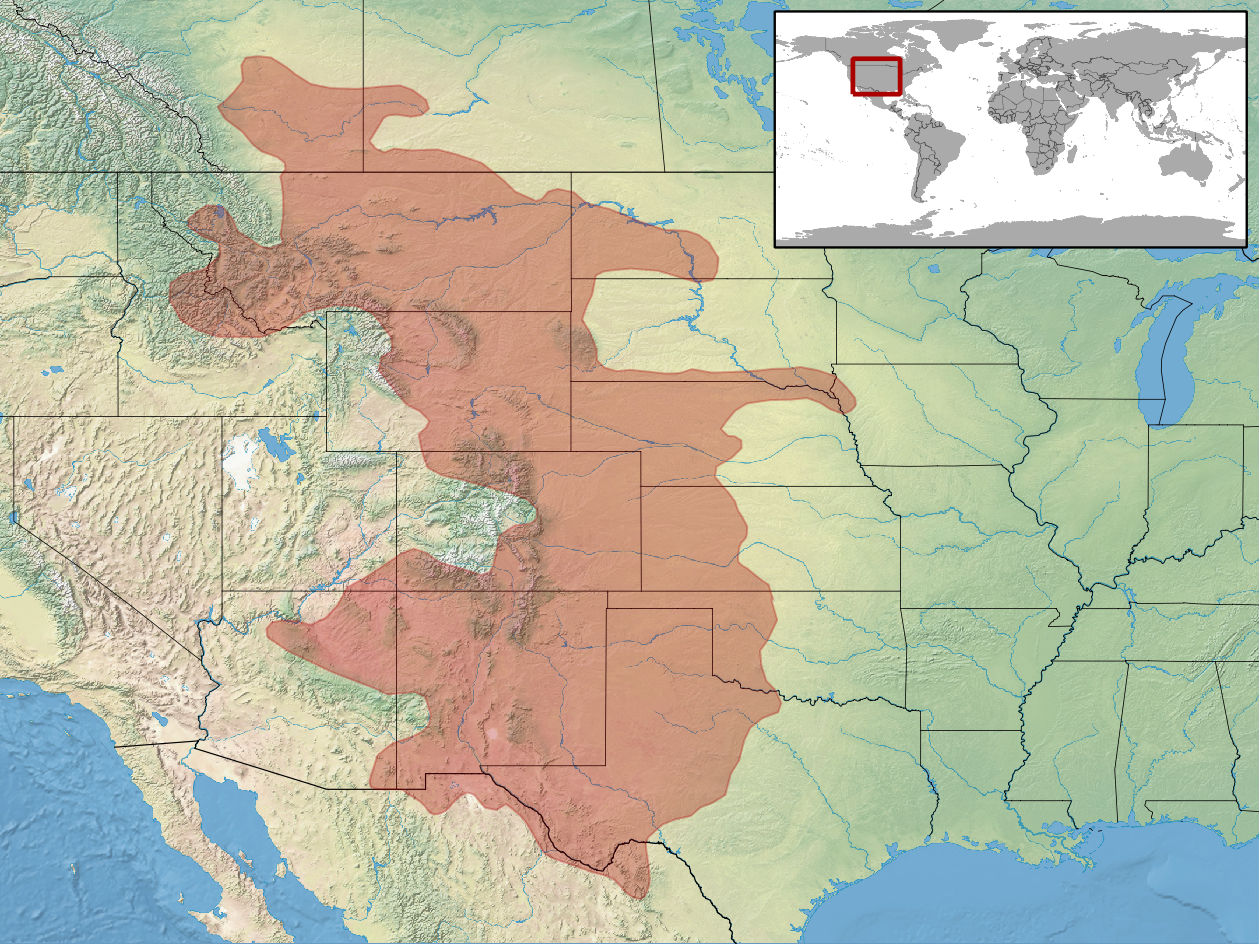

Synonyms
- List: Crotalinus viridis Rafinesque, 1818; Crotalurus viridis — Rafinesque, 1820; Crotalus confluentus Say In James, 1823; Crotalus Lecontei Hallowell, 1852; Crotalus audisona. confluenta — Cope, 1867; Caudisona confluenta Var. confluenta — Cope, 1867; Caudisona confluenta Var. lecontei — Cope, 1867; Crotalus confluentus var. pulverulentus Cope, 1883; Crotalus confluentus var. confluentus — Cope, 1883; Crotalus confluentus confluentus — Cope, 1892; Crotalus confluentus lecontei — Cope, 1892; Crotalus viridis viridis — Klauber, 1936

= Crotalus viridis =

Species of snake

The prairie rattlesnake or Great Plains rattlesnake (Crotalus viridis) is a venomous pit viper species native to the western United States, southwestern Canada, and northern Mexico. Currently, two subspecies are recognized, including the prairie rattlesnake (C. v. viridis), the nominate subspecies, and the Hopi rattlesnake (C. v. nuntius).

== Taxonomy ==
The taxonomic history of this species is convoluted. Previously, seven other C. viridis subspecies were also recognized, including C. v. abyssus, C. v. caliginis, C. v. cerberus, C. v. concolor, C. v. helleri, C. v. lutosus, and C. v. oreganus In 2001, though, Ashton and de Queiroz described their analysis of the variation of mitochondrial DNA across the range of this species. Their results agreed broadly with those obtained by Pook et al. (2000). Two main clades were identified, east and west of the Rocky Mountains, which they argued were actually two different species: C. viridis, including the conventional subspecies C. v. viridis and C. v. nuntius, and C. oreganus, including all the other traditional subspecies of C. viridis. The authors retained the names of the traditional subspecies, but emphasized the need for more work to be done on the systematics of C. oreganus.

== Description ==
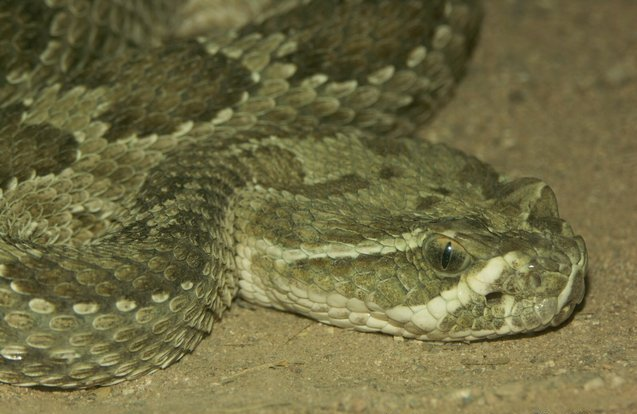
Crotalus viridis, closeup of head

This species commonly grows to more than 100 cm (3.3 ft) in length. The maximum recorded size is 151.5 cm (4.97 ft). In Montana, specimens occasionally exceed 120 cm (3.9 ft) in length; the species reaches its maximum size in this region. One of the most characteristic features is the presence of three or more, usually four, internasal scales.

Identification characteristics vary depending on which subspecies is encountered. Generally, prairie rattlesnakes are usually lightly colored in hues of brown. Patches of dark brown are often distributed in a dorsal pattern. A color band may be seen at the back of the eye. The prairie rattlesnake group carries the distinctive triangle-shaped head and pit sensory organs on either side of the head. A key characteristic that can help differentiate a prairie rattlesnake from other rattlesnakes is the presence of two internasals contacting the rostral.

== Distribution and habitat ==
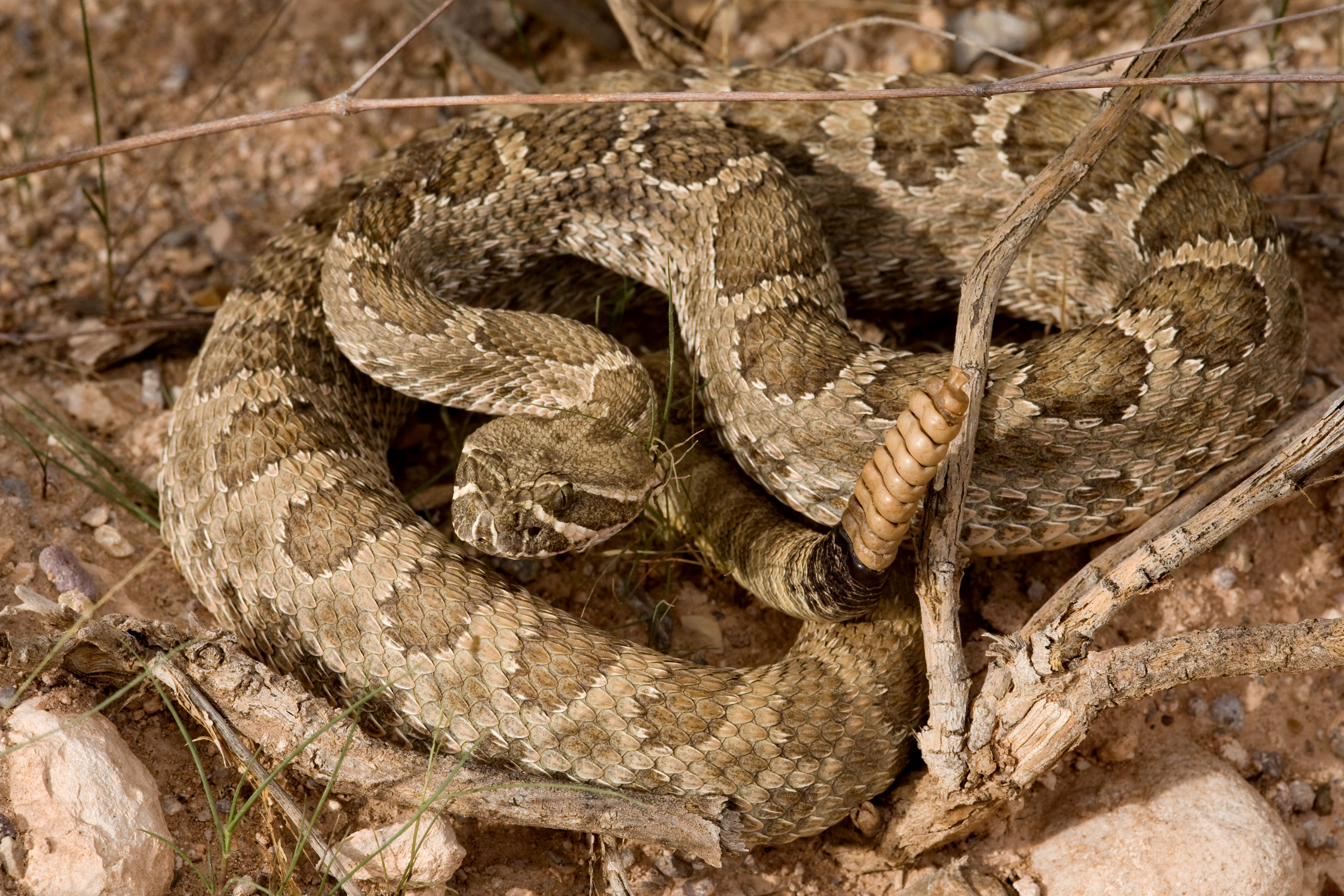
Prairie rattlesnake (C. v. viridis), Hidalgo County, New Mexico (5 Sep 2014)

Prairie rattlesnakes are found in North America over much of the Great Plains, the eastern foothills and some intermontane valleys of the Rocky Mountains, and from southwestern Canada through the United States to northern Mexico. In Canada, they occur in Alberta and Saskatchewan; in the US, they are found in eastern Idaho, most of Montana, North Dakota, South Dakota, Wyoming, Nebraska, Colorado, Kansas, Oklahoma, Texas, New Mexico, northeastern Arizona, and extreme western Iowa, and in Mexico in northern Coahuila and northwestern Chihuahua. Its vertical range is from 100 m (330 ft) near the Rio Grande to over 2,775 m (9,104 ft) in elevation in Wyoming.

Wright and Wright (1957) and Klauber (1997) both mention Utah as within the range of this species, including maps showing it confined to the extreme southeastern part of the state. The type locality is described as "the Upper Missouri [Valley, USA]". An emendation was proposed by H.M. Smith and Taylor (1950) to "Gross, Boyd County, Nebraska."

Habitat characteristics can vary depending on subspecies and range. Generally, western rattlesnakes occupy areas with an abundant prey base. Many subspecies occupy somewhat rocky areas with outcrops serving as den sites. Prairie rattlesnakes have been known to occupy burrows of other animals. They seem to prefer dry areas with moderate vegetation coverage, which varies depending on region and subspecies.

== Behavior ==
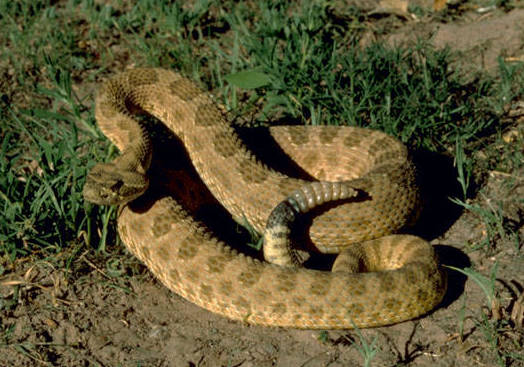
A Hopi rattlesnake (C. v. nuntius) in a defensive posture

Prairie rattlesnakes are primarily terrestrial, but occasionally climb in trees or bushes. Some even rest in crevices or caves. They are typically active diurnally in cooler weather and nocturnally during hot weather. This species complex is equipped with powerful venom, using about 20-55% of venom in one bite, and will defend themselves if threatened or injured. As with other rattlesnake species, prairie rattlesnakes rapidly vibrate their tails, which produces a unique rasping sound (rattle) to warn intruders. Prairie rattlesnakes prefer a straight migration path while migrating even in human-dominated environments because it leads to a higher chance of survival and better body condition throughout and after migration.

The venom of the prairie rattlesnake is a complexly structured mixture of different proteins with enzymes such as proteases and peptidases found among them. Besides the hemotoxin and its tissue-destructive effect, the venom also has neurotoxic properties.

=== Diet ===
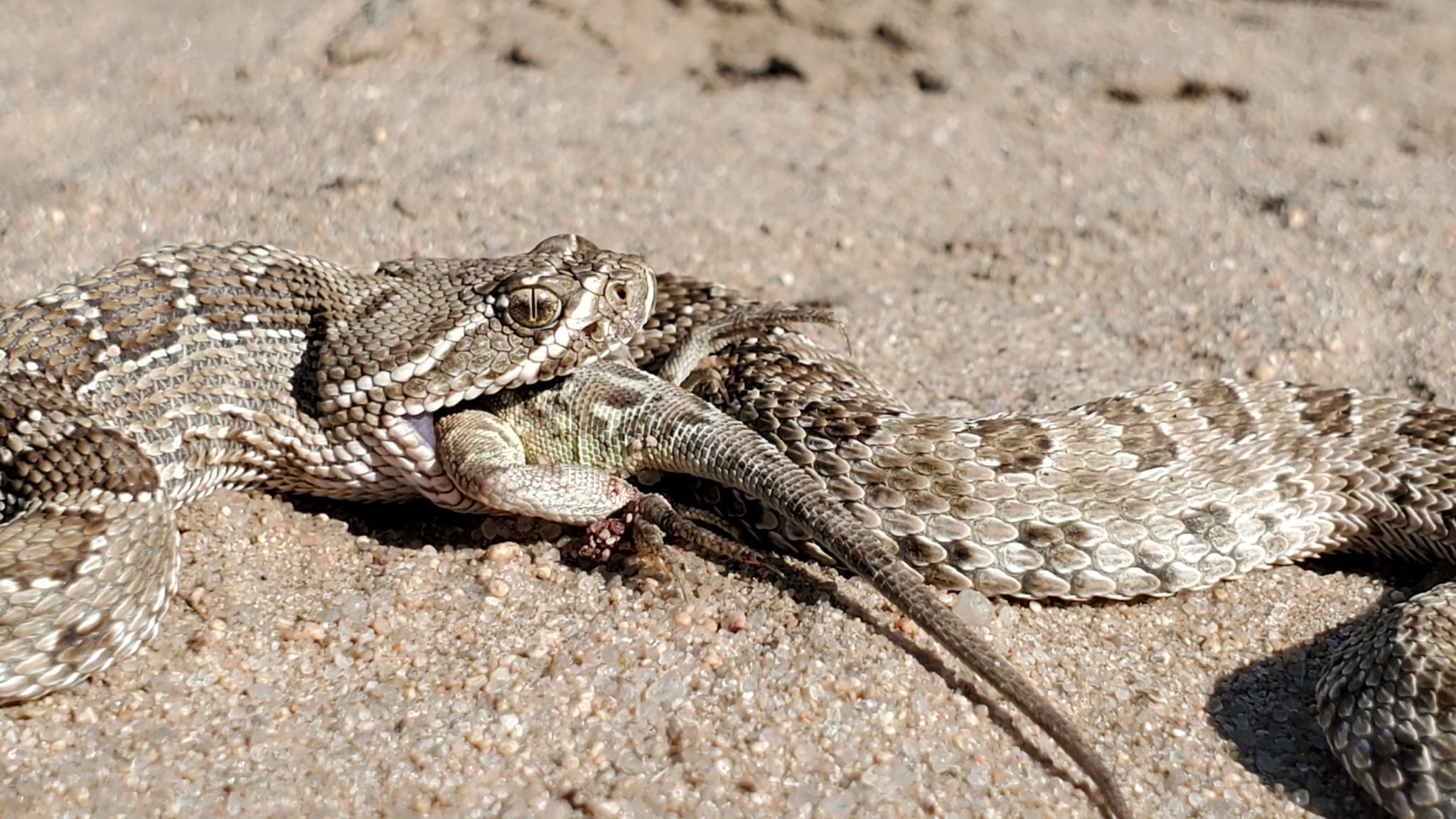
Juvenile feeding on a lesser earless lizard in Colorado

Prairie rattlesnakes, because of their expansive distribution, have a wide array of prey. Generally, this species prefers small mammals, such as ground squirrels, ground-nesting birds, mice, rats, small rabbits, and prairie dogs. They occasionally feed on amphibians and reptiles, and sometimes even other snakes, more commonly seen in juveniles.

=== Reproduction ===
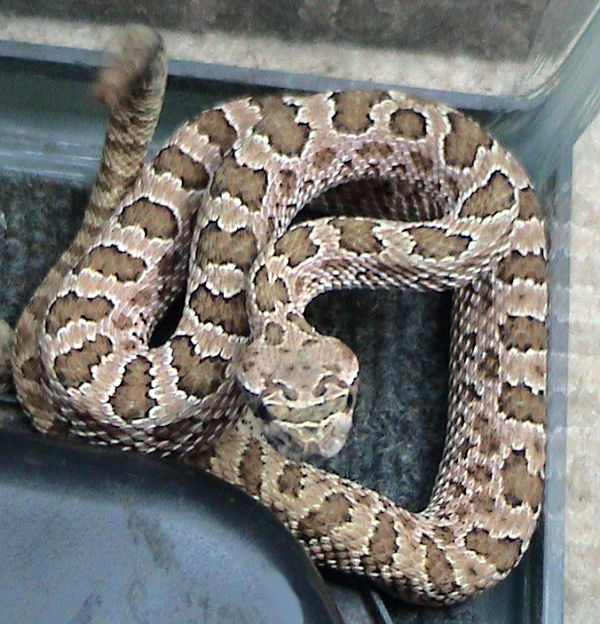
Juvenile Hopi rattlesnake (C. v. nuntius) in captivity

Prairie rattlesnakes are viviparous and produce one to 25 young per reproduction event. The typical number of young ranges from four to 12, but can vary greatly due to availability of food and environmental conditions. Males may compete for females during the breeding season, but western rattlesnake females may not necessarily breed every year. They give birth in late summer or early fall, female rattlesnakes coming together to birth and care for their young in communal dens. Females have been observed "babysitting" unrelated juveniles when their mothers require a break, and engaging in other social behaviors such as drinking rainwater from each other's backs. Snakelets are 22–28 cm long and are toxic as soon as they are born. They reach sexual maturity at 3 years of age.

== Conservation status ==
This species is classified as least concern on the IUCN Red List of Threatened Species (v3.1, 2001). Species are listed as such due to their wide distribution, presumed large population, or because they are unlikely to be declining fast enough to qualify for listing in a more threatened category. The population trend was stable when assessed in 2006.

The state of Iowa lists it as an endangered species, with only a single remnant population in the Loess Hills region. In Canada it is listed as a species of special concern due to steady declines since the 1930s, largely from large-scale habitat loss from cultivation and road mortality.

== Subspecies ==
Crotalus viridis nuntius Klauber, 1935, the Hopi rattlesnake, inhabits the United States from northeastern and north-central Arizona, from the New Mexico border to Cataract Creek, including the Little Colorado River basin, the southern section of the Apache Indian Reservation, the Hopi Reservation, and the Coconino Plateau from the southern rim of the Grand Canyon to US Highway 66 in the south.

Crotalus viridis viridis (Rafinesque, 1818), the prairie rattlesnake, inhabits the North American Great Plains from the Rocky Mountains to 96° W and from southern Canada to extreme northern Mexico, including southwestern Saskatchewan, southeastern Alberta, eastern Washington, Idaho in the Lemhi Valley, Montana east of the higher Rockies, southwestern North Dakota, west, central and extreme southeastern South Dakota, western Iowa, central and western Nebraska, Wyoming except for the Rockies, Colorado, central and western Kansas, Oklahoma, extreme southeastern Utah, northeastern Arizona, New Mexico, western and southwestern Texas, northeastern Sonora, northern Chihuahua, northern Coahuila.

== See also ==
- Snakebite
