= Arizona diamond rattlesnake =

Arizona diamond rattlesnake is a common name that may refer to either of the following species:

- Crotalus atrox, a.k.a. the western diamondback rattlesnake.
- Crotalus oreganus, a.k.a. the western rattlesnake.
