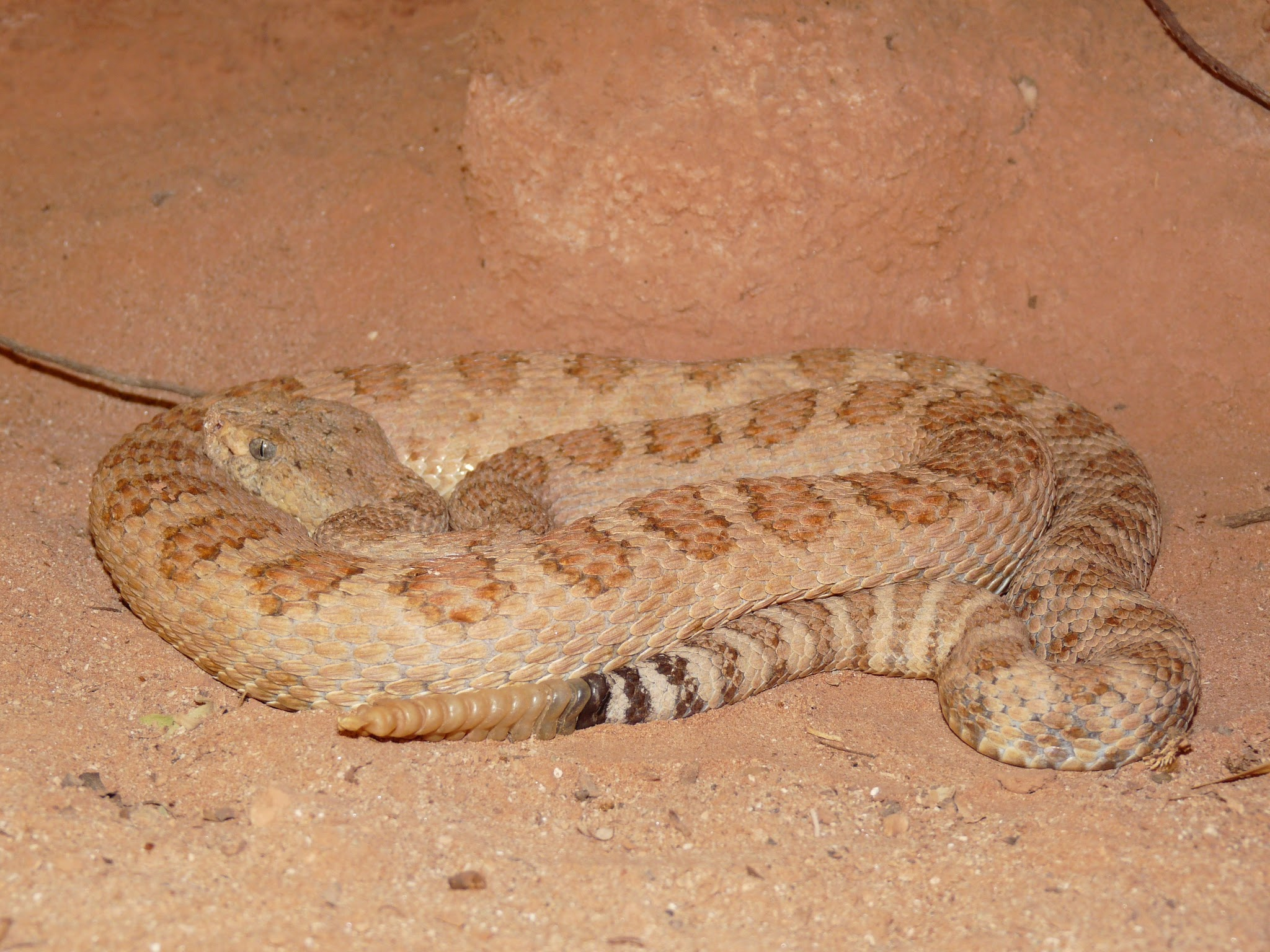
- Grand Canyon rattlesnake Havasu Canyon, Arizona

Scientific classification
- Kingdom: Animalia
- Phylum: Chordata
- Class: Reptilia
- Order: Squamata
- Suborder: Serpentes
- Family: Viperidae
- Genus: Crotalus
- Species: C. oreganus
- Subspecies: C. o. abyssus

Trinomial name
- Crotalus oreganus abyssus Klauber, 1930

Synonyms
- Crotalus confluentus abyssus Klauber, 1930; Crotalus viridis abyssus – Klauber, 1936; Crotalus oreganus abyssus – Ashton & de Queiroz, 2001

= Crotalus oreganus abyssus =

Subspecies of snake

Crotalus oreganus abyssus, commonly known as the Grand Canyon rattlesnake or canyon bleached rattlesnake, is a venomous pit viper subspecies found only in the U.S. states of Arizona and Utah.

== Description ==
This is a medium to large rattlesnake. Adults measure 16–54 inches (41–137 cm) in total length.

Dorsally, they have dark blotches on a variety of base colors ranging from reddish, pink, yellow/green, light tan, to gray. The blotches usually become crossbands near the tail. The young usually have more prominent blotches and facial markings than the adults. Some adults have no body markings.

The rostral scale usually comes into contact with more than 2 internasal scales.

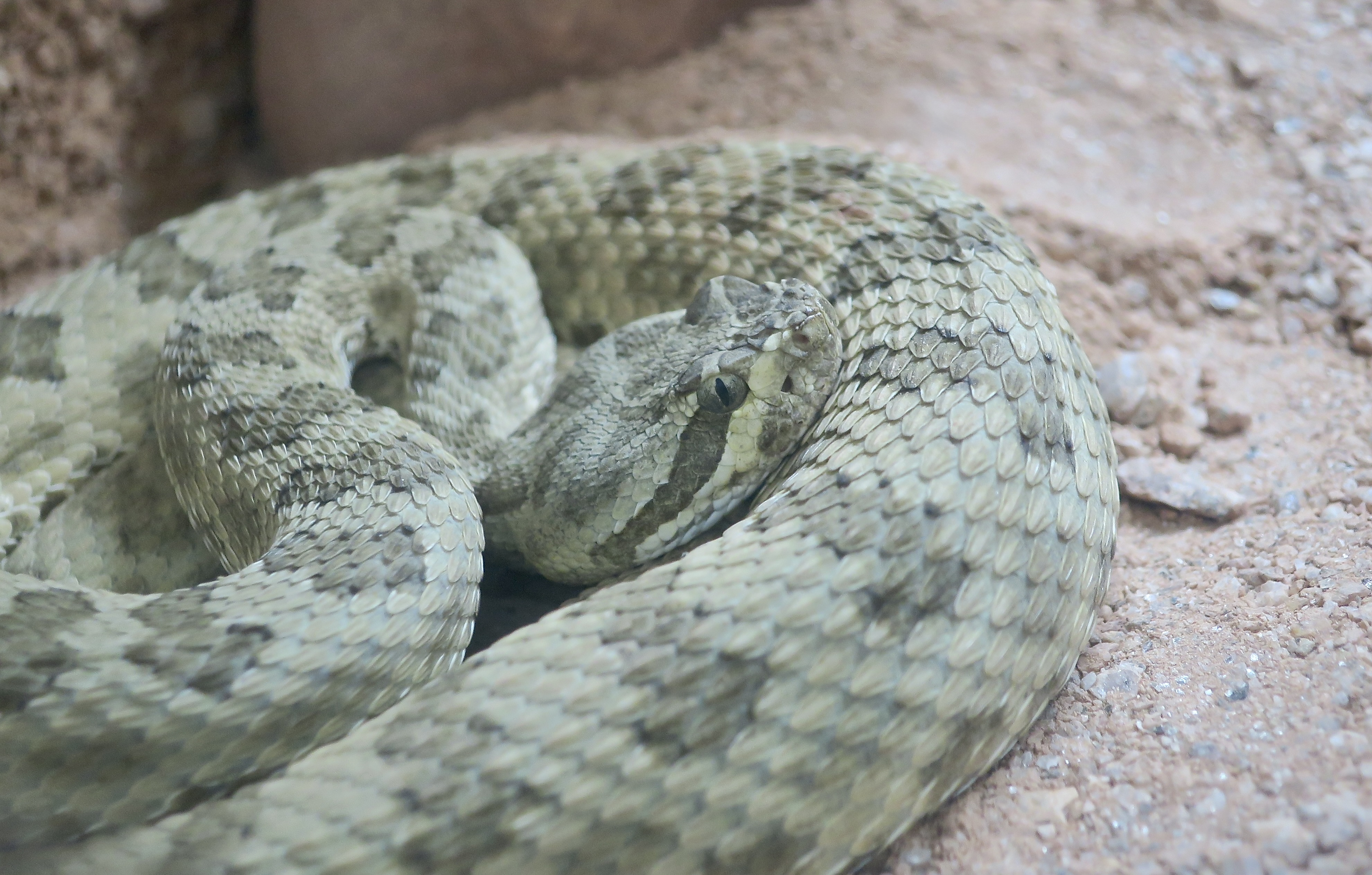
A Grand Canyon rattlesnake at Phoenix Zoo.

== Geographic range ==
Found in northwestern and north-central Arizona along both rims and the floor of the Grand Canyon and adjacent areas, and North into Utah on the Kaiparowits Plateau between the Escalante River and Paria River Drainages of Kane and Garfield Counties, Utah.

== Habitat ==
The snake is found in a variety of habitats, including grassland, Great Basin Desert scrubland, bottoms in the Grand Canyon, talus and cliff slopes, rolling hills and bajadas in pinion-juniper woodland, and pine forests.

== Behavior ==
It is primarily diurnal but can be active around the clock when conditions are favorable. The cryptic coloration and calm demeanor of this subspecies often allows it to escape detection from passers-by.

== Feeding ==
It feeds on mice, lizards, and birds. Like other pit vipers, the Grand Canyon Rattlesnake has heat-sensitive pits that identify body heat of animals to help with hunting. Rock squirrels, which are common in the Grand Canyon area, evade the snake through a process called "mobbing," where the squirrel will attack the snake by kicking dirt and rocks and rapidly waving their tails to heat the air around them, causing the snake to believe there is a larger mammal coming to attack.

== Taxonomy notes ==
Some researchers list this taxon as elevated to a full species as (Crotalus abyssus), or as a subspecies of the Great Basin Rattlesnake (Crotalus lutosus) as Crotalus lutosus abyssus, in the Annotated Checklist of the Rattlesnakes (Second Edition), published in The Biology of Rattlesnakes II 2017.
