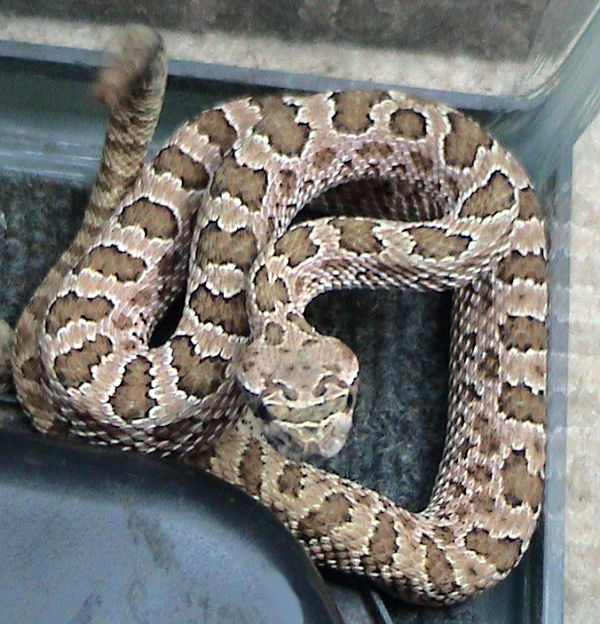

Scientific classification
- Kingdom: Animalia
- Phylum: Chordata
- Class: Reptilia
- Order: Squamata
- Suborder: Serpentes
- Family: Viperidae
- Genus: Crotalus
- Species: C. viridis
- Subspecies: C. v. nuntius

Trinomial name
- Crotalus viridis nuntius Klauber, 1935

Synonyms
- Crotalus confluentus nuntius - Klauber, 1935; Crotalus viridis nuntius - Klauber, 1936

= Crotalus viridis nuntius =

Subspecies of snake

Common names: Hopi rattlesnake, Arizona prairie rattlesnake, prairie rattlesnake.

Crotalus viridis nuntius is a venomous pit viper subspecies native primarily to the desert plateau of the northeastern portion of the American state of Arizona, but also ranges into northwestern New Mexico. Named for the Native American Hopi tribe, which inhabits the region, its range overlaps that of the nominate subspecies and some interbreeding is believed to occur. The taxonomy of the C. viridis group is a matter of debate, many considering the various subspecies to be nothing more than locality variations.

== Description ==
Smaller than other subspecies of C. viridis, this subspecies generally does not generally grow much beyond 2 ft (0.61 m) in length. They are typically pink, to gray to orange-brown in color, reflecting the color of the soil and rocks of their natural range for camouflage, with darker brown blotching down the back.

The scalation consists of 21-27 (usually 25) midbody dorsal scales, 169-184 ventral scales in females and 162-178 in males, and 14-22 subcaudal scales in females and 21-28 in males. The color pattern includes 33-53 dorsal body blotches. Distinguishing C. v. nuntius from C. v. viridis cannot be done reliably.

Like other rattlesnakes, their eyes have vertical pupils and their tails have rattles, composed of keratin. Each time the snake sheds its skin, a new segment is added to the rattle, but the rattle is fragile and may break off, and the frequency of shedding can vary, so the snake's age cannot be determined by its length or number of segments.

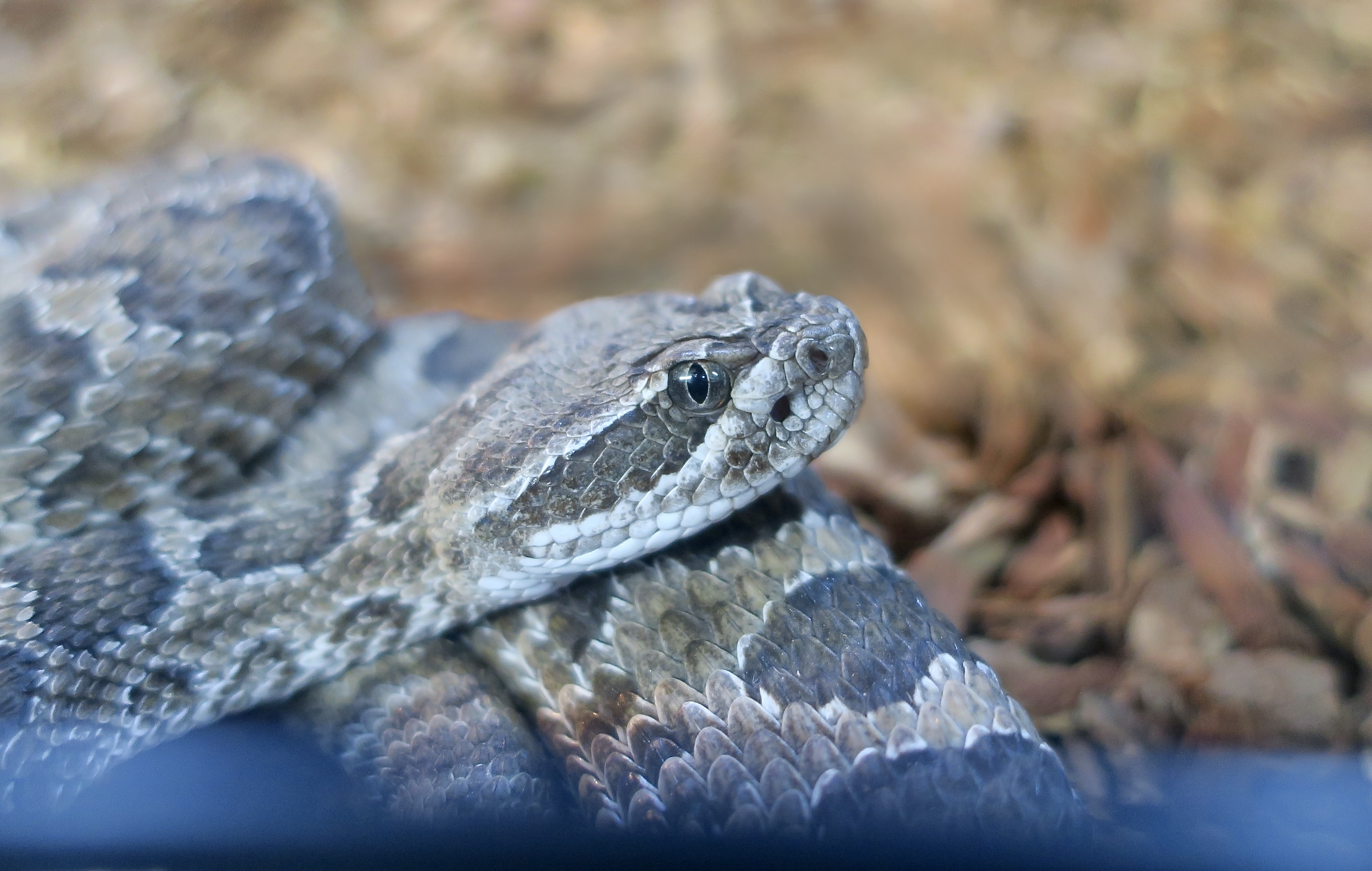
A Hopi rattlesnake at Rattlesnake Ranch, Arizona

== Geographic range ==
This subspecies is found in northeast Arizona at elevations of 1,372–2,134 m (4,501–7,001 ft). The type locality is listed as "Canyon Diablo, Coconino County, Arizona" (USA).

== Behavior ==
These are generally nocturnal and secretive snakes, spending their days in rock crevices or other animals' burrows to avoid the desert heat, emerging in the early day to feed on rodents, birds, lizards, and sometimes frogs.

While not typically aggressive, the snake often coils up and rattles its tail if disturbed, striking only if harassed or handled. Its venom is primarily hemotoxic, causing swelling and necrosis, but many populations of C. viridis are known to have a potent neurotoxic effect, as well, resulting in muscle paralysis and possibly respiratory failure. It is capable of delivering what is known as a "dry bite", in which no venom is injected at all, but a bite from any venomous snake should be considered serious and immediate treatment sought.

== Reproduction ==
These snakes are ovoviviparous, breeding in the spring and giving birth to small clutches of four to six young in the early fall. The young are colored almost identical to the adults and are about 7.5 inches (190 mm) in length. The young are typically more nervous than the adults, and they often strike repeatedly if harassed. They reach maturity between two and three years of age.

== Captivity ==
C. v. nuntius is not commonly kept in captivity, and due to its relatively small range, it is not often collected from the wild. Captive breeding is not unknown, but is not commonplace. It is well represented in zoos throughout the United States, but other subspecies of C. v. viridis are more often kept.

== Mythology ==
See main article: Snakes in mythology

In Hopi tradition, snakes are the guardians of springs. A traditional dance is done as a prayer to bring the rain. Snakes, though not exclusively the Hopi rattlesnake, are used in the ceremony and are released afterwards with the belief that they carry the prayers of the dancers with them.
