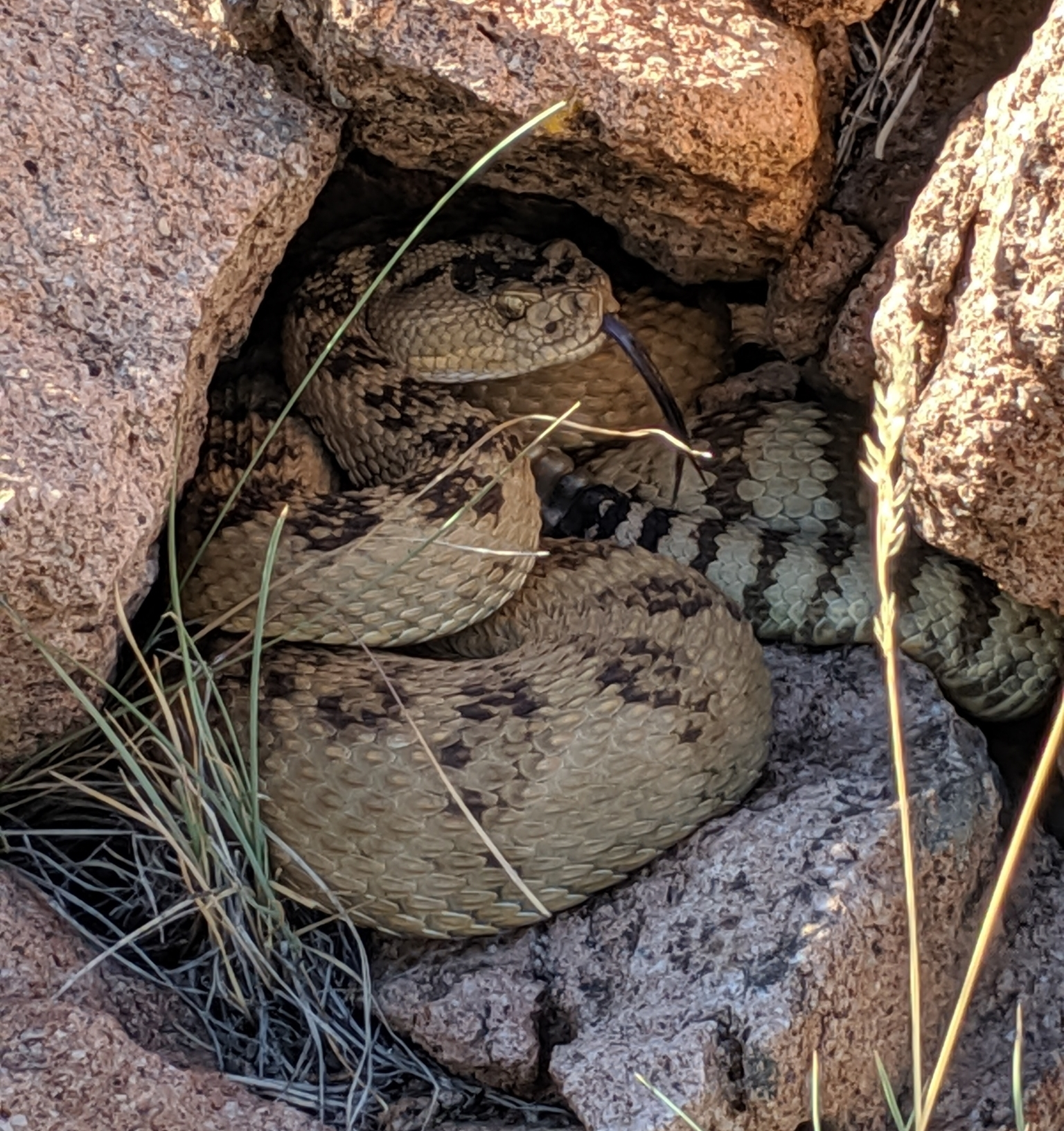

Scientific classification
- Kingdom: Animalia
- Phylum: Chordata
- Class: Reptilia
- Order: Squamata
- Suborder: Serpentes
- Family: Viperidae
- Genus: Crotalus
- Species: C. lutosus

Binomial name
- Crotalus lutosus (Klauber, 1930)

Synonyms
- Crotalus confluentus lutosus Klauber, 1930; Crotalus viridis lutosus – Klauber, 1936; Crotalus oreganus lutosus – Ashton & de Queiroz, 2001

= Great Basin rattlesnake =

Species of snake

The Great Basin rattlesnake (Crotalus lutosus) is a venomous pit viper species found in the Great Basin region of the United States.

== Taxonomy and naming ==
The Great basin rattlesnake was first formally named by Laurence Monroe Klauber in 1930 as a subspecies of Crotalus confluentus (now known as Crotalus viridis). It is commonly considered a subspecies of Crotalus oreganus. The type locality is "10 miles northwest of Abraham on the Road to Joy, Millard County, Utah."

The Grand Canyon rattlesnake (C. abyssus or C. oreganus abyssus) was subsumed within C. lutosus in 2016.

== Description ==
Adult specimens are 66–121 cm (26–48 in) in overall length, but rarely exceed 1 m (3 ft 3 in). The males grow larger than the females.

On the subject of scalation, one of the more distinctive characteristics of this subspecies is that it has three or more internasal scales – something that it has in common with C. viridis.

The color pattern usually consists of a buff, pale gray, pale brown, olive brown or yellowish brown ground color (hence the name, "lutosus," meaning "muddy"), overlaid with a series of 32-49 dorsal blotches. These blotches are dark brown to black in color, with pale centers and pale borders, and are often irregular in shape and wider than they are long. There is also a series of lateral blotches that are indistinct anteriorly, but become more distinct posteriorly and eventually merge with the dorsal blotches to form crossbands. Older specimens sometimes have a faded pattern, or they may have uniformly black blotches, with the dorsum of the head also being black.

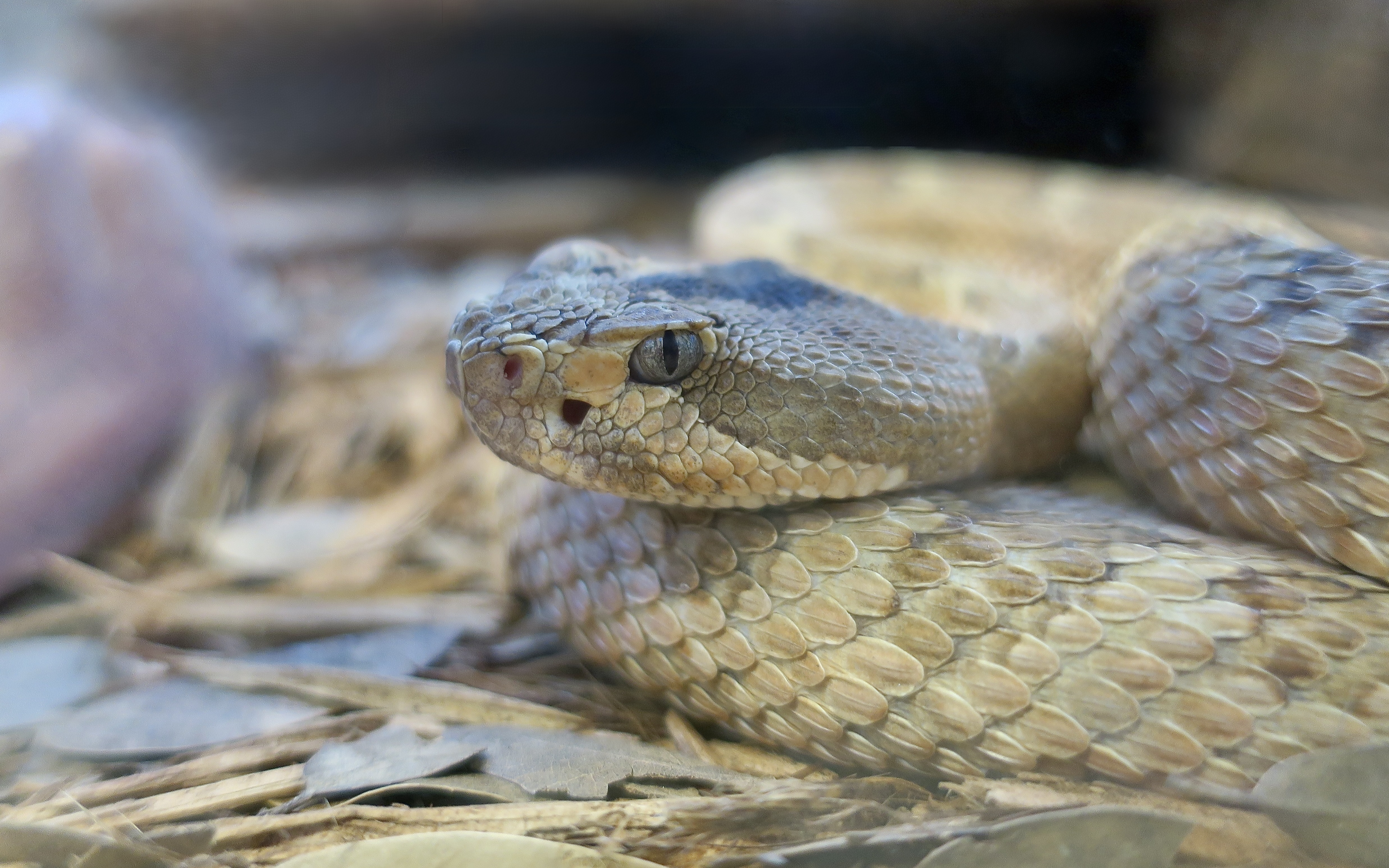
A Great Basin rattlesnake at Phoenix Herpetological Sanctuary.

== Distribution and habitat ==
The United States in the Great Basin region. Its range includes Idaho south of lat. 44° North, Utah west of long. 111° West, Arizona west and north of the Colorado River as well as the north rim of the Grand Canyon, the entire state of Nevada (excluding Esmeralda, Nye and Clark counties), California east of the Sierra Nevada from Lower Klamath Lake south to below Lake Mono, Oregon south and east of the line Upper Klamath Lake–Fort Rock–Burns–Council (Idaho).

Inhabits the dry and barren areas of the Great Basin region, being found on hills, summits and old lake benches. They are said to prefer southern exposures among rocks and boulders on hillsides and buttes, low foothills, mountainsides, open deserts, alfalfa fields and valley floors.

They are most commonly seen by humans while hiking but also on the side of the road at night looking for prey.

== Diet ==
Crotalus lutosus feeds on amphibians, reptiles, birds, bird eggs, and mammals.

== Reproduction ==
Young are born alive in broods of 3 to 13.

== Conservation status ==
The Great Basin rattlesnake is protected in Utah.
