= Crotalus oreganus caliginis =

Conservation status
- Least Concern (IUCN 3.1)

Scientific classification
- Kingdom: Animalia
- Phylum: Chordata
- Class: Reptilia
- Order: Squamata
- Suborder: Serpentes
- Family: Viperidae
- Genus: Crotalus
- Species: C. oreganus
- Subspecies: C. o. caliginis

Trinomial name
- Crotalus oreganus caliginis Klauber, 1949
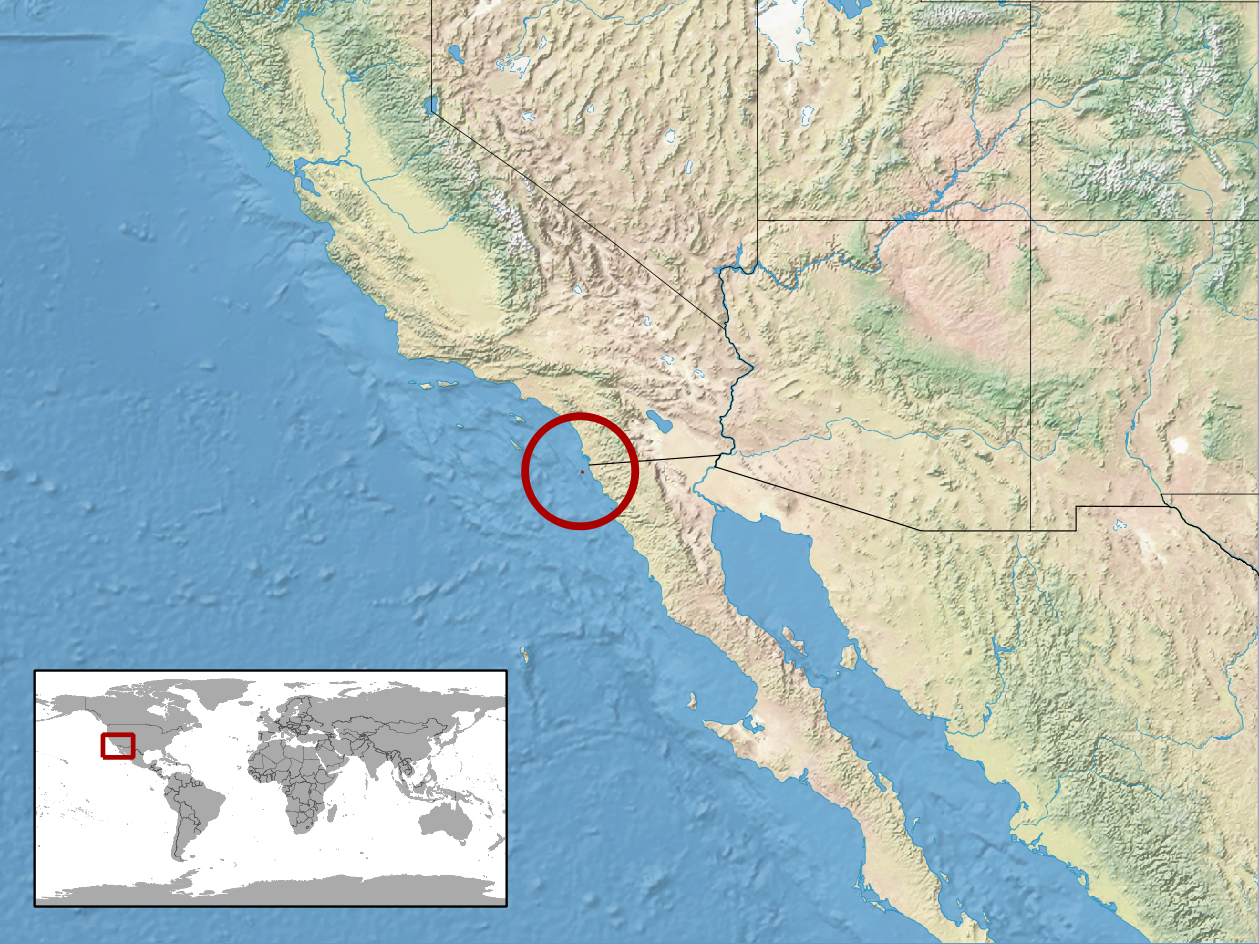
- Location of South Coronado Island

Synonyms
- Crotalus viridis caliginis Klauber, 1949; Crotalus oreganus caliginis – Ashton & de Queiroz, 2001

Subspecies of snake

Common names: Coronado Island rattlesnake.

Crotalus oreganus caliginis is a venomous pit viper subspecies endemic to South Coronado Island, Mexico.

== Description ==
Adults grow to a maximum size of 68.3 cm (26 7/8 in).

== Geographic range ==
Known only from the type locality, given as "South Coronado Island, off the northwest coast of Baja California, Mexico."

== Conservation status ==
This species is classified as least concern on the IUCN Red List of Threatened Species (v3.1, 2001). Species are listed as such due to their wide distribution, presumed large population, or because it is unlikely to be declining fast enough to qualify for listing in a more threatened category. The population trend was stable when assessed in 2007.
