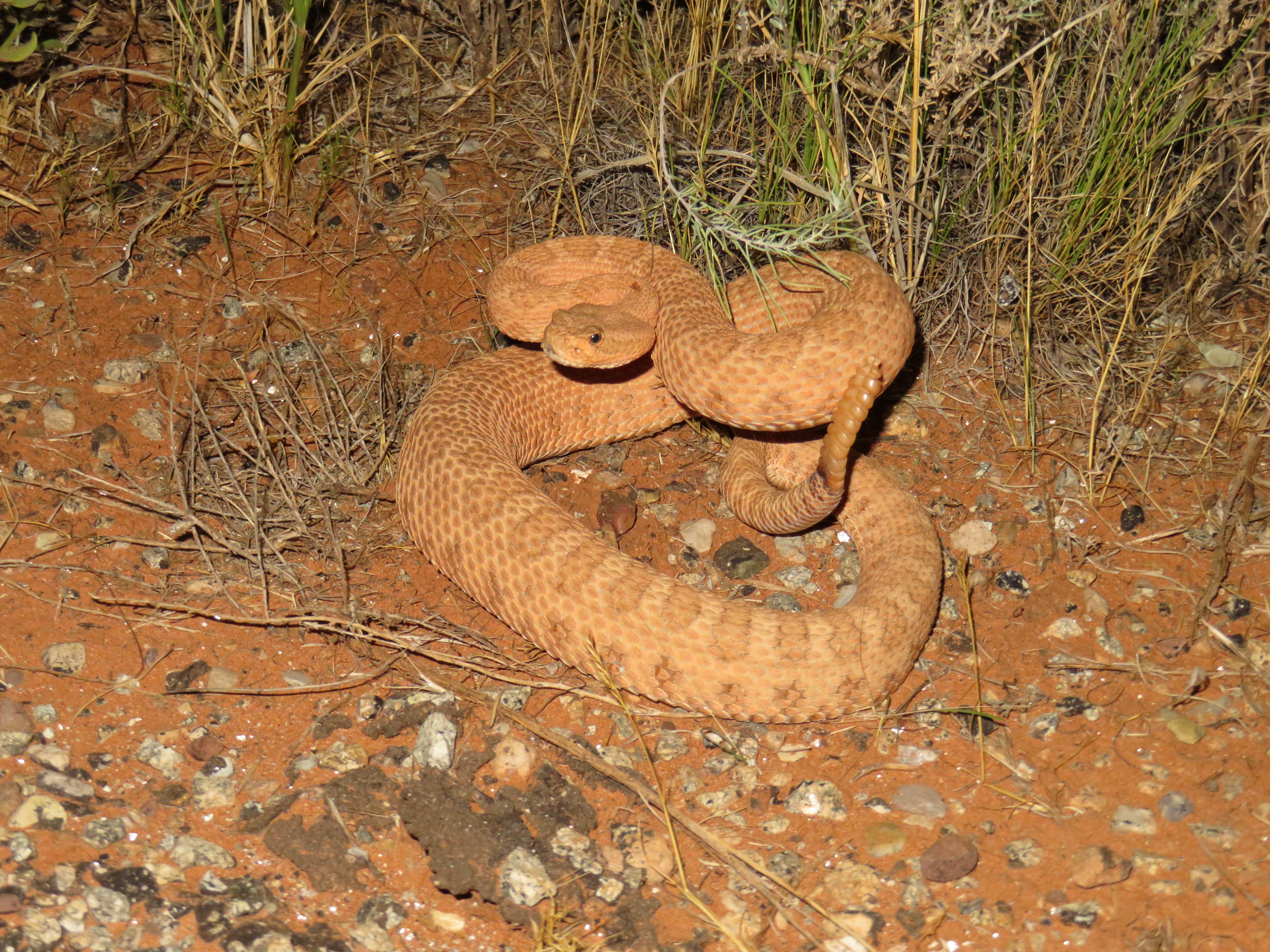

Scientific classification
- Kingdom: Animalia
- Phylum: Chordata
- Class: Reptilia
- Order: Squamata
- Suborder: Serpentes
- Family: Viperidae
- Genus: Crotalus
- Species: C. concolor

Binomial name
- Crotalus concolor Woodbury, 1929
- Geographical range of the Midget Faded Rattlesnake

Synonyms
- Crotalus concolor Woodbury, 1929; Crotalus confluentus decolor Klauber, 1930; Crotalus confluentus concolor – Woodbury, 1930; Crotalus viridis concolor – Klauber, 1936; Crotalus viridis decolor – Gloyd, 1940; Crotalus viridis decolor – Klauber, 1956; Crotalus viridis concolor – Klauber, 1972; Crotalus oreganus concolor – Ashton & de Queiroz, 2001

= Crotalus concolor =

Species of snake

Crotalus concolor, commonly known as the midget faded rattlesnake, faded rattlesnake, and yellow rattlesnake, is a pit viper species found in the western United States. It is a small rattlesnake known for its faded color pattern. Like all other pit vipers, it is venomous.

== Description ==
The color pattern of this species consists of a pinkish, pale brown, yellow-brown, straw-colored, reddish, or yellow-brown ground color, overlaid with a series of brown elliptical or rectangular dorsal blotches. However, most specimens are gray or silvery. In juveniles, the pattern is distinct, but becomes faded in adults, almost to the point where it is indistinguishable from the ground color. This has led to the snake sometimes being locally referred to as the "horseshoe rattler."

Adult individuals typically measure between 50 and 60 cm (19.5 and 23.5 in) in length, although they can reach up to 75 cm (30 in). This is notably shorter than the typical western rattlesnake, which can grow up to 126 cm (50 in). The smallest gravid female measured was 52.2 cm (20 1/2 in).

Males are generally larger than females, and the snakes weigh around 120 g (4.2 oz), although they can weigh as much as 200 g (7.1 oz). Newborns of this subspecies are 50 to 100 mm (2.0 to 3.9 in) shorter than other western rattlesnake subspecies and weigh about half as much.

The scales are keeled, and the snake has an entire anal plate. Like all rattlesnakes, the tail ends in a horny rattle, with the number of tail rings indicating the number of molts the snake has undergone.

The venom of the Midget Faded Rattlesnake is neurotoxic and is considered one of the most potent among Crotalid venoms. The snakes are generally non-aggressive when left undisturbed.

== Geographic range ==
Found in the United States in the Colorado and Green River basins. This area covers southwestern Wyoming, Utah east of long. 111° West (excluding the southeastern corner) and extreme west-central Colorado. The type locality given is "King's Ranch, Garfield Co., at the base of the Henry Mts [Utah]."

== Diet and Feeding Behavior ==
The Faded Rattlesnake is a prey generalist that employs a sit-and-wait ambush strategy for hunting. A study done in 2007 identified 25 different prey items consumed by this species, most of which were identified through palpation or voluntary regurgitation by the snakes. The identified prey items included 16 lizards, six small mammals, and three birds, such as Deer Mouse (Peromyscus maniculatus), Wood Rat (Neotoma albigula), and various Sceloporus species.

Spatial trends in prey consumption have been observed, with lizards primarily consumed in rocky areas and mammals and birds consumed in sagebrush steppes where lizards are less common. However, the study did not report prey preference based on the snake's age class or any other characteristics.

Ontogenetic shifts in prey preference have been noted, with a transition from primarily consuming lizards to mammals as the snakes grow. This shift is similar to what has been observed in other rattlesnake species, although no corresponding shift in venom composition was noted.

In Arizona specifically, the diet of Crotalus concolor is largely unknown. However, one observation noted the snake consuming Ord's Kangaroo Rat (Dipodomys ordii), adding a new species to the known prey items for this rattlesnake.

During predatory and defensive contexts, Crotalus concolor has been found to inject similar amounts of venom into both mice and lizards, despite the mass of envenomated mice being four times greater than that of the lizards.

== Habitat and Movement Behavior ==
This species predominantly inhabits high, cold deserts characterized by sagebrush (Artemisia (plant)) and an abundance of rock outcrops and exposed canyon walls. Greasewood (Sarcobatus vermiculatus), juniper (Juniperus scopulorum), and other woody plants are also present, sometimes even dominating certain areas. Juniper woodlands are more prevalent at higher altitudes.

Rock outcrops serve as focal points for these rattlesnake populations, providing escape cover, thermal cover, and hibernacula. These outcrops are particularly important given the short warm seasons and long, cold winters in the snake's range. The snakes often den in groups, sometimes comprising up to 100 individuals. In Wyoming, where the subspecies reaches its northern limits, the distribution of suitable denning outcrops is a key factor in the snake's distribution.

After emerging from hibernation in April and May, the snakes stay near the den entrance for 2 to 3 weeks before moving to "shedding habitats," characterized by large flat rocks that assist in molting. Adult males and non-gravid females typically migrate an average of 2,122 m and 1,956 m, respectively, while gravid and post-partum females usually move only about 297 m.

Aggregating behavior is common among Midget Faded Rattlesnakes. They often aggregate during gestation, and young snakes stay with their mother for about a week after birth. This behavior is thought to be an adaptation to environmental pressures, enhancing predator defense as well as osmo- and thermoregulation.

Gravid females typically move less than 20 m from their hibernaculum upon emergence. Males and non-gravid females, on the other hand, have some of the longest migrations and largest activity ranges reported for rattlesnakes. The snakes have separate winter/spring and summer activity ranges and make shorter, more random movements primarily associated with hunting during the summer.

== Venom ==
This species possesses the most toxic venom of the C. oreganus / C. viridis group, although apparently considerable variability exists among local populations. It is even one of the most potent venoms found in North America, and according to LD_{50} studies, the venom is many times more potent than that of an Asiatic cobra. It is characterized by the presence of a presynaptic neurotoxin, referred to as concolor toxin, the amount of which varies in individual snakes. In rattlesnakes, venom is generally categorized into two types: Type I, which has high metalloprotease activity and lower toxicity, and Type II, characterized by high toxicity neurotoxins. Unlike some other rattlesnakes that undergo an ontogenetic shift in venom composition, C. concolor does not show significant changes in venom toxicity as it matures. This phenomenon is termed "venom paedomorphosis," where the snake retains its juvenile venom characteristics into adulthood.

The venom of C. concolor is particularly potent, being 5–30 times more lethal than that of other Western Rattlesnake species. It contains a potent presynaptic phospholipase A2-based neurotoxin, known as "concolor toxin," which blocks the release of acetylcholine from nerve axon terminals, resulting in rapid prey immobilization. The venom also contains non-enzymatic peptide myotoxins, which further contribute to its toxicity.

Human envenomations by C. concolor are rare, likely due to the snake's remote habitat and generally mild disposition. Symptoms of envenomation can include numbness, swelling, loss of balance, vomiting, and more. Treatment with CroFab antivenom is recommended and has been found to be effective even when administered 52 hours post-envenomation.
