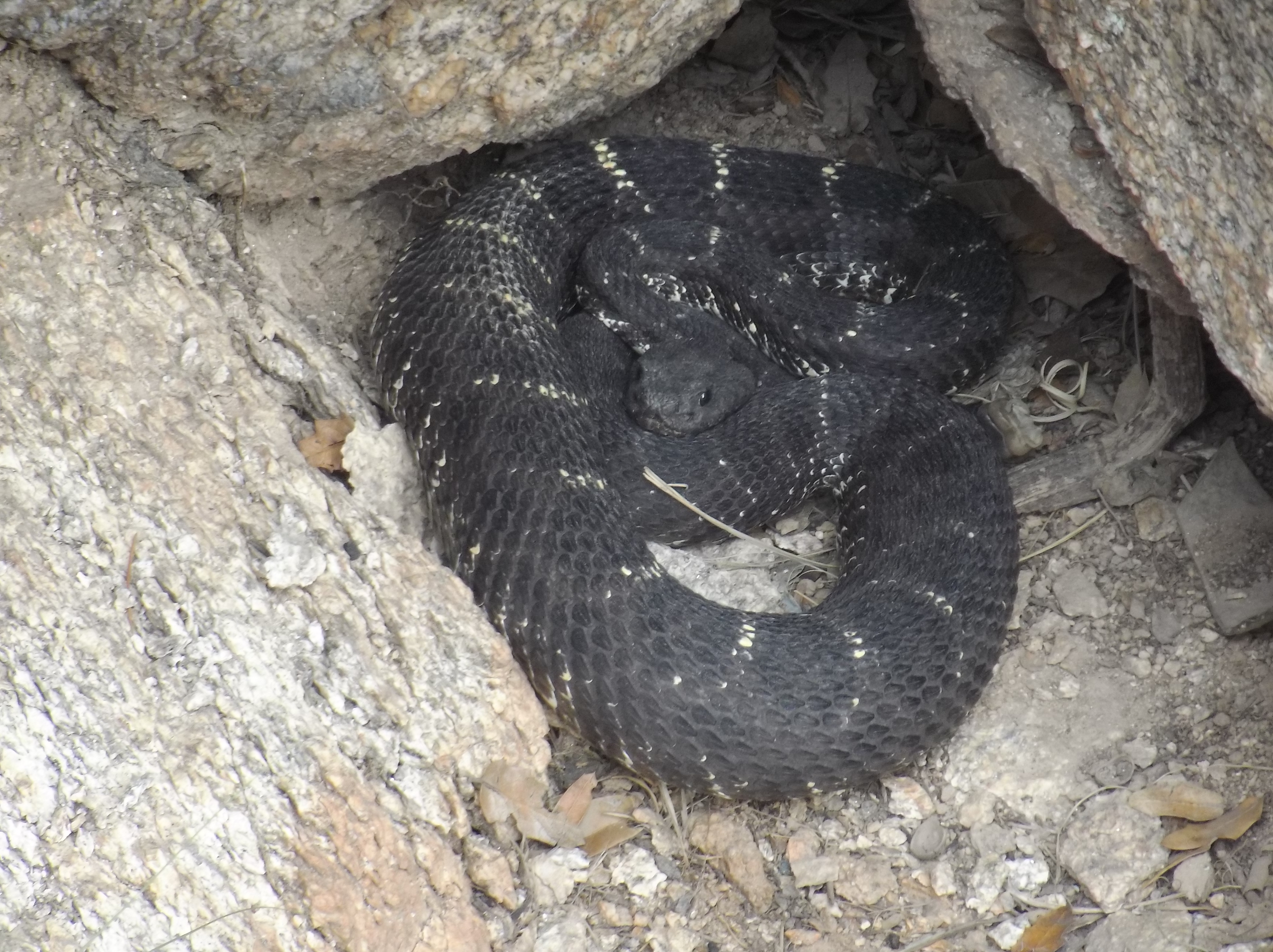

Scientific classification
- Kingdom: Animalia
- Phylum: Chordata
- Class: Reptilia
- Order: Squamata
- Suborder: Serpentes
- Family: Viperidae
- Genus: Crotalus
- Species: C. cerberus

Binomial name
- Crotalus cerberus (Coues In Wheeler, 1875)

Synonyms
- Caudisona lucifer var. cerberus Coues In Wheeler, 1875; [Crotalus oreganus] Var. cerberus – Garman, 1884; Crotalus viridis cerberus – Klauber, 1949; Crotalus oreganus cerberus – Ashton & de Queiroz, 2001; Crotalus cerberus – Hoser, 2009

= Crotalus cerberus =

Species of snake

Crotalus cerberus is a venomous pit viper species found in the southwestern United States. It is known as the Arizona black rattlesnake, black rattlesnake, and several other common names.

== Description ==
According to Wright and Wright (1957), adults grow to an average length of 78–109 cm (31–43 in). Klauber (1997) reports the maximum length to be less at 1,032 mm (40 5/8 in), with the smallest gravid female measuring 701 mm (27 5/8 in). Hubbs and O'Connor (2012) list an adult size range of 812–1,219 mm (32.0–48.0 in).

The ground color varies among dark grayish, brownish black, reddish brown, or blackish. This is overlaid with a dorsal pattern of blotches that are rectangular anteriorly, become subhexagonal posteriorly, and finally form crossbands just before the tail.

However, specimens also may be a uniform dark color without any clear dorsal pattern, or the dorsal blotches may be even darker and bordered with white, cream, or yellow transverse rows of scales, or the color pattern may be quite pale with a significant amount of yellow mixed in. A postocular stripe is evident in lightly colored specimens, but not so much in darker ones.

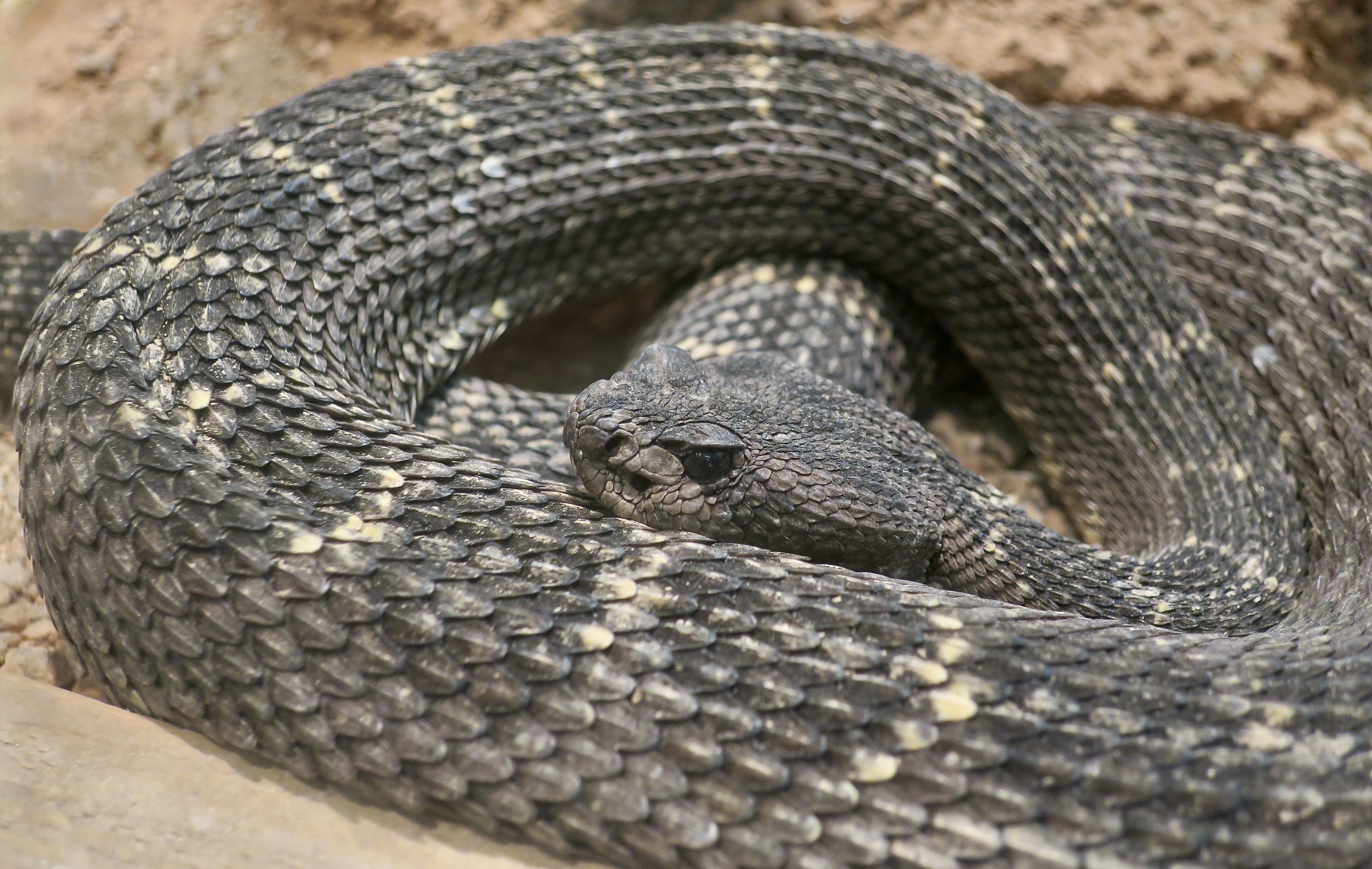
An Arizona black rattlesnake at Phoenix Zoo.

== Color change ==
Arizona black rattlesnakes undergo morphological color change (gradual change due to changes in number or quality of chromatophores); adults are less patterned than juveniles (also called ontogenetic color change). Some adults can change color relatively quickly (physiological color change: rapid change due to movement of organelles within chromatophores), an ability shared not only with chameleons and other lizards but also with other snakes such as some species in the genus Tropidophis. The mechanism for their physiological color change is likely the same as that documented in the closely related prairie rattlesnake (melanin movement within their dermal melanophores), but further research is needed to determine the stimuli for this phenomenon in this rattlesnake.

== Common names ==
Arizona black rattlesnake, black rattlesnake, black diamond rattlesnake, brown rattlesnake, Cerberus rattlesnake, mountain diamond-back. Also often incorrectly referred to as a timber rattlesnake.

== Geographic range ==
Found in the United States, in Arizona from the Hualapai Mountains and Cottonwood Cliffs in the northwest of the state, southeast to the Santa Catalina, Rincon, Pinaleno and Blue Mountains. Also found at Steeple Rock, in extreme western New Mexico. The type locality given is "San Francisco Mountains" (Coconino County, Arizona, USA).

== Diet ==
It preys upon suitably sized amphibians, reptiles, birds and their eggs, and mammals.

== Reproduction ==
Sexually mature females bear live young in broods of 4 to 21 neonates. The Arizona black rattlesnake is the first species of snake observed to exhibit complex social behavior, and like all temperate pit vipers, care for their babies. Females remain with their young in nests for 7 to 14 days, occasionally exhibiting cooperative parenting behaviors.
