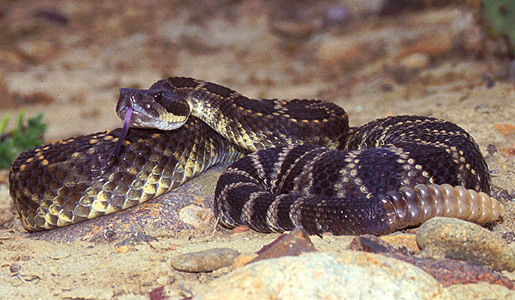

Scientific classification
- Kingdom: Animalia
- Phylum: Chordata
- Class: Reptilia
- Order: Squamata
- Suborder: Serpentes
- Family: Viperidae
- Genus: Crotalus
- Species: C. helleri

Binomial name
- Crotalus helleri Meek, 1905

Synonyms
- Crotalus helleri Meek, 1905; Crotalus viridis helleri — Klauber, 1949; Crotalus oreganus helleri — Ashton et al., 2001

= Crotalus helleri =

Southern Pacific rattlesnake

Species of snake

Crotalus helleri or Crotalus oreganus helleri, also known commonly as the Southern Pacific rattlesnake, the black diamond rattlesnake, and by several other common names, is a pit viper species or subspecies found in southwestern California and south into Baja California, Mexico, that is known for its regional variety of dangerous venom types. It is sometimes considered a subspecies of Crotalus oreganus.

== Etymology ==
The specific or subspecific name, helleri, is in honor of American zoologist Edmund Heller.

== Description ==
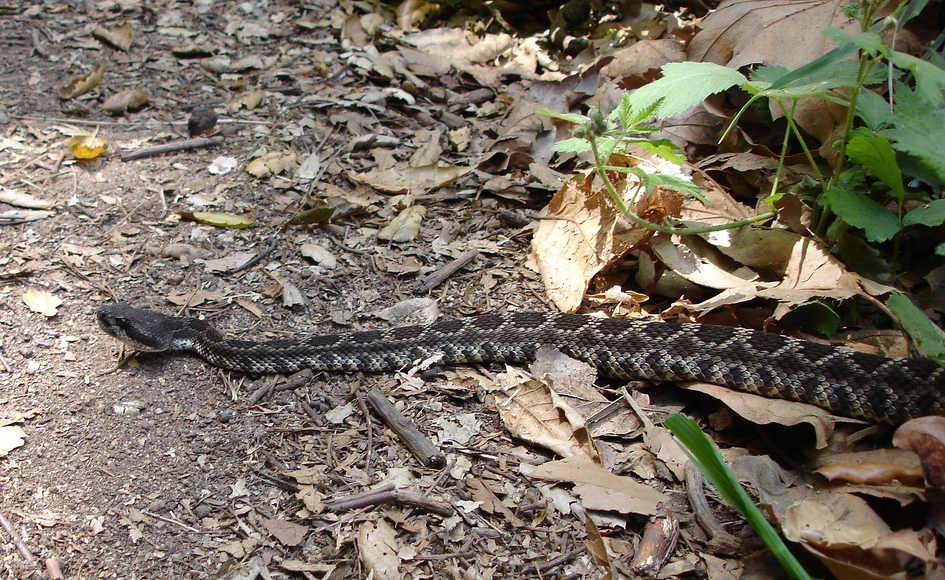
C. helleri

Adults of C. helleri are 24–55 inches (61–139 cm) in total length (including tail).

The color pattern consists of a pale brown, gray-brown, or yellowish brown ground color overlaid with a series of large, dark brown dorsal blotches that may or may not have pale centers. The blotches are more diamond shaped, as opposed to those of C. o. oreganus that are more hexagonal, and are bordered by light scales. The tail rings are not clearly defined. In juveniles, the end of the tail is bright orange, but this turns to brown as the snakes mature. In adults, the base of the tail and the first segment of the rattle are brown. The postocular stripe is moderately to very clearly defined. In juveniles, this stripe is bordered above by a pale stripe, but as the snakes mature this turns to drab yellow or brown. A conspicuous pale crossbar is sometimes present across the supraoculars, after which the head is a uniform dark color. In some older snakes the head is mostly dark with almost no trace of the supraorbital crossbar, or none at all.

== Common names ==
Common names for C. helleri include Southern Pacific rattlesnake, black diamond rattlesnake, black (diamond) rattler, gray diamond-back, mountain rattler, Pacific rattler, and San Diegan rattler.

== Venom varieties ==
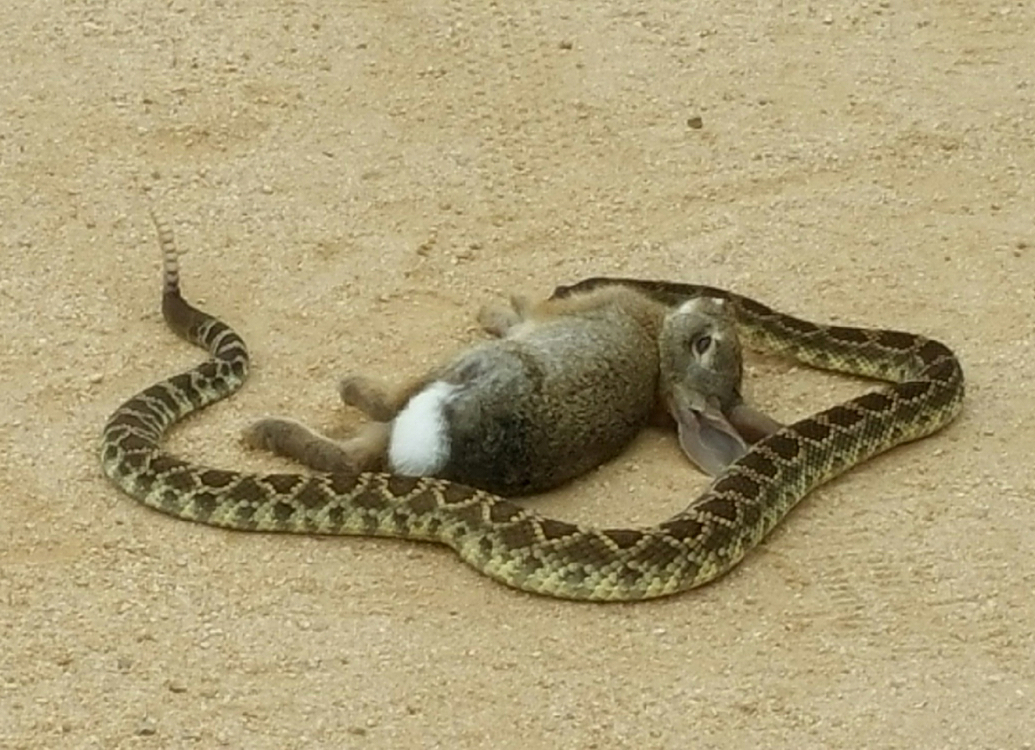
Eating a cottontail rabbit

Some populations of C. helleri have a neurotoxic venom that is very similar to the extremely dangerous Mojave rattlesnake (the "Mojave Green") toxin in the way it attacks the nervous system. Other populations can have hemotoxic and myotoxic venom that is more typical among rattlesnakes and though less dangerous, can also give a fatal bite. Thus, depending on where the bite was sustained, envenomation from this snake can require a much higher dose of Crotalidae polyvalent immune fab ("Crofab"), an antivenom used to treat the bite of North American pit vipers, than the venoms of other rattlesnakes, including the venom of C. helleri specimens of different provenance. In a survey of various populations of Crotalus in California, every sampled specimen with disabling neurotoxic venom had originated near Idyllwild, California, in the San Jacinto Mountains. Scientists considered the intraspecific variety of venom types "medically significant", while hypothesizing that evolutionary pressures, driven by regional habitat differences and the associated challenges of hunting prey in each, could have been behind the variation of venom types in C. helleri, and that cross-breeding with the Mojave rattlesnake, which is geographically separated from neurotoxic Crotalus populations, was unlikely.

== Behavioral variations ==
Scientists studying the dwarf subspecies of C. helleri inhabiting California's Santa Catalina Island found that these snakes "attempted to bite 4.7-fold more often than mainland snakes" of the same species, and that "the island snakes delivered 2.1-fold more venom when biting" than their mainland counterparts.

=== Social Buffering ===
Social buffering is the circumstance where while in the presence of a conspecific (same species) the amount of stress in an individual can be significantly lowered or reduced. While this occurrence had not yet been reported in reptiles, a 2023 study completed by the universities California State and Loma Linda have helped us further understand the Southern Pacific Rattlesnake. By measuring the heart rate of the snakes while under acute stress they were able to prove that, while with a conspecific, the snakes heart rate was significantly reduced. With this information scientists are able to come to the conclusion that the rattlesnakes were less stressed while together and come to a further understanding that social buffering is present within this group of reptiles.

== Geographic range ==
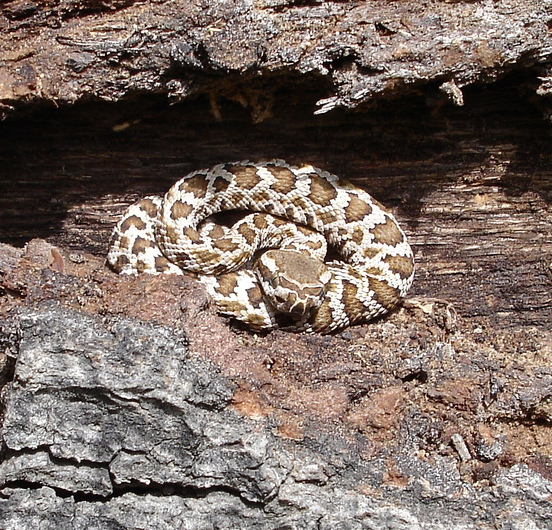
C. helleri, juvenile

C. helleri is found in the United States in southern California, and in Mexico in northern Baja California, west of the desert. In the north it is found from the counties of San Luis Obispo and Kern, and south through the counties of Santa Barbara, Ventura, Los Angeles (including Santa Catalina Island and the foothills), southwestern San Bernardino, Orange, western Riverside, San Diego and extreme western Imperial. From there its range extends south through Baja California to lat. 28° 30' North. According to Klauber (1956), the type locality is "San Jose, Lower California" [San José, lat. 31° N, Baja California (state), Mexico].
