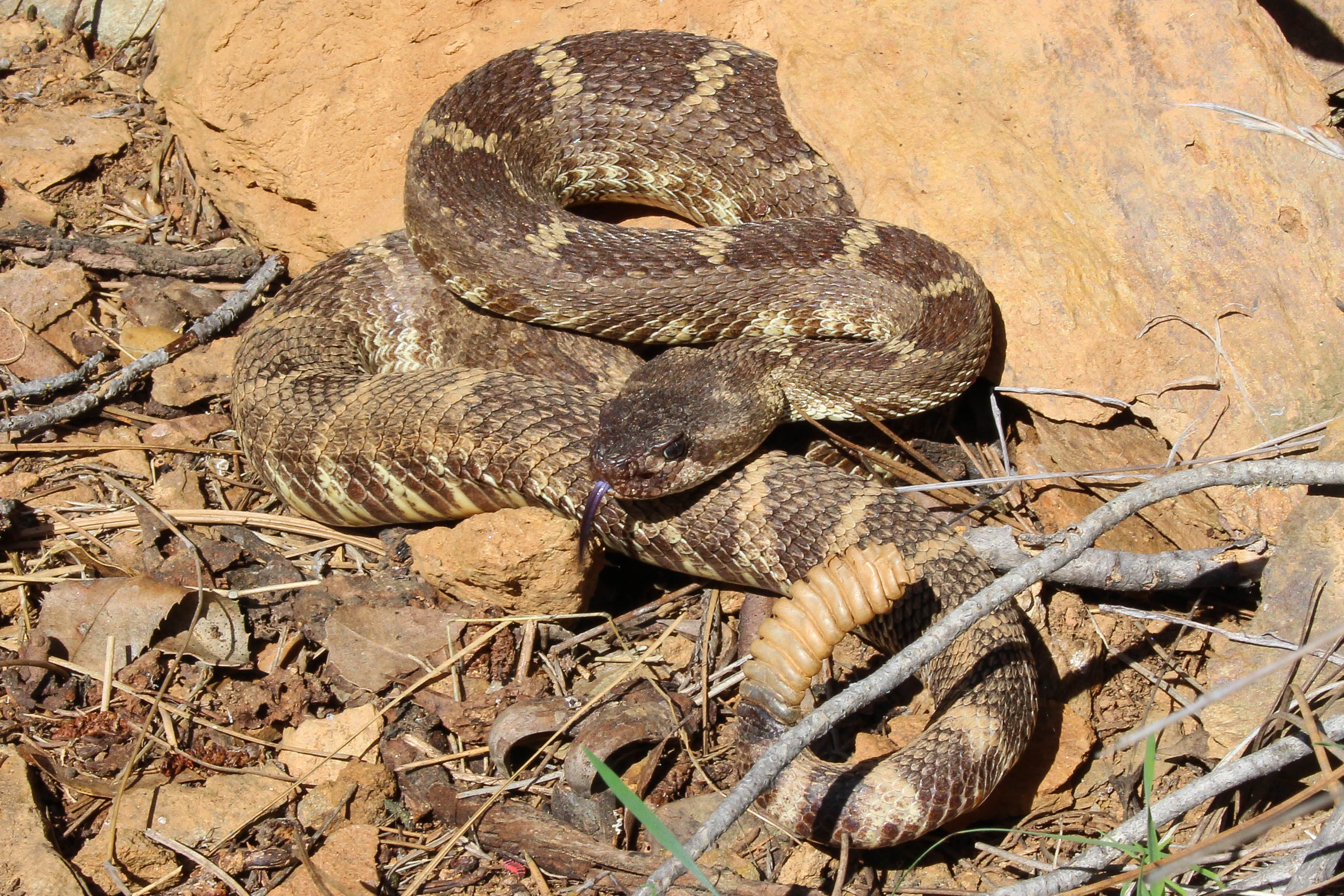
- In a defensive posture

Conservation status
- Least Concern (IUCN 3.1)

Scientific classification
- Kingdom: Animalia
- Phylum: Chordata
- Class: Reptilia
- Order: Squamata
- Suborder: Serpentes
- Family: Viperidae
- Genus: Crotalus
- Species: C. oreganus

Binomial name
- Crotalus oreganus Holbrook, 1840
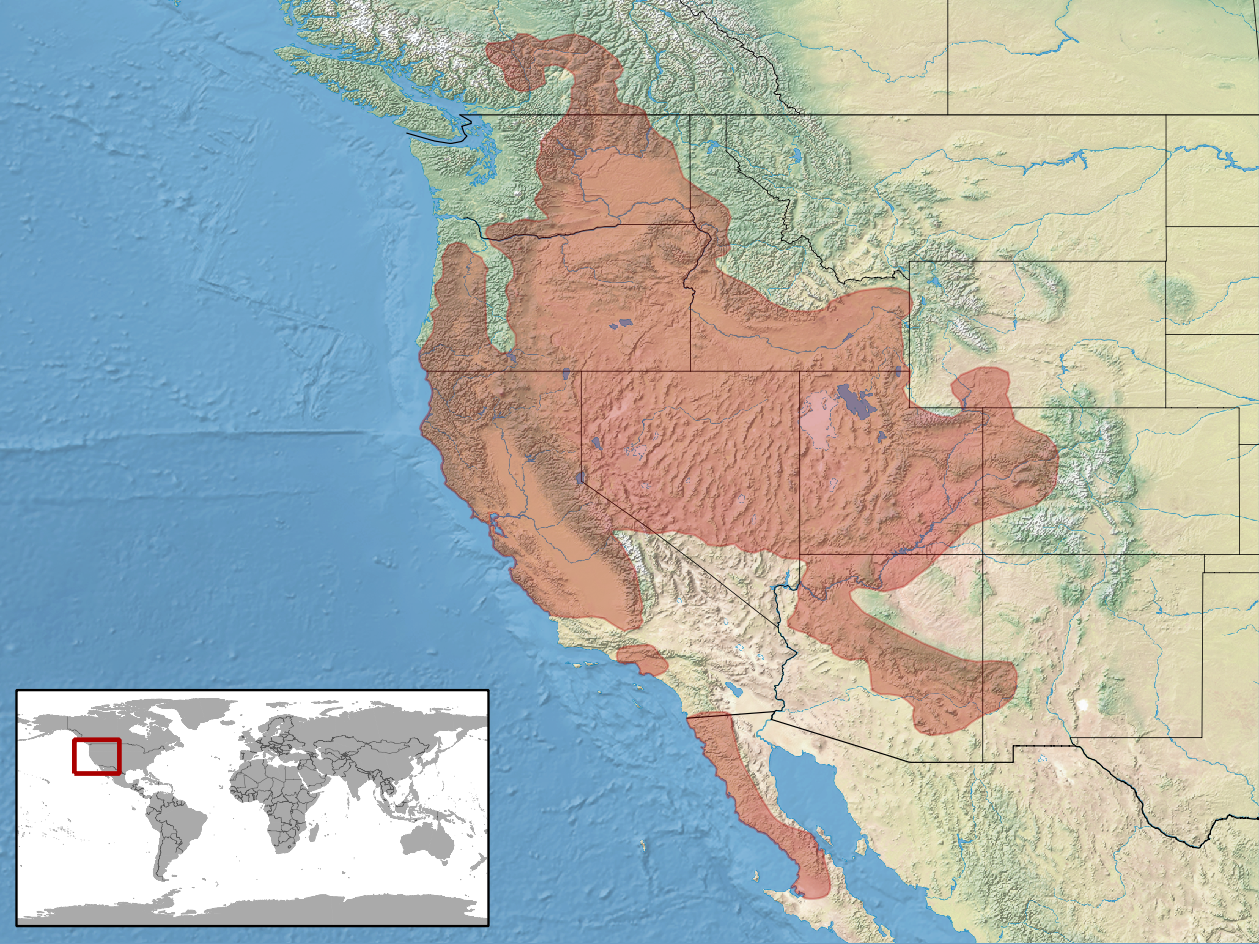

Synonyms
- List: Crotalus oreganus Holbrook, 1840; Crotalus oregonus [sic] – Holbrook, 1842; Crotalus lucifer Baird & Girard, 1852; C[rotalus]. adamanteus var. lucifer – Jan, 1863; C[audisona]. lucifer – Cope, 1867; Crotalus hallowelli Cooper In Cronise, 1868; Crotalus confluentus var. lucifer – Cope, 1883; [Crotalus oreganus] Var. lucifer – Garman, 1884; Crotalus confluentus lucifer – Cope, 1892; Crotalus oreganus – Van Denburgh, 1898; Crotalus oreganus niger Kallert, 1927 (Nomen nudum); Crotalus confluentus oreganus – Amaral, 1929; Crotalus viridis oreganus – Klauber, 1936; Crotalus oreganus oreganus – Ashton & de Queiroz, 2001

= Crotalus oreganus =

North American rattlesnake

Crotalus oreganus, commonly known as the Western rattlesnake or northern Pacific rattlesnake, is a venomous pit viper species found in western North America from the Baja California Peninsula to the southern interior of British Columbia.

== Description ==
The size of this species varies greatly, with some populations being stunted and others growing very large. Mainland specimens often reach 100 cm (39 in) in length, with the largest on record being 162.6 cm (64.0 in) (Klauber, 1956) for C. o. oreganus. The species also varies in size in relation to its migration routes as individuals with longer and more linear paths tend to have more mass. The C. oreganus is classified with 6 subspecies with 3 of them being present within the state of California.

This species, in its various forms, shows considerable ontogenetic variation. Juveniles usually have more or less distinct patterns, but these fade as the animals mature. The color of the iris often matches the ground color, which may be bronze, gold, or different shades of tan, pink, or gray.

The habitat and/or the substrate of the Crotalus oreganus determines their coloration. The color pattern of the typical form, C. o. oreganus, has a dark-brown, dark-gray, olive-brown, or sometimes black or pale yellowish ground color overlaid dorsally with a series of large, dark blotches with uneven white edges. These blotches are also wider than the spaces that separate them. Additionally, a lateral series of blotches, usually darker than the dorsal blotches, is clearly visible on all but the darkest specimens. The first rings of the tail are about the same color as the last body blotches, but these rings become progressively darker; the last two rings, at the base of the tail, are usually black. The belly is pale yellow, usually with brown spots. A large, dark-brown blotch on the snout has a pale border behind it that forms transverse bars on the supraoculars. There is a dark brown postocular stripe with a white border that extends from the eye to around the angle of the jaw.

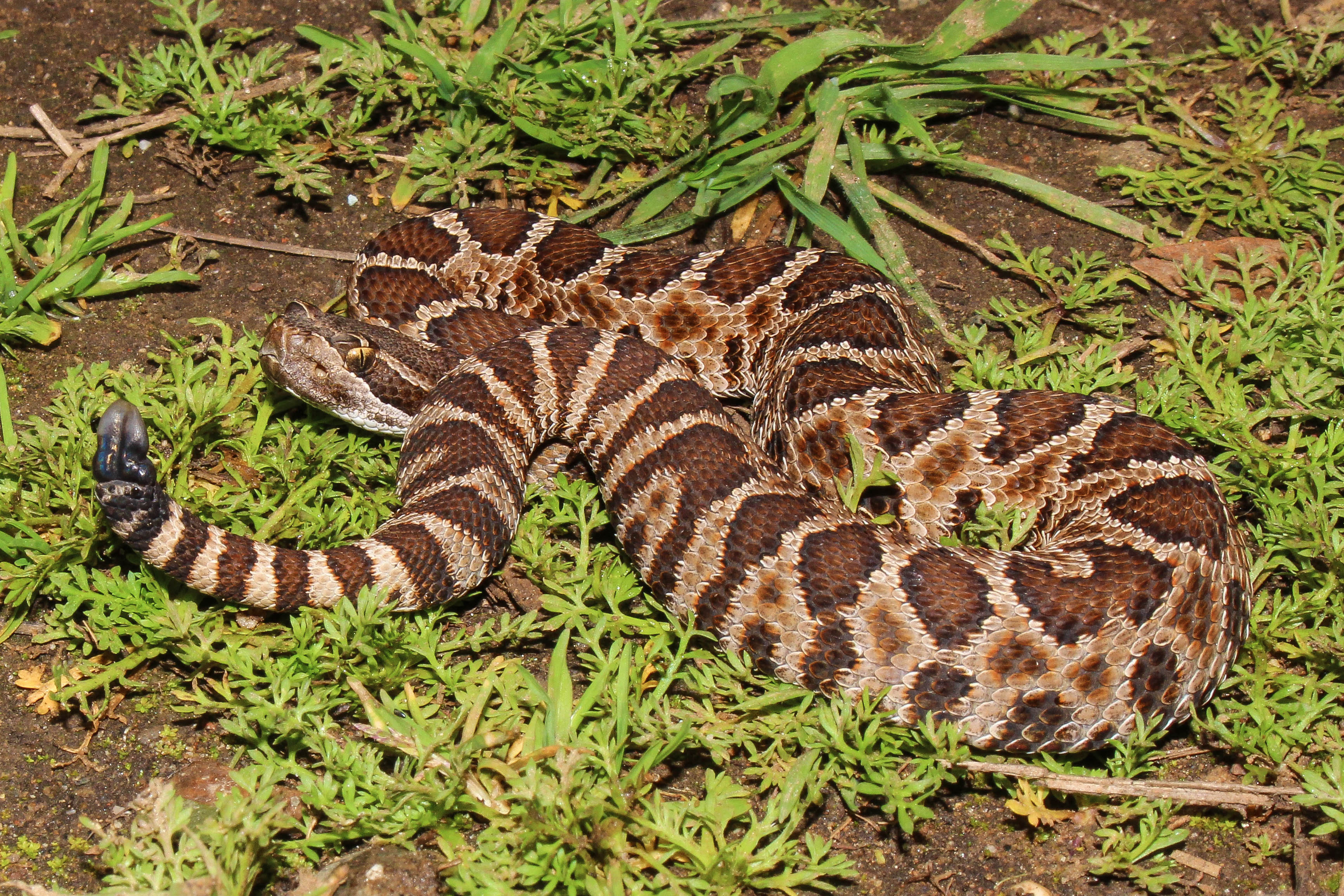
Juvenile Northern Pacific rattlesnake, Sacramento Co. California

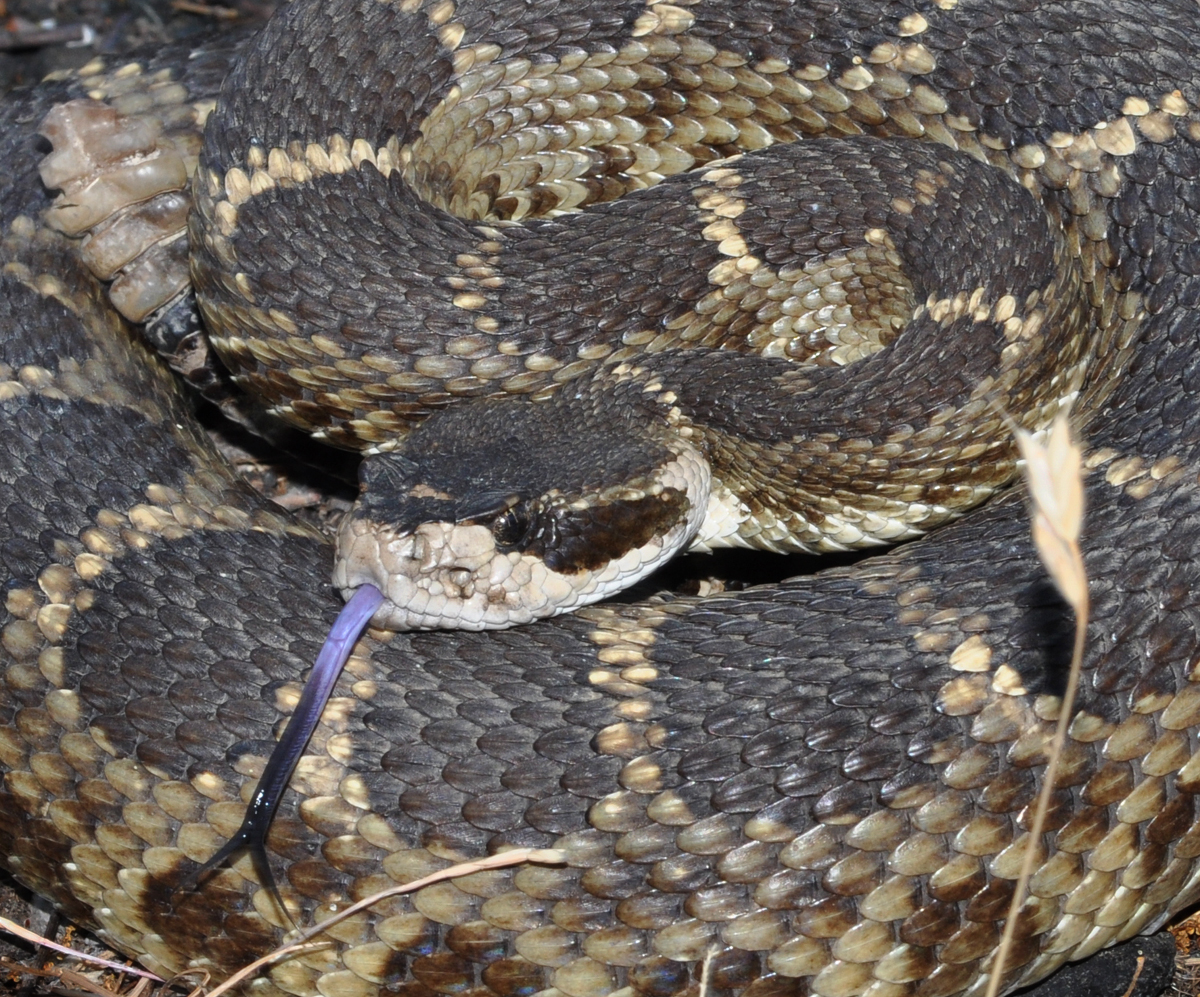
Adult Northern Pacific rattlesnake, Napa Co. California

== Common names ==
Efforts to standardize the common names of North American reptiles and amphibians began as early as 1956, and the name "Northern Pacific Rattlesnake" was applied to Crotalus viridis oreganus with wide acceptance. Following subsequent taxonomic changes, and depending on various taxonomic arrangements, the names "Northern Pacific Rattlesnake" or "Western Rattlesnake" have been applied with high levels of consistency and acceptance (largely depending on which arrangement, and recognition of subspecies if any, in the Crotalus viridis complex are followed), although occasionally appearing in slight variations, e.g. north Pacific rattlesnake. In addition, C. oreganus can be referred to as “California rattlesnake, Great Basin rattlesnake, Missouri rattlesnake, Oregon rattlesnake, black rattlesnake, black diamond rattlesnake, black snake, confluent rattlesnake, Hallowell’s rattlesnake, southern rattlesnake, western black rattlesnake, and western rattler.

== Subspecies ==
Crotalus oreganus has 6 recognized subspecies:

Image	Common Name	Scientific Name	Geographic Range	Note(s)
	Grand Canyon Rattlesnake	C. o. abyssus	This subspecies only resides in a small northern section of Arizona - around the Grand Canyon.	
	Coronado Island Rattlesnake	C. o. caliginis	South Coronado Island.	
	Midget Faded Rattlesnake	C. o. concolor	Eastern Utah, western Colorado, and a small section of southern Wyoming.	Whether it is a subspecies or a full species isn't agreed upon.
	Southern Pacific Rattlesnake	C. o. helleri	Southwest California, west Baja California, and a small section of northern Baja California Sur.	Whether it is a subspecies or a full species isn't agreed upon.
	Great Basin Rattlesnake	C. o. lutosus	Northwest Arizona, west Utah, Nevada, southern Idaho, southeast Oregon, northeast California, and a tiny section of western Wyoming.	Whether it is a subspecies or a full species isn't agreed upon.
	Northern Pacific Rattlesnake	C. o. oreganus	Northwest California, southwest and northeast Oregon, eastern Washington, a small section of western Idaho, and a small section of southern British Columbia.	

== Geographic range ==
It is found in North America from southwestern Canada, through much of the western half of the United States, to the Baja California Peninsula of Mexico. In Canada, it is found in southern interior of British Columbia and is one of only three remaining rattlesnake species in the country. In the United States, it occurs in Washington, Oregon, California, western and southern Idaho, Nevada, Utah, Arizona, western Colorado, and small parts of New Mexico and Wyoming. In Mexico, it occurs in Baja California and the northern extreme of Baja California Sur.

== Ecology and natural history ==
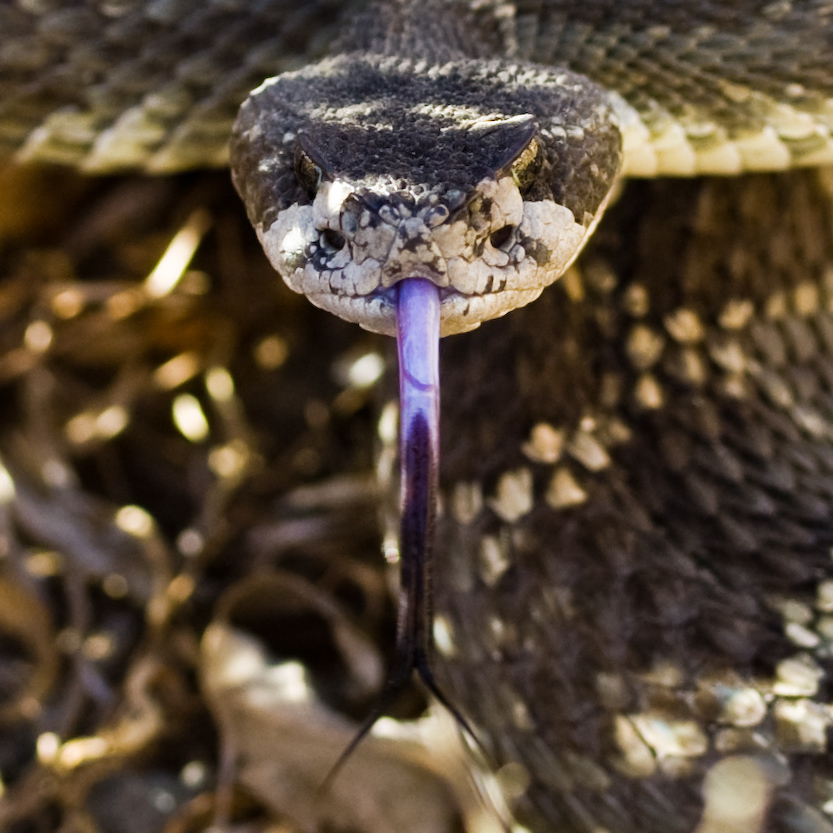
Showing tongue

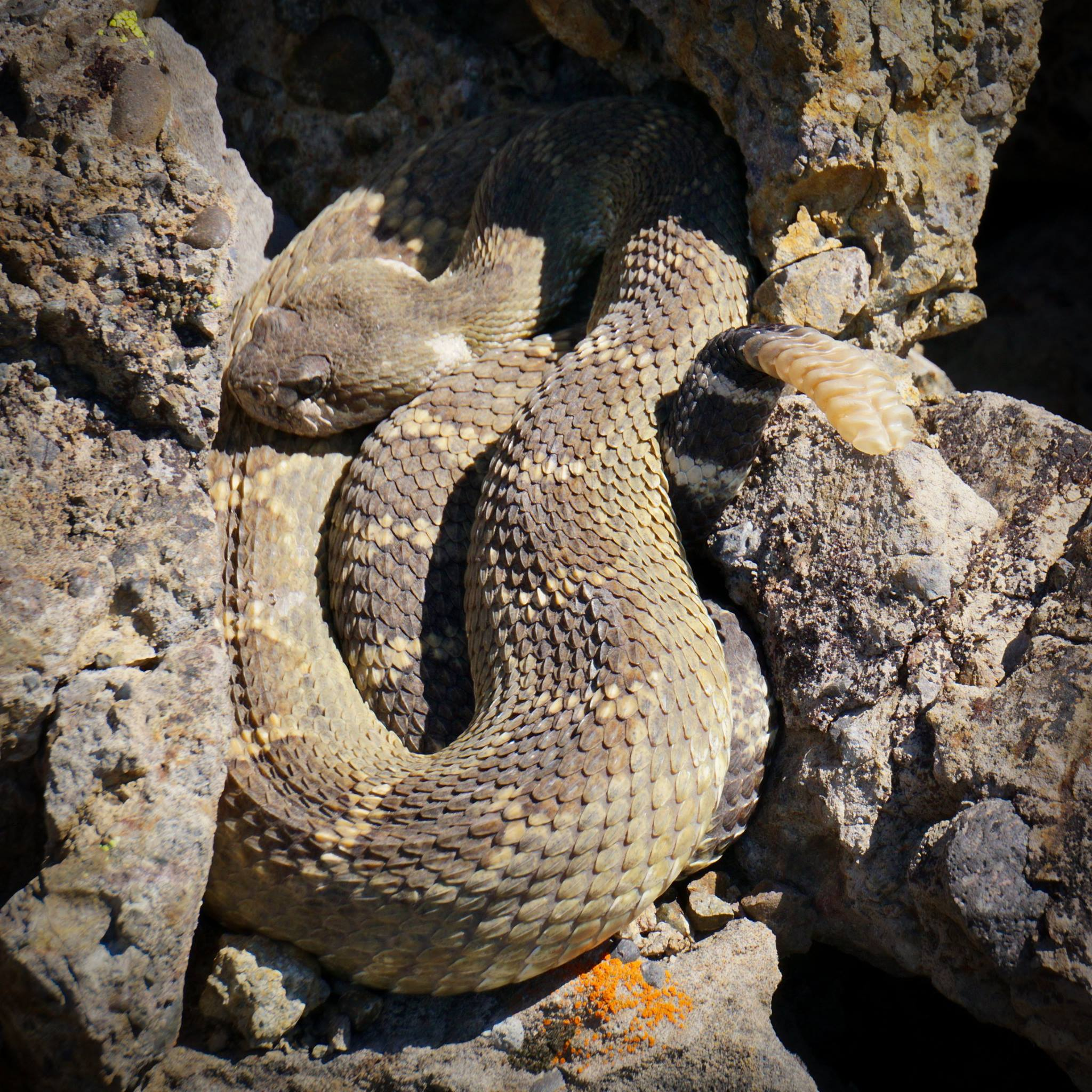
Wedged in between rocks while taking in the warmth of the sun.

=== Diet ===
Using its heat-sensing facial pits to locate prey, C. oreganus eats birds, bird eggs, and small mammals, from mice to rabbits. It also eats small reptiles and amphibians. The juveniles eat insects. Studies show that the diet of C. oreganus can significantly impact their size. For example it was found that there was a major size difference between snakes that eat lizards and snakes that eat birds and mammals (lizard based diet snakes were much smaller). Californian C. oreganus were found to have a higher proportion of lizard in their diet which may be correlated to the large population of lizards in the state.

=== Hunting habits and venom ===
In regards to its hunting habits, the C. oreganus utilizes its venom as its hunting strength. While quicker and stronger animals can initially escape from its grasp, the venom can induce paralysis, leading to C. oreganus being able to track down the prey. The C. oreganus venom possesses "hemotoxic" and "neurotoxic" properties leading to cardiovascular, internal bleeding, and headaches. The snakes' venom also seems to show a relationship between their diets and their resulting “venom phenotypes”. The “venom composition” of C. oreganus' venom changes "ontogenetically" with smaller snakes having more toxic venom.

=== Reproduction ===
Males reach sexual maturity in two to four years, with most reproducing for the first time in their third year. Females in contrast mature in three to seven years, with most first reproducing in their fourth year, however northern populations in British Columbia are known to first reproduce as late as their sixth, seventh, or eighth year. The reproductive cycle of females is normally biennial, although 10% may produce litters in two consecutive years, and one case of a three year interval has been reported. Crotalus oreganus typically mate in the spring after emerging from winter dormancy, although British Columbia populations have been reported to mate in the fall before dormancy. The gestation period was reported to be about 90 days in wild snakes from Idaho, but periods of 143 and 425 days have been reported for individuals in captivity. Females usually fast while they are gravid. They are viviparous, producing live young. Parturition of 1–15 (average 3–8) young usually occurs in August or September, with neonates ranging 19–28 cm. (average 25.2 cm.) in total length. One report of 25 young is regarded as questionable by some herpetologist.

Mating usually takes place in concealed areas, like burrows, crevices of rocks and logs, or dense brush. Mating snakes are highly sensitive to disturbance and are quick to separate.

=== Migration and habitat seeking ===
The species undertakes seasonal migrations between winter and summer habitats to adjust to prey availability. Specifically, the species migrates to find winter denning sites and foraging grounds for the summer In regards to the "hibernacula" that C. oreganus search for in the winter, studies show that the snakes may search for specific characteristics such as slope length and rock coverage. In comparison with random sites, the slopes of the hibernacula that C. oreganus choose are much steeper. These sites are often surrounded my medium sized rocks in contrast to small or large rocks that the terrain may possess.

Crotalus oreganus, Yosemite Falls

== Conservation status ==
This species was previously classified as Least Concern on the IUCN Red List of Threatened Species (v3.1, 2001). Species are listed as such due to their wide distribution, presumed large population, or because they are unlikely to be declining fast enough to qualify for listing in a more threatened category. The population trend was previously stable when assessed in 2007. However, in Canada, Crotalus oreganus is classified as threatened in the Committee on the Status of Endangered Wildlife in Canada as recently as 2015. The species was also classified as "Schedule 1" federally-threatened in Canda's “Species at Risk Act (SARA)”. This is due to rapid changes in the species habitat (dry southern-interior valleys) in British Columbia where human involvement has made a direct impact on population reduction. In addition, a direct negative correlation was discovered regarding body condition (mass per unit body length) and human activity in the region (British Columbia).
