= San Pedro Springs =

Coordinates: 29°26′48″N 98°30′06″W

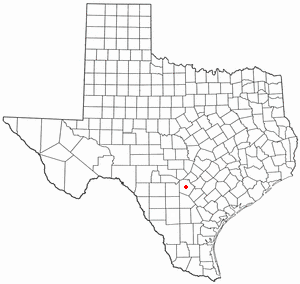
- Location of San Pedro Springs
- Interactive map of San Pedro Springs
- Location: San Antonio, Texas, U.S.A
- Spring source: Edwards Aquifer
- Elevation: 660 ft (200 m)
- Type: Karst springs
- Provides water for: San Pedro Creek, San Antonio River

San Pedro Springs is the name of a cluster of springs in Bexar County, Texas, United States. These springs provide water for San Pedro Creek, which flows into the San Antonio River. The San Antonio Springs also feed into the San Antonio River.

== Natural history ==
The San Pedro Springs are located in the Tobin Hill neighborhood of San Antonio, about 1.6 miles (2.6 km) north of Downtown San Antonio. Most of the springs are within San Pedro Springs Park, the oldest park in Texas. The springs are fed by water from the Edwards Aquifer; this water reaches the surface through faults along the Balcones Escarpment. There are 13 primary springs, but they seldom flow due to pumping demands on the Edwards Aquifer.

In addition to the association of groundwater availability with this locale along the Balcones Fault, the area is also considered an ecological dividing line for occurrence of some species; for example, the California Fan Palm, Washingtonia filifera occurs only at or west of San Pedro Springs, i.e. Balcones Fault zone.

== History ==
Artifacts from Paleo-Indian cultures have been found at the site of the San Pedro Springs, as well as just downstream at the former site of a small natural lake. These artifacts indicate that the springs were used more than 12,000 years ago. Later, a band of Coahuiltecan Indians, the Payaya people, lived near the springs and called their village Yanaguana ("place of refreshing waters").

The springs were named by Father Isidro Félix de Espinosa, a Spanish missionary, in 1709; but some scholars believe Álvar Núñez Cabeza de Vaca may have camped at the springs in 1535. That would make the springs one of the oldest historical sites in North America and the second oldest park in America, behind only Boston Common.

In 1718 Governor Martín de Alarcón established a settlement he called Villa de Béxar near the headwaters of San Pedro Creek, but civilian settlement did not materialize. Also, in 1718, another Spanish missionary, Antonio de San Buenaventura y Olivares, built a mission nearby the fort at San Pedro Springs that he named San Antonio de Valero. This was the first permanent European settlement in San Antonio.

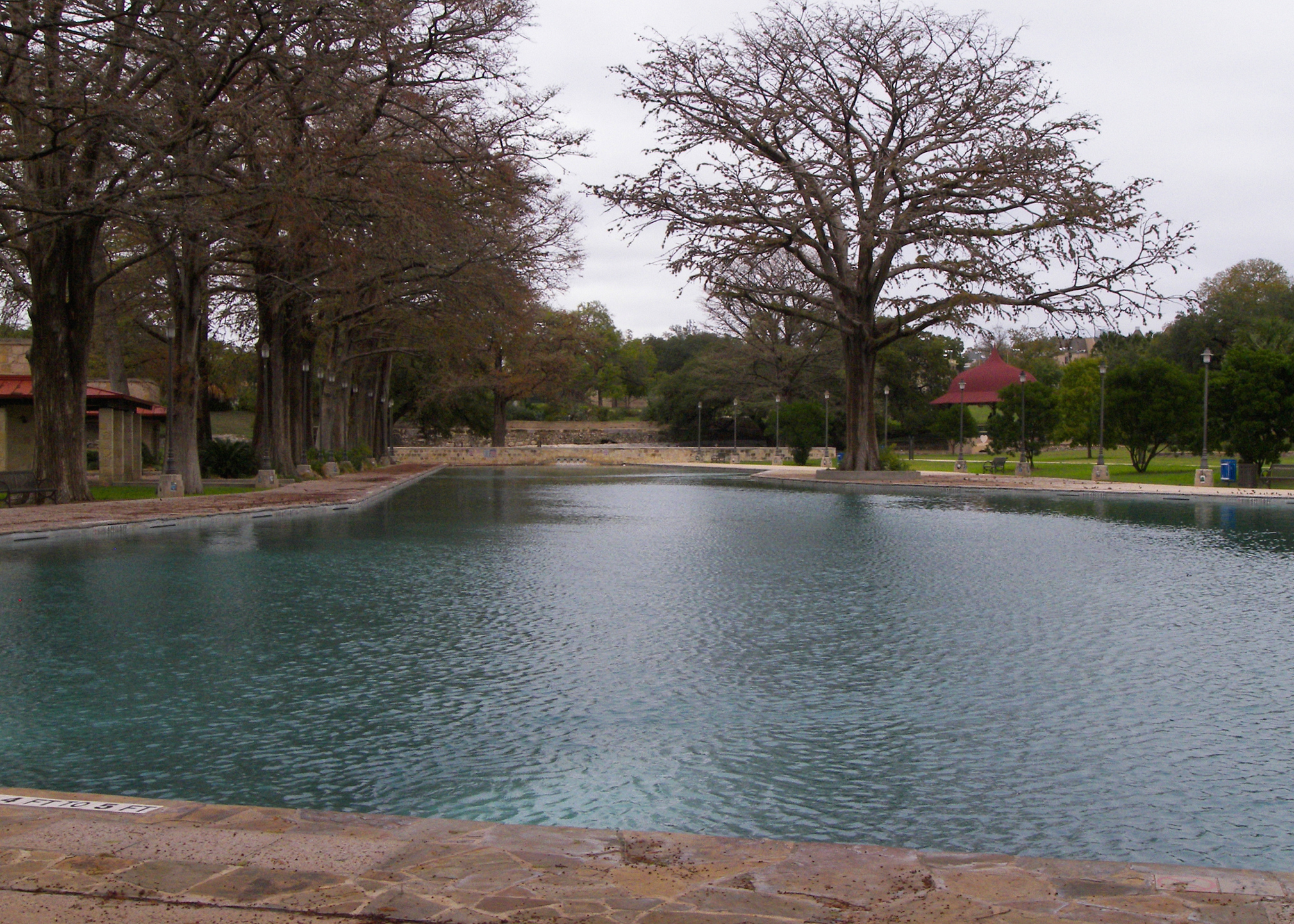
San Pedro Park swimming pool or lake, in 2011.

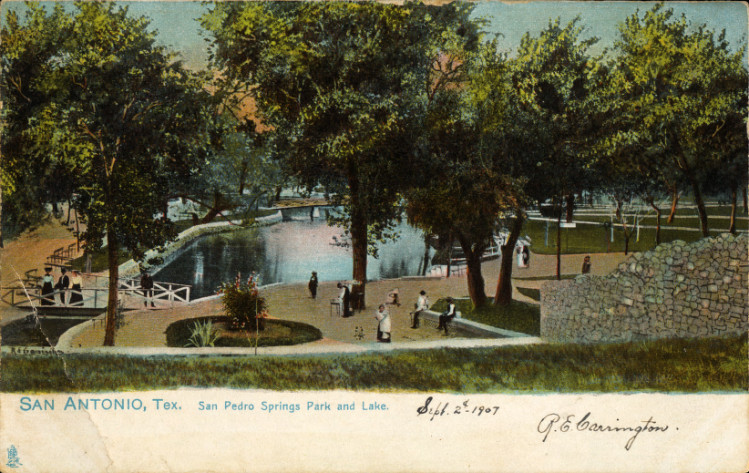
San Pedro Springs Park and Lake, San Antonio, Texas (postcard, circa 1907)

In the 1730s, an acequia was built to carry water from the springs toward the city for irrigation and household use. By the 1870s, the springs provided water for boating, fishing, and swimming.

A municipal swimming pool was built in the park in 1922; it was replaced in 1954 and again in 2000.

== See also ==
- Acequia Madre de Valero
- San Antonio Springs
