= San Pedro Springs Park =

- U.S. National Register of Historic Places
- Recorded Texas Historic Landmark
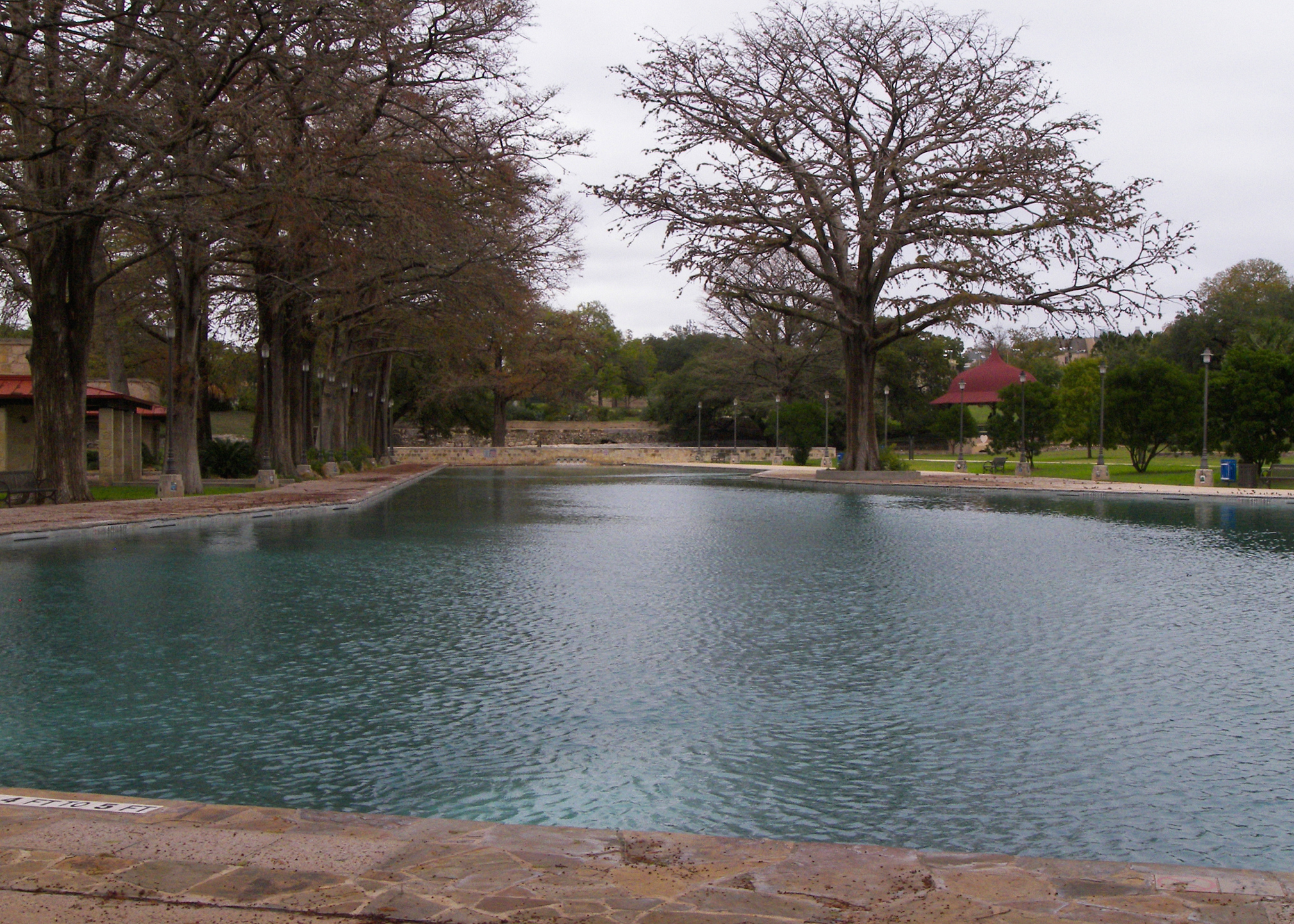
- San Pedro Springs Park

- Location within Texas Location within the United States
- Location: 1415 San Pedro Avenue; San Antonio, Texas
- Coordinates: 29°26′49″N 98°30′06″W
- NRHP reference No.: 79002916
- RTHL No.: 3806

Significant dates
- Added to NRHP: November 1, 1979
- Designated RTHL: 1965

San Pedro Springs Park is located in the Bexar County city of San Antonio in the U.S. state of Texas. Surrounding the source of the springs, the 46-acre park is the oldest in the state of Texas. It is the location of a Payaya Indian village known as Yanaguana, and is the original site of the city of San Antonio. The park is alternately known as San Pedro Park. The park was designated a Recorded Texas Historic Landmark in 1965. It was added to the National Register of Historic Places listings in Bexar County, Texas on November 1, 1979.

Although it is often stated that it is the second oldest city park in the United States after Boston Common, it is at most the tenth oldest after Plaza de la Constitución in San Augustine, Florida among others.

== History, first European contact, founding of San Antonio ==
Archaeological findings have uncovered evidence that human presence in the area dates back 12,000 years. The earliest recorded inhabitants of the springs were the Payaya people, who referred to their village as Yanaguana . Spanish Franciscian priest Damián Massanet led the first European contact with the area, a military expedition in 1691. In 1709, Spanish Franciscan missionary Isidro de Espinosa and a retinue of Spanish soldiers traveled to the area. In his diary, Espinoza described the springs in detail and noted they had named it Agua de San Pedro (Waters of Saint Peter). Martín de Alarcón founded the city of San Antonio by establishing San Antonio de Valero and Presidio San Antonio de Bexar at the Springs in 1718. He built an acequia (irrigation canal) in 1719. The springs and surrounding area were designated as public land by King Philip V of Spain in 1729. When the Canary Islanders began arriving in 1731, they first camped in this area.

== The park ==
Based on the original Spanish land grant, the city of San Antonio's first surveyor Francois P. Giraud defined the park's boundaries in 1851. The city officially declared it a public park in 1852, making it the oldest park in the state of Texas. By 1856, the U.S. Camel Corps had camel stables on the site. In 1860, Sam Houston stopped here to deliver a two-hour speech opposing the proposed Texas secession from the United States. During the Civil War the park was used as a prisoner of war camp. After the Civil War, Buffalo Soldiers used the park as a training camp.

Swiss landscape designer John J. Duerler leased land adjacent to the park, and reached an 1864 agreement with the city to redesign the park. Duerler developed the park with landscaping, a garden, picnic areas, a zoo and aviary, a music pavilion, and even a racetrack. Naturalist Gustave Jermy opened the Museum of Natural History in the park in 1885. The park suffered in 1891 when wells dug into the Edwards Aquifer dwindled the park's water supply. Between 1897 and 1899, the park was renovated under the direction of Mayor Bryan Callaghan. Beginning just before World War II, the water needs of a burgeoning population once again decreased water levels, drying up the springs for the next 35 years. When excessive rainfalls during the 1990s replenished the park's water supply, the public once again became interested in the park. The park underwent an additional renovation 1998-2000.

Park facilities include a gazebo, swimming pool, restrooms, tennis courts, a playground, a skate plaza, the San Pedro Library, and the San Pedro Playhouse.

== Gallery ==
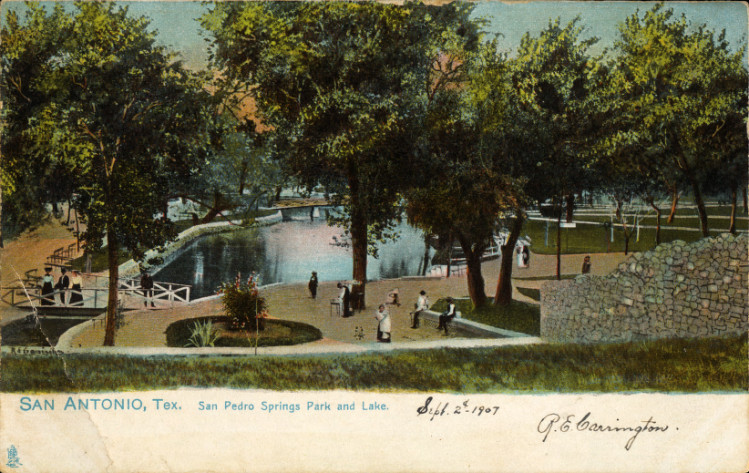
1907 Postcard, San Pedro Springs Park and Lake

== See also ==
- Acequia Madre de Valero
