= Yanaguana (San Antonio) =

Native American village

Coordinates: 29.446199°N 98.499381°W

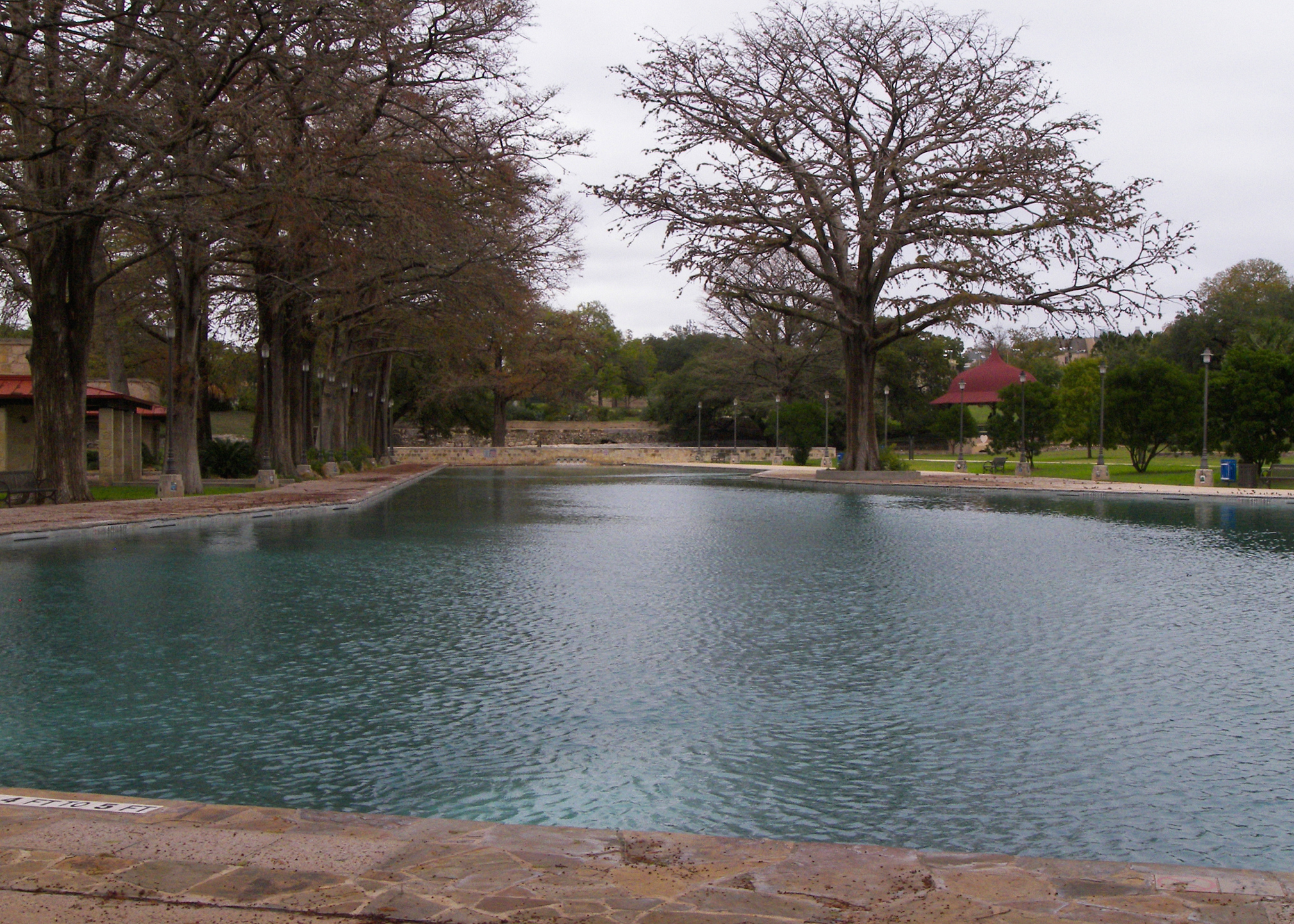
Site of Yanaguana

Yanaguana was a Payaya village in the geographical area that became the city of San Antonio, in Bexar County, Texas. Some accounts believe the Payaya also referred to the San Antonio River as Yanaguana, and it is sometimes promoted as such for the tourist industry. For a number of years, the city of San Antonio contracted with Yanaguana Cruises Inc. for an exclusive monopoly to operate tour barges on a select section of the river. The National Park Service has a designated "Yanaguana Trail" that runs along the river at Mission San Juan Capistrano. In 1933 Frederick C. Chabot of San Antonio formed the Yanaguana Society, specifically named for the Payaya village, to collect and preserve the early artifacts and history of the area. The organization lasted through 1960.

The first recorded European contact with the village occurred when Spanish Franciscan priest Damián Massanet led a military expedition through the area. Massanet wrote in the June 13, 1691 entry to his diary that he had named the area San Antonio de Padua, but that the Payaya they encountered had called their village Yanaguana. The priest detailed a great variety of trees, abundant waters and fishing opportunities, and particularly noted the wild chickens at Yanaguana. The Payaya were a nomadic Coahuiltecan band who camped at Yanaguana for the very reasons Massanet mentioned in his diary. The natural bounty of the area met their needs for sustaining their village. In 1709, Spanish Franciscan missionary Isidro de Espinosa renamed the area Agua de San Pedro (Waters of San Pedro). The city of San Antonio created San Pedro Springs Park out of Yanaguana in 1852.

At Yanaguana in 1718, Martín de Alarcón founded the city of San Antonio by establishing San Antonio de Valero on the west side of the springs, and Presidio San Antonio de Bexar. On May 1, 1718, Alarcón turned over possession of the "..mission at the site of the Indian village on the banks of the San Antonio River ..." to Franciscan priest Antonio de Olivares. In 1729, King Philip V of Spain decreed the area public land. The mission that began as huts was moved to the other side of the river a year later. In 1724, the mission was moved to its current location south of the springs, at what is now known as Alamo Plaza.

== See also ==
- Acequia Madre de Valero
