= Guerrero, Coahuila =

City in the Mexican state of Coahuila

Guerrero
- Municipal seat and city
- Location in Mexico
- Coordinates: 28°18′30″N 100°22′37″W
- Country: Mexico
- State: Coahuila
- Municipality: Guerrero
- Elevation: 216 m (709 ft)

Population (2010)
  - Total: 959

Guerrero is a city and seat of the municipality of Guerrero, in the north-eastern Mexican state of Coahuila. The 2010 census population was reported as 959 inhabitants.

== San Juan Bautista missions ==
In the early 1700s, a series of Christian missions collectively known as the San Juan Bautista missions were founded in and around Guerrero, primarily as a means of converting indigenous peoples, including the Ervipiame, to Christianity. The first was Mission San Juan Bautista. Originally founded in 1699 by Antonio de Olivares and Francisco Hidalgo at a site 25 miles north of Lampazos in Nuevo León on the Sabinas River, it was relocated to Guerrero on January 1, 1700. The second was Mission San Francisco Solano, founded 1700, and the third, Mission San Bernardo, was founded in spring 1702. The ruins of these missions remain as sites of archaeological interest. The mission complex was designated a Pueblos Mágicos site in 2015.

In 1703 a presidio, or fort, was established at San Juan Bautista.
