= San Antonio Municipal Archives =

The San Antonio Municipal Archives are the official archives of the city of San Antonio, Texas. They are a division of the Office of the City Clerk.

The mission of the archives is to arrange, describe, preserve, and provide access to archival materials that document the history of San Antonio. They are accessible by appointment only.

== Description ==
The archives include over 300 separate collections of records created by the city. In addition to printed materials, the archives also contain audio/visual materials, electronic records, gifts given to the city, maps, and photographs. Among the highlights of the collections are the first governmental meeting records from Bejar, which date to the 1770s; the architectural plans for the Alamo; an 1895 letter sent by Mexican president Porfirio Díaz; and one of the oldest maps of the city, which documents the area within a one-mile (1.6 km) radius from the Cathedral of San Fernando.

== History ==
The archives were founded in 2005 by City Clerk Leticia M. Vacek. Vacek also led the creation of the archives' digital collection, which was debuted in 2007 and provides access to digitized materials via the Municipal Archives & Records Digital Repository. Vacek retired in March 2020 after serving 16 years as City Clerk, during which time she managed the entire Office of the City Clerk, which includes the Archives Division as well as the Legislative Division, Passport Division, Records Management Division, and Vital Records Division. The Office of the City Clerk has an annual budget of approximately $4 million.

Prior to being named the university archivist at the University of Texas at San Antonio Libraries in January 2010, Sean Heyliger served as the assistant archivist at the San Antonio Municipal Archives.

The archives have received grant funding, including grants from the Alamo Area Council of Governments, the National Historical Publications and Records Commission, and the San Antonio Conservation Society.
