= Johann and Anna Heidgen House =

Historic house in Texas, United States

- U.S. National Register of Historic Places
- Recorded Texas Historic Landmark
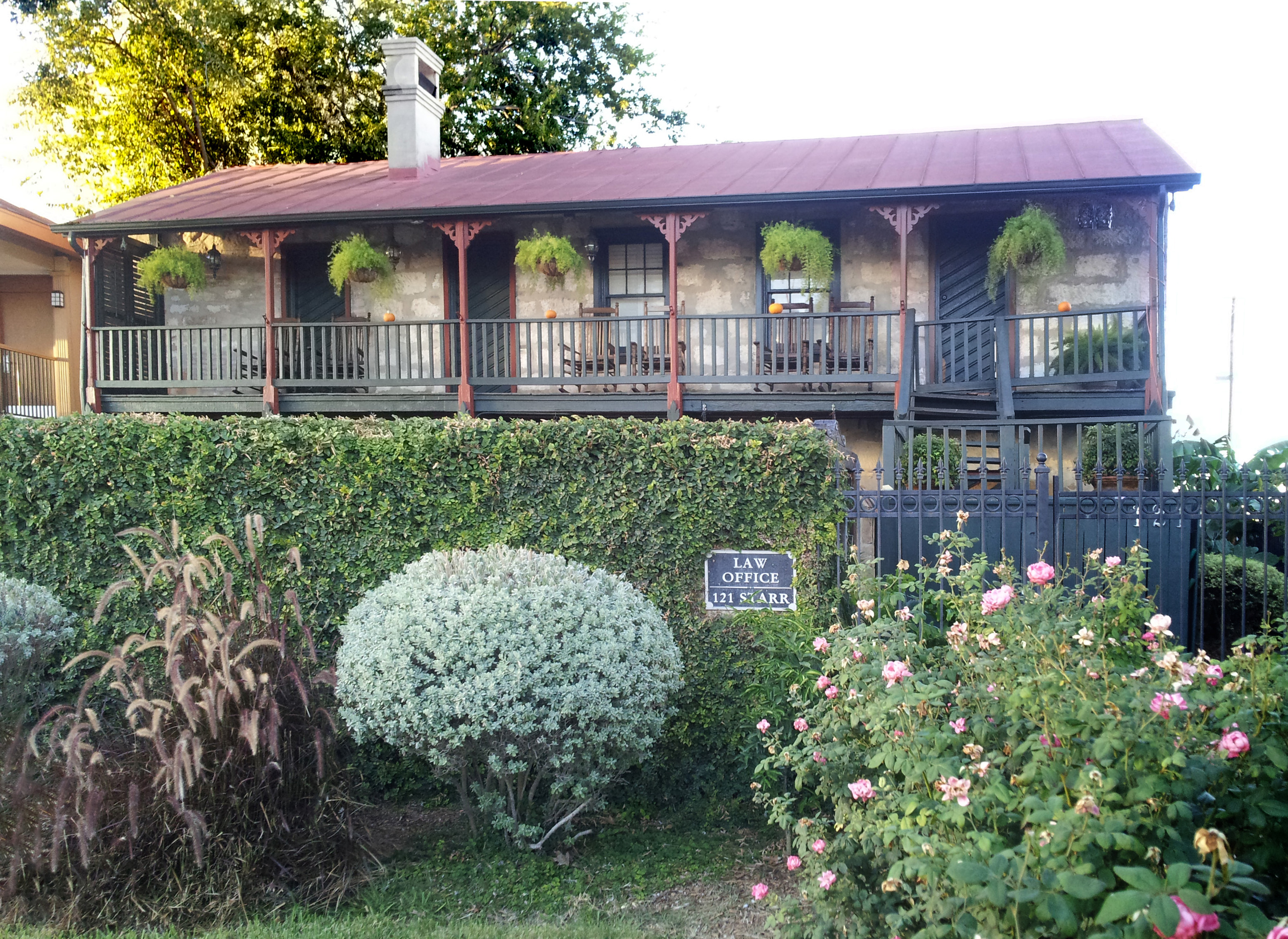

- Location within Texas Location within the United States
- Location: 121 Starr. San Antonio, Texas
- Coordinates: 29°25′34″N 98°28′56″W
- NRHP reference No.: 04000591
- RTHL No.: 12947

Significant dates
- Added to NRHP: June 9, 2004
- Designated RTHL: 2003

The Johann and Anna Heidgen House is located in the Bexar County city of San Antonio in the U.S. state of Texas. It is listed on the National Register of Historic Places listings in Bexar County, Texas. The structure was designated a Recorded Texas Historic Landmark in 2003. It is also known as the Heidgen-Zilker House. The house was built circa 1882 and has been used for a variety of purposes, including as a residence, as a youth organization facility, attorney's office, wedding venue, and at one time as a restaurant.

== House details ==
The two-story rock house is constructed of 16-inch thick native limestone and local caliche blocks. The original structure was painted with a lime wash. A gabled roof and covered porches are two additional features. One perpendicular wall connects to a section of the 18th century Acequia Madre de Valero. That 1718 initial phase of a 45-mile acequia irrigation system was laid out among the early missions by the Spanish Franciscan priests and the Payaya people. This feature was a contributing factor in this house being placed on the National Register of Historic Place Listings.

== Ownership history ==
German immigrant Johann Heidgen, a stonemason, built this house at 121 Starr Street, three blocks northeast of the Alamo, circa 1882. He and his wife Anna Barbara moved to San Antonio in 1852. The couple had thirteen children, eight of whom lived to adulthood. The Heidgen family sold the house to Meta and F.A.Folkman in 1907, who in turn sold it to John Francis Krauser. Two years later, Krauser sold it to San Antonio businessman Charles A. Zilker and his wife Pearl Zilker. Because of the Zilker ownership, the house is sometimes known as the Heidgen-Zilker House. It was inherited by their children as part of a family trust. The Zilker heirs used it as rental property, rather than live in it themselves. The heirs donated the property to the San Antonio Conservation Society (SACS) in 1968.

SACS deeded the property and its preservation easement two years later to the Alamo Council of Camp Fire Girls and Boys in 1970. SACS supplemented the gift with a $7,000 restoration grant. That grant was in turn supplemented by an additional $35,000 grant from the non-profit Ewing Halsell Foundation. The architectural firm of Peterson and Williams designed the improvements, and the Mexico-based contractor was Mr. Lerma. The work included a new stairway and a new right-side front landing. A southern half brick wall was included in the restoration. Doors and windows were replaced, and mortar and stone work were repaired. A new chimney was built, and the interior of the house was completely redone.

That particular Camp Fire council disbanded in 1987 and deeded the property back to SACS, who in turn sold it. After a succession of subsequent owners and a stint as a restaurant, the structure was bought by attorney T. Russell Noe in 2002, and is currently in use as his San Antonio office.
