= Juan Arricivita =

Juan Arricivita was a Catholic missionary.

He was a native of Mexico in the eighteenth century. Little more is known of his life than that he was Prefect and Commissary of the College of Propaganda Fide, at Querétaro, in New Spain (Mexico), a missionary, and a member of the Franciscan Order.

Arricivita was the author of the second volume of the Chronicles of Querétaro (continuing the work of Isidro de Espinosa). The Chronicles give an account of the missions and colonization of northwestern Mexico, including the modern-day U.S. states of Arizona and California.
