= Antonio de Olivares =

Spanish franciscan

Antonio De Olivares
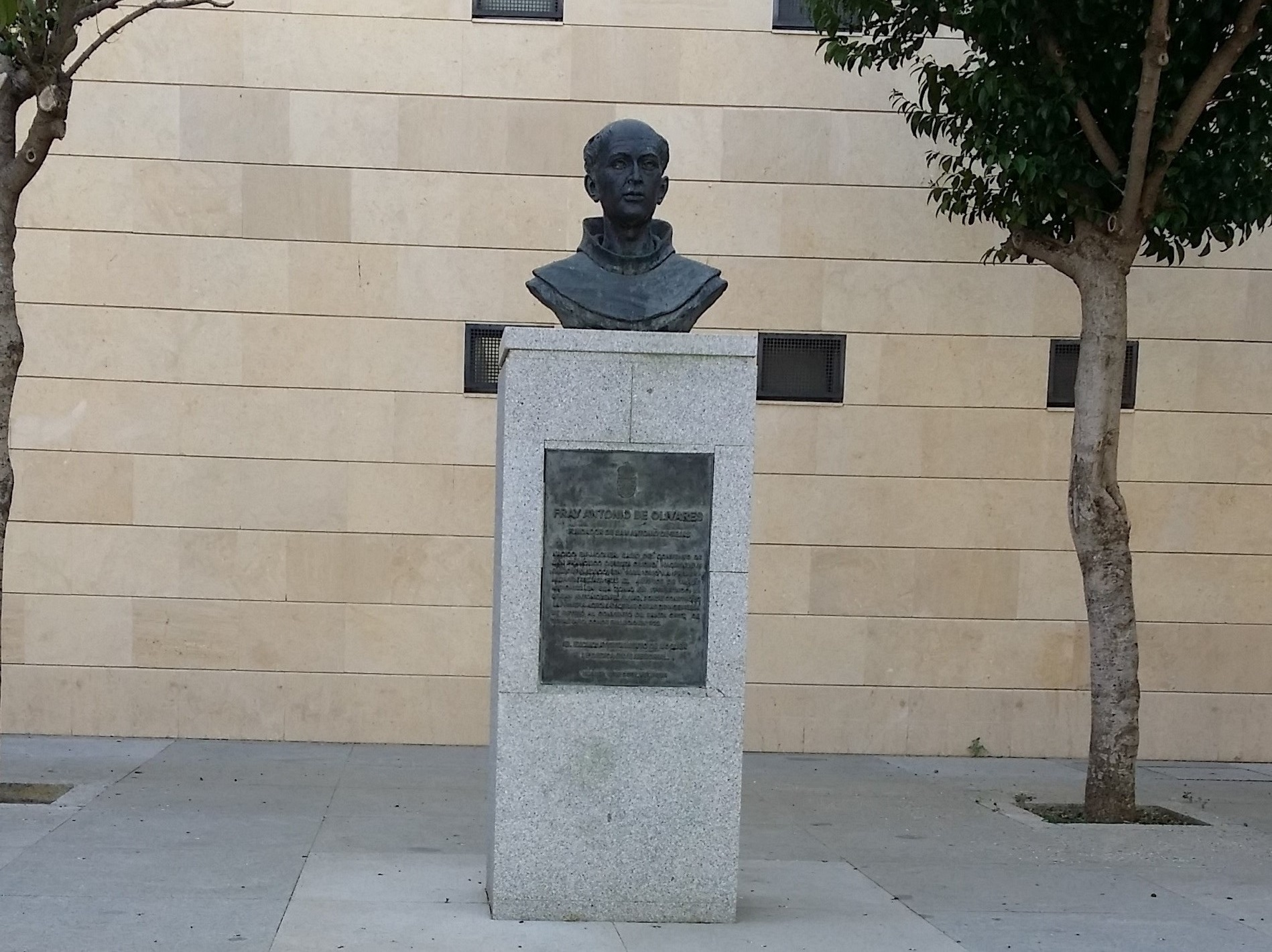
- Monument to Fray Antonio de Olivares in Moguer
- Born: Antonio de San Buenaventura y Olivares; 1630; Moguer, Andalusia, Spain
- Died: 1722 (aged 91–92); Querétaro, Mexico
- Occupation: Franciscan

Antonio de San Buenaventura y Olivares or simply Fray Antonio de Olivares (1630–1722) was a Spanish Franciscan who officiated at the first Catholic Mass celebrated in Texas, and he was known for contributing to the founding of San Antonio and to the prior exploration of the area. He founded, among other missions, the Alamo Mission in San Antonio (better known as simply the Alamo), the Presidio San Antonio de Bexar, and the Acequia Madre de Valero.

== Biography ==
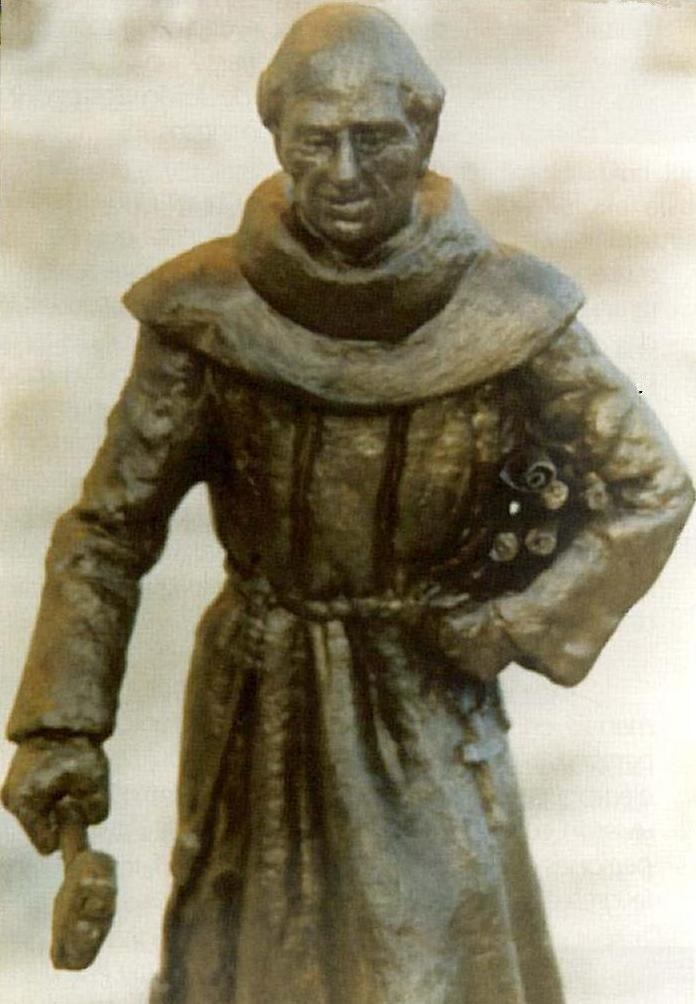
Monument to Antonio de Olivares in Texas

=== Early career ===
Antonio de San Buenaventura y Olivares was born in Moguer, Andalusia, Spain, in 1630 and studied at the Franciscan convent of San Francisco de Moguer.

In 1665, at the age of thirty-five years old, he went on a religious expedition to the Americas, along with 19 other religious. Once in Americas, in the Convent of Querétaro, he received the training he needed to engage with the natives, in their work of evangelization. It was this monastery from which they went on various expeditions in Texas, since this was a strategically important place for the crown. In 1675 Fray Antonio de Olivares, Fray Francisco Hidalgo, Fray Juan Larios and Fernando del Bosque were sent to explore the region beyond the Rio Grande, to assess the possibility for new settlements in the area.

On January 1, 1699, Olivares was chosen to go along with Marcos de Guereña of the College of Santa Cruz de Querétaro to work in northern Coahuila, in present-day Mexico. There in San Juan Bautista, located in those times on the Río de Sabinas, the priests joined Father Francisco Hidalgo and on January 1, 1700, participated in the founding of Mission San Juan Bautista, located in the present Guerrero, Coahuila.

On March 1, 1700, Olivares founded in the valley of the Circumcision the mission of San Bernardo and Mission San Francisco Solano, 5 miles (8.0 km) from the Rio Grande in Coahuila, Mexico. Today's municipality of Guerrero is the approximate location of the mission. In 1706 he was appointed guardian of the College of Santa Cruz de Querétaro, where he remained three years.

=== San Antonio ===
In 1709, he participated in the expedition headed by Pedro de Aguirre. Together with Fray Isidro de Espinosa, they explored the territory from the modern-day city of San Antonio to the Colorado River. The same year he traveled to Spain to convince the authorities of the importance of maintaining and establishing new missions on the banks of the San Antonio River, in present San Antonio. He remained in Spain six years.

In 1716, Fray Antonio wrote to the Viceroy of New Spain, Baltasar de Zúñiga y Guzmán, telling him their hopes and plans for the future mission, and urged him to send families of settlers to found a town. In the same letter he stressed that it was necessary that some of these families be skilled in the useful arts and industries, "to teach the Indians all that should be required to be useful and capable citizens." The perseverance of Fray Antonio was answered, as the Viceroyalty gave formal approval for the mission in late 1716, assigning responsibility for its establishment to Martín de Alarcón, the governor of Coahuila y Tejas.

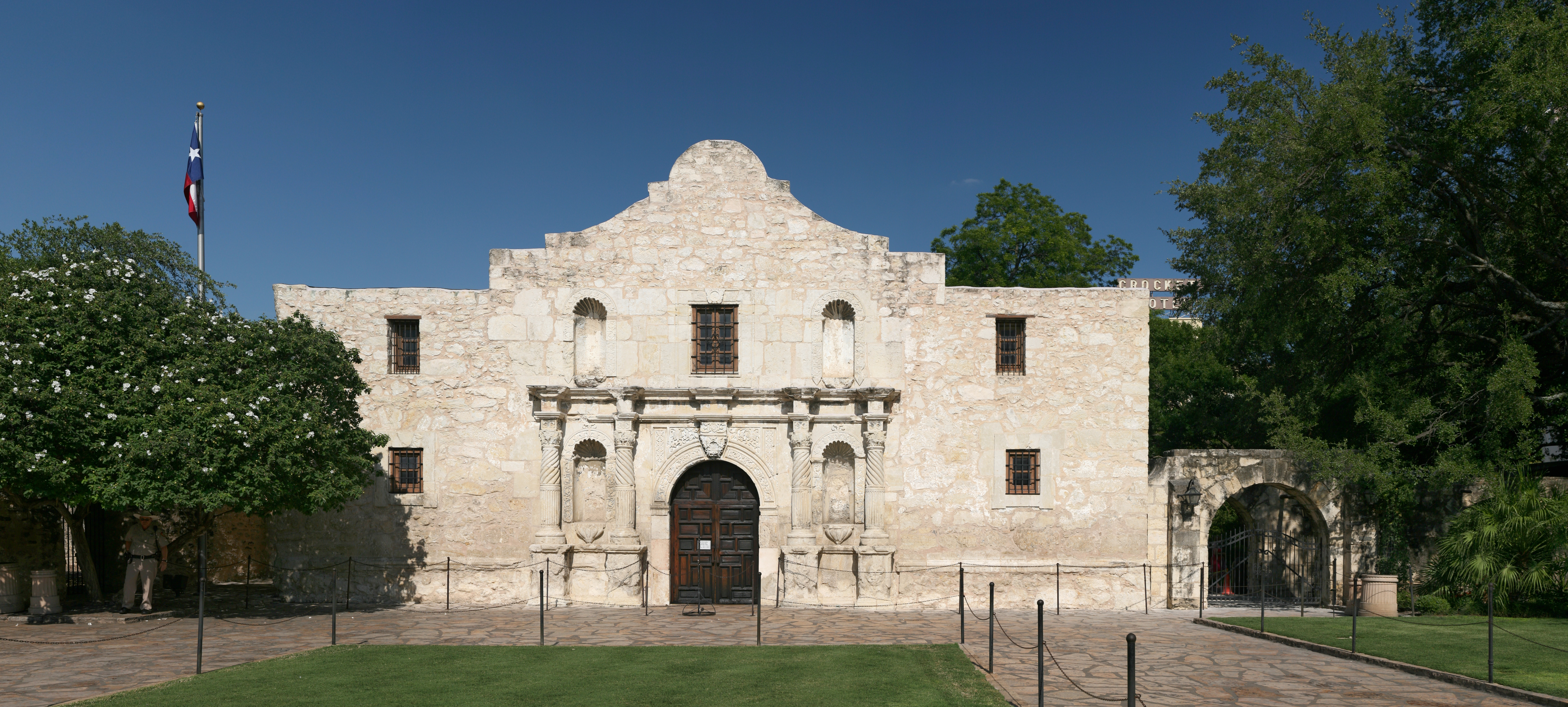
Misión de San Antonio de Valero, San Antonio (Texas)

Fray Antonio de Olivares organized the founding of the new mission from the adjacent Mission San Francisco Solano, often meeting with the Indians of the area (Payaya Indians) in his travels, gradually earning their love and respect. He was part of the expedition which made first contact with the Pastia Indians and helped recruit them to help in the construction of the San Antonio missions. He remained at the site of the mission for some time, organizing everything with the Indians, and they constructed a straw structure with branches and mud near the head of the San Antonio River. This mission was called San Antonio de Valero, a name derived from "San Antonio de Padua" and Viceroy of New Spain, Marquess of Valero. The mission was located near a community of Coahuiltecan and was originally inhabited by about four indigenous tribes people converted from Mission San Francisco Solano.

Unfortunately, his work was suspended for some time from an accident he had while crossing a bridge. The foot of the animal he was riding slipped into a hole, causing him to fall violently to the ground and break his leg. When he could walk again, the mission had changed its location to the west bank of the river, where floods were less likely. On orders of his religious order, Fray Antonio de Olivares transferred the Mission San Francisco Solano to the new mission of San Antonio de Valero.

He also built the Presidio San Antonio de Bexar, on the west side of the San Antonio River approximately 1 mile from the mission. It was designed to protect the system of missions and civilian settlements in central Texas and to ensure Spanish claims in the region against possible encroachment from other European powers. The presidium consisted of an adobe building, thatched with grass, with soldiers quartered in brush huts. Settlers concentrated around the complex and mission began to form the town of Bejar or Bexar. As the bulwark of Spanish Texas, located in the center of several operating missions, Bejar escaped the anxieties of other settlements. Resisting occasional Indian attacks, it became the main unit of walled defense.

The operational complex was completed with the construction of the first canal in Texas (Acequia Madre de Valero), 6 miles long, built to irrigate 400 hectares and supply of the inhabitants of the new facilities. It was vital to the missions to be able to divert and control water from the San Antonio River, in order to grow crops and to supply water to the people in the area. This particular aqueduct was the beginning of a much wider water system. Acequia Madre de Valero ran from the area currently known as Brackenridge Park southward to what is now Hemisfair Plaza and South Alamo Street. Part of it that is not viewable by the public runs beneath the Menger Hotel. The aqueduct was restored in 1968 and that year was designated a Recorded Texas Historic Landmark.

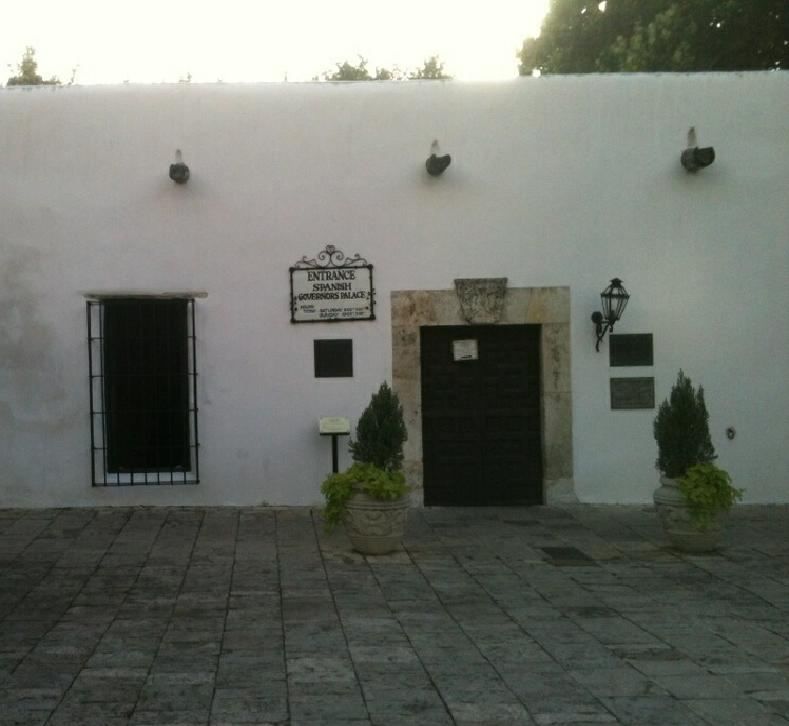
Presidio San Antonio de Bexar, San Antonio (Texas).

Fray Antonio de Olivares was aided by Payaya Indians to build the bridge that connected the Misión de San Antonio de Valero and Presidio San Antonio de Bexar, and the Acequia Madre de Valero.

On May 1, 1718, according to a certified statement Don Martin de Alarcon gave Fray Antonio de Olivares possession of the Misión de San Antonio de Valero, later known as "The Alamo".

On May 5 Presidio San Antonio de Bexar was founded on the west side of the San Antonio River, from which comes the present city of San Antonio, Texas. The event, chaired by Martin de Alarcón, settled around 30 families in the surrounding area.

On July 8, 1718, the first baptism was held at the new Mission San Antonio de Valero, as reflected in the mission's baptismal register.

In 1719, Margil obtained permission from the Marqués de San Miguel de Aguayo to found a second mission at San Antonio, and Father Olivares opposed it. Despite this, the Zacatecan Franciscans founded Mission San José y San Miguel de Aguayo next to the San Antonio River on February 23, 1720.

On September 8, 1720, after suffering a broken leg and worse health, Olivares retired from Mission Valero. He returned to the monastery of Querétaro where he died in 1722.

== See also ==
- Moguer, Andalusia, Spain
- Alamo Mission in San Antonio
- Presidio San Antonio de Bexar
- Acequia Madre de Valero
- Mission San José y San Miguel de Aguayo
- San Antonio
- Spanish Texas

== Sources ==
- DIAZ DEL CASTILLO, Bernal: Historia verdadera de la conquista de nueva España. Madrid, 1975 (History of the Conquest of New Spain. Madrid, 1975).
- ROPERO REGIDOR, Diego. Franciscanos andaluces de la tierra de Huelva en Indias. Universidad de Sevilla, 1985 (Franciscans of the land of Huelva, Andalusia in the Indies. Universidad de Sevilla, 1985)
- DOMINGUEZ, Maria Esther: San Antonio, Tejas, en la época colonial (1718–1821). Ediciones de Cultura Hispánica, 1989 (San Antonio, Texas, during the colonial period. Ediciones de Cultura Hispánica, 1989)
- ROPERO REGIDOR, Diego. Franciscanos de Moguer en América. Col. "Montemayor", Archivo Histórico Municipal; Fundación Municipal Cultura, Moguer, 2007(Moguer Franciscans in America. Col. "Montemayor", Municipal Archives, Municipal Cultural Foundation, Moguer, 2007).
