= Pastia people =

Historical Indigenous people from Texas, U.S.

Pastia
Paxti

Total population
- extinct as a distinct people since the 19th-century

Regions with significant populations
- southeastern Tejas

Languages
- Coahuilteco variant

Related ethnic groups
- Coahuiltecan, Pampopa, Payaya

The Pastia people (also Pastias, Paxti; Spanish: "chamuscados") (Note: Text quote: Apparently, because of editorial oversight, no formal entry for the Pastia Indians was included in F[rederick] W. Hodge's Handbook of American Indians (1910), and this has led to confusion about their ethnic identity. See The Handbook of Texas.) were a historical hunter-gatherer tribe of Coahuiltecan people. The Pastias lived south of San Antonio, Texas, mainly between the Medina and San Antonio Rivers and the southward bend of the Nueces River running through present-day La Salle and McMullen counties. They first encountered Spanish explorers in the early 18th century, and were extinct as an ethnic group by the middle of the following century.

== Territory ==
Early Spanish explorers encountered several ethnically distinct bands of Indigenous peoples near the Medina River who spoke a common Coahuiltecan dialect. These tribes also shared similar societal values and traditions. This group included the Anxau, Pampopa, Pastia, Payaya, and others. The largest of these groups was the Payaya, known to the Spanish since 1690 and considered quite friendly. The Pastia (or Paxti) Indians were unknown to the Spanish explorers of the 15th, 16th, and 17th centuries. The area under their influence was centered along the lower Frio River's confluence with the Nueces (in an area later called Nueva Extremadura in New Spain). The Pastia lands overlapped largely with the Pampopa tribal lands. Their homeland was well removed from the usual northern Spanish trade routes and trails leading into Tejas. For that reason, the Pastia and Spanish had no contact until the early 18th century. When the Espinosa-Olivares-Aguirre expedition—Spain's initial excursion to explore the area of the San Antonio River valley—crossed the Medina on April 24, 1709, they encountered the Pastia tribe for the first time.

== Names ==
The name, Pastias, is equivalent to "chamuscados" in Spanish, translated as the "scorched," "seared," or "singed" peoples. This name may be a reference to the tattooing, body painting, and body ornamentation favored by the Pastia. They seem to have spoken a Coahuiltecan dialect, though little of their language is known. (Note: Historian and author, J. R. Swanton, also did not list the Pastias as a Coahuilteco-speaking group due to Hodge's oversight.) A 1707 document noted that name and meaning, but other contemporaneous records do not mention skin alterations.

== Cuisine ==
The Pastia survived by harvesting and storing the area's abundance of pecans and other nuts and seeds. Prickly pear cacti (nopal) also contributed a large part to their diet. The Pastia, as well as the other tribes of the southeastern Texas tidal plain, reportedly subsisted in the lean months on roots; raw insects, lizards, and worms; and the undigested nuts picked from deer dung.

== Missionization ==
Records from the time tell of the Pastias and other Indian tribes of the area having encampments in the vicinity of the Spanish missions of San Antonio during their early construction, a period spanning 1707 through 1737. Many were employed as laborers in the building of the San Antonio mission network. The Pastia were one of the three groups present at the 1720 foundation of Mission San José y San Miguel.

== Decline ==
The tribes of southeastern Tejas suffered a severe decline in population following repeated epidemics of diseases to which they had no immunity, starting about the time of, or shortly before, the mission network's construction. This was in large part due to the close proximity of their labor camps to the settlements of the European mission workers who carried Old World diseases (such as smallpox) which were extremely deadly to the aboriginal inhabitants of the villages surrounding the missions. Following the establishment of the Mission San Antonio de Valero (the Alamo) in 1718, many of the Native American peoples inhabiting the area were relocated from their traditional towns and moved onto the San Antonio mission lands.

The few surviving Pastia reportedly gathered only at the Mission San José. Population figures for the refugees are not available, however, as the registration records of the early mission residents have been lost to history. As late as 1789, there were settlers in the settlement who identified as Pastia.

== Historical oversight and confusion ==
The Pastias have been confused throughout history with several other tribes indigenous to the wider area. They have been mistaken for the Pasxa (Patzau) and Pachal (Pacal, Pasteal) peoples. The Patiri, an Indian tribe native to the woodlands of southeast Texas, were claimed as Pastia residents at the Mission San Ildefonso (in present-day Milam County), an area the Pastias never inhabited or visited. The Mission Concepción de Acuña's residents using Pastias as a surname are unproven members of that tribe.

Following the decline of the Pastia and their neighboring tribes, the lands that were once their homes and the southeastern Texas coastal plains were eventually inhabited by the Apache. Today, there is no extant tribe of the Pastia people.
