= Pedro de Aguirre =

Basque Spanish military man and explorer

- Born: Arantza, Navarre, Spain
- Died: Unknown
- Occupations: Military man and Explorer

Pedro de Aguirre was a Basque Spanish military man and explorer. He led the Espinosa-Olivares-Aguirre expedition in Texas.

== Biography ==
Aguirre was born in Arantza, a small town located in the autonomous community of Navarre, Spain, to Pedro de Aguirre and María Sagardia. Aguirre joined the Spanish Navy in his youth and was promoted to captain. Later, he was sent to Coahuila to work at the Presidio de San Juan Bautista del Río Grande del Norte, where he served as a commander.

In 1708 he was elected by a council to lead the expedition of Antonio de Olivares and Isidro de Espinosa to San Antonio, Texas and the Colorado River of Texas. The expeditionary team included fourteen soldiers. The purpose of the expedition was to establish a colony in San Antonio and make an agreement with the Tejas Indians, a Native American people who had been sighted on the banks of the Colorado River of Texas. This agreement would require the Tejas to monitor the territory and inform the explorers if the French were trading there as they suspected (since the French wanted to occupy Texas and trade between Latin America and foreign territories was illegal).

The group began its journey on April 5, 1709 at the San Juan Bautista mission on the Sabinas River (in present-day Mexico).

Upon arriving in San Antonio, they explored the region. In this place, they discovered the San Pedro Springs and the San Antonio de Padua river, which were named with their modern names. As they progressed on their journey, the group made contact with several indigenous peoples they did not know, particularly with the Yojuanes and their allies, the Simonos and the Tusonibi. The Amerindians insisted on taking the group to their villages, located along the Rio Brazos, and introducing them to their families. However, they declined the invitation.

On April 19, they arrived at the Colorado River, but did not find any Tejas. On April 28, after the failure of their last mission, the group left the region and took the road back to San Juan Bautista.
