= Presidio San Antonio de Béxar =

- Main and Military Plazas Historic District
- U.S. National Register of Historic Places
- U.S. Historic district
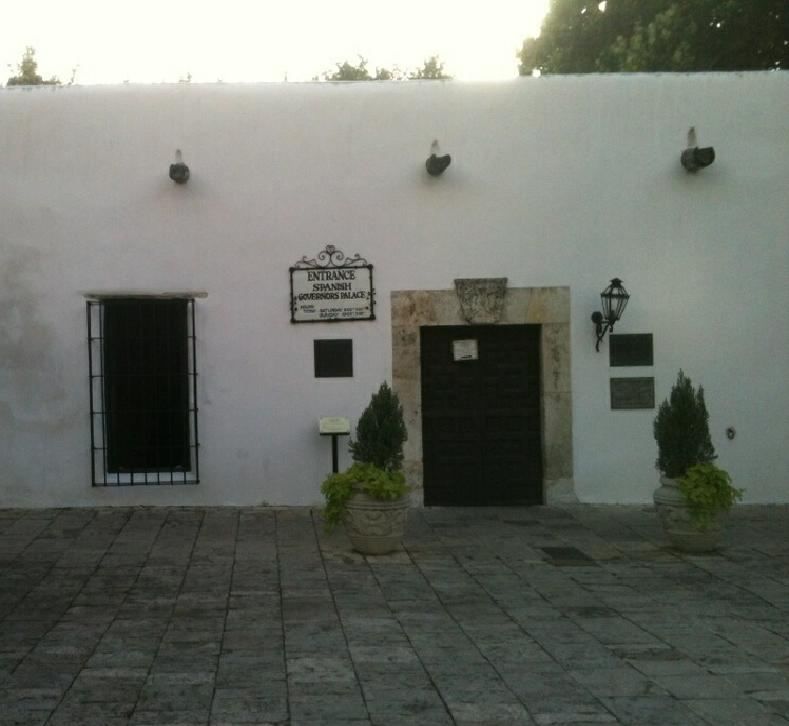
- Spanish Military Governor's Palace

- Location within Texas
- Location: San Antonio, Texas; United States
- Coordinates: 29°25′27″N 98°29′37″W
- Built: 1718
- NRHP reference No.: 79002914

Significant dates
- Added to NRHP: June 11, 1979
- Designated HD: April 15, 1970

Presidio de Béxar was a Spanish fort built near the San Antonio River, located in what is now San Antonio, Texas, in the United States. It was designed for protection of the mission San Antonio de Valero and the Villa de Béjar. The Presidio de Béxar was founded on May 5, 1718 by Spanish colonial official Martín de Alarcón and his party of thirty-five soldiers. The Villa de Béjar is known for being the first Spanish settlement of San Antonio and consisted of the families of the Presidio Soldiers and those of the prior expeditions. It also served to secure Spain's claim to the region against possible encroachment from other European powers.

== Establishment ==
From the Convent of Querétaro, several expeditions were organized to the region of Texas, an area of great strategic importance to the Spanish crown. With that goal, in 1675 an expedition formed by Fray Antonio de Olivares, Fray Francisco Hidalgo, Fray Juan Larios, and Fernando del Bosque was sent to explore and describe the country beyond the Rio Grande, to test the possibilities of new settlements in the area.

In 1709, Olivares participated in the expedition headed by Pedro de Aguirre, together with Fray Isidro de Espinosa, exploring the territory between the present-day location of the city of San Antonio and the Colorado River. The same year, he traveled to Spain to convince the authorities of the importance of maintaining the territory and establishing new missions on the bank of the San Antonio River. The authorities said "yes." He remained in Spain six years (until 1715).

In 1716, Fray Antonio de Olivares wrote to the Viceroy of New Spain, telling of their hopes and plans for the future mission, and urged him to send families of settlers to found a town. In the same letter, he stressed that it was necessary for some of these families to be skilled in the useful arts and industries, "to teach the Indians all that should be required to be useful and capable citizens."

Fray Antonio's perseverance eventually paid off, and the Viceroyalty gave formal approval for the missions in late 1716, assigning responsibility for their establishment to Martín de Alarcón, the governor of Coahuila y Tejas.

Fray Antonio de Olivares organized the construction of the new mission San Antonio de Valero, from the next Mission San Francisco Solano. He also built the first irrigation ditch in Texas (Acequia Madre de Valero), six miles long, to irrigate 400 hectares of land and to supply water to the new facilities.

The operating complex was completed with the construction of the Presidio San Antonio de Béxar, on the west side of the San Antonio River, approximately one-half mile from the mission. It was designed to protect the system of missions and civilian settlements in central Texas and to secure Spanish claims in the region against possible encroachment by other European powers. The presidio consisted of an adobe building, thatched with grass, with soldiers and their families quartered in brush huts. As settlers concentrated around the presidio complex and mission, it began to form the town of Béjar or Béxar, which became the cornerstone of Spanish Tejas or Texas. Being located in the center of several operating systems, mission Béxar did not suffer the needs and anxieties of other presidios. Despite occasional Indian attacks, the defenses of the presidio walls were never completed or were deemed necessary, as the mission was partially completed and later converted into the main unit of walled defense.

On May 5, the Presidio San Antonio de Béxar was founded on the west side of the San Antonio River, marking the origin of the present city of San Antonio, Texas. The event was chaired by Martin de Alarcón, settling around 30 families in the surrounding area. On February 14, 1719, the Marquess of San Miguel de Aguayo made a report to the king of Spain, proposing that 400 families be transported from the Canary Islands, Galicia, or Habana to populate the province of Texas. In June 1730, 25 families came to Cuba, and 10 families were sent to Veracruz. Under the leadership of Juan Leal Goraz, the group in Veracruz marched overland to the Presidio San Antonio de Béxar, arriving on March 9, 1731. The group joined the military community resident since 1718, forming the first government of the city and taking as its headquarters the Presidio of San Antonio de Béxar.

In 1726, there were 45 soldiers in the fort and 4 families living nearby; nine soldiers were spread between the missions and the total civilian population was 200 people. Soldiers' quarters and the Spanish Governor's Palace were completed in 1749 to house the military garrison's commanding officer. The location became known as the Plaza de Armas. In 1763, there were 22 soldiers in the presidio, entrusted to defend all five nearby missions. The soldiers at times were used as escorts, and to prevent cattle rustling and smuggling. In 1772, other forts in the area were closed; Presidio San Antonio de Béxar, however, was left open and became the principal defense in Texas, with a command of 80 soldiers. Béxar was made the capital of Texas and the presidio captain served as regional governor. In 1790, plans were made to renovate the fort, but were never realized.

In 1803, 100 men from the Second Flying Company of San Carlos de Parras (Álamo de Parras) were sent to reinforce the presidio, from Parras de la Fuente in southern Coahuila. Under the jurisdiction of the clergy of the Villa de San Fernando de Béxar and the Bishop of Nuevo León, they occupied the presidio Plaza de Armas (military Plaza) and the secularized mission of San Antonio de Valero.

Although stockade walls were begun in 1805 on the north side of the city, a fort was no longer believed necessary. By 1806, all the troops had moved into the former Alamo Mission, by then a fort.

In 1811, retired militia officer, Juan Bautista de las Casas, persuaded the presidio soldiers to rebel against its Spanish officers. Later, support for the Royalist officers was re-established, and the soldiers joined the army under Manuel María de Salcedo and fought against the Gutiérrez-Magee Expedition in 1813.

In 1825, Erasmo Seguín was appointed quartermaster of San Antonio, a position he held for a decade. During the Mexican and Texan wars of independence, the presidio garrison actively participated in numerous military engagements.

In 1835 Domingo de Ugartechea, the commandant of the now-former Mexican state of Coahuila y Texas, was headquartered at the presidio, during the Texas Revolution. After the siege and Battle of Béxar and the expulsion of Mexican troops from Texas in December 1835, Texian Colonel James C. Neill briefly commanded Béxar and the Alamo. The town and the Alamo fort were recaptured by the Mexican army at the Battle of the Alamo in March 1836 and the Mexican garrison was temporarily reinstated. The presidio officially ceased to exist when the Mexican Army presented their formal surrender in San Antonio on June 4, 1836, to Béxar Military Chief Juan Seguin.

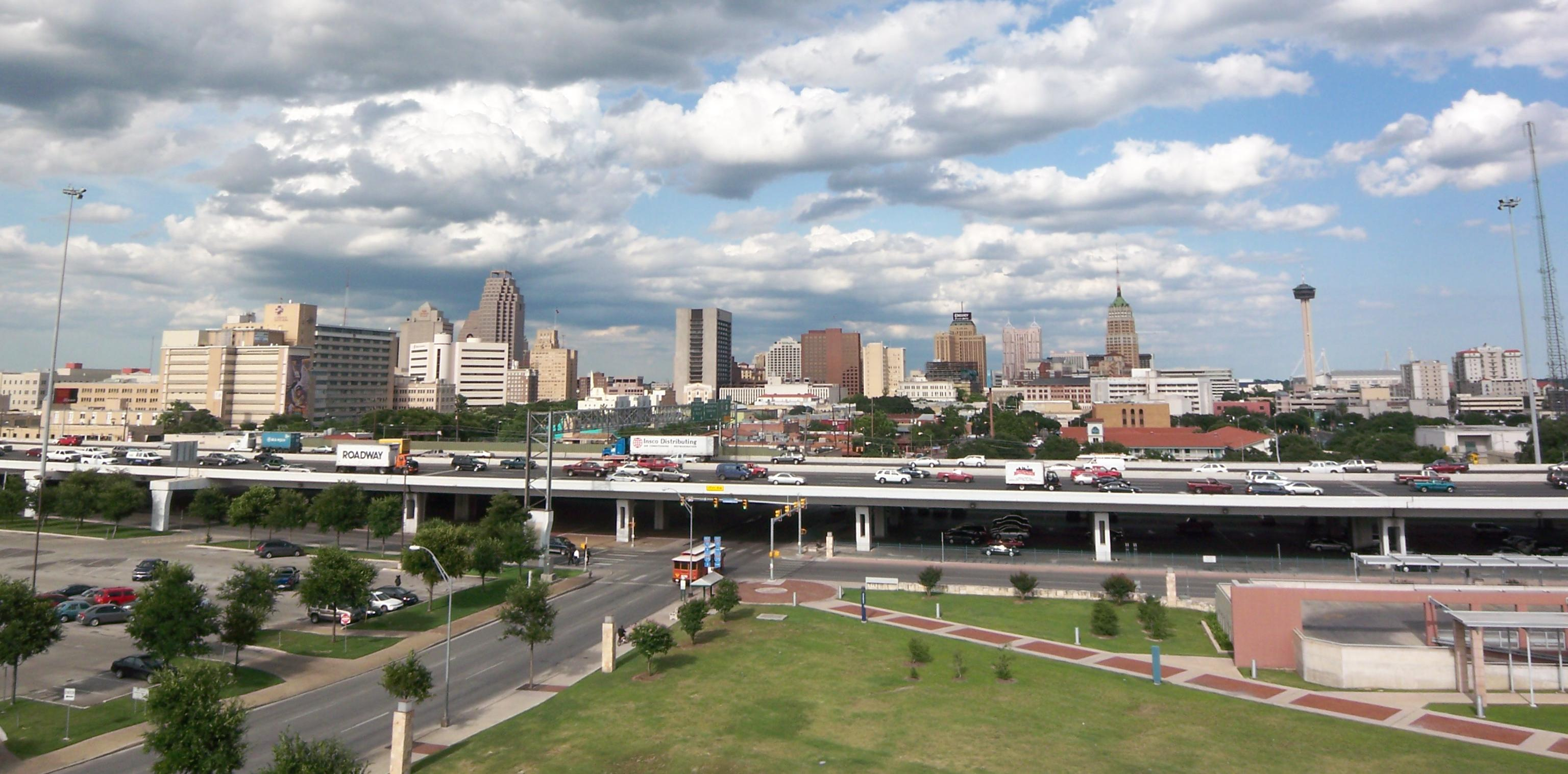
Presidio San Antonio de Béxar is located in modern-day downtown San Antonio, Texas, U.S.A.

== See also ==
- Father Antonio de Olivares
- Alamo Plaza Historic District
  - Alamo Mission in San Antonio
- Main and Military Plazas Historic District
  - Spanish Governor's Palace
- Acequia Madre de bexar
