= Simono =

The Simono were an Indigenous people who lived in what is now part of the Mexican state of Nuevo Leon and the U.S. state of Texas from at least the 16th century in the 18th century.

In the late 1580s or maybe slightly earlier the pressure of the Spanish incursion caused the Simoni to migrate north of the Rio Grande and join forces with the Yojuane as part of the greater Jumano league.

By 1709 the Simono were living in eastern Texas along the Rio Brazos in an area known as the Rancheria Grande. In that year a hunting party of Simoni as well as Yojuane and Tusonibi encountered the expedition of Isidro de Espinosa and tried unsuccessfully to get him and his associates to come to the Rancheria Grande and meet with the rest of their families. By the 1740s when most of the Yojuane moved to the San Gabriel River missions the Simoni seem to have lost their separate identity and become subsumed within the Yojuane people.
