= Francisco Hidalgo =

Spanish priest and missionary

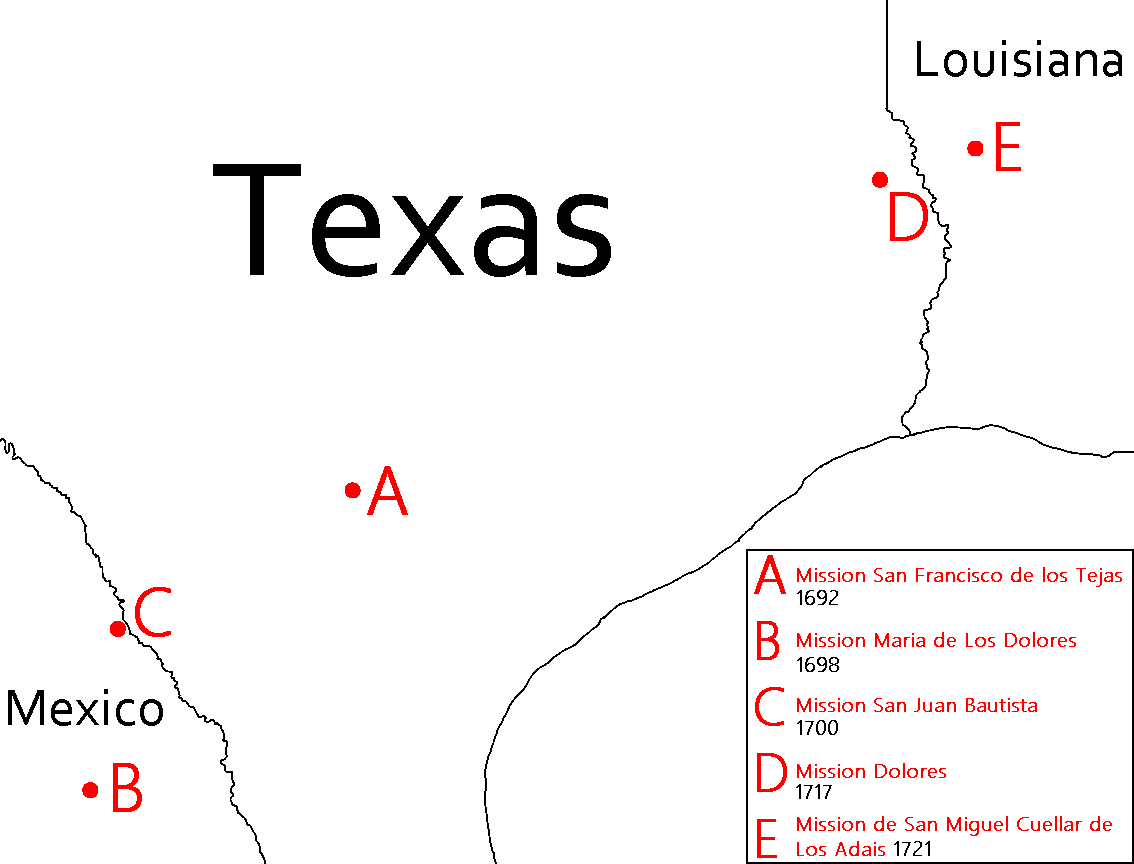
The missions founded by Francisco Hidalgo from Mexico to Louisiana

Francisco Hidalgo was a Spanish Franciscan priest who founded missions in Spanish Texas and sought to create a line of missions from Mexico to the Caddo.

== Early life ==
Francisco Hidalgo was born in Spain in 1659 and seems to have been orphaned shortly thereafter. He joined the Franciscan order in 1659, eventually becoming a priest, and left Spain for New Spain in 1683 to help found the College of Santa Cruz de Querétaro.

== Missions ==
Hidalgo joined a failed expedition with Domingo Terán de los Ríos in 1692 and remained in East Texas to help found the Mission San Francisco de los Tejas. It was here that he envisioned a chain of missions to lead all the way across Texas to the eastern edge of Hasinai Caddo territory to facilitate the settlement of the Piney Woods. Under the support of the College of Santa Cruz de Querétaro, he established the Mission Maria de Los Dolores in 1698, and the Mission San Juan Bautista in 1700.

After more than a decade of inability to complete his chain of missions, he secretly wrote a letter to Antoine de la Mothe Cadillac inviting the French to come and trade with the locals, as well as to send priests to Christianize them. By inviting a rival power to operate in Spanish territory, this request was essentially an act of treason, but done for the sake of the natives. Cadillac received the letter and sent Louis Juchereau de St. Denis for the mission. Alarmed by the arrival of St. Denis in Texas, the Spanish renewed efforts to colonize Texas, so Hidalgo was dispatched and in 1717 he established the Mission Dolores and Mission de San Miguel Cuellar de Los Adais as well as re-established the Mission San Francisco de los Tejas as Mission San Francisco de la Espada. With these missions he had completed a chain from New Spain to Caddo territory, although the outbreak of the War of the Quadruple Alliance pit Spain and France against each other in 1719, and all missions north of San Antonio were abandoned. Hidalgo retired there at the Alamo, was denied permission to preach to the Lipan Apaches, and subsequently retired to Mission San Juan Bautista, where he continued to ask for permission to preach to the Apaches until 1725.

Francisco Hidalgo was known for his preaching to natives, especially outside Querétaro and Zacatecas, and he could reportedly end long-standing family disputes through his messages.

== Death ==
Francisco Hidalgo died at the age of 67 in 1726.
