= Payaya people =

Historic Native American tribe from present-day San Antonio, Texas, US

Payaya
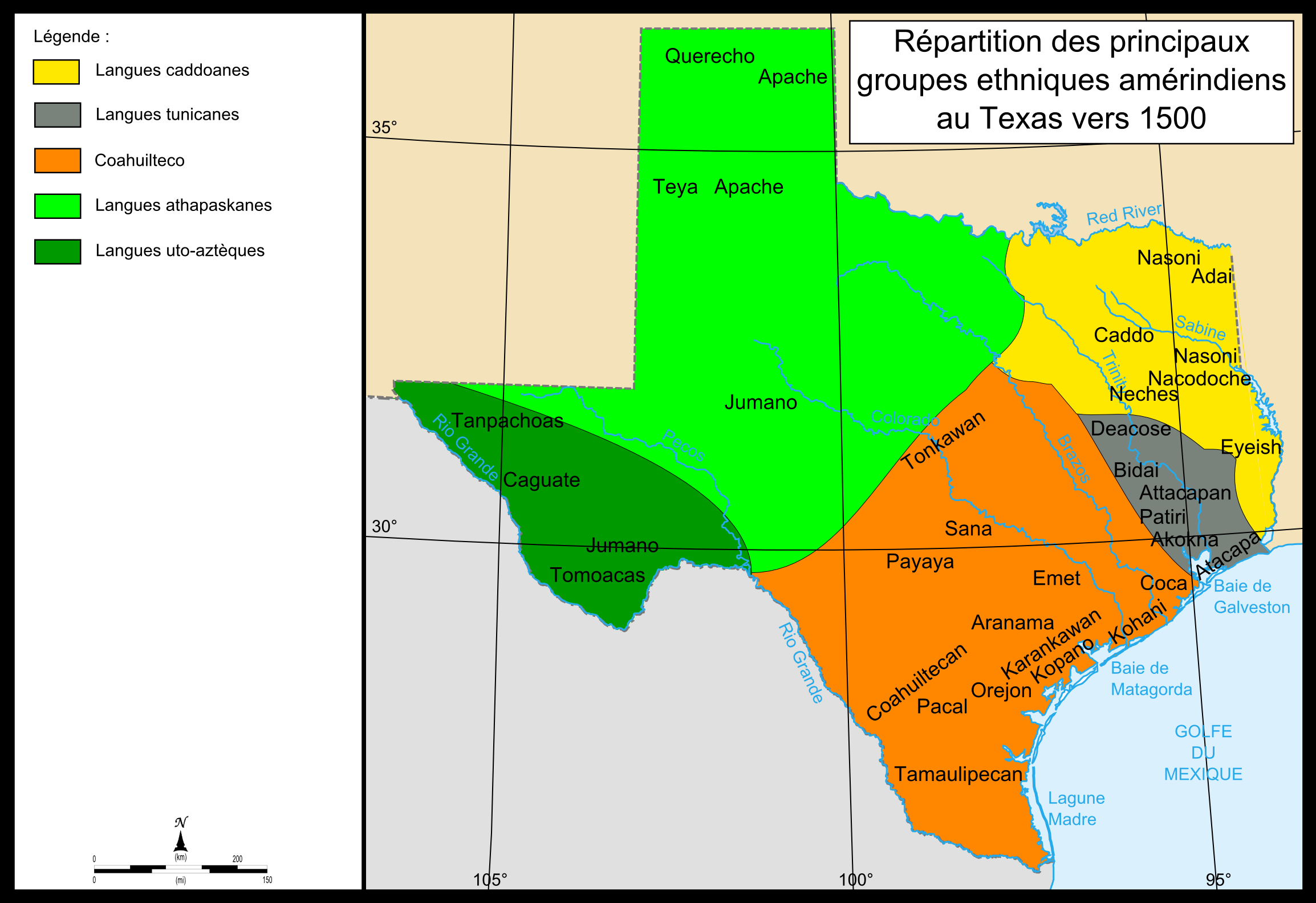
- Click map to enlarge: Payaya territories (within the orange area) in south-central Texas, ca. 1500 CE

Total population
- extinct as a tribe

Regions with significant populations
- present-day Bexar County, Texas

Languages
- a Coahuiltecan language

Religion
- Indigenous religion, Roman Catholicism

Related ethnic groups
- other Coahuiltecan peoples

The Payaya people were Indigenous people whose territory encompassed the area of present-day San Antonio, Texas. The Payaya were a Coahuiltecan band and are the earliest recorded inhabitants of San Pedro Springs Park, the geographical area that became San Antonio.

== Territory and settlement ==
The Payaya people lived near the San Antonio River, the Frio River to the west, near the Pastia tribal lands; and Milam County to the east, where they lived among the Tonkawa.

The Payaya called their village Yanaguana. It was located next to the river which the Spanish named the San Antonio. Some historians believe the band referred to the river as Yanaguana, but the Spanish Franciscan priest Damián Massanet recorded this as the name of their village.

== History ==
=== 17th century ===
The Payaya first made contact with Spanish colonists in the 17th century, when the tribe had ten different encampments.

=== 18th century ===
By the year 1706, the Spanish had converted some Payaya among the Indigenous converts baptized at Mission San Francisco Solano, 5 miles (8.0 km) from the Rio Grande in Coahuila, Mexico. Today's municipality of Guerrero is the approximate location of Mission San Francisco Solano. The Payaya were a small band of sixty families by 1709.

In 1716, the Payaya befriended Franciscan priest Antonio de Olivares. They became the mission Indians at San Antonio de Valero Mission, founded in 1718, later known as the Alamo Mission in San Antonio. The mission began assimilation of the Payaya by teaching them Spanish and trade skills. The tribe had an elected form of self-government within the mission. Infectious diseases took a high toll of the mission Payaya during the 18th century.

== Culture ==
The Payaya, like other Coahuiltecan peoples, had a hunter-gatherer society. The Spanish recorded their nut-harvesting techniques. Historians have speculated that the band's movements in the Edwards Plateau is an indication that pecans were a substantive protein source to the Payaya.

Spanish Franciscan priest Damián Massanet wrote about the Payaya on the June 13, 1691, in his journal. He described an Indigenous people who were friendly toward the Spanish, but warlike and combative within their own group. Massanet described a tribal war dance, their deerskin clothing, and the practice of stealing horses and capturing women from other tribes. He said the Payaya were adept at learning the Spanish language and enjoyed Spanish clothing.

Massanet portrayed the Payaya as having a respectful attitude towards a higher spiritual power and noted they had erected a wooden cross in their village. Massanet recounted that the day after the Spanish arrived, he and his group observed the Feast of Corpus Christi with a Mass, during which the Payaya were present.

== Language ==
Payaya
- Native to: Texas
- Region: around San Antonio
- Ethnicity: Payaya
- Era: 18th century
- Language family: unclassified (Coahuiltecan)

Language codes
- ISO 639-3: None (mis)
- Glottolog: paya1237

The Payaya language is not sufficiently attested to classify.

== See also ==
- Acequia Madre de Valero
