= Domingo Terán de los Ríos =

Governor of Spanish Texas

Governor of Sonora y Sinaloa
- In office 1681–1686

1st Governor of Texas and 3rd of Coahuila
- In office 1691–1692
- Preceded by: Diego Ramón (Coahuila) / Established office (Texas)
- Succeeded by: Gregorio de Salinas Varona

Personal details
- Born: Unknown
- Died: Unknown
- Profession: Politician

Domingo Terán de los Ríos served as the first governor of Texas from 1691 to 1692. He also governed Nueva Extremadura, which covered parts of modern day Coahuila in Mexico as well as most of Texas west of the Medina river excluding the area west of about the eastern edge of New Mexico, although most of that area was effectively not under Spanish control but that of the Comanche and other peoples.

== Previous service ==
Terán served the Spanish crown in Peru for two decades. He came to Mexico in 1681 as a deputy of the consulado of Sevilla. He was appointed governor of the province of Sonora y Sinaloa in 1686, and served in that position for approximately five years. As governor, he successfully developed a mining industry and pacified the Native Americans in that area.

== Coahuila and Tejas ==
Terán was appointed governor on January 23, 1691, by Viceroy Gaspar de la Cerda, 8th Count of Galve. He was appointed to oversee the administration of Coahuila, Texas and adjacent regions. His role as governor was to set up seven missions among the Tejas Indians; to seek and remove any foreigners that may have settled in Spanish territory; and to catalog the land, the natural resources, and the peoples of the area.

Terán and his company departed on their trek on May 16, 1691, from Monclova, crossed the Rio Grande on May 28, and had reached the Red River by December of that year. When they reached San Francisco de los Tejas, de los Ríos renamed the region Nuevo Reyno de la Montaña de Santander y Santillana.

On June 13, 1691, Terán and his company camped at a rancheria on a stream called Yanaguana . They renamed the stream "San Antonio" because it was Saint Anthony's Day. Father Damian Massanet accompanied Terán on his trip.

On his journey northward, Terán met with Gregorio de Salinas Varona at the site of the French Fort Saint Louis, which had been abandoned after colonists died from disease and a Karankawa attack. He was given new orders to explore the Tejas settlements in eastern Tejas.

When Terán was travelling southward, he met Juan Enríquez Barroto at Matagorda Bay on March 5, 1692, who relayed orders from the viceroy to explore the lower Mississippi River area. Terán followed orders, but was prevented from completing them by bad weather. He and his company returned to Veracruz on April 15. Terán's expedition failed to establish any missions among the Tejas. In his report, he defended his actions and explained the negative situation which he saw in East Texas.
