= Acequia Madre de Valero (San Antonio) =

- Acequia Madre
- U.S. Historic district – Contributing property
- Recorded Texas Historic Landmark
- HAER drawing of the acequia

- Location within Texas Location within the United States
- Coordinates: 29°25′18″N 98°29′21″W
- Built: 18th century
- Architect: Antonio de Olivares; Payaya Indians; Pastia Indians
- Part of: Alamo Plaza Historic District (ID77001425)
- RTHL No.: 78

Significant dates
- Designated CP: July 13, 1977
- Designated RTHL: 1968

Acequia Madre de Valero is an 18th-century agricultural irrigation canal built by the Spanish and located in the Bexar County city of San Antonio in the U.S. state of Texas. When Martín de Alarcón founded San Antonio for Spain by establishing San Antonio de Valero Mission in 1718, Franciscan priest Antonio de Olivares and the Payaya and Pastia peoples, dug Acequia Madre de Valero by hand. It was vital to the missions to be able to divert and control water from the San Antonio River, in order to grow crops and to supply water to the people in the area. This particular acequia was the beginning of a much wider irrigation system. Acequia Madre de Valero ran from the area currently known as Brackenridge Park southward to what is now Hemisfair and South Alamo Street. Part of it that is not viewable by the public runs beneath the Menger Hotel. The acequia was restored in 1968 and that same year was designated a Recorded Texas Historic Landmark.

Acequia Madre de Valero was the initial phase of what became a 45-mile network put in place by the Franciscan priests to provide water for the missions and their agricultural endeavors. Part of this system is adjacent to the Johann and Anna Heidgen House at 121 Starr Street, and was a contributing factor in placing the house on the National Register of Historic Places listings in Bexar County, Texas in 2004. The acequia is lined with native limestone, a facet of Spanish engineering techniques. Some later stonework in the overall network was added by German immigrants. The full system involved placement of dams, canals and sluice gates. The complete network served residents of San Antonio until late in the 19th century. The Texas Historical Commission placed the historic landmark plaque on a limestone block at the Hemisfair section of Acequia Madre de Valero.

== See also ==
- Antonio de Olivares
- Presidio San Antonio de Bexar
- National Register of Historic Places listings in Bexar County, Texas
- Recorded Texas Historic Landmarks in Bexar County
