= Sabinas River =

River in Mexico

Location
- Country: Mexico

Physical characteristics
- Mouth
  - location: Rio Salado

Ramsar Wetland
- Official name: Río Sabinas
- Designated: 2 February 2008
- Reference no.: 1769

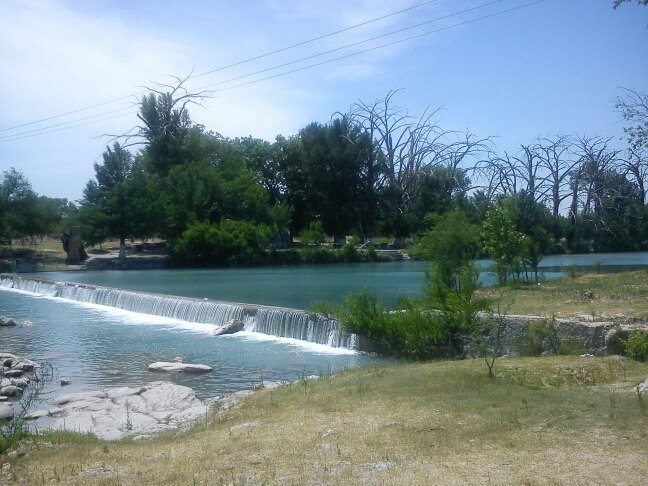
The Sabinas is a flowing river, a rarity in the Chihuahua Desert.

The Sabinas River is a river in Mexico. It is a tributary of the Rio Salado, which in turn flows into the Rio Grande.

== See also ==
- List of rivers of Mexico
- List of tributaries of the Rio Grande
