= Damián Massanet =

Spanish Franciscan priest and missionary

Damián Massanet was a Spanish Franciscan priest who co-founded the College of Santa Cruz de Querétaro, the first missionary college in New Spain.

== Biography ==
Not much is known of Massanet's early life, but he is trusted to have been born in Majorca. After traveling to New Spain, Massanet was one of the Franciscan priests who founded the College of Santa Cruz in what is present day Querétaro, Mexico, in 1683. He would later establish Mission San Bernardino de la Caldera near the Coahuila–Nuevo León bordernied Alonso De León, the governor of Coahuila, on his fourth and final expedition in search of Fort St. Louis, which had been abandoned by the French by that time. The following year, after having been named comisario for the planned East Texas missions, he assisted in the creation of Mission San Francisco de los Tejas. Later that year saw the establishment of Mission Santísimo Nombre de María, also near the Neches River. Massanet t with De León over the size of the military contingent at San Francisco de los Tejas. He would return to the region in 1691, but would continue to challenge authority; one such incident involved his unwillingness to provide horses to Domingo Terán de los Ríos, the first governor of Spanish Texas, for his return voyage to Mexico.

In October 1693, after problems such as crop failure, floods, supply shortages, and hostilities with the Nabedache, who blamed the Europeans for bringing epidemics such as smallpox to the region, Massanet and the remaining priests chose to bury San Francisco de los Tejas's cannon and bells, and burned and abandoned the site. The party would reach Monclova in February 1694, at which point Massa new sites for missions in Coahuila. He declined, noting that, without proper support, such efforts would be a failure similar to that seen at San Francisco de los Tejas.

Massanet would later return to Querétaro, and it is surmised that he spent the remainder of his life there.
