= Isidro de Espinosa =

Spanish missionary

- Born: November 26, 1679; Querétaro, New Spain
- Died: February 14, 1755 (aged 75); Querétaro, New Spain
- Occupation: Franciscan

Isidro Félix de Espinosa (1679–1755) was a Franciscan missionary from New Spain who participated in several expeditionary missions throughout the province of Tejas (modern Texas). He was the president of the missionaries from the College of Santa Cruz de Querétaro.

== Early life ==
Espinosa was born in the Spanish American area of Querétaro in modern-day Mexico. He was the son of Isidro de Espinosa and Gertrudis de Miraelrío Tovar. Espinosa had nine siblings, although three of them did not make it to adulthood. On March 18, 1696, Espinosa started studying at the College of Santa Cruz de Querétaro, and on March 19, 1697, began his career as a Franciscan. On December 17, 1703, he received holy orders and on February 26 of that year he became a priest. Sometime between the end of 1703 and early 1704 he joined the Mission San Juan Bautista.

== Missionary work ==
On April 5, 1709, an expeditionary group made up of Father Espinosa and Father Antonio de Olivares, along with Captain Pedro de Aguirre and fourteen soldiers, traveled to the area which today is San Antonio, Texas, to establish a Spanish colony, attracted by the presence of water resources in that region. Along the way, the expedition made first contact with the Pastia Indians who lived south of the San Antonio River. The expedition also encountered the Yojuane and their allies, the Simonos and Tusonibi in their travels. These groups tried to convince Espinosa and his associates to visit their villages located along the Rio Brazos, however, Espinosa could not go to their villages. The expedition moved past the San Antonio River and traveled to the Colorado River valley, where they hoped to contact the Hasinai, having heard that these native peoples inhabited the area. Espinosa and associates failed to contact any natives in the Colorado River area. The group left the area and returned to San Juan Baptista on April 28, 1709. Espinosa soon after returned to Queretaro.

Espinosa was elected to oversee the building of the missions in the province of Tejas. He returned to Tejas, and in 1716 he joined Domingo Ramón and founded several missions: San Francisco de los Tejas, Our Lady of the Immaculate Conception, and San José de los Nazonis, all of them located in east Texas. In late April 1716, another Espinosa and Ramón expedition traveled to east Texas to establish a Spanish colony in the area. Espinosa also joined the Martín de Alarcón and San Miguel de Aguayo's expeditions of 1718 and 1721, respectively.

== Chronicler of Texas ==
Espinosa was a chronicler of Spanish Texas in the first half of the 18th century. Espinosa combined his work with writing, as he served the church by day while writing at night. He earned the nickname of El Julio Cesar de la Fé en Nueva España (The Julius Caesar of Faith in New Spain). He wrote many pieces of literature, as well as a biography of the Franciscan missionary Antonio Margil de Jesus, with whom he was friends. Espinosa was the author of the Crónica de los Colegios de Propaganda Fide de la Nueva España (Chronicle of the Colleges of Propaganda Fide of New Spain), which has been considered the most outstanding work in Texas in terms of information provided about the work of the Franciscans in the North American province, being reprinted in 1964.

A letter written by Espinosa in February 1718 is now the second or third oldest document known to have used New Philippines, the official name of New Spain's most northeastern province during the 18th century.

== Later life and death ==
In late 1721, Espinosa was appointed guardian of the missions established by the Queretaro college in Tejas, but he left the region at that time and never returned. In 1733, he received the title of "president of the future hospice of San Fernando in Mexico City". Espinosa spent the final years of his life at the College of Santa Cruz in Querétaro. He died on February 14, 1755.

== Works ==
- Crónica de los Colegios de Propaganda Fide de la Nueva España
- Chronica apostolica y seraphica de todos los colegios de propaganda fide de esta Nueva Espana de misioneros Franciscanos observantes

== See also ==
- Juan Arricivita
