= San Antonio River =

Coordinates: 28°30′26″N 96°53′28″W

San Antonio River Río San Antonio
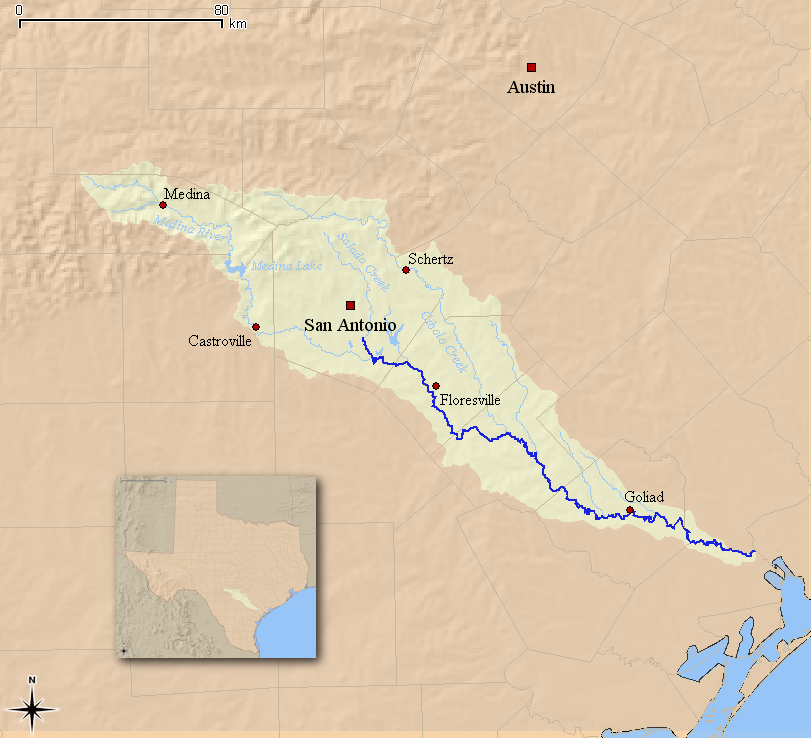
- Map of the San Antonio River and its associated watershed in South Texas.

Location
- Country: US

Physical characteristics
- Source
  - location: The San Antonio Springs near the University of the Incarnate Word in San Antonio, Texas.
  - elevation: 715 ft (218 m)
- Mouth
  - location: Flows into the Guadalupe River, 10 mi northwest of the San Antonio Bay.
- Length: 240 mi (390 km)
- Basin size: 4,180 mi^{2} (10,800 km^{2})
- Discharge
  - average: 400 cu ft/s (11 m^{3}/s)

The San Antonio River is a major waterway that originates in central Texas in a cluster of springs in midtown San Antonio, about 4 miles north of downtown, and follows a roughly southeastern path through the state. It eventually feeds into the Guadalupe River about 10 miles from San Antonio Bay on the Gulf of Mexico. The river is 240 miles long and crosses five counties: Bexar, Goliad, Karnes, Refugio, and Wilson.

== History ==
=== Naming the river ===
The first documented record of the river was from Álvar Núñez Cabeza de Vaca on his explorations of Texas in 1535. The river was later named after San Antonio de Padua by the first governor of Spanish Texas, Domingo Terán de los Ríos in 1691.

On June 13, 1691, Governor Terán and his company camped at a rancheria on a stream called Yanaguana. They renamed the stream "San Antonio" because it was Saint Anthony's Day. Father Damián Massanet accompanied Governor Terán on his trip.

=== Texas Revolution ===
During the Texas Revolution, the river was host to several major conflicts. The Battle of Concepcion occurred when the Mexican forces in Bexar and Texian militia fired upon each other in a small skirmish on the mission's grounds. The Grass Fight occurred when Texian militia mistook mules carrying grass to feed horses as mules carrying supply and gold money. The siege of Bexar was the climax of all these previous events when the Texian militia surrounded Bexar and began continuous attacks into the Mexican stronghold of Bexar until the Mexican General Martín Perfecto de Cos surrendered.

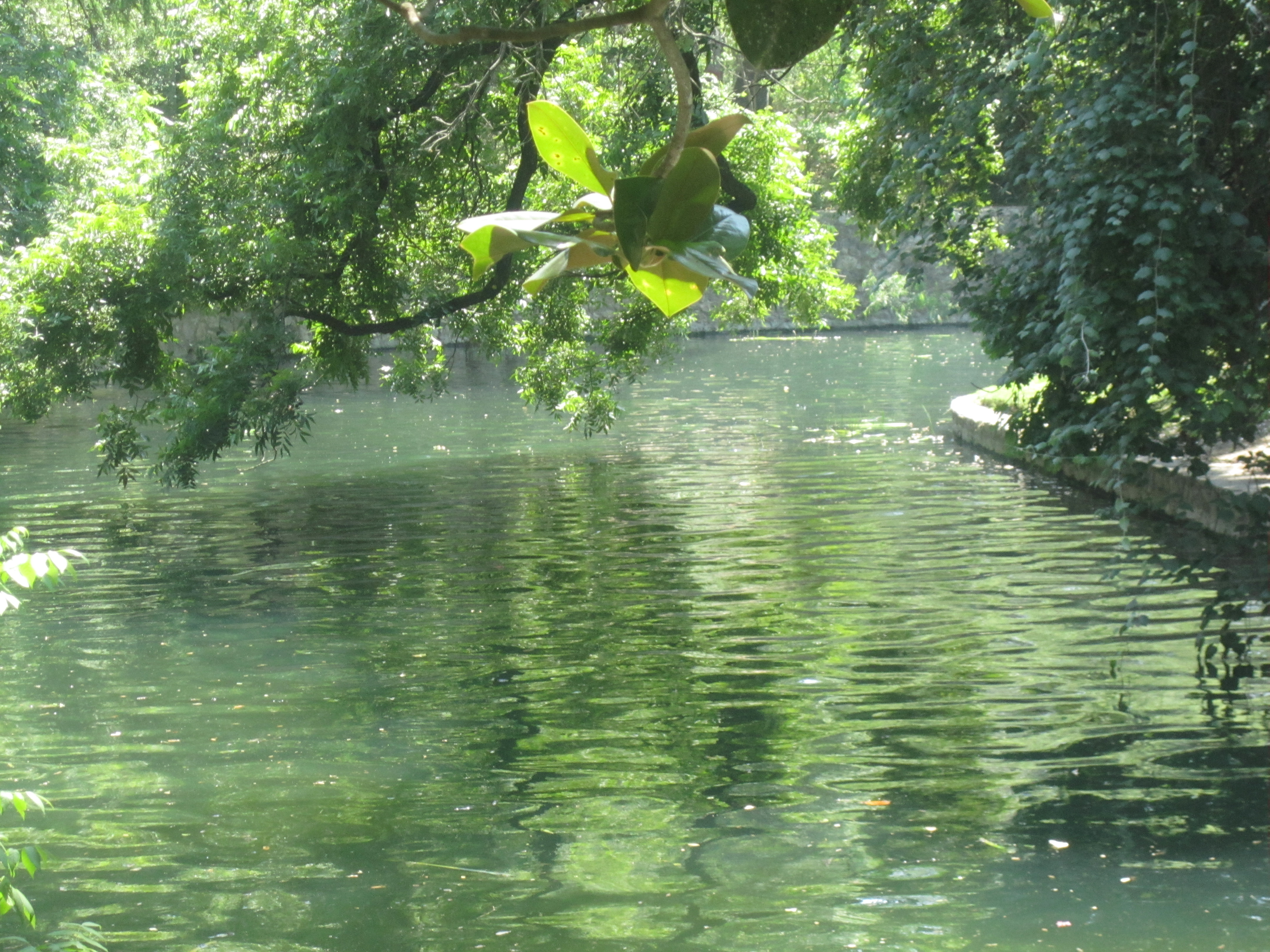
The San Antonio, near its source, at the Witte Museum in San Antonio, Texas

The Goliad Campaign occurred when 50 Texian militia captured the mission at Goliad, being used as a garrison by the Mexican forces. The Battle of the Alamo occurred when 180 Texian regulars and volunteers occupied a 3-acre garrison built around an old Spanish mission. They withheld a Mexican force of around 3,000 troops for 12 days until the garrison was overrun by a Mexican assault on dawn of the 13th day.

=== Fiesta ===
During Fiesta every April, the Texas Cavaliers River Parade runs on the San Antonio River in downtown San Antonio. It is one of Fiesta's most popular events and ticket sales revenue goes to support children's charities.

== Notable features ==
Five major 18th-century Spanish missions are lined up along the historical course of the river in San Antonio, including Mission Espada, Mission Concepcion, Mission San José, and Mission San Juan Capistrano. The most famous mission is San Antonio de Valero, better known as the Álamo, and its complementing fortress is Presidio San Antonio de Bexar. These five missions in San Antonio are now designated as a UNESCO World Heritage site. The Presidio La Bahía and its mission, Mission Nuestra Señora del Espíritu Santo de Zúñiga in Goliad, Texas, are also located along the southern portion of the river.

The waterway is also host to the San Antonio River Walk, one of San Antonio's primary tourist destinations and the centerpiece of the city, with several river improvement projects occurring so far. The Riverwalk was extended to the north in 2009, and that section of the river is now called the Museum Reach and features attractions such as the Pearl Brewery and the San Antonio Museum of Art. In 2013, the Mission Reach stretch of the Riverwalk was opened in the south, which features hiking, biking, and paddling trails.

Work was authorized to begin in 2015 by the Bexar County Commissioners Court on the restoration of the former Hot Wells hotel, spa, and bathhouse, located along the San Antonio River in the south side of the city.

== Gallery ==
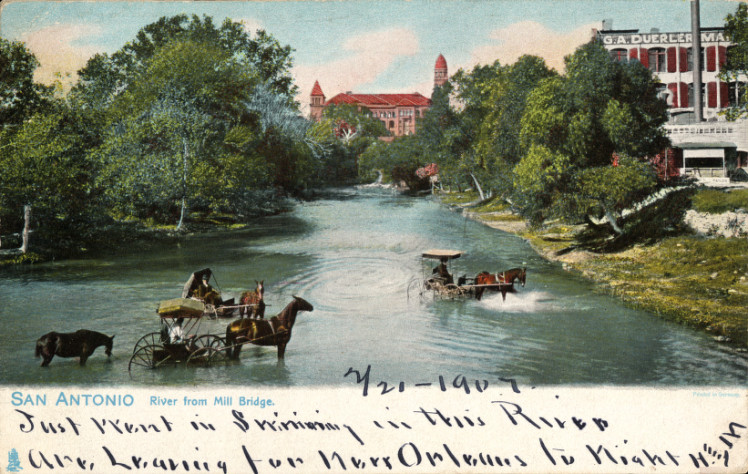
"San Antonio River from Mill Bridge" (postcard, circa 1907)

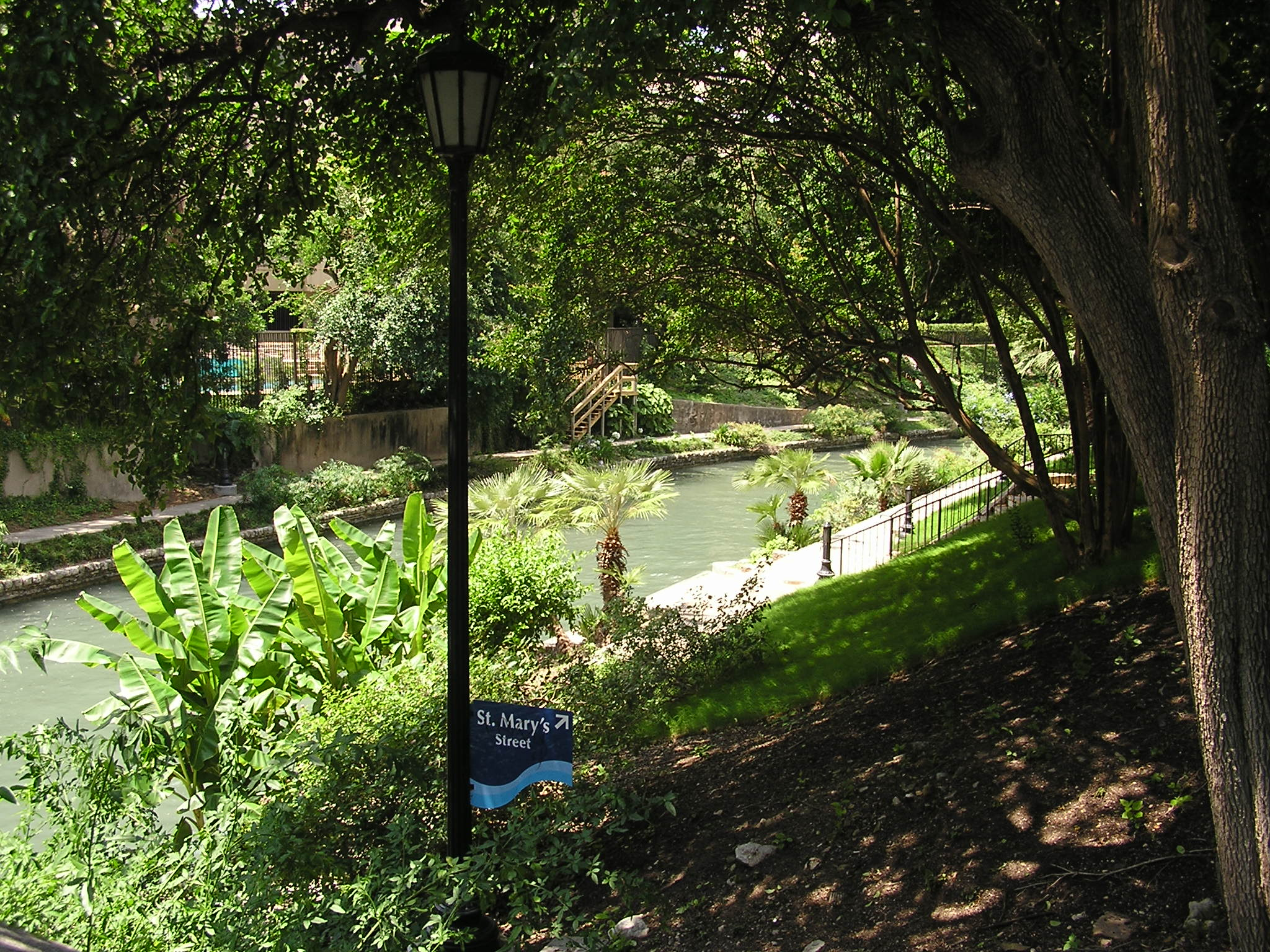
The river winds its way through downtown San Antonio.

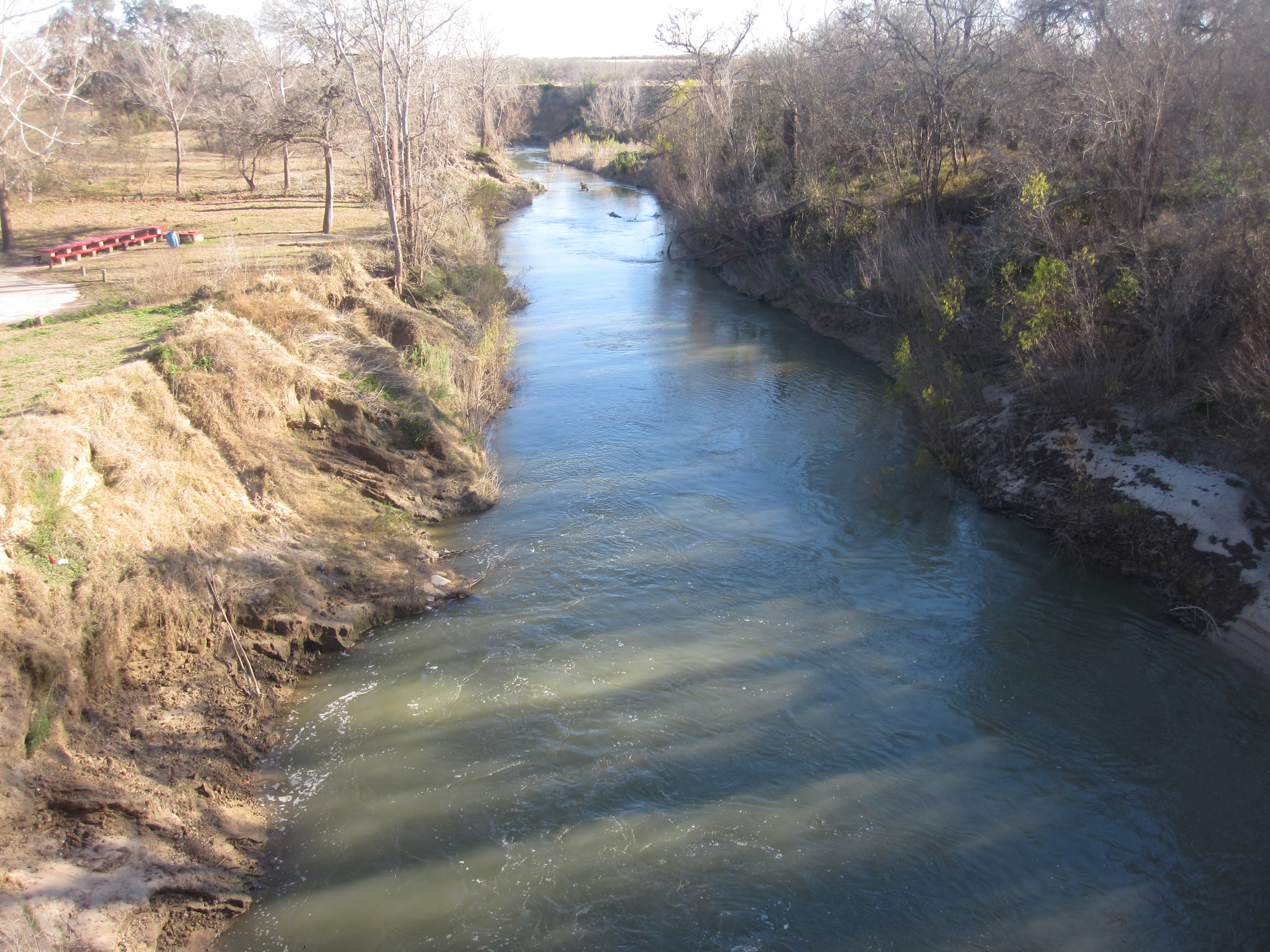
The river at Floresville River Park in Floresville in Wilson County

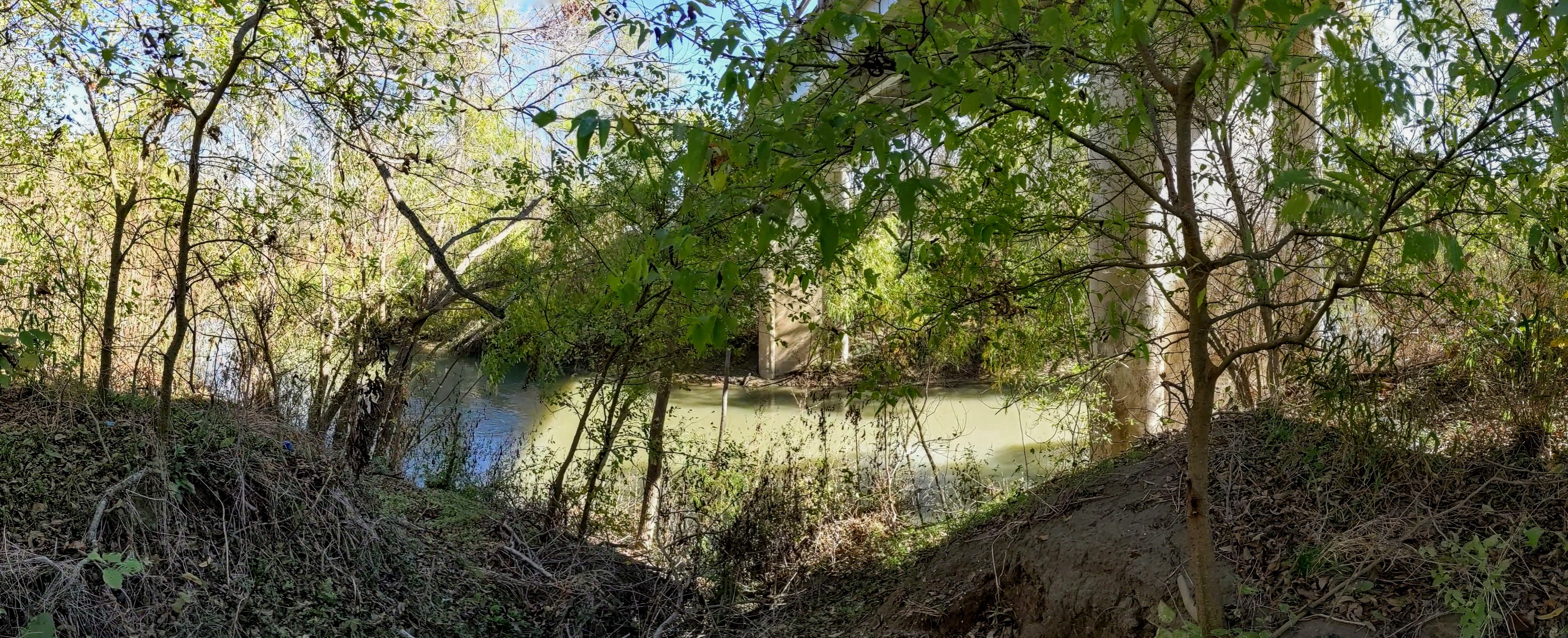
The river crossing under FM 541 between Poth and Dewees in Wilson County

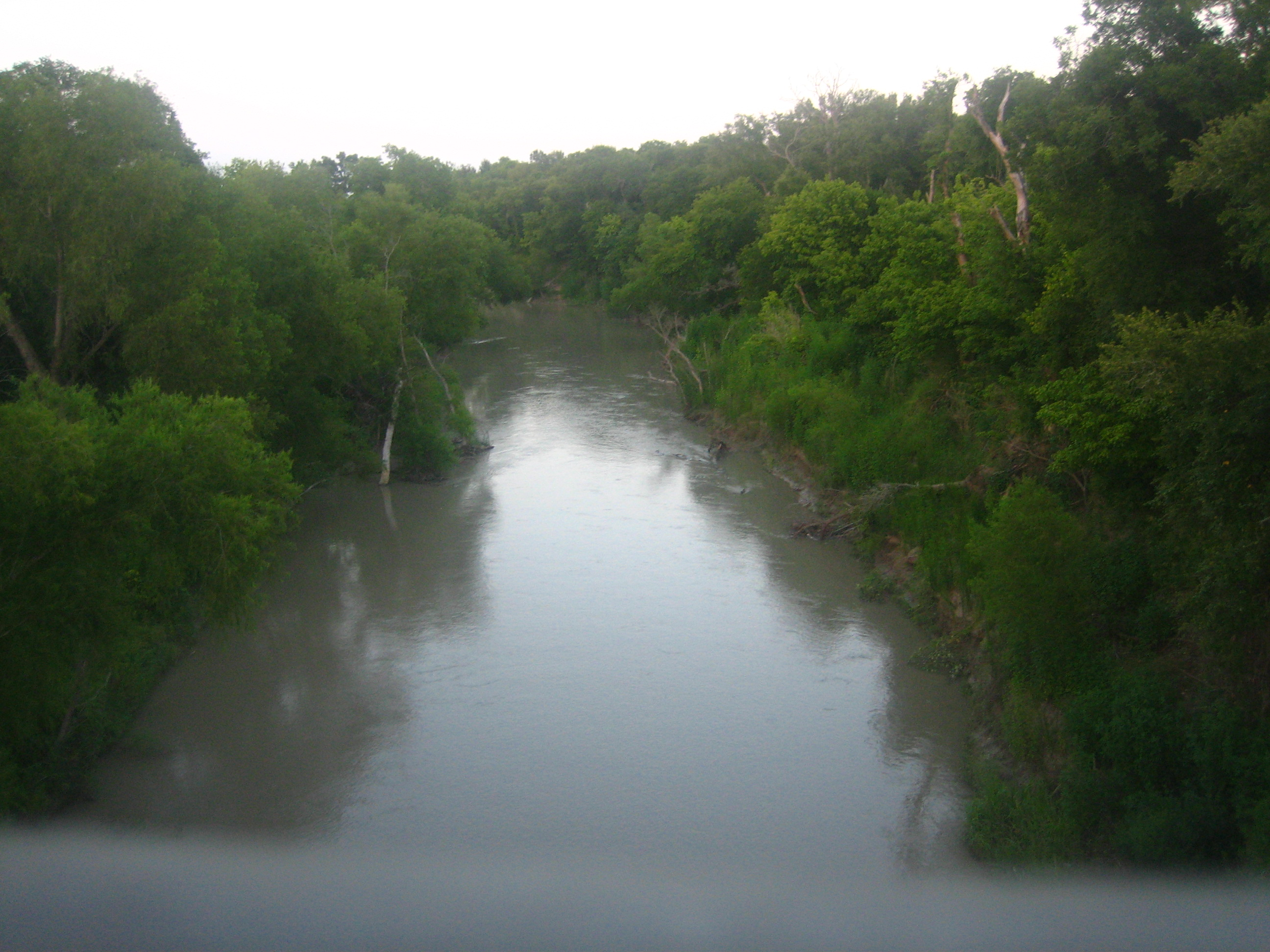
The river passes through Goliad en route to the Gulf of Mexico.

== See also ==
- San Antonio River Authority
- San Antonio Missions National Historical Park
- List of rivers of Texas
