= Martín de Alarcón =

5th Governor of Texas and 7th of Coahuila
- In office 1705–1708
- Preceded by: Matías de Aguirre
- Succeeded by: Simón Padilla y Córdova

9th Governor of Texas and 11th of Coahuila
- In office 1716–1719
- Preceded by: Juan Valdez
- Succeeded by: José de Azlor y Virto de Vera

Personal details
- Profession: Political

Martín de Alarcón was the Governor of Coahuila and Texas from 1705 until 1708, and again from 1716 until 1719. He founded San Antonio, the first Spanish civilian settlement in Texas.

== Texas ==
=== First term ===
Alarcón was first appointed governor of the Spanish provinces of Coahuila and Texas in 1705. At this time, no Spanish settlements existed in Texas. The last of the original Catholic missions in East Texas had been abandoned in 1699. The French had been establishing settlements west of the Mississippi River, and Spanish authorities feared that the French would expand into Texas. In 1707, the viceroy of New Spain ordered all provincial governors to prevent the entry of foreigners and their goods. Alarcón proposed that one of the missions along the Rio Grande, Mission San Bernardo, be relocated into Texas, along the Frio River. Nothing came of this idea, and later in 1707 Alarcón authorized an expedition into Texas, primarily to dissuade the Indians in the area from becoming friendly with the French. The Spanish troops reached only as far as the Colorado River (Texas) o río San Marco, but spent some time exploring the area around the San Antonio River; they were much impressed with the land and availability of water.

=== Second term ===
In early 1716, the Spanish government authorized a second attempt to convert the Hasinai tribe of East Texas to Christianity. Four missions and a presidio were established. Several of the soldiers assigned to the presidio brought their families with them, marking the first Spanish women recorded to enter Texas.

Later that year, Alarcón was re-appointed governor of Coahuila and Texas. He soon received word that the new missions were in dire straits, with extremely low levels of provisions. Their supplies must come from the nearest Spanish settlement, San Juan Bautista, located 400 miles (644 km) away. Alarcón envisioned creating a way station between the interior provinces and the missions of Texas. He looked first to the headwaters of the San Antonio River, an area the Spanish had mapped in 1707. It was already home to a large community of Coahuiltecans.

As Alarcon journeyed to San Juan Bautista, the launching point for an attempt to resupply the missions, he received a letter from Father Olivares, alleging that Frenchman Louis Juchereau de St. Denis had established an illegal trade network along the Rio Grande. On his arrival at San Juan Bautista, Alarcon began an investigation of the allegations. St. Denis was jailed during the four-month investigation, but Alarcon was unable to find proof that the presidial soldiers had–actively or passively–allowed illegal trade to flourish in the area. St. Denis was released from prison and fled back to Louisiana.

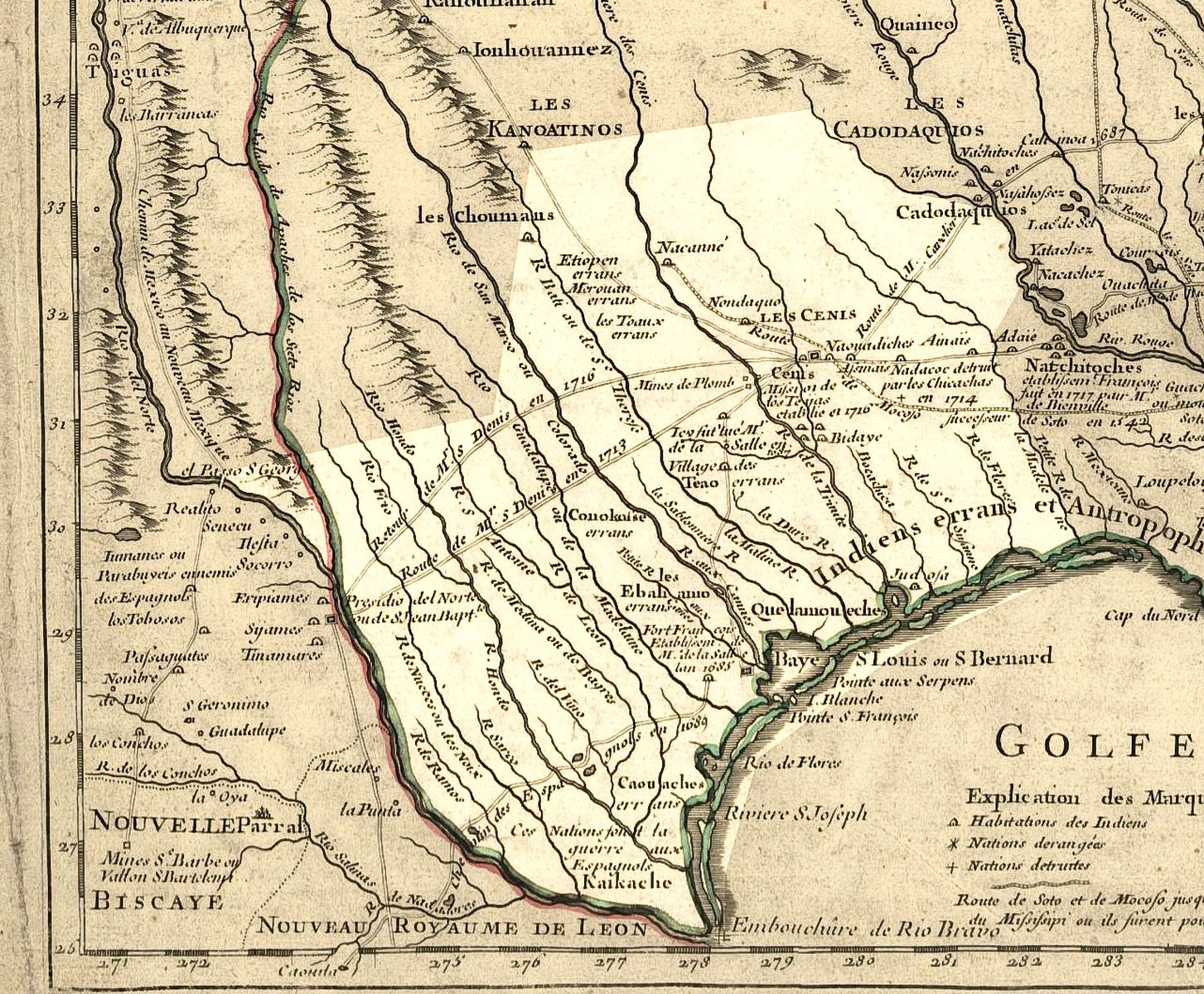
Map of Texas in 1718, during the government of Alarcon

By the time the investigation ended, winter had begun, making it impractical for Alarcón to immediately proceed into Texas. On April 9, 1718, Alarcón headed an expedition to found a community in central Texas. He was accompanied by 72 people, including 10 families. They brought with them 548 horses, 6 droves of mules, and other livestock.

=== Founding of The Alamo and of San Antonio ===
On their arrival, the group first built a temporary structure to serve as a mission. The mission's founding document is dated May 1, 1718. Signed by Alarcón as "General of the Provinces of the Kingdom of the New Philippines," it creates a new mission of San Antonio de Valero, to replace the old mission of St Joseph due to lack of water at the former site, and the new foundation is in the name of the Viceroy of New Spain, the Marquess of Valero. The mission would much later become a garrison and gain fame as The Alamo. One mile (two km) north of the mission, Alarcón built a presidio, Presidio San Antonio de Bexar. Near the presidio, Alarcón chartered a new municipality, called Bejar (now known as San Antonio). Given a status higher than a village (pueblo) but lower than a city (ciudad), San Antonio became the only villa in Texas, and the colonists who settled there relied on farming and ranching to survive.

=== Further activities ===
With the new settlement established, Alarcón continued on to re-provision and inspect the East Texas missions. Besides replenishing mission supplies, Alarcón was tasked with resettling the Indians in villages near the missions, and wished to investigate whether the Spanish in East Texas were illegally trading with the French at nearby Natchitoches.

The missionaries were becoming increasingly desperate as they waited for Alarcón to arrive. They appointed two members, representing both the missionary schools of Querétaro and Zacatecas, to carry a personal appeal to Spanish authorities in Mexico City. Their missive not only detailed the deprivations they had endured and the perceived slowness of Alarcón's response, but also mentioned their fear that France would soon extend their settlements into Texas.

While visiting the existing missions, Alarcón ordered that a new mission be established for the Nassoni people. Before his orders could be enacted, he received a letter from a French explorer, Bernard de la Harpe. La Harpe had just established a trading post within Nassoni territory (now part of Oklahoma). In a series of letters, Alarcón and la Harpe set out their positions for the boundaries between the territory of the two nations. Alarcón maintained that the area la Harpe had settled was in fact part of Spanish New Mexico, while la Harpe responded that all of Texas should belong to the French. Although la Harpe challenged Alarcón to remove the French trading post, Alarcon made no attempt to do so.

In late May 1719, Alarcón and his men began their return trip to the Mexican interior. Between the Brazos River and the Colorado River Alarcón encountered the Rancheria Grande which was the home to Yojuane, Ervipiame, Jumano, Mayeye and several other allied Native American groups. While traveling through the Rancheria Grande Alarcón attempted to set up easy trading with the people of the Rancheria by designating El Cuilón, who he called Juan Rodriguez, a prominent Ervipiame, as the chief of the Rancheria and giving him the baton to designate him as a commander.

While Alarcón and associates were en route, a group of French soldiers took control of the mission of San Miguel de los Adeas from its sole defender, The French soldiers explained that 100 additional soldiers were coming, and the Spanish colonists, missionaries, and remaining soldiers abandoned the area and fled to San Antonio. The missionaries sent a scathing letter to the viceroy, blaming Alarcón for their difficulties and the French usurpation of their post. On December 19, 1719, Alarcón was removed from office.

== See also ==
- Acequia Madre de Valero
