= Antonio Margil =

Spanish missionary (1657–1726)

Venerable Antonio de Jesus OFM
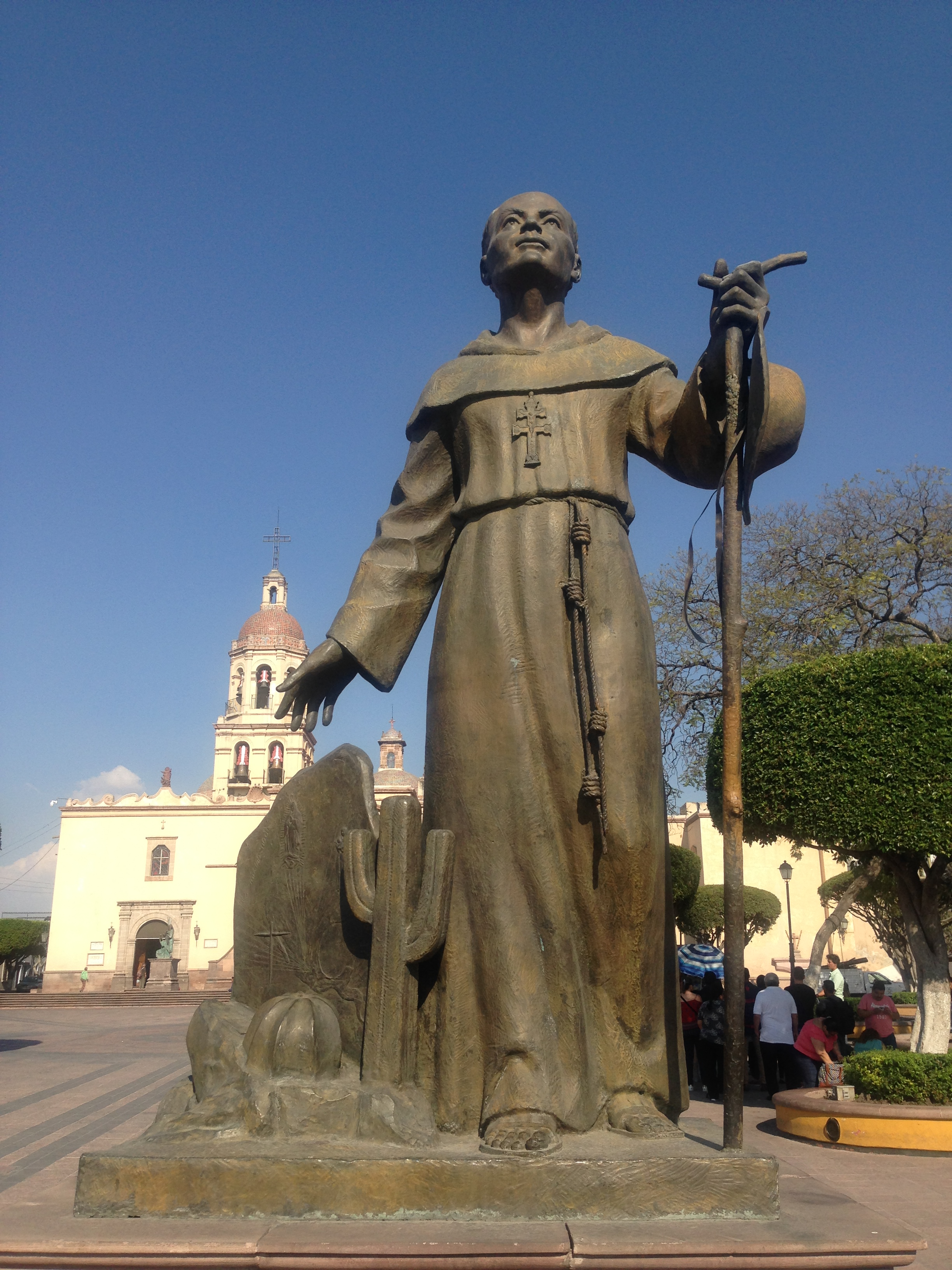
- Antonio Margil's statue in Queretaro, Mexico

Priest and Missionary
- Born: Antonio Margil Ros; 18 August 1657; Valencia, Spain
- Died: 6 August 1726 (aged 68); Mexico City, Mexico
- Venerated in: Roman Catholic Church
- Feast: August 8

Antonio Margil, OFM (18 August 1657 – 6 August 1726) was a Spanish Franciscan missionary in North and Central America. Based at the College of Santa Cruz in Santiago de Querétaro, after 1715, he worked largely in Texas and Louisiana. Father Margil was declared "Venerable" in 1836.

== Life ==
Antonio Margil was born in Valencia, Spain, on August 18, 1657. Margil entered the Franciscan Order in his native city on 22 April 1673. After his ordination to the priesthood, he volunteered for the Native American missions and arrived at Vera Cruz on 6 June 1683. He was stationed at the missionary College of Santa Cruz de Querétaro, but was generally engaged in reaching missions in Yucatan, Costa Rica, Nicaragua, and especially in Guatemala.

He always walked barefooted, without sandals, fasted every day in the year, never used meat or fish, and applied the discipline and other instruments of penance to himself. He slept very little but passed in prayer the greater part of the night, as well as the time allotted for the siesta. On 25 June 1706, Margil was appointed the first guardian of the College of Guadalupe de Zacatecas.

=== East Texas ===
In 1716 he accompanied Domingo Ramón's expedition to East Texas. The expedition began from San Juan Bautista (present-day Guerrero, Coahuila) on April 12, 1716, and was made up of seventy-five members (among them twelve friars, including Isidro de Espinosa, president of the missionaries from the College of Santa Cruz de Querétaro. and more than twenty civilians). Margil founded the mission of Nuestra Señora de Guadalupe to serve the Nacogdoche. In a 1716 letter to the viceroy of New Spain, Margil was the first to refer to these territories as the province of New Philippines.

Margil returned with Ramon in 1717 and founded Nuestra Señora de los Dolores among the Eyeish.

=== Louisiana ===
From the Eyeish, Margil heard of the Adai people, and in March, 1717, located them near Spanish Lake. He founded the mission of San Miguel de Linares, and built there probably the first church in Louisiana. This was just 20 miles (32 km) west of the French fort at Natchitoches, Louisiana.

Leaving Father Gusman in charge, Margil journeyed on foot to Natchitoches to minister to the French Catholics there, and then went back to Texas. He remained near the present city of San Antonio, Texas for more than a year. There he established Mission San José (Texas) to serve the Coahuiltecan.

In 1718, during the brief war with Spain, the French Commandant at Natchitoches, invaded the Adai mission, plundered it, and carried away the church vestments. Margil heard of it, and in 1721 came back, found the Adai who had taken refuge in the forests for fear of the French, and rebuilt their church, which he dedicated to Our Lady of the Pillar, the patroness of the expedition. For many years afterwards the Adai mission was attended from San Antonio by the Franciscans, who attended also the missions of Nacogdoches and St. Augustin, Texas.

In 1722 he was elected guardian of his college; at the close of his office term, he resumed missionary work in Mexico. He died in Mexico City at the Convento Grande de San Francisco.

== Veneration ==
Margil's cause was formally opened on July 19, 1769, and he was given the title Servant of God. His spiritual writings were approved by theologians on May 4, 1796. In 1836 Pope Gregory XVI declared Father Antonio Margil's virtues heroic, and he is now titled Venerable.

== See also ==
- Spanish missions in Texas
