= Deadose =

Historic Native American tribe of eastern Texas

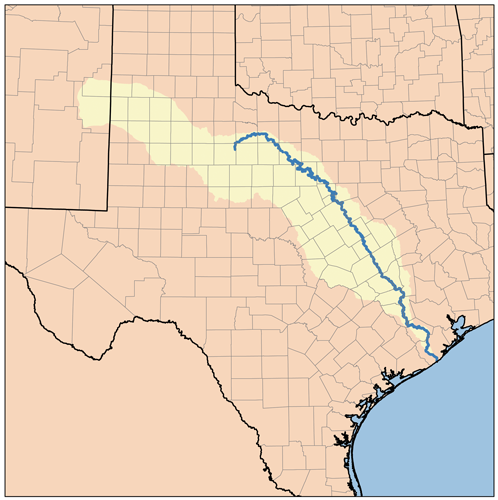
Brazos River and watershed

The Deadose were a Native American tribe in present-day Texas closely associated with the Jumano, Yojuane, Bidai and other groups living in the Rancheria Grande of the Brazos River in eastern Texas in the early 18th century.

Like other groups in the Rancheria Grande, the Deadose moved to the San Gabriel River missions in the 1740s. The Deadose were along with the Yojuane, Mayeye and Bidai those who requested the Franciscan missionaries to come and set up missions for them. However many of the Deadose as well as the Bidai and Akokisa only went to the vicinity of the missions to trade with the soldiers. They also had set up trade networks that extended to the French in Louisiana. In 1750 the Deadose and their Bidai and Akokisa associates at Mission San Ildefonso left in an alliance with Ais, Hasinai, Kadohadachos, Nabedaches, Yojuanes, Tawakonis, Yatasis, Kichais, Naconis and Tonkawas to attack the Apache. The Deadose did not come back to the mission until 1752.

At the mission, the Deadose intermarried heavily with the Akokisa and Bidai.
