= Nacogdoche =

Native American tribe

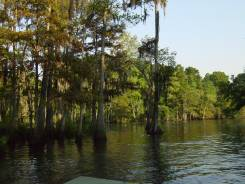
- Sabine River, Texas

Total population
- Assimilated into Caddo Nation

Regions with significant populations
- United States ( Oklahoma, formerly Texas)

Languages
- Hasinai, English

Religion
- Traditional tribal religion

Related ethnic groups
- Other Hasinai tribes: Hainai, Nabedache, Nabiti, Nacono, Nadaco, Nasoni, Nechaui, Neche

The Nacogdoche (Caddo: Nakúʔkidáawtsiʔ) are a Native American tribe from eastern Texas.

== History ==
The Nacogdoche were part of the Hasinai branch of the Caddo Confederacy and closely allied with the Lower Nasoni. They historically lived between the Angelina and the Sabine Rivers in Texas. The Gentleman of Elvas, a member of Hernando de Soto's 1541 expedition, wrote about the tribe, as did Francisco de Jesus Maria in 1691.

In 1716, Franciscan friars accompanying Spanish explorer Domingo Ramón founded the Nuestra Señora de Guadalupe de los Nacogdoches Mission to serve the Nacogdoche as well as neighboring tribes. In 1750, a Nacogdoche chief, Chacaiauchia, threatened to kill the presiding father at the mission, Father Calahorray Sanz, and demanded that all other Spaniards leave Nacogdoches territory. This threat was not fulfilled. The mission remained until in 1773, with brief dormant periods due to fear of French attack.

The governor of Texas visited the Nacogdoche in 1752. Their primary village, Nevantin, was located near present day Nacogdoches, Texas, named for the tribe. Four mounds surrounded the site of Nevantin, until relatively recently.

While Spanish colonizers claimed Nacogdoche land, the tribe traded freely with the French. French traders provided firearms, ammunition, metal-bladed knives, cloth, vermilion dye, and other sundries in exchange for horses, prepared animal hides, bear's fat, beans, corn, and Apache slaves.

By 1800, European diseases and warfare had greatly reduced the population of the tribe. The survivors joined other Hasinai tribes.

Ultimately, they were forced to relocate to the Wichita Reservation in Indian Territory in the 19th century. Today they are enrolled in the Caddo Nation of Oklahoma.

== Synonymy ==
The tribe is also known as the Nazadachotzi, Nacadocheeto, Nacodissy, Nacodochito, Nagodoche, Nasahossoz, Naugdoche, Nocodosh, and Neticatzi.

== See also ==
- Natchitoches people
