= Mission Tejas State Park =

State park in Texas, United States

Tejas Mission
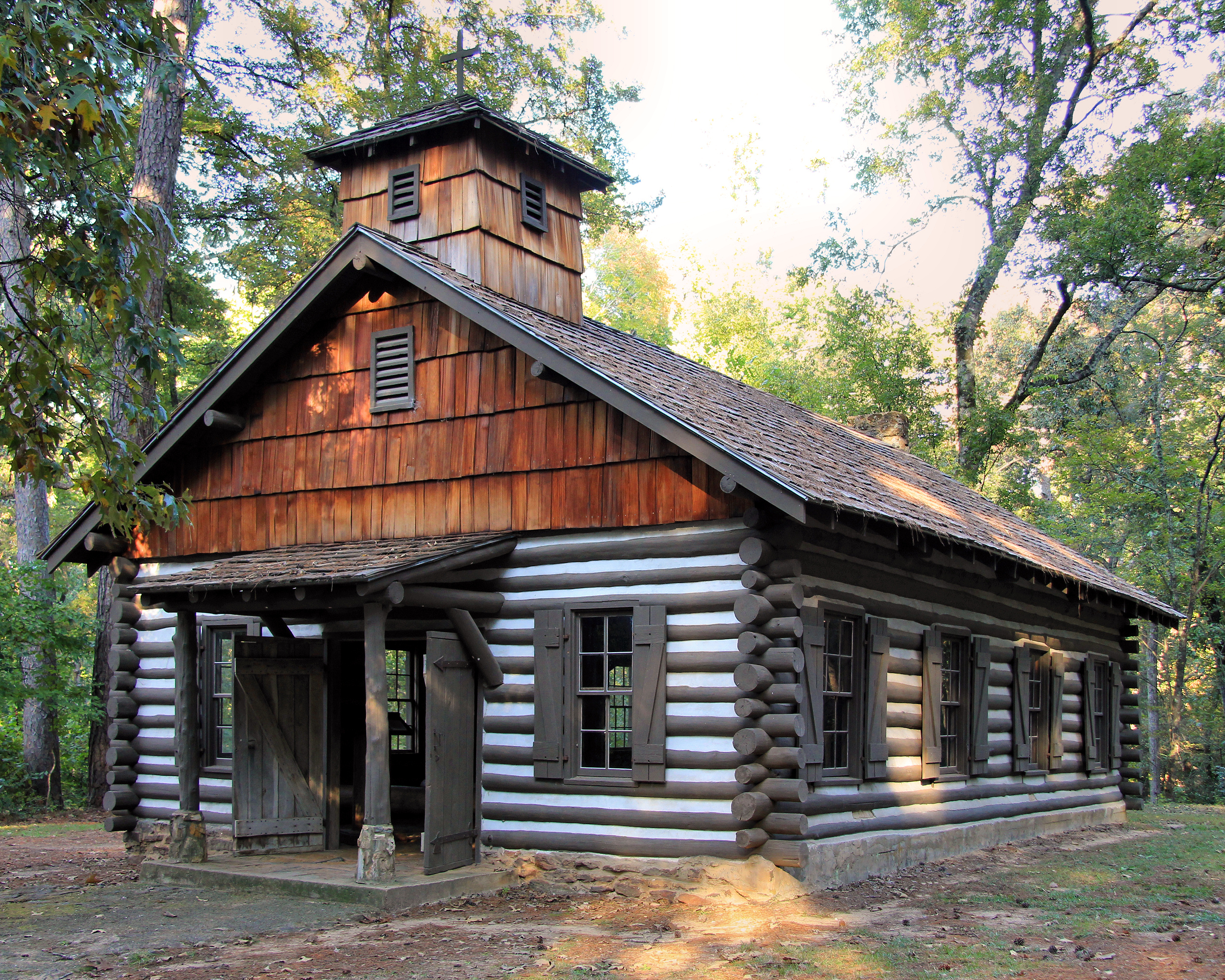
- The CCC built representation of Mission Tejas.

- Location within Texas Location within the United States
- Location: Houston County, Texas
- Nearest city: Crockett
- Coordinates: 31°32′54.3624″N 95°14′25.2852″W
- Area: 660 acres (270 ha)
- Established: 1957
- Visitors: 11,220 (in 2025)
- Governing body: Texas Parks and Wildlife Department
- Website: Official site

Mission Tejas State Park is a 660-acre (270 ha) state park located along Texas State Highway 21 in Houston County, Texas, United States originally constructed in 1935 and transferred to the State Parks Board (now the Texas Parks and Wildlife Department) in 1957. The park contains a commemorative representation of the first of many Spanish missions in Texas and one of the oldest surviving structures in Houston County. The park also contains a segment of the El Camino Real de los Tejas.

== History ==
=== Pre-European History ===
The area which now makes up the park is part of the historic settlement range of the Nabedache (or Tejas) tribe, the western branch of the Hasinai Confederacy of the Caddo Nation. The park lies just six miles from Caddo Mounds State Historic Site. The natives lived in villages stretched along San Pedro Creek and the Neches River. The park contains several known Caddo sites, but their location is not available to the public so that they may remain undisturbed.

=== Spanish Mission ===
Mission San Francisco de los Tejas was established May 23, 1690 by Captain Alonzo de Leon and Father Massanet of the Franciscan Order. The Spanish spent three days building a church and small living quarters among the Tejas villages along San Pedro Creek. Another mission, Mission Santissimo Nombre de Maria, was established along the Neches River the same year.

Mission San Francisco de los Tejas was abandoned on October 25, 1693. The actions of Spanish soldiers increased tensions among the Tejas. Crops also failed for two successive seasons. An epidemic then swept through the Tejas and killed many natives and one Spanish missionary. These events led to increased hostility and superstition among the Tejas. Fearing for their safety, the Spanish decided to leave the area. They buried the mission's bells and heavy items, set the mission on fire, and fled for San Antonio. The missions in this area were not reestablished for several years. The exact location of San Francisco de los Tejas is still undetermined, but many have searched for it. Due to the fire, time, and natural deterioration, it is difficult to determine the exact location. However, the park contains a commemorative example of the mission.

=== Anglo Settlement ===
In the 1820s, Anglo Settlement of the area began in earnest. Within the park this is represented by the Rice Family Log Home. The Rice family came to Texas from Tennessee in 1828 with a land grant from the Spanish Government, honored by the Mexican government. Originally constructed in 1828, the home was added onto twice. The final addition was completed by 1838. This home was built from local lumber and constructed by hand. The home contains original wallpaper and paint from the 1890s and is still approximately 80% original. The home was lived in until approximately 1918 when it was turned into a storage building and began to deteriorate. It was donated to the State of Texas, moved to the park in 1973 and refurbished. The log home is a popular attraction for school groups and visitors interested in early Texas history. It is perhaps the oldest surviving structure in Houston County.

=== El Camino Real de Los Tejas ===
The park contains an original segment of the El Camino Real de los Tejas. This historic route ran from Natchitoches, Louisiana to San Antonio. It was the predominant overland route across Texas for several centuries. The Rice Family Log Home within the park served as an inn along this route for travelers. Visitors to the park can still see the swales created by wagons and carts.

=== Park history ===
Following the discovery of some Spanish artifacts including a cannon barrel in the area and an increased interest in finding the original location of Mission San Francisco de los Tejas, the local community sought to preserve this history. Believing this tract of land to have been the site of the original mission, the land was purchased with contributions from the local community and gifted to the State of Texas. The Texas Forest Service developed the park for the Texas Centennial celebration in 1936. with labor provided by the Civilian Conservation Corps. The park remained within the Texas Forest Service until 1957 when it was transferred to State Parks Board and renamed Mission Tejas State Park.

=== Civilian Conservation Corps ===
Company 888 of the Civilian Conservation Corps (CCC) built the park from 1934 to 1935. Their camp was located on a tract one mile from the park's current location. The CCC built the commemorative example of Mission San Francisco de los Tejas. They constructed a dam and spillway, creating a small pond. They also constructed a fire lookout tower, campsites, picnic sites, trails, Park Road 44, fire pits and drinking fountains. Utilizing a natural spring and the slope of the land, the builders bricked up the spring, and may have created another rock feature downhill. Legend has it that the CCC used the feature for bathing but the proximity of their camp to the site makes this unlikely.

== Nature ==
=== Animals ===
The park contains abundant wildlife such as white-tailed deer, eastern gray squirrel, eastern cottontail, common raccoon, Mexican long-nosed armadillo and gray fox. Many species of bird are present including northern cardinal, pileated woodpecker, painted bunting and blue jay. Hikers should be cautious of venomous snakes in the park with the eastern copperhead and Texas coralsnake most often observed. The pond is stocked with channel catfish, largemouth bass and rainbow trout.

=== Plants ===
The park is located on the northern end of Davy Crockett National Forest within the Piney Woods of East Texas. The dominant tree species within the park is loblolly pine. Following massive clear cutting during the early 20th century, the CCC replanted much of the area, including the trees within the park. There are not many trees in the park more than eighty years old, save the Sentry Pine, one of the tallest trees in the park, which is over a century old. Other plants include white oak, American sweetgum, flowering dogwood, and American beautyberry.

== Activities ==
The park has several different types of sites for camping, from water only tent sites to full hook up recreational vehicle campsites. In total there are 15 developed sites, and 2 primitive sites. 8.5 miles of trails for hiking are available ranging from easily accessible to steep and narrow. There is a small pond for fishing. Park staff present educational and interpretive programs each week and also teach outdoor activities and skills. Each April, the park holds a Folk Festival including historical reenactment and demonstrations of American pioneer skills and activities. Other popular activities include hiking, nature study, and geocaching.

== See also ==
- List of Texas state parks
