= Nechaui =

Native American historic tribe

The Nechaui were a Native American tribe from eastern Texas. Their name is thought to be derived from Nachawi, the Caddo language word for Osage orange.

== History ==
The Nechaui were part of the Hasinai branch of the Caddo Confederacy. During the late 17th and early 18th centuries, their principal village was located on the Neches River, in present-day Cherokee County, Texas.

In the late 17th century, Spanish explorer, Francisco Casañas de Jesús María encountered the tribe and wrote, "Toward the north, where the above-mentioned Necha tribe ends, is that called the Nacachau." The Nechaui settled near the Nacono and Neche tribes. In 1716, another Spanish explorer, Domingo Ramón wrote that Franciscan friars established a mission to convert the Nechaui and neighboring Hasinai tribes.

Ultimately, they assimilated into other Hasinai tribes in the 18th century, and are enrolled in the Caddo Nation of Oklahoma today.

== Synonymy ==
The tribe is also known as the Nechavi.
