= Calvillo (surname) =

Calvillo is a surname. Notable people with the surname include:

- Anthony Calvillo (born 1972), American coach and former player of Canadian football
- Cynthia Calvillo (born 1987), American mixed martial artist
- Eric Calvillo (born 1998), American born soccer player
- María del Carmen Calvillo (1765–1856), rancher in Spanish Texas
- Nerea Calvillo (born 1973), Spanish architect and researcher

== See also ==
- Calvillo, a city in Aguascalientes, Mexico
