= College of Santa Cruz =

College of Santa Cruz may refer to:

- Colegio de Santa Cruz de Tlatelolco
- College of Santa Cruz de Querétaro
