= Mission San Francisco de la Espada =

Mission San Francisco de la Espada: A mission

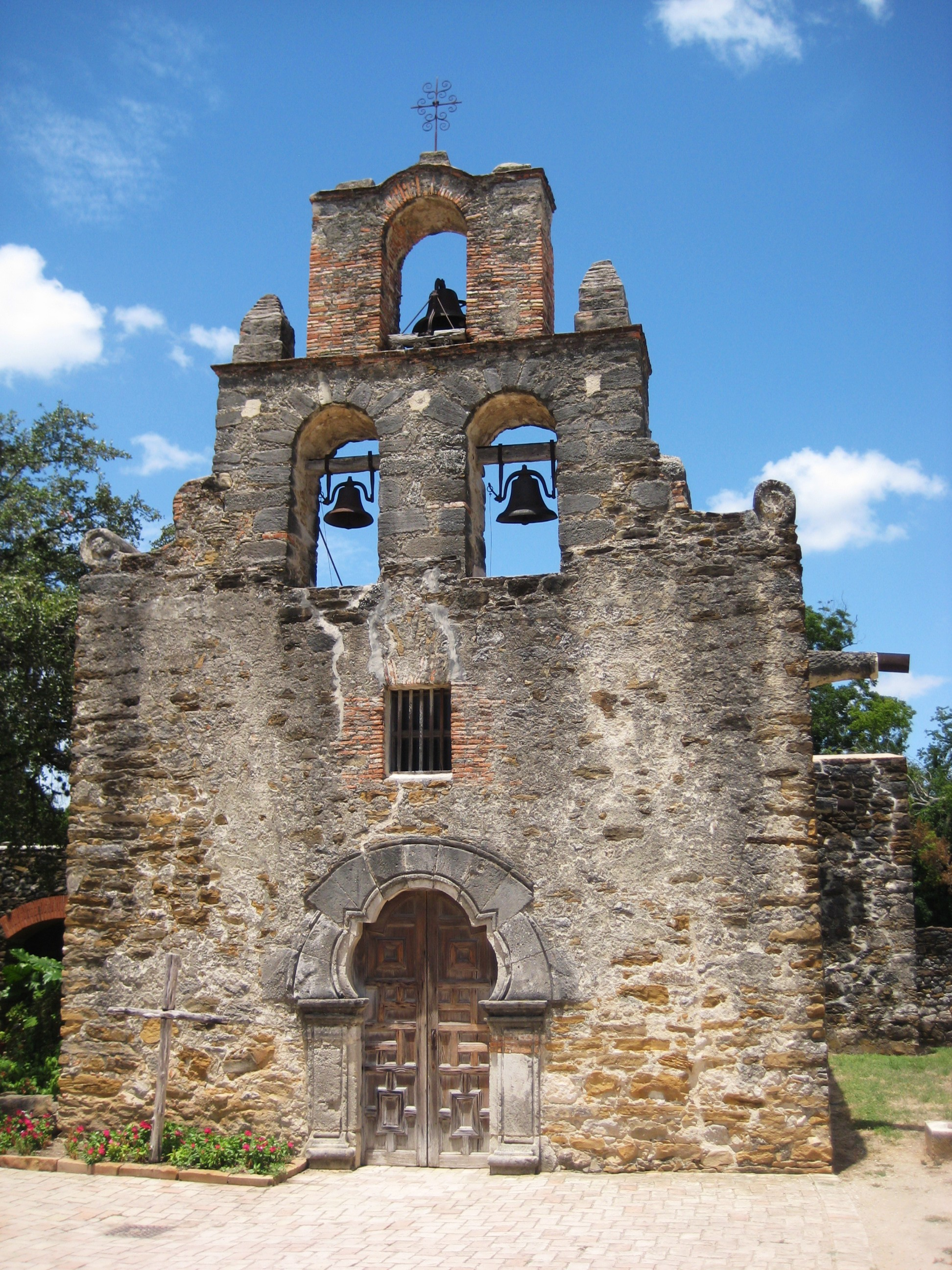
- The church of Mission San Francisco de la Espada.

- Location within Texas

Religion
- Affiliation: Catholic (Roman Rite)

Location
- Location: San Antonio, Texas, U.S.
- Coordinates: 29.317833°N 98.449968°W

Architecture
- Style: Spanish Colonial
- Completed: Founded 1690
- UNESCO World Heritage Site
- Criteria: Cultural: (ii)
- Designated: 2015 (39th session)
- Parent listing: San Antonio Missions
- Reference no.: 1466-001
- State Party: United States
- Region: Europe and North America
- U.S. National Register of Historic Places
- Designated: February 23, 1972; January 28, 1974
- Reference no.: 72001351; 74002324

Mission San Francisco de la Espada (also Mission Espada) is a Roman Rite Catholic mission established in 1690 by Spain and relocated in 1731 to present-day San Antonio, Texas, in what was then known as northern New Spain. The mission was built in order to convert local Native Americans to Christianity and solidify Spanish territorial claims in the New World against encroachment from France. Today, the structure is one of four missions that comprise San Antonio Missions National Historical Park.

== History ==
Founded in 1690 as San Francisco de los Tejas near Weches, Texas, and southwest of present-day Alto, Texas, Mission San Francisco de la Espada was the second mission established in Texas. The mission focused on converting Coahuiltecan and Nabedache Indians.

Three priests, three soldiers and supplies were left among the Nabedache Indians. The new mission was dedicated on June 1, 1690. A smallpox epidemic in the winter of 1690–1691 killed an estimated 3,300 people in the area. The Nabedache believed the Spaniards brought the disease and hostilities developed between the two groups.

Drought besieged the mission in the summers of 1691 and 1692, and the Nabedache wished to get rid of the mission. Under threat of personal attack, the priests began packing their belongings in the fall of 1693. On October 25, 1693, the padres burned the mission and retreated toward Monclova. The party lost its way and did not reach Monclova until February 17, 1694.

The mission was re-established in the same area on July 5, 1716, by the Domingo Ramón-St. Denis expedition. It was named as Nuestro Padre San Francisco de los Tejas. The new mission had to be abandoned in 1719 because of conflict between Spain and France.

The mission was tried once more on August 5, 1721, as San Francisco de los Neches. As the Nabedache were no longer interested in the mission, and France had abandoned effort to lay claim in the area, the mission was temporarily relocated along the Colorado River in July 1730. Mission Tejas State Park encompasses the original site of the mission.

The mission relocated to its current location in the San Antonio River area (coordinates 29.3177°, -98.4498°) in March 1731 and was renamed San Francisco de la Espada. Don Juan Antonio Pérez de Almazán (Captain of San Antonio de Béxar) would then go on to transfer possession of the mission from New Spain to the Indians, namely the chief of the Pacao nation. They would, however, still be expected to convert to Christianity, perform farm labor, and were governed by Governor Manuel de Sandoval.

Rebellion from the Indigenous populations within the mission arose again in June 1737 when only one Indian out of one hundred thirty-seven remained due to the punishments that the priests would administer to them. These accusations would then be ignored, resulting in all Coahuiltecans permanently fleeing from the mission.

A friary was built in 1745, and the church was completed in 1756. The relocation was in part inspired by fears of French encroachment and need for more missionaries to tend to San Antonio de Bexar's Indian population. The mission encountered great difficulties in presiding over the Indian population and experienced common rebellious activity.

Several modern churches have been architecturally based on the design of this mission, including St. Stephen's Episcopal Church in Wimberley, Texas, north of San Antonio. Descendants of the Indigenous tribes that were once a part of the mission are Tap Pilam Coahuiltecan Nation and Caddo.

== Rancho de las Cabras ==
Rancho de las Cabras was established between 1750 and 1760, 30 miles (48 km) southeast of San Antonio de Bexar under the jurisdiction of Mission Espada, so as to provide land for cultivation of crops and livestock for the Mission's population without intruding on private lands. The ranch was primarily made up by low fences and thatched buildings known as jacales for the native workforce to inhabit. According to ethno-historian T.N. Campbell, the ranch was likely constructed by Indians not native to Texas. The ranch was subsequently secularized and owned by María del Carmen Calvillo. It is listed separately as part of the World Heritage Site.

== Espada Acequia ==
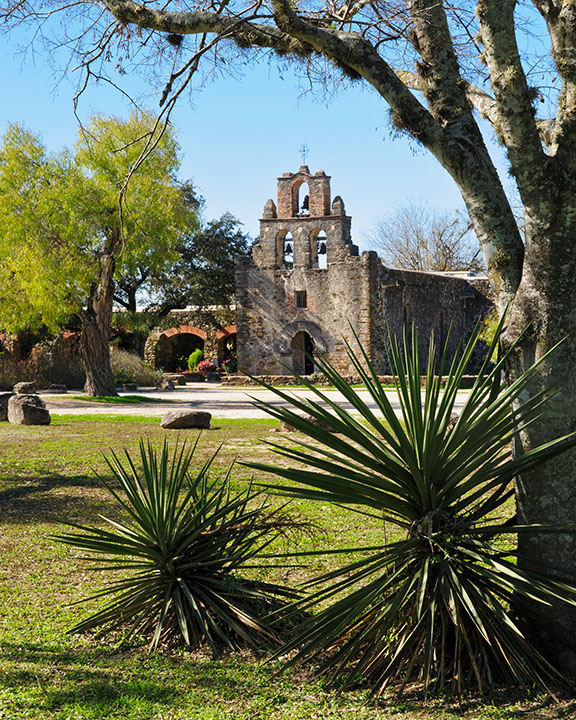
Mission Espada, 2011

Mission San Francisco de la Espada's acequia and aqueduct can still be seen today. The main ditch continues to carry water to the mission and its former farm lands. This water is still used by residents living on these neighboring lands.

The use of acequias was originally brought to the arid regions of Spain and Portugal by the Romans and the Moors. When Franciscan missionaries arrived in the desert Southwest they found the system worked well in the hot, dry environment.

In order to distribute water to the missions along the San Antonio River, Franciscan missionaries oversaw the construction of seven gravity-flow ditches, dams, and at least one aqueduct – a 15-mile (24 km) network that irrigated approximately 3,500 acres (14 km^{2}) of land.

== Gallery ==
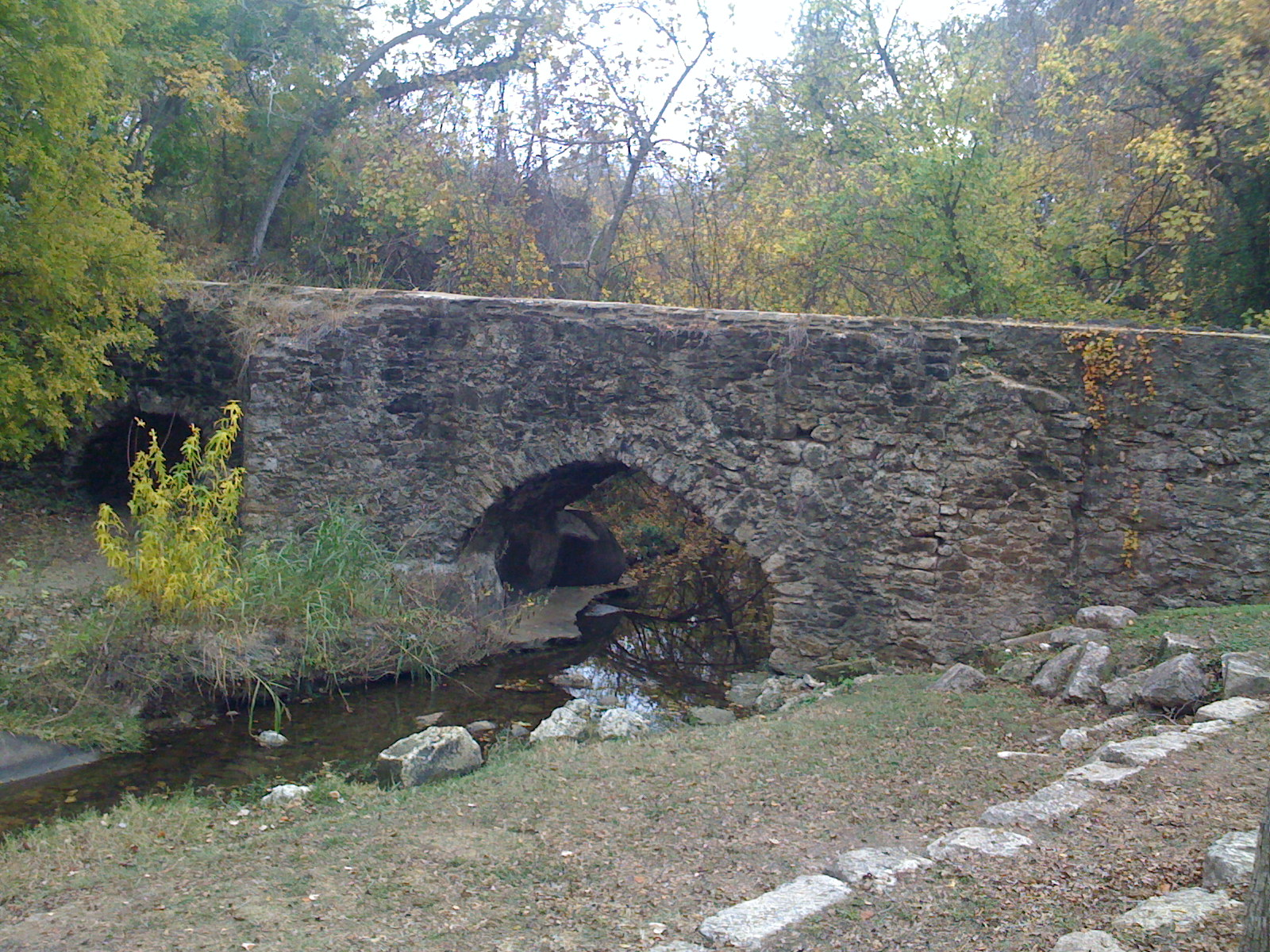
The Espada aqueduct as it crosses Piedras creek

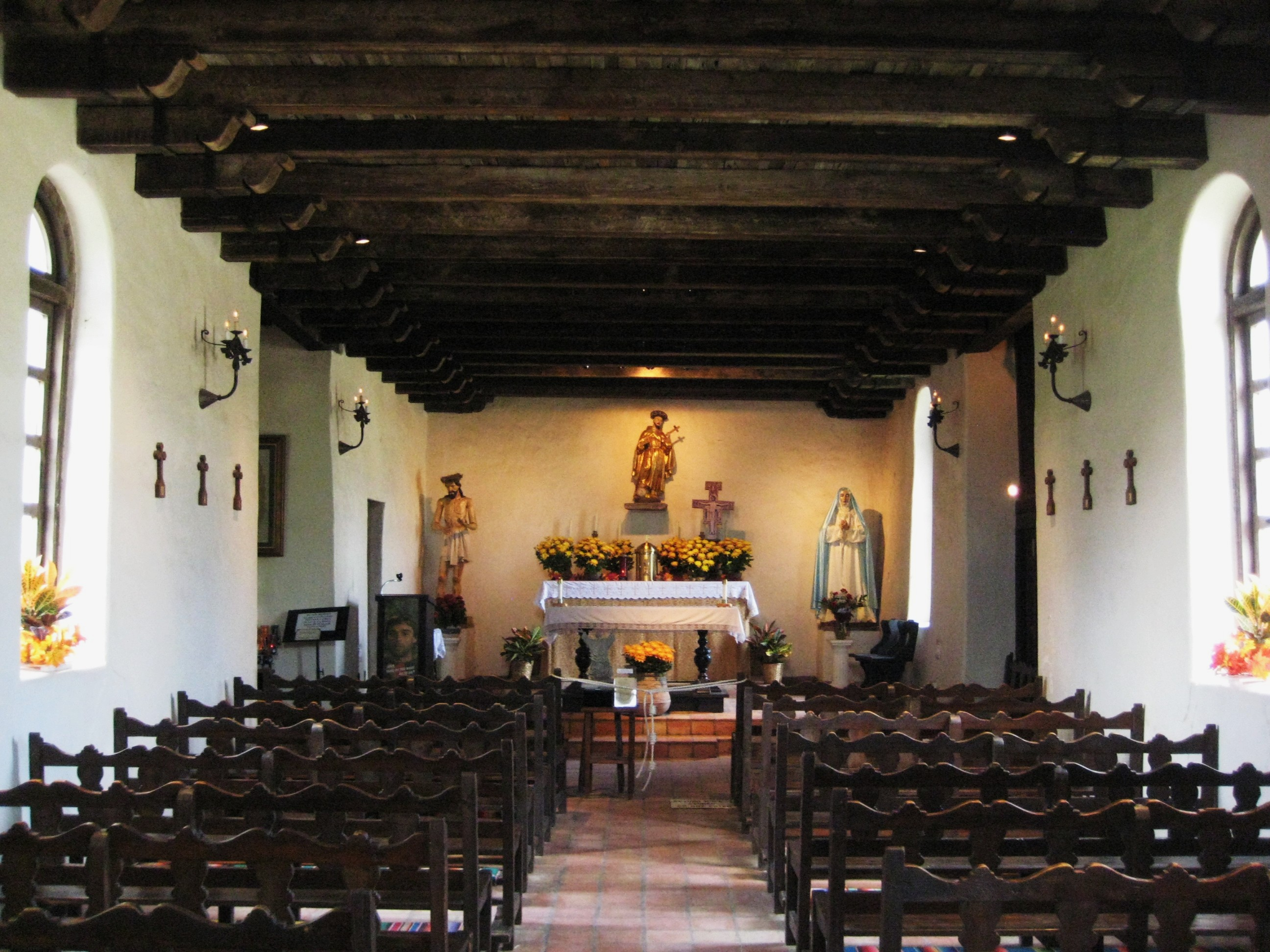
Interior of the church

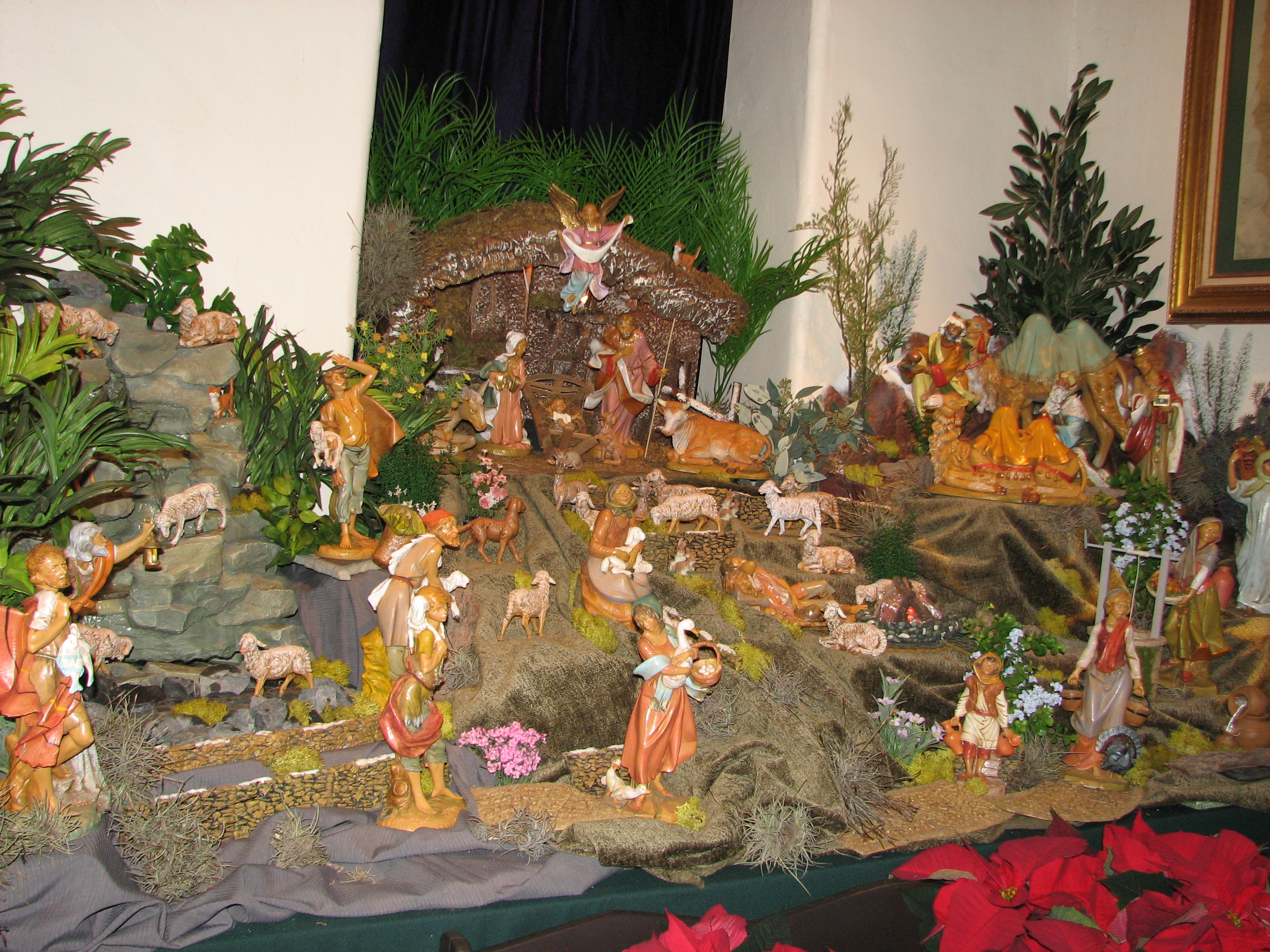
Nativity scene, 2009

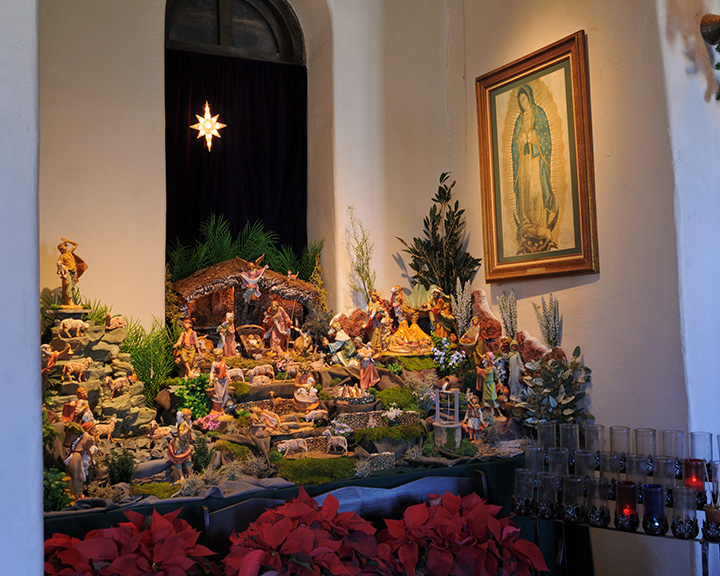
Nativity scene, 2011

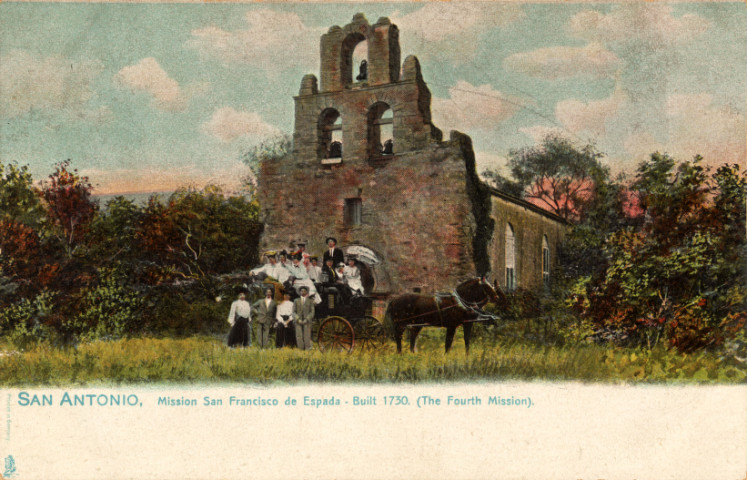
Mission San Francisco de Espada, San Antonio, Texas (postcard, 1901–1907)

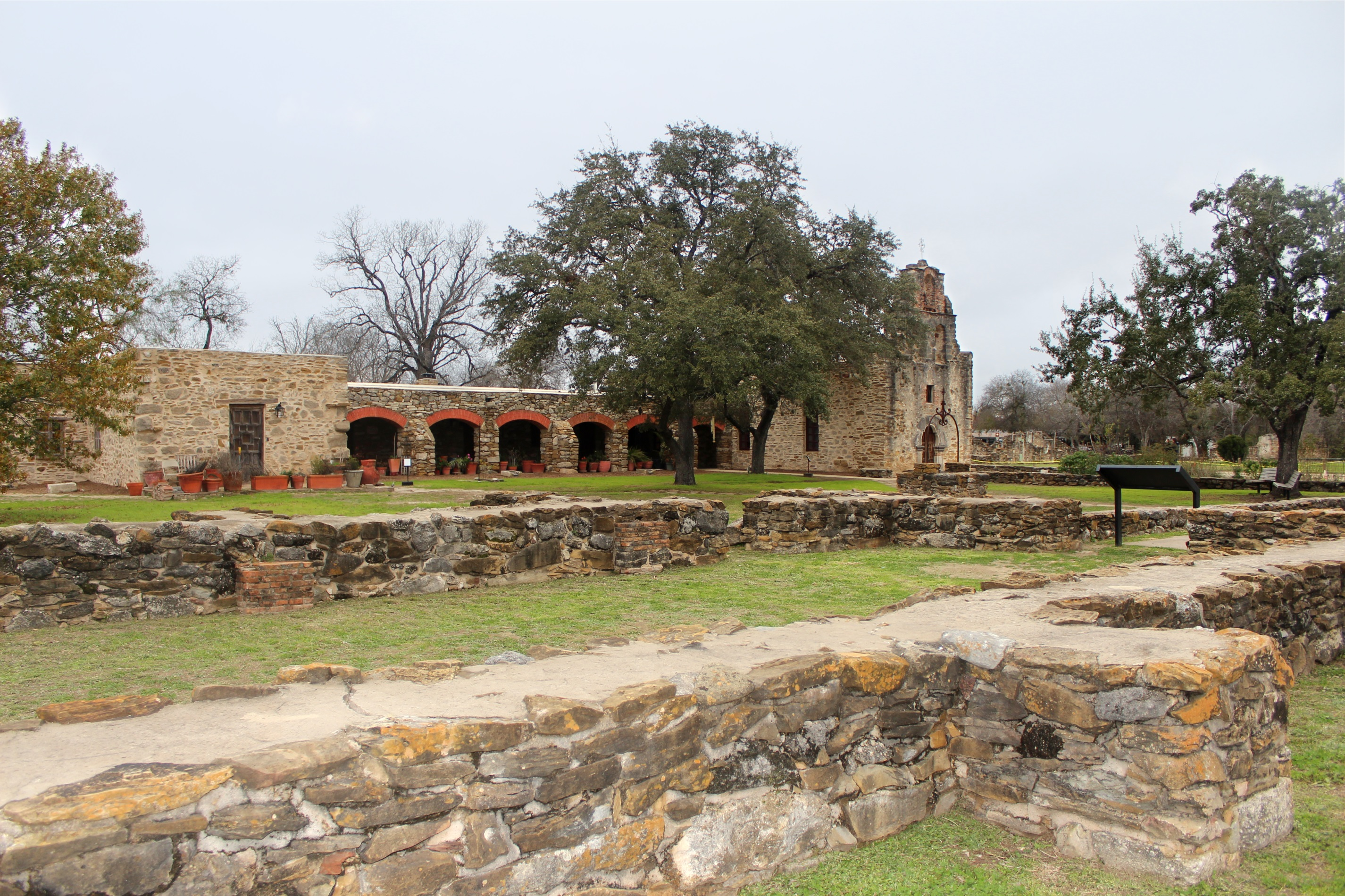
Exterior of Mission San Francisco de la Espada (2015)

== See also ==
- Caddo
- Mission Nuestra Señora de la Purísima Concepción de Acuña
- Mission San José y San Miguel de Aguayo
- Mission San Juan Capistrano
- Spanish missions in Texas
- Tap Pilam Coahuiltecan Nation
