= Matías de Aguirre =

Spanish military man, governor and administrator

5th Governor of Texas and 7th of Coahuila
- In office 1703–1705
- Preceded by: Francisco Cuervo y Valdez
- Succeeded by: Martín de Alarcón

Personal details
- Profession: Political

Matías de Aguirre or Mathías de Aguirre (Coahuila, 1682–1723) was a Spanish military man, governor and administrator of the 18th century.

== Biography ==
There are records of his participation in the Navy.

Matías de Aguirre served as governor of Province of Coahuila and New Philippines from 1703 to 1705, which was administered from Monclova.

By order of Viceroy José Sarmiento de Valladares, he organized an expedition to expel the French settlers, who had settled east of New Philippines (present-day Texas) and came from Louisiana, New France. News of the French threat had been reported by Native American traders in Texas, who reported that the French had settled among the Caddo people. The expeditionary force was led by Buenaventura de Aguirre, who was the captain of the Presidio of San Juan Bautista del Río Grande del Norte (present-day Guerrero, Coahuila, Mexico). The presidio had been founded in 1701. The expedition, which included Coahuila, failed to locate the French outposts.

In 1708 Aguirre served as ordinary mayor of Monterrey (Nuevo León), and in 1715 as chief constable. Aguirre also owned agricultural property and was a merchant. There records of a foundry or ironworks estate he owned in Nuevo León in 1720 for 2,400 pesos.

At some point, Aguirre also led the supply convoys that operated in the aforementioned Presidio of Río Grande.
