= Yojuane =

Ancient Texas indigenous tribe

Regions with significant populations
- (Texas)

Languages
- Tonkawa language or Jumano language

Religion
- traditional tribal religion

Related ethnic groups
- Jumano Indians

The Yojuane were a people who lived in Texas in the 16th, 17th and 18th centuries. They may associated with the Jumano, part of the "Jumano exchange network", and also been related to the Tonkawa, although this association is debated. They have no connection to the Yowani in Texas, a Choctaw band. Anderson has proposed that there is little evidence on the origins of the Yojuane, including the meaning of the name.

== Language ==
Many scholars starting with Herbert E. Bolton have held the view that the Yojuane spoke the Tonkawa language or a language related to it. However Gary Anderson argues that the Yojuane spoke the same language or a related language to the Jumano Indians and that this was a Uto-Aztecan language, largely based on the ability of Nahuatl speakers to converse with the Jumano and Yojuane when they first met as part of the Spanish expeditions. But the Jumano language may have been Tanoan, recognized as a major family of Pueblo languages. As long distance traders the Jumano's ability to converse with peoples of different languages was necessary but did not mean that, for example, Tonkawa or Nahuatl was their native tongue.

== History ==
The Yojuane were first mentioned by Spanish chroniclers about 1690. At this time they were led by a man named Cantana who had been on occasion to Nueva Vizcaya, New Spain, essentially modern Chihuahua. Cantana was closely connected with the Jumano of La Junta de los Rios although it is less clear where his people lived at the time. According to Gary Anderson the Yojuane numbered about 1000 at this time. However these included the Cholemes and Cabezas, peoples who seemed to be distinct. Also associated with the Yojuane were the Simonos and Tusonibis or Tosonibis who had recently fled from Nuevo Leon to join the Yojuane due to the Spanish incursion into that area. In 1709 when Isidro de Espinosa met a hunting party of Yojuane the Simonos and Tusonibis were still distinct groups but also hunting with the part.

In the 1740s the Yojuane along with their allies the Deadoses, Mayeyes and Ervipiames asked for Franciscan missions to be established for them. They later moved into missions along the San Gabriel River, moving south and west of the Rancheria Grande.

In March 1749 there were only 74 Yojuane people counted at the Mission San Francisco Xavier along the San Gabriel River, but there may have been others who were not in the mission.

In 1759 a Yojuane camp was attacked by an expedition of Spaniards and Apaches, with by some accounts a third of the population killed, another third escaping and a third taken as captives. Other sources suggest that 55 Yojuanes were killed and 149, all women and children, were taken captive. Many of the captives died of smallpox while those who survived were made into slaves. (See Battle of the Twin Villages)

Among these was a boy who was sold to a Spanish soldier who gave the child the name Miguel Perez. Perez became a Hispanicized Indian of San Antonio but he continued to maintain contact with the Yojuanes. In 1786 Perez was recruited to convince the Yojuanes and their Tonkawa allies to go to war with the Lipan Apache. Perez was able to convince the Yojuane such a war was advisable, and they joined with the Tawakonis, Iscanis, and Flechazos in attacking the Apaches.

== Sources ==
- Anderson, Gary Clayton. The Indian Southwest, 1580-1830: Ethnogenesis and Reinvention. Norman: University of Oklahoma Press, 1999.
- Barr, Juliana. Peace Came in the Form of a Woman: Indians and Spaniards in the Texas Borderlands. Chapel Hill: University of North Carolina Press, 2007.
- John, Elizabeth. Storms Brewed in Other Men's Worlds: The Confrontation of Indians, Spanish and French in the Southwest, 1540-1795. College Station: Texas A&M University Press, 1975.
- Hickerson, Nancy Parrott. The Jumanos: Hunters and Traders of the South Plains, University of Texas Press, first edition 1994
