= Mayeye =

Extinct Native American tribe from Texas

Total population
- extinct as a tribe since early 19th century

Regions with significant populations
- United States (Texas)

Languages
- Tonkawa language

Religion
- Indigenous religion

Related ethnic groups
- Tonkawa, Karankawa

The Mayeye were a Tonkawa–speaking Native American people, who once lived in southeastern Texas. Coastal Mayeyes likely were absorbed into Karankawa communities. Inland Mayeyes likely joined larger Tonkawa communities.

== Name ==
Their name was also written as: Macheye, Maheye, Maiece, Maieye, Malleye, Maye, Meghay, and Muleye.

== History ==
The Mayeye lived in the Rancheria Grande along the Brazos River in what is today eastern Texas. In the 1830s some Mayeye were among the Native Americans living at Mission San Antonio de Valero. At least some of the Mayeye at that location returned to the Brazos River region, against the will of the missionaries at the mission.

Although the baptized Mayeye did not like being so far from their non-mission relatives, they did see some advantages to the mission system. They along with the Yojuanes, Ervipiames, Deadoses, and Bidais sought a Spanish mission in their land to give them a military advantage against the Lipan Apaches in 1745. The Mayeye were among the most prominent and enthusiastic group to settle in the San Gabriel River missions in 1748.

In 1749 there were 63 Mayeye in the mission. By no means was this all the Mayeye. The Marques de Rubi counted several times this many Mayeye on his tour of Texas in 1766-1768. When the San Gabriel valley missions were abandoned in the early 1750s some of the Mayeye had moved back to Mission San Antonio de Valero, and there were people still identified as Mayeye at that location until at least some point in the 1760s.

In the 1770s some of the Mayeye moved to the coast and joined with the Coco people, a Karankawa tribe. As late as 1805 Mayeye were reported at the mouth of the Guadalupe River; however, after this time they appear to have been absorbed into other Tonkawa groups, merged with the coastal Karankawa groups or been Hispanacized in the missions.

The linguist Andrée F. Sjoberg argued that the Mayeye were the same as the Yakwal, a coastal band of Tonkawa.
