= El Cuilón =

El Cuilón (born about 1680), also known as Juan Rodriguez, was a leader of the Ervipiame during the 18th century and, at least by Spanish standards, the overall leader of the Rancheria Grande, a large and numerous collection of Native American tribes between the Brazos River and the Colorado River in what is today eastern Texas in the United States.

El Cuilón was born in what is today Coahuila, probably between the Rio Grande and the Rio Salado. He spent some time at Mission San Francisco Vizarron in about 1699 before moving north-eastward to join other Ervipiame who had already migrated to eastern Texas.

El Cuilón was given a baton of command by Martin de Alarcón in 1719, indicating that at least the Ervipiame held him in high respect. In 1721 El Cuilón was the lead negotiator for the Rancheria Grande tribes with the Marques de Aguayo.

In 1722 El Cuilón was the leader of the Ervipiame and associated tribes who settled at Mission San Francisco de Najera, in the general vicinity of modern San Antonio, Texas.

== Sources ==
- Barr, Juliana. Peace Came in the Form of a Woman: Indians and Spaniards in the Texas Borderlands. Chapel Hill: University of North Carolina Press, 2007.
