= Domingo Ramón (explorer) =

José Domingo Ramón
- Died: December 23, 1723; La Bahia, Texas, New Spain, Spanish Empire
- Occupation: Explorer

José Domingo Ramón (?-December 23, 1723) was a Spanish military man and explorer who founded several missions and a presidio in East Texas to prevent French expansion in the area.

== Biography ==
Domingo Ramón was born to Diego Ramón, a soldier who served as commander of the Presidio San Juan Bautista in Coahuila, in the modern Mexico.

In 1715, Ramón was appointed commander of a Spanish expedition whose purpose was to go to East Texas. The objective of the expedition was the foundation of four religious missions, as well as a presidio to prevent French expansion from Louisiana.

The expedition, led by the Quebecer official commander Louis Juchereau de St. Denis, began its journey in San Juan Bautista (present-day Guerrero, Coahuila) on April 12, 1716 and was made up by seventy-five members (among them twelve friars, including Isidro de Espinosa, and more than twenty civilians).

Finally, Ramon's team arrived in the east of the territory in late June. Once there, the team went through a lot of places. The expedition toured Los Adaes, Nacogdoches (although the latter city had previously had a French settlement), and San Antonio. In addition, the team passed through the vicinity of the Sabine, Brazos, Little, San Antonio, and San Gabriel rivers, and of Onion, Salado, Cibolo, and Rosillo creeks. In addition, the team also discovered the Comal Springs. The expedition team named almost all water places (rivers, creeks) with their modern names. Thus, Ramón named the San Antonio River after him because he discovered it on Anthony of Padua's Day (in Spanish: San Antonio de Padua), while the Brazos, Little and San Gabriel rivers were originally named Brazos de Dios (Arms of God), San Andrés and San Javier respectively.

Ramón included in his diary observations of certain indigenous tribes of the zone, such as the Nacono. It was in the middle of his expedition that New Philippines was first recorded as name for the territory he was exploring and settling, on a letter to the Marquess of Valero, written by Antonio Margil on July 20, 1716.

The expedition successfully established the missions entrusted to it. Thus, the following were founded: Nuestro Padre San Francisco de los Tejas Mission (established near Weches, Texas on July 5. 1716), Nuestra Señora de la Purísima Concepción de Acuña (established by the group of Franciscans of the expedition in San Antonio), Nuestra Señora de Guadalupe (in Nacogdoches), and San José de los Nazonis (near Cushing, in Nacogdoches).

In early 1717, Denis and Ramon returned to East Texas, where they established the missions Nuestra Señora de los Dolores de los Ais (in San Augustine) and San Miguel de Linares de los Adaes.

In 1719, coinciding with the outbreak of the Chicken War (the War of the Quadruple Alliance faction that was developed in Texas), Ramon left East Texas to move to San Antonio along with the rest of the Spaniards who had been living there.

After two years residing in that city, Ramon left for Matagorda Bay with a group of forty men and he settled on the shores of the bay.

In December 1723 Ramon was attacked by a Karankawa man, whose tribe had rebelled against the Spaniards at La Bahia. The Karankawa attack caused his death.

== Personal life ==
Ramón married Luisa Maldonado de Orandai. It is known they were parents of three sons, which were named as Diego, Juan Domingo, and Miguel. It is not known if they had more children.
