= Neche people =

The Neche were a Native American tribe from eastern Texas.

== History ==
The Neche were part of the Hasinai branch of the Caddo Confederacy. During the late 17th and early 18th centuries, they settled along the Neches River, in present-day Houston and Cherokee counties. Their lands were directly northwest of the Nacono tribe.

In 1779 Spanish explorer Athanase de Mézières recorded seeing several mounds in Hasinai territory. He wrote that the mounds were created by the local Indians, "in order to build on its top a temple, which overlooked the pueblo nearby, and in which they worshiped their gods a monument rather to their great numbers than to the industry of their individuals." A larger mound and two smaller ones still stand in Cherokee County.

Spanish Franciscan friars founded the San Francisco de los Neches Mission and accompanying presidio near the Neche in 1716. The mission was temporarily abandoned in 1719 due to fears of French attacks, but when the Spanish returned in 1721, they presented the Neche chief, with a baston or token of authority and they provided clothing for 188 Neche men, women, and children. In 1730 the mission was closed.

Meanwhile, the Neche followed their traditional religion and maintained a major fire temple and a lesser temple in their territory.

Ultimately, they assimilated into other Hasinai tribes in the 19th century. In 1855 the Neches were forced with other Hasinai onto the Brazos Indian Reservation, located in Young County, Texas. In 1859 they were all removed to Indian Territory. They are enrolled in the Caddo Nation of Oklahoma today. They would also hunt game.

== Namesake ==
The Neches River was named for the tribe.

== Synonymy ==
The tribe is also known as the Neches, Nacha, Naesha, Nascha, Nesta, Nouista, Nacoche, Nechas, and Neitas.
