= Rosillo Creek =

Stream in Bexar County, Texas, United States

Coordinates: 29°31′N 98°22′W

- Map

Location
- Country: United States
- State: Texas

Rosillo Creek begins approximately 0.5 miles north of FM 1976, in northeastern Bexar County, Texas, within the city limits of Windcrest, Texas, and flows southwestward for 18 miles through the Rosillo Creek Basin. The creek has an elevation ranging from 265 meters above sea level, to 155 meters above sea level. The vegetation of the basin is mostly mesquite trees and grasses. Rosillo Creek empties into Salado Creek in southeastern Bexar County.

== History ==
Rosillo Creek was given its name in 1716 by Spanish explorer Domingo Ramón. It was the site of the Battle of Rosillo Creek in 1813.

== See also ==
- List of rivers of Texas
