= Ervipiame =

Historic Indigenous tribe of Mexico and U.S. (Texas)

Total population
- extinct as a tribe, likely merged with Tonkawa

Regions with significant populations
- southern Texas, U.S.; northeastern Coahuila, Mexico

Languages
- Coahuiltecan languages

Religion
- Indigenous religion, Roman Catholicism

Related ethnic groups
- other Coahuiltecan peoples, later Tonkawa

The Ervipiame were an Indigenous people of what is now northeastern Coahuila and southern Texas. They were a Coahuitecan people, who likely merged into the Tonkawa.

== Name ==
The Ervipiame were also known as the Chivipane, Cibipane, Hierbipiane, Huvipane, Hyerbipiame, Yerbipiame, Yrbipia, Herbipiames, Yurbipames, Hervipiames, Yerbiapames, Barbipianes, Berttipanes, Irripianes, and Jerbipiam.

== History ==
=== 16th century ===
Beginning in the 16th century, Spanish settlement in what is today Northern Mexico and the accompanying diseases and slave raiding to supply ranches and mines with Indigenous labor had disruptive effects upon the inhabitants of the region

=== 17th century ===
The Ervipiame were first written about in 1673, when the Spanish encountered them in northeastern Coahuila. The Bosque-Larios expedition encountered them in 1675 in the Edwards Plateau of southern Texas.

By the 17th century, Spanish colonists disrupted the lower Rio Grande Valley. In 1698, some Ervipiame joined Spanish missions in northern Coahuila.

=== 18th century ===
Some of them entered Mission San Juan Bautista and Mission San Francisco Vizzaron when these missions were founded about 1700.

Later the Ervipiame were one of several people that lived in the Rancheria Grande along the Brazos River in what is today eastern Texas. They lived there by the 1710s. By 1719 they were led by a man named El Cuilón who the Spanish tried to set up as the leader of the Rancheria Grande.

In 1722 El Cuilón lead a group of Rancheria Grande residents, many of them Erviiapame, westward to settle at Mission San Francisco Xavier de Najera. Later in the 1720s some of the Erviapame moved to Mission San Antonio de Valero. However they often only stayed there a short time and many of them were classed as "runaways" by the Spanish. Mariano Francisco de los Dolores y Viana starting before 1735 made annual trips to the Rancheria Grande and tried to get the Ervipiame and other groups there to move to the missions around San Antonio.

Although many Ervipiame had fled the San Antonio missions they did see some advantages to the mission system and in 1745 sent a delegation along with the Yojuanes, Deadoses, and other residents of the Rancheria Grande to ask that a mission be built along the Brazos.

In 1722, when the Spanish founded Mission San Francisco Xavier de Horcasitas on the San Gabriel River, the Ervipiame maintained a village nearby. In 1747 some of the Ervipiame moved to the mission.

=== 19th century ===
Throughout the 19th century, Ervipiame were seldom mentioned, and they likely merged into the Tonkawa people.
