= Mission Dolores State Historic Site =

- Mission Nuestra Senora de los Dolores de los Ais Site
- U.S. National Register of Historic Places
- Texas State Historic Site
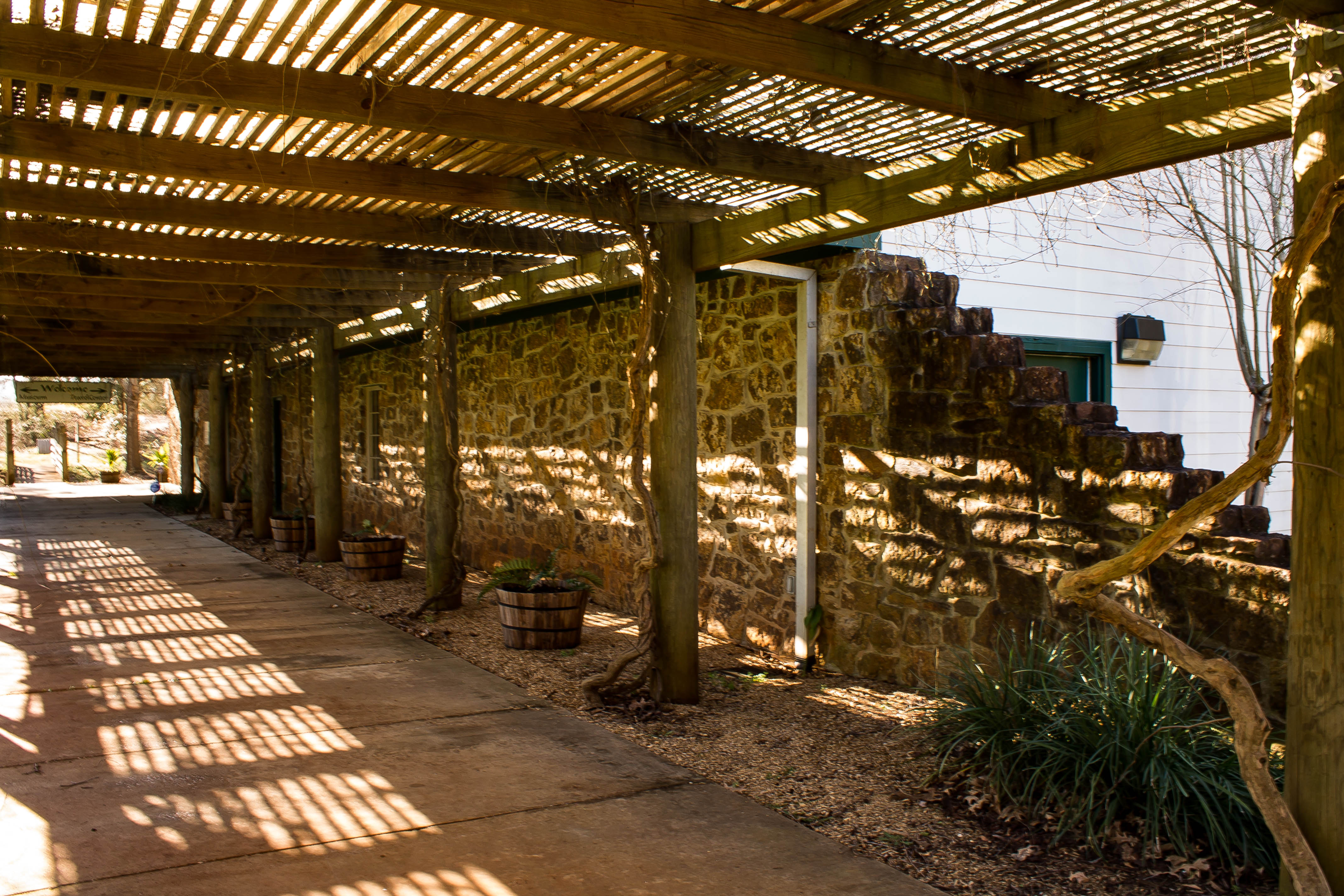
- Mission Dolores State Historic Site

- Location within Texas Location within the United States
- Location: 701 S. Broadway St., San Augustine, Texas
- Coordinates: 31°31′26″N 94°6′48″W
- Area: 9 acres (3.6 ha)
- Built: 1722
- Website: Mission Dolores State Historic Site
- NRHP reference No.: 77001475

Significant dates
- Added to NRHP: December 16, 1977
- Designated TSHS: 2016

Mission Dolores State Historic Site (41SA25) (also known as the Mission Nuestra Señora de los Dolores de los Ais) is a 36-acre historic site including a 9-acre (3.6 ha) archaeological site listed on the National Register of Historic Places in San Augustine County, Texas that preserves the location of a Franciscan mission originally established in 1721. The site is located on the original El Camino Real de los Tejas trail. The site has no above ground remains of the mission but the mission's location is confirmed through archeological excavations. It is located half a mile south of San Augustine in the Piney Woods region of East Texas. Operated by the Texas Historical Commission, the site includes a campground, museum, gift shop and hiking trails.

== Description ==
The mission was founded in 1717 by Father Antonio Margil and Francisco Hidalgo as part of the Ramon Expedition. The Spanish sought to solidify their claims on Spanish Texas by establishing missions and presidios throughout the border area with French Louisiana. Mission Dolores was one of 6 missions founded in East Texas. Located on Ayish Bayou, the small contingent of priests and soldiers worked to convert the native Ais Indians to Roman Catholicism. In 1719, the East Texas missions were abandoned following conflicts between the French and Spanish at Los Adaes. Margil and other missionaries retreated to San Antonio de Bexar. In San Antonio, Margil established Mission San José (Texas).

In 1721, the Spanish returned to East Texas and Mission Dolores was reestablished a short distance from its original location. This second location is preserved at Mission Dolores State Historic Site. The mission operated from 1721 until 1773 when the East Texas missions were once again closed. Despite operating for 52 years, the mission was not highly successful. The Ais did not live at the mission and were hesitant to accept this new religion. The missionaries baptized approximately 30 natives in 52 years. Most of the baptisms also happened at the point of death, leading many Ais to fear the baptismal waters believing the water brought death.

Only a handful of Europeans lived at Mission Dolores over the 52 years of occupation. Normally one or two priests lived at the mission with two soldiers and their families. Due to the extreme distance from the Spanish government in Mexico City, the missionaries often traded illegally with the closer French traders in Natchitoches, Louisiana.

The mission was abandoned in 1773. Anglo-American settlement began in the early nineteenth century and led to the establishment of San Augustine, Texas. The town grew up about half a mile from the mission location. According to contemporary newspapers, the American settlers were aware there was a mission south of town on "Mission Hill" but there were no longer any remains. The property remained in private hands and numerous homesteads were constructed on it throughout the nineteenth and early twentieth centuries.

== Archeological Excavations ==
Professional excavations began in the 1970s to determine the exact location of Mission Dolores. Dr. Kathleen Gilmore led the first investigation but her excavations were inconclusive. Dr. James Corbin of Stephen F. Austin State University led several field schools in the area and finally scientifically confirmed the location of Mission Dolores. Unfortunately the construction of Highway 147 destroyed approximately half of the site. However, Corbin was able to locate middens, wells, post holes and other features associated with the mission and recovered numerous 18th century artifacts.

Archeological investigations have continued since then. New evidence suggests the mission compound may be larger than originally thought. Recent technology has also been able to confirm the existence of an intact segment of El Camino Real de los Tejas National Historic Trail on the property, which would have run directly through the mission compound.

== Preservation ==
The site of Mission Dolores had been preserved by landowners and community members throughout the latter half of the twentieth century. In the late nineties, the City of San Augustine received a grant to construct a museum, campground and archeology laboratory on the site. In 2016, the City of San Augustine requested that the Texas Historical Commission assume ownership and operation of the site. The request was accepted and Mission Dolores became the 21st State Historic Site and first Spanish Colonial site operated by the Texas Historical Commission. Future plans for the site include renovating and updating the museum exhibits, installing interpretive signage on the trails, and potentially constructing a historically accurate mission building. Educational programs at the site provide further insight into the history of the mission and other cultural resources of East Texas.

== See also ==
- Spanish missions in Texas
- National Register of Historic Places listings in San Augustine County, Texas
