= College of Guadalupe de Zacatecas =

The College of Guadalupe de Zacatecas was a Roman Catholic Franciscan missionary college, or seminary (Colegio Apostolico), founded in Guadalupe, Zacatecas (Mexico) by the Order of Friars Minor between 1703 and 1707. The institution was established to provide specific training for priests who were to work among the indigenous populations in the Spanish colonial Viceroyalty of New Spain, present day Mexico and the southwestern United States.

Of the thirty-eight Spanish missions in Spanish Texas, including the one in Spanish Louisiana, and the six visitas (country chapels) on the lower Rio Grande, nine missions and all six visitas were staffed by the College of Zacatecas.

== See also ==
- College of San Fernando de Mexico
- College of Santa Cruz de Querétaro
- Spanish missions in Louisiana
- Spanish missions in Texas
