= Tonkawa language =

Native American language

Tonkawa
- Native to: United States
- Region: Western Oklahoma, South-central Texas and into New Mexico
- Ethnicity: Tonkawa, Mayeye
- Extinct: c. 1940
- Revival: late 2010s
- Language family: Language isolate

Language codes
- ISO 639-3: tqw
- Glottolog: tonk1249
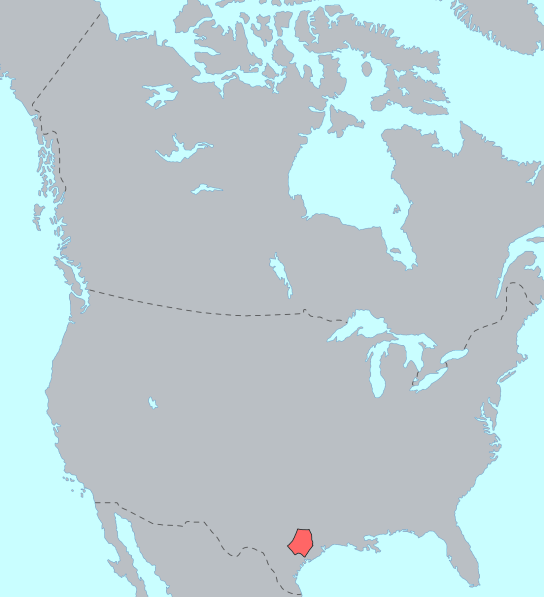
- Pre-contact distribution of the Tonkawa language

The Tonkawa language was a language spoken in Oklahoma, Texas, and New Mexico by the Tonkawa people. A language isolate, with no known related languages, Tonkawa has not had L1 (first language) speakers since the mid 20th century. Few Tonkawa people speak the language, but revitalization is underway.

== Phonology ==
=== Vowels ===
Tonkawa has 10 vowels:

	Front		Central		Back	
	short	long	short	long	short	long
Close	i	iː			u	uː
Mid	e	eː			o	oː
Open			a	aː		

- Each vowel is distinguished by the quality of sound and the length of the vowel.
- The vowels occur in five pairs that have differing vowel lengths (i.e. short vowels vs. long vowels).
- In the front and the mid back vowel pairs, the short vowels are phonetically lower than their long counterparts: /i/ → [ɪ], /e/ → [ɛ], /o/ → [ɔ].
- The low vowels /a, aː/ vary between central and back articulations: [a~ɑ, aː~ɑː].
- Vowels that are followed by j and w are slightly raised in their position of articulation

=== Consonants ===
Tonkawa has 15 consonants:

	Bilabial	Coronal	Dorsal		Glottal
	Bilabial	Coronal	plain	labial	Glottal
Nasal	m	n			
Plosive	p	t	k	kʷ	ʔ
Affricate		t͡s			
Fricative		s	x	xʷ	h
Approximant		l	j	w	

- The affricate /ts/ and fricative /s/ vary freely between dental and postalveolar articulations, i.e. [ts~tʃ] and [s~ʃ]. There is a tendency for [ʃ] to occur at the end of words (but no tendency for [tʃ]).
- The other coronals /t, n, l/ are consistently dental.
- The dorsal obstruents are produced with a palatal place of articulation before front vowels /i, iː, e, eː/, otherwise they are velar:
  - /k, kʷ, x, xʷ/ → [c, cʷ, ç, çʷ]
- The dorsal approximants /j, w/ are consistently palatal and labiovelar respectively.

=== Consonant clusters ===
There are two environments in which consonant clusters occur in Tonkawa:

- when a consonant is repeated
- when the cluster is within the syllable

Repeated or identical consonants are treated as one unit. However, the condition that causes this repetition has not been fully analyzed.

- Example: sʔa-ko 'he scrapes it' versus mʔe-t-no 'lightning strikes him'

There are cases where the glottal stop is not used in the cluster or combination

There are certain consonants that can either begin or end in a cluster. However, if the cluster begins the syllable, there can be no intervening vowel.

- Initial Cluster Consonants: kʷ, m, n, s, x
- Final Cluster Consonants: ʔ

=== Phonological processes and morphophonemics ===
Initial stem syllables that begin with h-

- the h- is dropped when a prefix is added
- if the syllable is C + V, then the vowel is lengthened and given the quality of the stem vowel.
- if the syllable ends in a consonant, then the initial stem forms a new syllable with the final consonant of the prefix.

Final stem syllables

- Forms: C V w or C V y
- The form changes to C oː if followed by a suffix that starts with a consonant
- If a long vowel occurs the suffixes change from (-we/-wesʔ/aːdew) to (-oː or -o/oːsʔ/-aːdo)

An interesting feature of Tonkawan phonology is that the vowels in even-numbered syllables are reduced. That is, long vowels are shortened, while short vowels disappear. Analyses of this were given by Kisseberth (1970), Phelps (1973, 1975) and Noske (1993).

=== Syllable structure ===
The Tonkawa language is a syllabic language that bases its word and sentence prosody on even stressed syllables.

- Disyllabic words are when the stress is placed on the final syllable.
- Polysyllabic words are when the stress is moved to the next to last syllable, the penult.

There are five types of syllable arrangements: (C: consonant, CC: consonant cluster, V: vowel)

- C + V → ka-la 'mouth'
- C + V + C → tan-kol 'back of head'
- CC + V → sʔa-ko 'he scrapes it'
- CC + V + C → mʔe-t-no 'lightning strikes him'
- C + V + ʔs or sʔ/ lʔ/ jʔ → jam-xoʔs 'I paint his face'

== Writing system ==
The orthography used on the Tonkawa Tribe's website is based on Americanist phonetic notation.

Alphabet	Pronunciation	Alphabet	Pronunciation
c	/ts/	a	/a/
h	/h/	a·	/aː/
k	/k/	e	/e/
kʷ	/kʷ/	e·	/eː/
l	/l/	i	/i/
m	/m/	i·	/iː/
n	/n/	o	/o/
p	/p/	o·	/oː/
s	/s/	u	/u/
t	/t/	u·	/uː/
w	/w/		
x	/x/		
xʷ	/xʷ/		
y	/j/		
ꞌ	/ʔ/		

Long vowels are indicated with a following middle dot ⟨·⟩. The affricate /ts/ is written ⟨c⟩. The glottal stop /ʔ/ is written as a saltillo ⟨ꞌ⟩. The palatal glide /j/ is written ⟨y⟩.

The phonemic orthography used in Hoijer's Tonkawa Texts is in a slightly different version of Americanist transcription. It uses a colon for long vowels ⟨꞉⟩ and the IPA glottal stop letter ⟨ʔ⟩.

== Morphology ==
In English, pronouns, nouns, verbs, etc., are individual words; Tonkawa forms the parts of speech differently, and the most important grammatical function is affixation. This process shows the subjects, objects, and pronouns of words and/or verbs. Within affixations, the suffix has more importance than the prefix.

The differentiation between subject and object is shown in the suffix. While the word order tends to be subject-object-verb (SOV), compounding words is very common in Tonkawa. Reduplication is very common in Tonkawa and affects only the verb themes. Usually, only one syllable undergoes reduplication, and it notes a repeated action, vigorous action, or a plural subject.

=== Morphemes ===
The morphemes in Tonkawa can be divided as follows:

I. Themes

- Free – the stem can stand alone
- Bound – the stem must have a suffix or prefix attached; it cannot stand alone

In Tonkawa the theme is composed of morphologic units. The basic unit is the stem. The stem is composed of two elements (the consonant and vowel) and modified by affixes. The theme, or stem, is functional, which means it changes as more affixation is added. This leads to the fusion of the stem and affix where it becomes difficult to isolate the word into its smaller units.

II. Affixes

- Transformative – the affix changes the meaning and/or function of the word
- Verbal – the affix changes a certain aspect of the verb
- Noun and Pronoun – the affix changes a certain aspect of the noun or pronoun

III. Enclitics

=== Nouns ===
Nouns function as free themes, or stems, in Tonkawa. There is a limit of only two or three affixes that can compound with a noun. However, there are cases of a bound theme occurring in noun compounds, which occurs with the suffix -an is added. In English, pronouns and nouns are usually grouped together, but because pronouns in Tonkawa are bound themes, they will be discussed with the verb section.

Noun endings
Case	Indefinite (singular/plural)	Definite (singular/plural)
Nominative	-la/ -ka	-ʔaːla/ -ʔaːka
Accusative	-lak/ -kak	-ʔaːlak/ -ʔaːkak
Genitive	-ʔan	-ʔaːlʔan
Dative (Arrival)		-ʔaːyik
Dative (Approach)		-ʔaːwʔan
Instrumental	-es / -kas	-aːlas/ -ʔaːkay
Conjunctive	-ʔen	-ʔaːlʔen
Vocative	(bare stem)	(bare stem)

=== Verbs ===
Verbs are bound morphemes that have a limit of only two themes, the second theme being the modifying theme and usually serving as an adverbial theme. However, if the suffix -ʔe/-wa is added the verb functions as a free theme.

==== Pronouns ====
Pronouns are not used except for emphasis on the subject and are affixed as prefixes. Person and number are usually indicated by the affixation of the verb. Most pronouns are bound themes, especially the demonstrative pronouns.

Tonkawa Personal Pronouns
	singular	plural
1st person	saː- me	kew-saː- we/us
2nd person	naː- you	we-naː- you pl./them
3rd person	ʔa- him/her	we-naː- you pl./them

==== Demonstrative pronouns ====
Demonstrative adverbs can be formed by adding -ca 'place', -l 'direction', -c 'manner' to the demonstrative pronouns below.

Example: waː 'that one aforementioned' + ca 'place = 'waː-ca 'that place aforementioned'

Interrogative pronouns can be formed by adding the prefix he- to the demonstrative pronouns as well by using the same format for the demonstrative adverbs.

Example: he 'interrogative' + teː 'this' + l 'direction' = he-teː-l 'where'

Indefinite pronouns can also be formed with affixation. (Interrogative + ʔax)

Example: hecuː 'what' + ʔax = hecuː-ʔax 'anything, something, anyone, someone'

Tonkawa Demonstrative	English Demonstrative
waː-	the one aforementioned
teː-	this
heʔe/ heʔeː/ heː	that
weː	(that) one yonder

Also within the verbal-prefix category are the causatives ya- and nec-, where ya- is the older form.

==== Verb suffixes ====
Verb suffixes are important in Tonkawa because they usually indicate the tense, negativity, and manner (outside of what is conveyed in the aforementioned prefixes) of the action performed.

Suffix	Function	Placement
-ape/-ap	Negation suffix	follows the theme but follows a second-person plural object pronoun, if present
-nesʔe/ -nesʔ	Dual subject suffix	follows the negation suffix, future tense suffix, and second-person plural object pronoun
-wesʔe/ -weʔ	Plural subject suffix	same position as the dual subject; occurs in the first and second persons in all modes
-aːtew/ -aːto	Future tense suffix	after the stem/theme (present tense: -ʔe or just -ʔ; past tense: -ʔej or -ʔeːje)
-no/ -n	Continuative suffix	after the stem
-we/ -oː/ -o	declarative mode suffix	after the present or past tense
-kʷa	Exclamatory suffix	after the 3rd person singular or at the end of the word
-w	Imperative mode	only in the singular, dual, or second-person plural

=== Enclitics ===
Enclitics are bound morphemes that are suffixed to verbs, nouns, and demonstratives that end with -k. Enclitics often express modal concepts in Tonkawa, which occur in the declarative, interrogative, and quotative/narrative clauses or statements.

Clause	Suffix	Special Circumstances
Declarative	-aw or -aːwe	
Interrogative	-je or -jelkʷa	both take the ʔ suffix unless there is an interrogative pronoun
Quotative/ Narrative	-noʔo/ -laknoʔo	only added to verb forms with –k suffix and if the verb is used in telling a mythical story

== Lexicon ==
Vocabulary

English	Tonkawa
One	We:'ispax
Two	Ketay
Three	Metis
Four	Sikit
Five	Kaskwa
Man	Ha:'ako:n
Woman	Kwa:nla
Dog	'Ekwan
Sun	Taxas
Water	A:x

=== Sample text ===
The following text is the first four sentences of Coyote and Jackrabbit, from Hoijer's Tonkawa Texts.

ha·csokonayla ha·nanoklaknoˀo xamˀalˀa·yˀik. ˀe·kʷa tanmaslakʷa·low hecne·laklaknoˀo lak. ha·csokonayla "ˀo·c!" noklaknoˀo. "ˀekʷanesxaw sa·ken nenxales!" noklaknoˀo. ˀe·ta tanmaslakʷa·lowa·ˀa·lak hewleklaknoˀo.

Gloss:

Coyote / he was going along, S / on the prairie. When he did so / Jackrabbit / he was lying, S / (accus.). Coyote / "Oho!" / he said, S. "Horse /my / I have found it!" / he said, S. And then / that Jackrabbit afm / he caught him, S.

In this gloss, S is an abbreviation for "it is said", and afm for "the aforementioned".

== Sources ==
- Gatschet, Albert Samuel (1876). Zwölf Sprachen aus dem südwesten Nordamerikas (Pueblos- und Apache-mundarten; Tonto, Tonkawa, Digger, Utah.) (in German). Weimar, Germany: H. Bohlau.
- Hoijer, Harry (1933). "Tonkawa: An Indian language of Texas". In Boaz, Frank (ed.). Handbook of American Indian languages. Vol. 3. New York: Columbia University. pp. 1–148.
- Hoijer, Harry (1946). "Tonkawa". In Osgood, Cornelius (ed.). Linguistic Structures of Native America. Viking Fund Publications in Anthropology. Vol. 6. New York: Johnson Reprint Corp. pp. 289–311.
- Hoijer, Harry (1949). An Analytical Dictionary of the Tonkawa Language. University of California Publications in Linguistics. Vol. 5. Berkeley, CA: University of California Press. OCLC 4754061.
- Hoijer, Harry (1972). Tonkawa texts. University of California publications in linguistics. Vol. 73. Berkeley: University of California. ISBN 978-0-520-09451-2.
- Kisseberth, Charles (1970). "Vowel Elision in Tonkawa and Derivational Constraints". In Sadock, J. L.; Vanek, A. L. (eds.). Studies Presentend to Robert B. Lees by his students. Champaign, IL: Linguistic Research. pp. 109–137. OCLC 139314.
- Mithun, Marianne (1999). The Languages of Native North America. Cambridge: Cambridge University Press. ISBN 0-521-23228-7.
- Noske, Roland (1993). A Theory of Syllabification and Segmental Alternation. With studies on the phonology of French, German, Tonkawa and Yawelmani. Tübingen: Niemeyer. doi:10.1515/9783111594798. ISBN 978-3-484-30296-9.
- Phelps, Elaine F. (1973). Tonkawa, Sundanese and Kasem. Some problems in Generative Phonology (PhD thesis). Seattle: University of Washington.
- Phelps, Elaine F. (1975). "Iteration and Disjunctive Domains in Phonology". Linguistic Analysis. 1 (2): 137–172.
- "The Tonkawa Language: Pronunciation Key". The Tonkawa Tribe. Archived from the original on March 16, 2005.
