= Nerea Calvillo =

Spanish architect

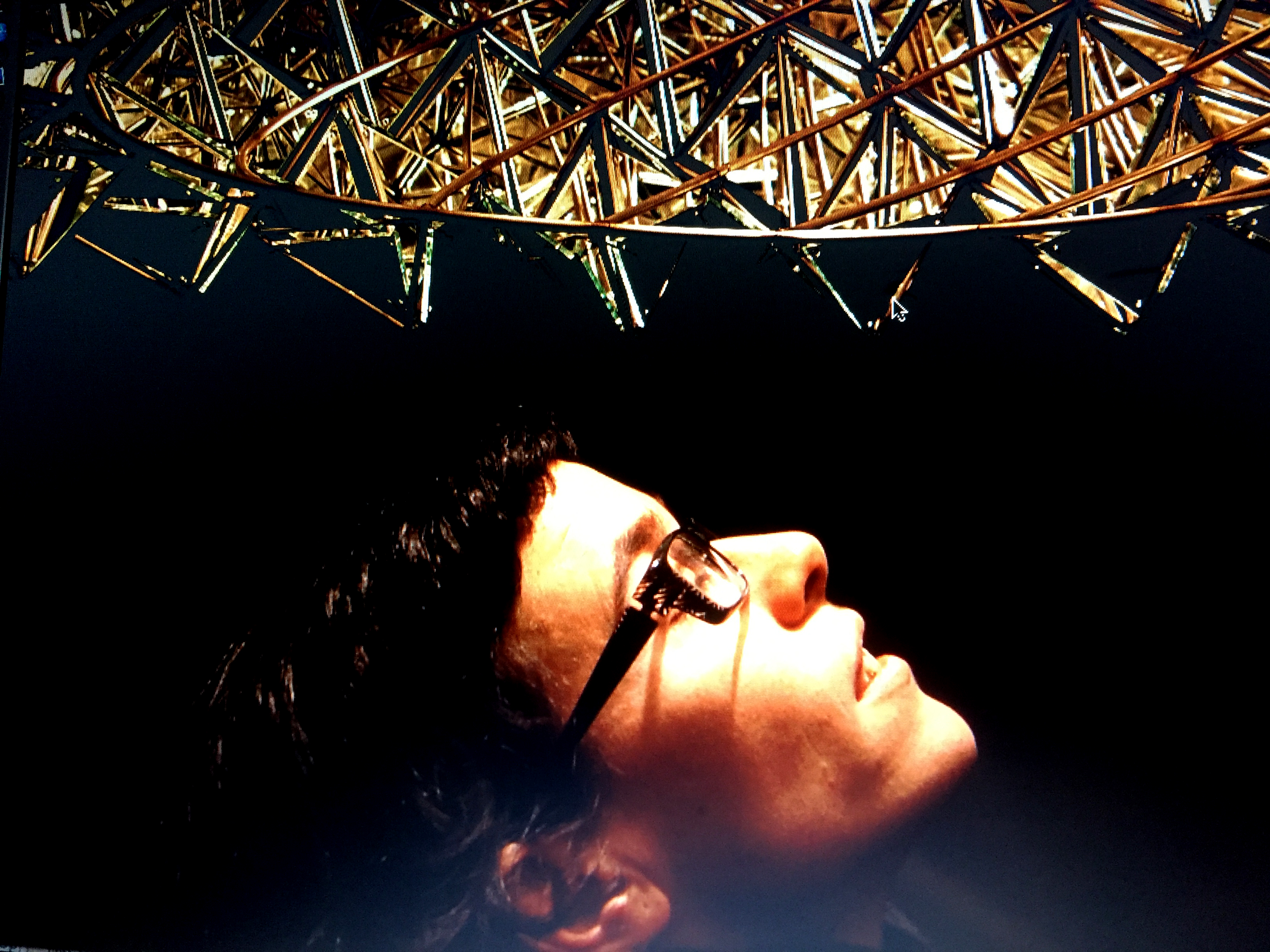
- Born: 7 March 1973 (age 53); Madrid, Spain
- Citizenship: Spanish
- Occupations: research and teacher

Academic background
- Education: Superior Technical School of Architecture of Madrid
- Thesis: Sensing Aeropolis

Nerea Calvillo (Madrid, 7 March 1973) is a Spanish architect and researcher who investigates the intersection between architecture, science and technology, as well as feminist studies, new materials and urban political ecology. Specialized in the research of the visual representation of air in the atmosphere, she constructs graphic diagrams for the visualization of invisible microscopic agents in the air and thus influences the improvement of air quality. This project is called "In the Air". In 2023, Columbia university published the essay Aeropolis, Queering Air in Toxixpolluted Worlds.

== Education ==
She studied architecture at the Superior Technical School of Architecture of Madrid (ETSAM), where she received her PhD in 2014 with outstanding cum laude with the thesis "Sensing Aeropolis". She obtained the Poiesis Fellowship from New York University. With the Fulbright scholarship, she studied in New York, graduating from the Master of Science in Advanced Architectural Design, MSAAD, at Columbia University in New York.

She continued her research in the air quality data with a Fellowship at the Goldsmiths University of London.

== Professional development ==
She created the C+arquitectos studio in 2004 in Spain, after working in several international architectural firms such as NO.MAD Madrid, and F.O.A., London.

Making extensive use of new technologies as usual work tools, C+arquitectos has been responsible for the design of numerous spaces for the exhibition of contemporary art such is the case of the Laboral Center of Art in Gijón, the Museum of Contemporary Art in Santiago de Chile, the Tabacalera Principal of the Ministry of Culture in Madrid or various headquarters of the Cervantes Institute (Spain, Serbia, etc).

Likewise, her architecture projects have earned her the recognition of awards such as the EUROPAN, or having been part of the selection of emerging practices of FreshMadrid in 2007.

The year 2012 in Madrid, she was an expert speaker presenting a conference in the annual international platform of knowledge TED xMadrid "El aire de Madrid".

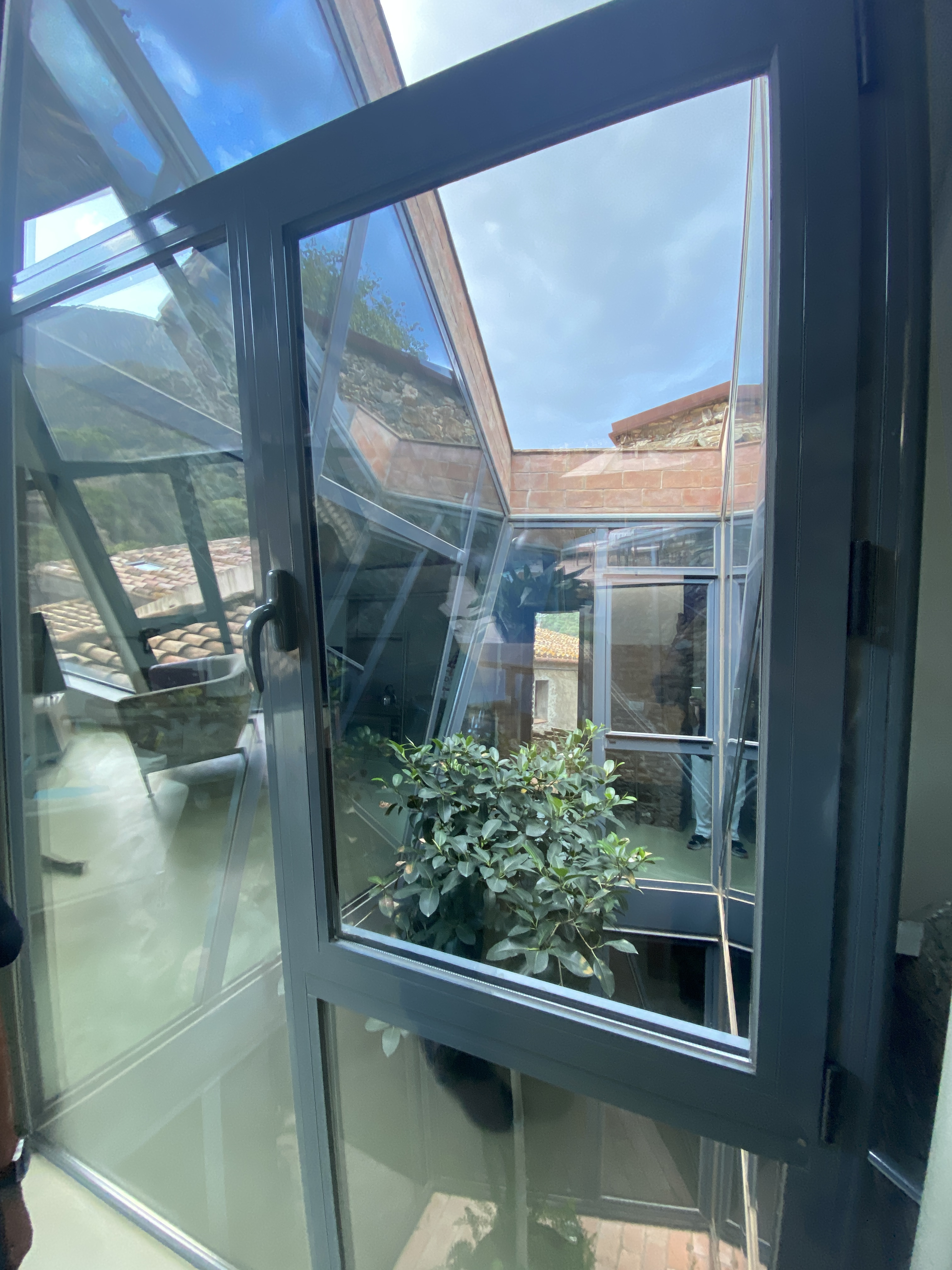
Hause periscope in Gerona, Spain

In 2013 C+arquitectos was selected for FRESHLATINO 2, a selection of Ibero-American architecture offices curated by the architects Ariadna Cantís and Andrés Jaque, presenting the exhibition of the works at the Instituto Cervantes in Madrid. Since 2013 she works as a researcher in the research project funded by ESRC Citizen Sense in the sociology department of Goldsmiths University of London.

She has worked teaching in urbanNext: expanding architecture to rethink cities at the University of Alicante from 2010 to 2014, and at the Universidad Europea de Madrid. She also has been invited to teach at the Graduate School of Design at Harvard University, and Columbia University, New York, several years.

Since 2014 she teaches as an assistant professor at the Center for Interdisciplinary Methodologies Social Sciences University of Warwick United Kingdom and at the architectural school AA London.

She has been director of the line of work dedicated to urban screens Media (nera) Lab in Medialab-Prado in Madrid and co-curator of Media Facades Festival Europe in 2010, and also the European project Facades Connecting Cities 2007-2013. Connecting Cities is a network of European institutions that proposes the use of digital facades and large screens for the circulation and exchange of cultural and artistic contents in the European Community.

In 2017 she was invited to participate at the I Seoul Biennale of Architecture and Urbanism in Korea with the project "Yellow Dust" produced with the help of Acción Cultural Española ACE and an ESRC IAA scholarship from the University of Warwick and the Economic and Social Research Council (United Kingdom).

In the T Magazine Spain of the New York Times, Nerea Calvillo is one of the "Influential 17. Who is in charge here, those who have marked the interior design, architecture and lifestyle of 2017. Stay with them."

Guest editor of the Special Issue Toxic Politics in the Social Studies of Science - Volume 48, issue 3, June 2018.

In 2018, at the magazine from El País Retina,/2#, was published an article under the title "Nerea Calvillo, La mujer que juega con el viento", a cry for climate change and air quality.

In the year 2019, she showed her work at Matadero Madrid in the second edition Tentacular, Festival de Tecnologías Críticas y Aventuras Digitales.

In november 2019, again in El Pais, was publish a video - interview under the title "La mujer que convierte la contaminación en una obra de arte"

In november from the same year 2019, she participates and presents her work in the international exhibition Eco-Visionaries at the Royal Academy de Londres.

The year 2021, she participated at the Shanghai Bienalle, China, curated by Andres Jaque, with the title, bodies of Water.

== Teaching ==
Calvillo is an associate professor at the Centre for Interdisciplinary Methodologies, University of Warwick, Great Britain; and an adjunct associate professor at Columbia University’s Graduate School of Architecture, Planning, and Preservation.

== Award ==
IN 2024 she got the DigitalFUTURES Spanish Award.
