= Senecú, Chihuahua =

Coordinates: 31°42′25″N 106°24′11″W

Senecú (Senecú del Sur, San Antonio de Senecú) is a small Mexican village on the outskirts of Ciudad Juárez, Chihuahua. It is at an altitude of 1,123 m. and lies within the Chihuahuan Desert ecosystem.

Senecú del Sur was founded in 1682 by Piro Indians from Senecú, New Mexico, who fled south along with the Spanish after the Pueblo Revolt. There is evidence that some Tompiro joined the pueblo. Originally it was located on the north side of the Rio Grande, with its mission church (located approximately two miles west-northwest of the Ysleta, Texas mission. This close proximity resulted in repeated disputes over the boundary between the two pueblos. In 1832 there was severe flooding and due to the meanderings of the Rio Grande much of the village was destroyed. Further losses to the river occurred and after the Senecú Pueblo was not recognized by the Texas legislature, and after they had lost their suit of 1871 to Ysleta, the inhabitants probably developed the same land which was now south of the river; however, the town was not formally established at its current location until 1949.

As of 1901, Senecú still had "a tribal organization, with a cacique (who is also custodian of the church), a governor, a war-chief, and subordinate officials." The old church identified in 1901 is gone, replaced by a modern church. The 1910 Mexican Revolution caused some members of the community to flee across the border to Ysleta and Socorro del Sur.

The Pueblo is commemorated by a stone monument on Alameda Street, in El Paso, about 1½ miles west of the Ysleta Mission.
