= Missions in Spanish Louisiana =

18th-century Catholic religious outposts

The missions in Spanish Louisiana were religious outposts in Spanish Louisiana (La Luisiana) region of the Viceroyalty of New Spain, located within the present-day U.S. states of Louisiana and East Texas.

They were established by Spanish missionaries for Indian Reductions of the local Native Americans.

== Missions ==
Missions in Spanish Louisiana
Name	Image	Location	Established	Notes	References
Nuestra Señora de los Dolores de los Ais		_{31.52356, -94.1151}	1716	Re-established in 1721 on Ayish Bayou. Missionaries continued their work until 1773 when the East Texas missions were once again closed. Archeologists confirmed the location of the mission in the late 1970s. Since July 1, 2016, the Texas Historical Commission has operated the site as Mission Dolores State Historic Site.	
San Miguel de Linares de los Adaes			Early 1717	The mission was attacked by French soldiers in 1719 and was abandoned. Moved and renamed San Miguel de Cuellar de Linares de los Adaes.	
San Miguel de Cuéllar de Linares de los Adaes		Los Adaes	1722	Originally San Miguel de Linares de los Adaes. The Marquis de San Miguel de Aguayo, Governor of Coahuila and Tejas when they were part of the Viceroyalty of New Spain, reopened the mission, but at a location closer to the Presidio of Los Adaes. The mission remained open until 1773.	
Las Cabezas		On Bayou Scie	Around 1795	Succeeded by Nuestra Senora de Guadalupe, and in 1858 was referred to as San Miguel. The St. Joseph Catholic Church in Zwolle proceeds these.	

== See also ==
On Spanish Missions in neighboring regions:

- Spanish missions in Florida
- List of missions in Spanish Florida
- Spanish missions in Georgia
- Spanish missions in Texas

On general missionary history:

- Catholic Church and the Age of Discovery

On colonial Spanish American history:

- Louisiana (New Spain)
- Louisiana (New France)
- Spanish Texas
- Spanish colonization of the Americas
