= College of Santa Cruz de Querétaro =

Former Franciscan college

The College of Santa Cruz de Querétaro was a Franciscan missionary college, or seminary, in New Spain. It was located in present-day Querétaro, Querétaro, Mexico, and was the second Roman Catholic missionary college in the New World to train missionaries.

The school was founded in 1683 by Antonio Llinás. Another of its founders was Damián Massanet. It accepted both Spanish and Mexican-born applicants; traveling expenses for Spanish students were paid by the crown, in return for ten years of service.

Of the school's thirteen charter members, nine would later serve in Spanish Texas.

== See also ==
- College of Guadalupe de Zacatecas
- College of San Fernando de Mexico
- Franciscan Missions in the Sierra Gorda
- Spanish missions in Texas
