= Nabedache =

The Nabedache were a Native American tribe from eastern Texas. Their name, Nabáydácu, means "blackberry place" in the Caddo language. An alternate theory says their original name was Wawadishe from the Caddo word, witish, meaning "salt."

== History ==
The Nabedache was the western branch of the Hasinai branch of the Caddo Confederacy. Their traditional territory was located between the Neches and Trinity Rivers.

In 1686, French explorer, Henri Joutel, encountered the tribe living at the headwaters of the Neches River, near present-day Houston County, Texas. In 1690 Spanish Francisco monks accompanying explorer Domingo Ramon founded a mission, San Francisco de los Tejas Mission in Nabedache territory. European contact brought devastating diseases, and the Nabedache suffered an epidemic in 1690-91. In the ensuing century, their principal village, was 12–15 miles west of the Neches River. The village was called San Pedro for the nearby Arroyo San Pedro.

Spanish chroniclers observed that women, as well as men, could be priests and hold high ranks. In the late 18th century, polyandry was also observed.

The tribe moved further up the Neches between 1779 and 1784. Ultimately, they were forced to relocate to the Wichita Reservation in Indian Territory in the 19th century. Today they are enrolled in the Caddo Nation of Oklahoma.

== Synonymy ==
The tribe is also known as the Nabadacho, Nabaydacho, Nabordakhes, Inecis, Ynecis, Navedacho, and Naoudiche.
