= María del Carmen Calvillo =

Ana María del Carmen Calvillo
- Born: July 9, 1765; San Antonio de Bexar
- Died: January 15, 1856 (aged 90)
- Occupation: Rancher

Doña Ana María del Carmen Calvillo (July 9, 1765 – January 15, 1856) was a rancher in Spanish Texas. She owned the Rancho de las Cabras in present-day San Antonio which is now part of the San Antonio Missions National Historical Park (SAAN).

== Biography ==
Calvillo was born in San Antonio de Bexar in 1765. She was the oldest of six children. Calvillo defied the customs of her time and was said to have "rode the range like a man". Her grandnephew recalled that she "dressed like a man and could shoot and rope like one".

Calvillo married Juan Lucas Gavino de la Trinidad Delgado in Bexar County sometime around 1781. She kept her maiden name and individually maintained her property under Spanish Law. They had two sons, one baptized in 1783, and another the next year; the youngest son died when he was seven months old. She and her husband also adopted three children. The census showed her and her husband living as ranchers in Villa de San Fernando and, in 1811, they were living on her father's ranch.

Between 1811 and 1814, her husband, Gavino, was involved with overthrowing Spanish rule and sometime during these years, Calvillo left him. In April 1814, Calvillo's father was murdered, and she inherited the ranch known as Rancho de las Cabras (the Goat Ranch). She ran the ranch herself and expanded it to include a granary, a sugar mill and an irrigation system. She owned around 2,000 head of cattle, and had a shepherd, a tailor, eight laborers a personal servant and all of their families living and working on her land.

Calvillo didn't formally petition the Mexican government for the title to the ranch until August 28, 1828, which was granted to her in September of the same year. She was later granted three additional leagues of land in 1833. Also in 1833, she had trouble with Indians on her land. She finally had a representative in court in 1851, where she was declared by the court as non compos mentis.

Calvillo died on January 15, 1856. She left the ranch to her adopted daughter and son. People in the area tell stories about her returning as a ghost, riding a white horse across the area around the Rancho de las Cabras.
