= Nacono =

The Nacono were a Native American tribe from eastern Texas. Today they are part of the Caddo Nation of Oklahoma, a federally recognized tribe in Oklahoma.

== History ==
The Nacono were part of the Hasinai branch of the Caddo Confederacy. They historically lived in villages along the Neches and Angelina Rivers, near present-day Cherokee and Houston counties. Their environment includes mixed woodlands and savannas.

Early 18th century Spanish explorer Domingo Ramon recorded his observations of the Nocono in his 1716 Diary. He observed that the tribe lived near the San Francisco de los Neches Mission. Another Spanish explorer, Juan Antonio de la Pena wrote in 1721 that the Nacono village, that he called El Macono, was located five leagues below the Neches crossing. Together with 11 to 30 historical communities, including the Nadaco, the Hainai, and the Nacogdoche, the Nacono formed the Hasinai confederacy, which evolved into the greater Caddo confederacy. These confederacies are thought to have formed due to upheavals, depopulation, and migrations caused by European diseases and increased conflicts in the region in the 17th century.

== Names ==
The tribe is also known as the Naconish, Macono, Naconome, and Nocono. The Lacane, Nacachau, Nacao (Nacau), Naconicho (Nacaniche), and Nakanawan peoples might have been divisions of the Nacono tribe.
