= Hasinai =

Indigenous southeastern Texas tribe

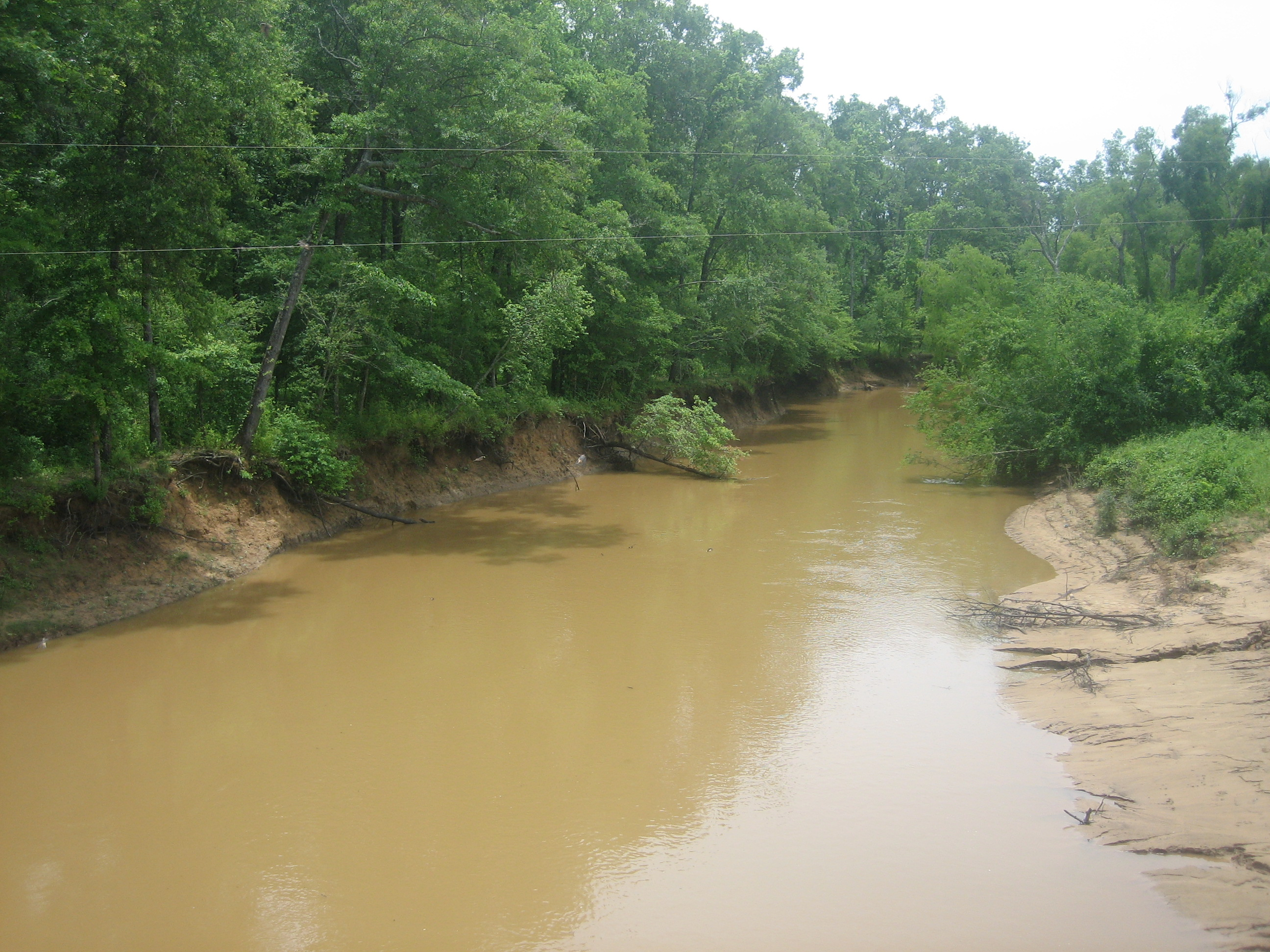
- Angelina River, west of Nacogdoches, Texas, ancestral Hasinai homeland

Total population
- under 5,757

Regions with significant populations
- formerly Louisiana, Texas, currently Oklahoma

Languages
- Hasinai, English

Religion
- Native American Church, Christianity

Related ethnic groups
- Hainai, Nabedache, Nabiti, Nacogdoche, Nacono, Nadaco, Nasoni (Lower), Nechaui, Neche, and other Caddo people

The Hasinai Confederacy (Caddo: Hasíinay) was a large confederation of Caddo-speaking Native Americans who occupied territory between the Sabine and Trinity rivers in eastern Texas. Today, their descendants are enrolled in the Caddo Nation of Oklahoma.

== Name ==
The name Hasinai means "our own people" in Caddoan. The Spanish knew the Hasinai as the Tejas or Texas, from a form of greeting meaning "friend", which gave the state of Texas its name.

Variants of Hasinai include: Hasini, Asenai, Asinai, Assoni, Asenay, Cenis, Senis, Sannaye, Asinaiz, Asinayes, Assinais, Azinais, Azinays.

== Government ==
When the Spanish and the French encountered the Hasinai in the 1680s, they were a centrally organized chiefdom under the control of a religious leader, known as the Grand Xinesi. He lived in a secluded house and met with a council of elders.

The chieftainship consisted of several subdivisions, which have been designated "cantonments". Each was under the control of a Caddi. There were also men designated as Canahas and Chayas, who helped the Caddi run the system.

== History ==
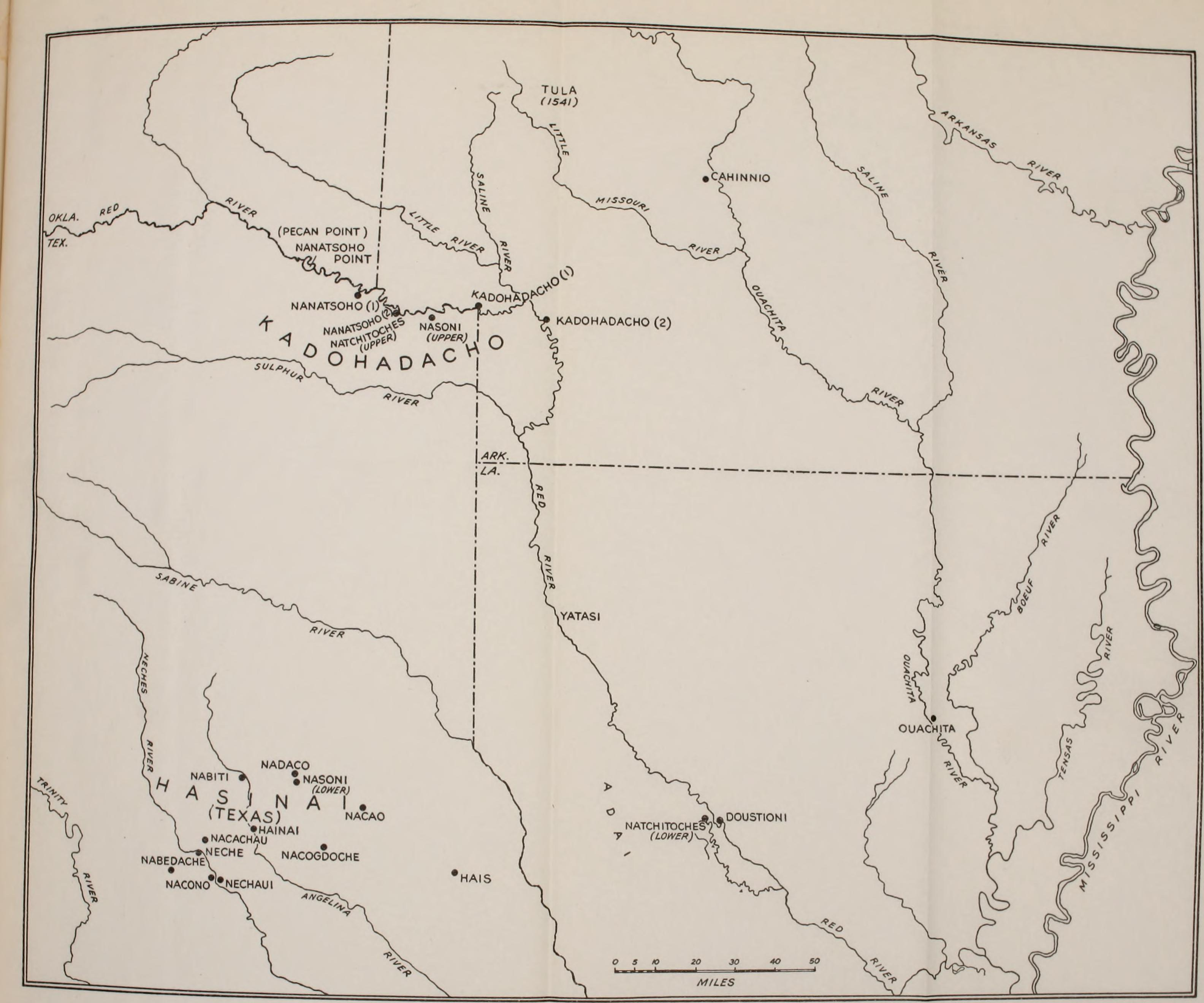
The historic domain of the Hasinai and other Caddo tribes

During the 17th century, the Hasinai traded with the Jumano at the western Hasinai city of Nabedache. Some consider the residents of Nabedache to have been a distinct people designated by that name.

== Historic populations ==
It is estimated that in 1520, the people who would become the Hasinai, the Kadohadacho and the Natchitoches, numbered about 250,000. Over the next 250 years, the population of these Caddoan-speaking peoples was severely reduced by epidemics of endemic diseases carried by Spanish and French colonists and spread through indigenous trading networks. Native Americans had no acquired immunity to the new diseases, and suffered high mortality.

In 1690, the Hasinai numbered in the vicinity of 10,000 people or a little more. By 1720, as a result of infectious diseases such as smallpox, the Hasinai population had fallen to 2,000.

== See also ==
- Caddoan Mississippian culture
- Caddo
- Caddo language
- El Camino Real de los Tejas National Historic Trail
