= Spanish missions in Texas =

17th to 19th-century Catholic religious outposts

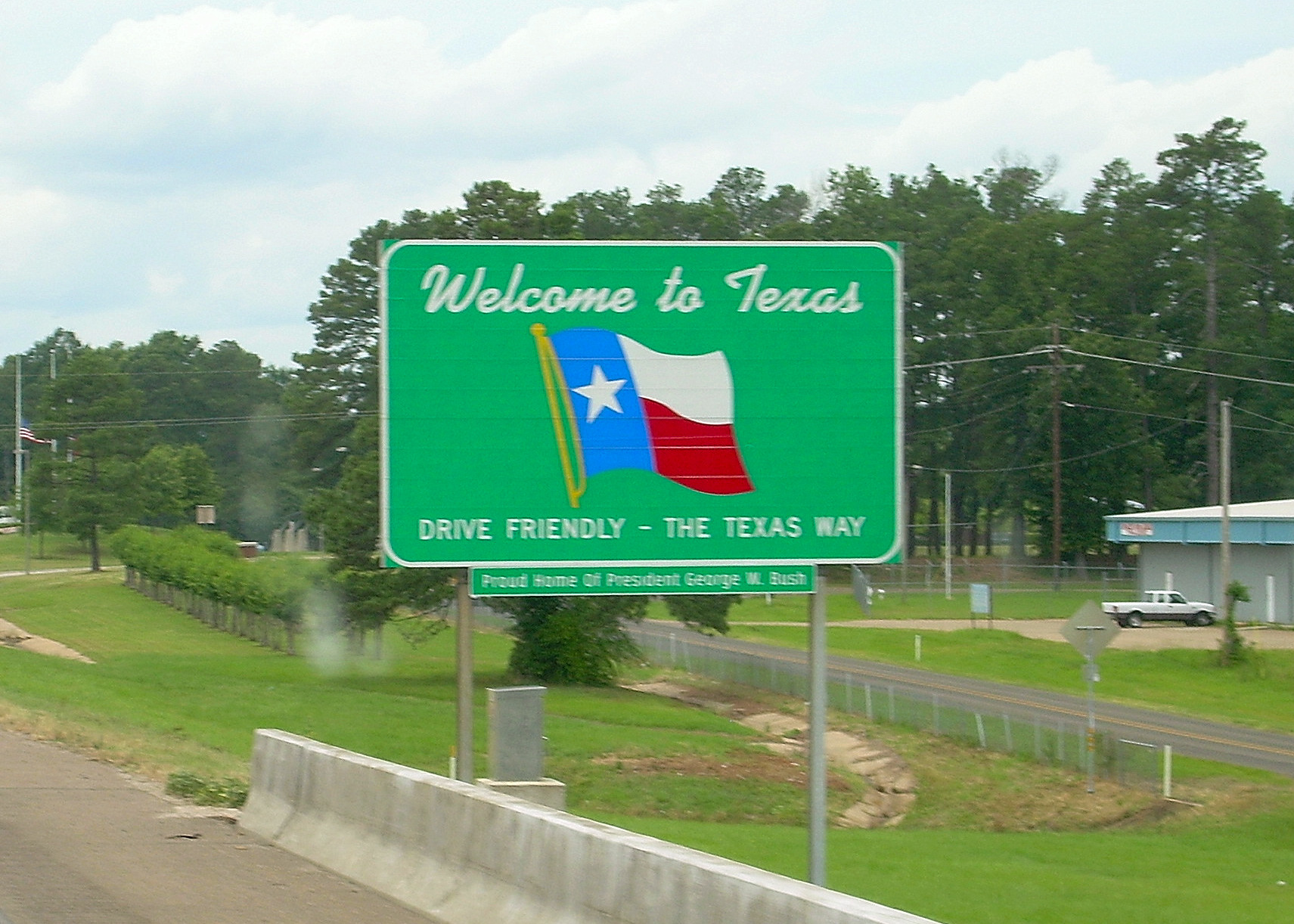
Spanish missions within the boundaries of what is now the U.S. state of Texas

The Spanish Missions in Texas comprise the many Catholic outposts established in New Spain by Dominican, Jesuit, and Franciscan orders to spread their doctrine among Native Americans and to give Spain a toehold in the frontier land. The missions introduced European livestock, fruits, vegetables, and industry into the Texas area. In addition to the presidio (fortified church) and pueblo (town), the misión was one of the three major agencies employed by the Spanish crown to extend its borders and consolidate its colonial territories.

Since 1493, Spain had maintained missions throughout New Spain (Mexico and portions of what today are the southwestern United States) to facilitate colonization. The eastern Tejas missions were a direct response to fear of French encroachment when the remains of La Salle's Fort Saint Louis were discovered near Matagorda Bay in 1689, and a response to the first permanent French outposts along the Gulf Coast ten years later.

Following government policy, Franciscan missionaries sought to make life within mission communities closely resemble that of Spanish villages and Spanish culture. To become Spanish citizens and "productive" inhabitants, Native Americans learned vocational skills, such as plows, farm implements, and gear for horses, oxen, and mules fell into disrepair, blacksmithing skills soon became indispensable. Weaving skills were needed to help clothe the inhabitants. As buildings became more elaborate, mission occupants learned masonry and carpentry under the direction of craftsmen contracted by the missionaries.

In the closely supervised setting of the mission the Native Americans were expected to mature in Christianity and Spanish political and economic practices until they would no longer require special mission status. Then their communities could be incorporated as such into ordinary colonial society. This transition from official mission status to ordinary Spanish society, when it occurred in an official manner, was called "secularization." In this official transaction, the mission's communal properties were privatized, the direction of civil life became a purely secular affair, and the direction of church life was transferred from the missionary religious orders to the Catholic diocesan church. Although colonial law specified no precise time for this transition to take effect, increasing pressure for the secularization of most missions developed in the last decades of the 18th century.

This mission system was developed in response to the often very detrimental results of leaving the Hispanic control of relations with Native Americans on the expanding frontier to overly enterprising civilians and soldiers. This had resulted too often in the abuse and even enslavement of the Indians and a heightening of antagonism.

A church called Santa María de las Caldas was built by the Franciscans in 1730, after the establishment of Texas's final mission, Nuestra Señora del Refugio. It was located in Socorro and remained active until its closure in 1749. It is not formally counted as a mission.

In the end, the mission system was not politically strong enough to protect the Native Americans against the growing power of ranchers and other business interests that sought control over mission lands and the manpower represented by the Native Americans. In the first few years of the new Republic of Mexico—between 1824 and 1830—all the missions still operating in Texas were officially secularized, with the sole exception of those in the El Paso district, which were turned over to diocesan pastors only in 1852.

== Missions ==
Name	Image	Location	Established	Notes	References
Corpus Christi de (San Antonio de) la Isleta/Ysleta (Sur)		_{31.69101, -106.32739}	1682	The first mission in Texas. Flooding destroyed the mission in both 1742 and 1829. The present church was constructed in 1851 on higher ground. In 1881, the Jesuits took control and renamed it Mission de Nuestra Señora del Monte Carmelo. In 1980, the name was changed to Mission San Antonio de los Tiguas. The church is still in use today.	
Nuestra Señora de la Limpia Concepción de Los Piros/del Pueblo de/del Socorro (del Sur)		_{31.65933, -106.30347}	1682	The present mission church at Socorro was built after the 1829 flood, around 1840.	
San Antonio de Senecú/Senecú del Sur			1682	Established in the spring of 1682 after the Pueblo Revolt. In 1683 Senecú may have been moved. In 1949 a community called Senecú was located in Mexico.	
(La) Navidad de las Cruces			December 29, 1683	The Mendoza-Lopez expedition party camped at a village. They named it Navidad de las Cruces and founded a mission.	
El Apostle Santiago		Near Presidio	January 1, 1684	The Mendoza-Lopez expedition, after establishing La Navidad de las Cruces, entered another village. They named it El Apostle Santiago and founded a mission.	
San Clemente		31.55981, -99.73483	March 16, 1684	It was a temporary mission established by Juan Domínguez de Mendoza. It lasted until May 1, 1684.	
San Francisco de los Tejas		Near Weches	1690	Abandoned in 1693 due to local resistance, disease, and resource challenges. It was re-established as the missions Nuestro Padre San Francisco de los Tejas, San Francisco de los In 1730 it was moved to the Colorado River near what is now Zilker Park with missions San Francisco de los Tejas and Nuestra Señora de la Purísima Concepción de los Hainai, and finally San Francisco de la Espada.	
(El) Santísimo Nombre de María		Near Alto	September 1690	The mission consisted of a straw chapel and a house for the priest. It was destroyed by a flood in 1692.	
Señor San José		Near Presidio	1715	Driven out of the mission by natives in 1726. After this, the mission was only run occasionally.	
San Antonio de Padua		Near Presidio	1715	Located southeast of Señor San José. It was renamed as San Antonio de Los Puliques and may have at one point been located near Redford.	
San Cristóbal		Near Presidio	1715	Active until 1726. After this, the mission was only run occasionally. In operation until at least 1760 when Presidio del Norte de la Junta de Los Rios was founded.	
Mission of the Cibolas		Shafter	1715	Located 24 miles northwest of Presidio.	
Mission at Redford		Redford			
San Francisco de los Julimes					
Nuestro Padre San Francisco de los Tejas		Near the west bank of the Neches River	July 3, 1716	Abandoned in 1719. Re-established and moved in 1721 as San Francisco de los Neches.	
Nuestra Señora de la Purísima Concepción de los Hainai			July 7, 1716	This mission was originally established on the Angelina River in 1716. It served the Hainai tribe. It was closed because of the French threat and reopened in 1721. In 1730 it was moved to the Colorado River near Zilker Park with missions San Francisco de los Tejas and San José de los Nazonis. It moved to San Antonio in 1731, where it was renamed Mission Nuestra Señora de la Purísima Concepción de Acuña.	
Nuestra Señora de Guadalupe de los Nacogdoches		Nacogdoches	July 9, 1716	Established by the Domingo Ramón-St. Denis expedition to serve the Nacogdoche tribe. It closed several years later because of threats from French Louisiana but reopened in 1721. The mission continued until 1773, when the Spanish government ordered all of East Texas to be abandoned. In 1779, Antonio Gil Y'Barbo led a group of settlers who had been removed from Los Adaes to the area to settle in the empty mission buildings. This began the town of Nacogdoches, Texas.	
San José de los Nazonis		Near Cushing	July 11, 1716	Abandoned in 1719 after the French took the presidio at Los Adaes and reactivated in 1721. In 1730 it was moved to the Colorado River near Zilker Park with missions San Francisco de los Tejas and Nuestra Señora de la Purísima Concepción de los Hainai. The mission is usually believed to have moved in 1731 to become Mission San Juan Capistrano and renamed so as not to cause confusion with Mission San José y San Miguel de Aguayo.	
Nuestra Señora (de los) Dolores de los Ais		_{31.52356, -94.1151}	1716	Re-established in 1721 on Ayish Bayou. Missionaries continued their work until 1773 when the East Texas missions were once again closed. Archeologists confirmed the location of the mission in the late 1970s. Since July 1, 2016, the Texas Historical Commission has operated the site as Mission Dolores State Historic Site.	
San Antonio de Valero		_{29.42573, -98.48622}	May 1, 1718	The mission was first located west of San Pedro Springs, moving several times before finally founding the mission above a bend in the San Antonio River for easier defense. The mission served the Coahuiltecan until 1793. It was the site of the Battle of the Alamo and later stored U.S. Army supplies in the Mexican–American War.	
San José y San Miguel de Aguayo		_{29.36238, -98.47985}	February 23, 1720	Shortly after its founding, Mission San Antonio de Valero became overcrowded with refugees from the closed East Texas missions, so this mission was established. Nicknamed the "Queen of the Missions", it served the Coahuiltecan. A new church, which still stands, was constructed in 1768 from local limestone. Mission activities officially ended in 1824.	
San Francisco de los Neches		Six miles west of the present town of Alto and east of the Neches River	1721	When the Aguayo expedition reached east Texas, they re-established the missions abandoned in 1719. San Francisco de los Tejas was renamed San Francisco de los Neches. Moved to the Colorado River near Zilker Park with missions San Francisco de los Tejas and Nuestra Señora de la Purísima Concepción de los Hainai in 1730. Completely destroyed	
San Francisco Xavier de Nájera/Naxara		A little more than a league south of the Alamo, on the San Antonio River	March 12, 1722	The new mission endured until 1726, when it was merged with San Antonio de Valero. Its lands were regranted to the mission of Nuestra Señora de la Purísima Concepción de Acuña around 1731.	
Nuestra Señora del Espíritu Santo de Zúñiga (La Bahia)		_{28.65722, -97.38666}	1722	Originally established in Matagorda Bay where it was referred to as La Bahia. It moved in 1726 near Victoria and in 1748 to present-day Goliad.	
San Francisco de (la) Espada		_{29.31807, -98.45126}	1731	Moved from San Francisco de los Neches. The surviving structure is now part of San Antonio Missions National Historical Park operated by the National Park Service. A commemorative representation of Mission San Francisco de los Tejas, is located in Weches at Mission Tejas State Park.	
San Juan Capistrano		_{29.3325, -98.45542}	1731	Was originally San José de los Nazonis. It served Coahuiltecan natives. It was often raided by Apaches.	
Nuestra Señora de la Purísima Concepción de Acuña		_{29.39103, -98.49115}	1731	Originally named Nuestra Señora de la Purísima Concepción de los Hainai. The name was changed to honor the current viceroy of Mexico. The mission inherited the lands of San Francisco Xavier de Naxara. The current church building was completed in 1755.	
San Francisco Xavier de Horcasitas		_{30.69599, -97.11345} (historical marker at 30.69141, -97.11338)	May 7, 1748	The martyrdom of Father Gazibal caused the departure of the Indians and the friars. This mission was moved to the San Marcos River in 1755. Reestablished in 1762 on the San Saba River with the new name of Santa Cruz de San Saba.	
San Ildefonso		_{30.68916, -97.08778} (historical marker at 30.69007, -97.0896)	February 25, 1749	The martyrdom of Father Gazibal caused the departure of the Indians and the friars. This mission was moved to the San Marcos River in 1755. Reestablished in 1762 on the Nueces River with the new name of San Lorenzo de la Santa Cruz (del Cañon)..	
Nuestra Señora de la Candelaria		_{30.68791, -97.11943}(historical marker at 30.68741, -97.12015)	July 1749	The martyrdom of Father Gazibal caused the departure of the Indians and the friars. This mission was moved to the San Marcos River in 1755. Reestablished in 1762 on the Sabinal River with the new name of Nuestra Señora de la (Purísima Concepción) Candelaria del Cañon.	
Nuestra Señora del Rosario		_{28.64443, -97.43894} (historical marker at 28.64506, -97.43991)	November 1754	The site was virtually abandoned by 1781, reopened in 1789, abandoned again in 1804, and formally closed in 1807. The site can be visited only by appointment. There is a historical marker along the road adjacent to the site, however.	
San Francisco Xavier de los Dolores			1755	Pedro de Rábago y Terán established the mission. Located on the San Marcos River headwaters in Hays County. Its lands were transferred to Santa Cruz de San Sabá.	
Nuestra Señora de la Luz (del Orcoquisac)		_{29.83838, -94.73625}	1756	To try and disrupt French trade in the area, the presidio San Agustín de Ahumada and Nuestra Señora de la Luz in 1756 were founded. Both were abandoned in 1771.	
Nuestra Señora de Guadalupe			1756	It was closed in 1758 because of Comanche depredations and was never protected by a complementing presidio garrison.	
Santa Cruz de San Sabá/San Sabá de la Santa Cruz	The destruction of Mission Santa Cruz de San Sabá.	_{30.91643, -99.73474}	April 17, 1757	It was destroyed by 2,000 Comanche warriors and their allies in March 1758. Although the mission was gone, the neighboring Presidio San Luis de las Amarillas was still running until 1772. Although the events at the mission were well documented, its location was lost for most of the 20th century.	
San Lorenzo de la Santa Cruz (del Cañon)		Nearby or at Barksdale.	January 23, 1762	Abandoned in 1769.	
Nuestra Señora de la (Purísima Concepción) Candelaria del Cañon		10 miles south of Barksdale	February 6, 1762	Suppressed in 1766.	
Nuestra Señora del Refugio		Goff Bayou	February 4, 1793	The final mission established in Texas. Moved in June 1794 to the Rancho De Los Mosquitos and in January 1795 near Refugio. Nothing remains of these structures, which were made of mud and poles. The final site in Refugio is owned by Our Lady of Refuge Catholic Church.	

== See also ==
On Spanish Missions in neighboring regions:

- Spanish missions in Chihuahua and Coahuila
- Spanish missions in New Mexico
- Spanish missions in Louisiana

On general missionary history:

- Catholic Church and the Age of Discovery
- List of the oldest churches in Mexico

On colonial Spanish American history:

- Spanish Texas
- Spanish colonization of the Americas
- California mission clash of cultures
