= List of the oldest buildings in Texas =

This article attempts to list the oldest buildings in the state of Texas in the United States of America, including the oldest houses in Texas and any other surviving structures, including those constructed during the Spanish colonization, before independence and during the early republic. Some dates are approximate and based on architectural studies and historical records, other dates are based on dendrochronology. All entries should include citation with reference to: period architectural features; a report by an architectural historian; or dendrochronology. Sites on the list are generally from the earliest period architecture. Only buildings built prior to 1840 are suitable for inclusion on this list or the building must be the oldest of its type.

Building	Image	Location	First Built	Notes
The Alamo		San Antonio	1718	Part of the San Antonio Missions, listed as a UNESCO world heritage site. Site of the Battle of the Alamo.
Alamo Mission Long Barracks		San Antonio	c. 1724	The Alamo Chapel and Priests quarters and convent (Long Barracks) in San Antonio. In the center of the surrounding area are the remains of the "Long Barracks" which were constructed 20 years before the Chapel. Founded in 1718 and moved to present site 1724.
Mission Concepcion		San Antonio	1731	Part of the San Antonio Missions; listed as a UNESCO world heritage site.
Mission San Juan Capistrano (Texas)		south of San Antonio	1731	Spanish Mission
Espada Acequia		south of San Antonio	1731	Built by Franciscan friars in 1731 to supply irrigation water to the lands near Mission San Francisco de la Espada
San Fernando Cathedral		San Antonio	1738–1750	One of the oldest Cathedrals in the United States; the oldest Cathedral in Texas. Listed on the National Register of historic places.
Mission Espada		San Antonio	1745	Part of the San Antonio Missions; listed as a UNESCO world heritage site. Founded 1690; building current building constructed in 1745
Presidio La Bahía		Goliad	1749	The best preserved Spanish presidio in the United States.
Mission Nuestra Señora del Espíritu Santo de Zúñiga		Goliad	1749-1758	Restored early mission nearby the Presidio La Bahia.
Spanish Governor's Palace		San Antonio	1749	
Ruiz House		San Antonio	1750	
Mission San Jose		San Antonio	1768–1782	Part of the San Antonio Missions; listed as a UNESCO world heritage site.
Zambrano House		San Antonio	1780	One of the oldest residence in the city. It was built by Macario Zambrano whose most well known son, Juan Manuel, put down the 1811 Casas Revolt.
Dolores Aldrete House		San Antonio	1818	
Brown-Woodlief Log House		southwest of Washington	1824	Built by William S. Brown one of the "Old Three Hundred" and one of the oldest log houses left standing in Texas.
James Walker Log House		east of Brenham	1824	Built by James Walker one of the "Old Three Hundred" whose sons John and James Jr. fought in the Texas Revolution. One of the oldest log cabins left standing in Texas.
Magee-Love Log House		near Goodrich	1828	
Cartwright-McCrary House		west of Clodine	1830	Home of Republic of Texas legislator Jesse H. Cartwright.
Casa Ortiz		Laredo	1830	Built by Don Jose Reyes Ortiz and one of the oldest buildings in the city.
Dale-Rugeley-Sisk Home		Matagorda	1830	Home of the first Lieutenant Governor of Texas, A. C. Horton.
James Jordan (Jardine) Log House		Montgomery	1830	
Republic of the Rio Grande Capitol		Laredo	1830	One of the oldest buildings in the city and also the capitol of the short-lived Republic of the Rio Grande.
Trevino–Uribe Rancho		San Ygnacio	1830	One of the oldest buildings in San Ygnacio.
Fisher-Sargent-Gottschalk House		Matagorda	1832	Home of Samuel Rhoads Fisher, a signer of the Texas Declaration of Independence and the secretary of the Republic of Texas navy.
Sweeny-Waddy Log Cabin		East Columbia	1833	One of the oldest remaining slave cabins in the state built by John Sweeny Sr. for the Waddy family who continued living in it after they were freed.
Col. Charles DeMorse Home		Clarksville	1834	
Fanthorp Inn		Anderson	1834	At its core is a log cabin built by Englishman Henry Fanthorp. It was owned by Fanthorp descendants until it was sold to the state in 1977.
Varner-Hogg Plantation		north of West Columbia	1834	The plantation house of Columbus R. Patton, relative of several veterans of the Texas Revolution and later of former Governor Jim Hogg whose family struck oil on the property in 1920. It is currently a Texas State Historic Site.
Winedale Stagecoach Inn		west of Round Top	1834	
Ammon Underwood House		East Columbia	1835	At its core is an 1835 log cabin.
Burch-Cauble House		north of Chester	1835	Built by Peter Cauble and enlarged by his son-in-law and Battle of San Jacinto veteran Valentine Burch.
Cos House		San Antonio	1835	
Durst-Taylor House		Nacogdoches	1835	Built by the alcalde of Nacogdoches Joseph Durst.
Abram Alley Log Cabin		Columbus	1836	Oldest house in Columbus
Hutchinson-Korth Home		southwest of Washington	1836	
Jenkins House		Bastrop	1836	Home of Sarah Jenkins whose second husband died at the Battle of the Alamo.
Old Cavitt House		Wheelock	1836	
Thomas Barnett House		northwest of Rosenberg	1836	Home of Thomas Barnett the former mayor of Austin, member of the Consultation, and signer of the Texas Declaration of Independence.
Campbell Taylor and Greenleaf Fisk House		Bastrop	1836-1837	Home to three Mina Volunteers from the Texas Revolution: Greenleaf Fisk, Campbell Taylor, and Jesse Holderman. The latter two fought at the Battle of San Jacinto.
Millard-Lee House		Nacogdoches	1837	
San Felipe Church		San Felipe	1837	It served as a town hall, school, Masonic hall, and continues to serve as a Methodist church.
Anderson House		San Augustine	1838	
Columbus Cartwright House		San Augustine	1838	
Michel B. Menard House		Galveston	1838	The home of Galveston's founder, Michel B. Menard, and the oldest surviving building in the city.
Samuel May Williams House		Galveston	1838	Home of one of Galveston's early settlers, Samuel May Williams, and the second oldest house in the city.
Stephen W. Blount House		San Augustine	1838	Home of a signer of the Texas Declaration of Independence and a soldier during the Texas Revolution.
Swedish Log Cabin		Austin	1838	Originally built on Govalle Ranch owned by S. M. Swenson and later moved to the Zilker Botanical Gardens in Austin.
Townsend-Bremer House		south of Warrenton	1838	
Bridges House		Roganville	1838-1840	
Ezekiel Cullen House		San Augustine	1839	Home of Ezekiel Cullen a soldier of the Texas Revolution and Republic of Texas legislator.
Matthew Cartwright House		San Augustine	1839	Home of Matthew Cartwright, a Texas Revolution soldier and prosperous businessman.
Presbyterian Manse		Jefferson	1839	Oldest building in Jefferson
French Legation, Texas		Austin	1841	Oldest building in Austin on its original site; Built to represent the French government in the new Republic of Texas
Hord Log Cabin		Dallas	1845	Oldest building in Dallas
Kellum-Noble House		Houston	1847	Oldest building in Houston

== See also ==
- National Register of Historic Places listings in Texas
- Spanish missions in Texas
- Oldest buildings in the United States
