= Acequia (disambiguation) =

An acequia is a community-operated watercourse used for irrigation in Spain and former Spanish colonies.

Acequia may also refer to:

- Acequia, Colorado, an unincorporated community
- Acequia, Idaho, a city
- Acequia Park, a park in San Antonio, Texas

== See also ==
- Acequia Madre (disambiguation)
  - Acequia Madre de Valero (San Antonio), an irrigation canal built by the Payaya people at the direction of the Franciscan priests
