= Mission San José (Texas) =

Spanish mission in San Antonio, Texas

Mission San José y San Miguel de Aguayo
- "Queen of the Missions"
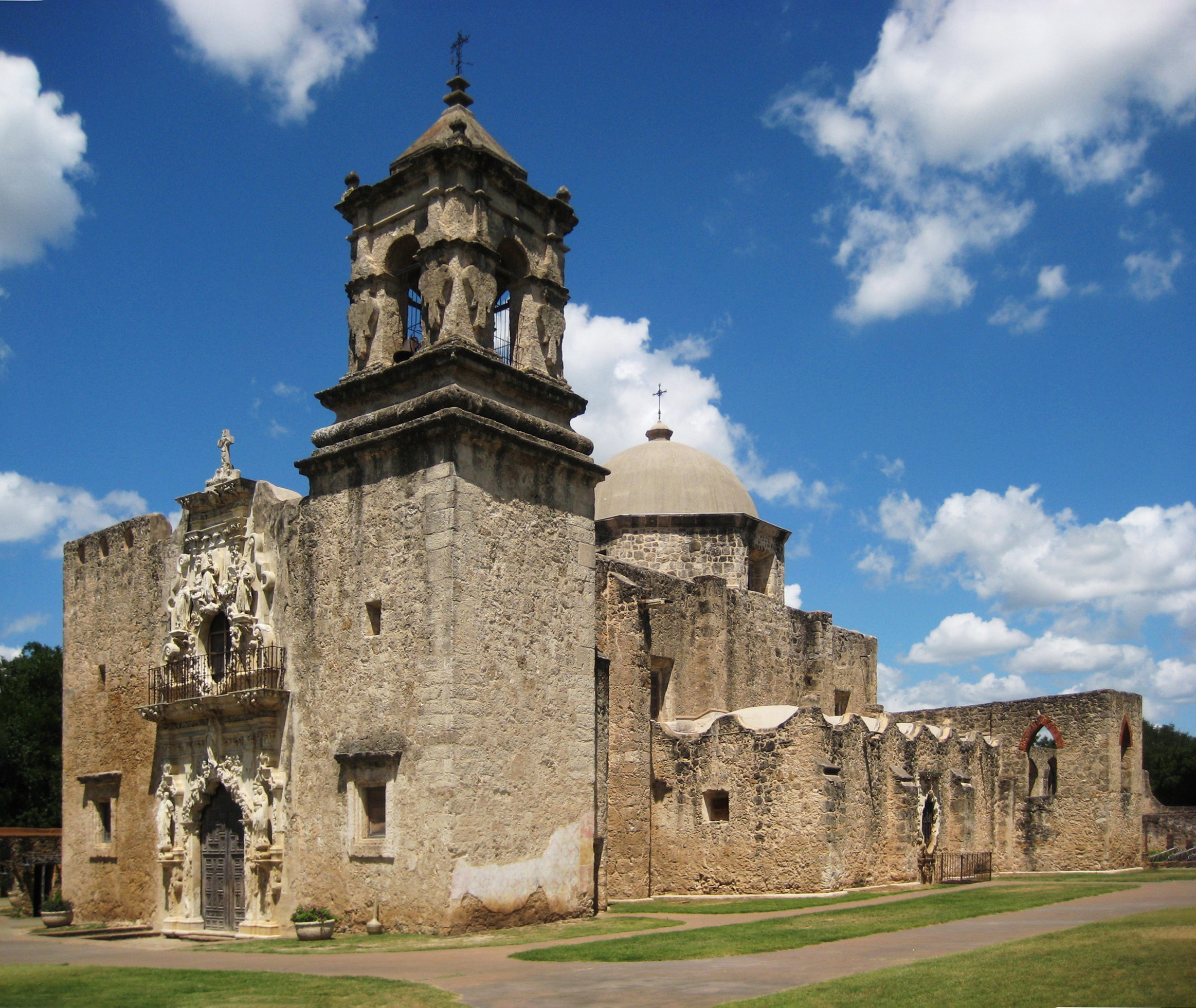
- The church of Mission San José y San Miguel de Aguayo

- Location within Texas Location within the United States

Religion
- Affiliation: Roman Catholic

Location
- Location: San Antonio, Texas, United States
- Coordinates: 29°21′44″N 98°28′47″W

Architecture
- Style: Spanish Colonial
- Groundbreaking: Founded 1720; Work began in 1768
- Completed: 1782
- UNESCO World Heritage Site
- Criteria: Cultural: (ii)
- Designated: 2015 (39th session)
- Parent listing: San Antonio Missions
- Reference no.: 1466-003
- State Party: United States
- Region: Europe and North America

Mission San José y San Miguel de Aguayo is an historic Catholic mission in San Antonio, Texas, United States. The mission was named in part for the Marquis de San Miguel de Aguayo, José de Azlor y Virto de Vera.

== History ==
The mission was founded by the Cana people on February 23, 1720, because Mission San Antonio de Valero had become overcrowded shortly after its founding with refugees from the closed East Texas missions. Father Antonio Margil received permission from the governor of Coahuila and Texas, the Marquis de San Miguel de Aguayo, to build a new mission 5 miles (8 km) south of San Antonio de Valero. Like San Antonio de Valero, Mission San José served the Coahuiltecan Natives. The first buildings, made of brush, straw, and mud, were quickly replaced by large stone structures, including guest rooms, offices, a dining room, and a pantry. A heavy outer wall was built around the main part of the mission, and rooms for 350 Natives were built into the walls.

A new church, which is still standing, was constructed in 1768 from local limestone. The mission lands were given to its Natives in 1794, and mission activities officially ended in 1824. After that, the buildings were home to soldiers, the homeless, and bandits. Starting in 1933, the Civil Works Administration and then the Works Progress Administration provided the labor to rebuild and restore the grounds of the mission. Some of the funding for the restoration came from money allotted by the United States for the Texas Centennial Exposition held in Dallas in 1936. The mission walls and Indian quarters were re-built, and the granary was restored.

Mission San José is now part of the San Antonio Missions National Historical Park. In 2015, along with The Alamo and Mission Concepción, it became one of five missions in San Antonio designated a World Heritage Site by the United Nations Education, Scientific and Cultural Organization.

Today the mission is an active parish, and is staffed by the Order of Friars Minor. The current pastor is Fr. Rogelio Martinez, OFM.

== Architecture ==
The church facade features from the top: a cross, representing Jesus Christ, Saint Joseph (San José) holding the infant Jesus, Saint Dominic and Saint Francis, Our Lady of Guadalupe (the Virgin Mary), Saint Joachim and Saint Anne holding the infant Mary. Located at the south wall of the church sacristy is the Rose Window. Sculptor and significance of the Rose Window is unknown. According to folklore, the window was sculpted by a Spanish master craftsman and artist Pedro Huizar and dedicated it to his sweetheart Rosa who, on her way from Spain to meet with Pedro, lost her life at sea. The Rose Window was sculpted in 1775 and is an example of Baroque architecture in America.

Many buildings on the campus of Texas Tech University in Lubbock, Texas, borrow architectural elements from those found at Mission San José.

== See also ==
- Spanish missions in Texas
- Mission Nuestra Señora de la Purísima Concepción de Acuña; also Mission Concepcion
- Mission San Juan Capistrano
- Mission San Francisco de la Espada
- Espada Acequia
- Ethel Wilson Harris House
