= Kellum-Noble House =

Historic building in Houston, Texas

- U.S. National Register of Historic Places
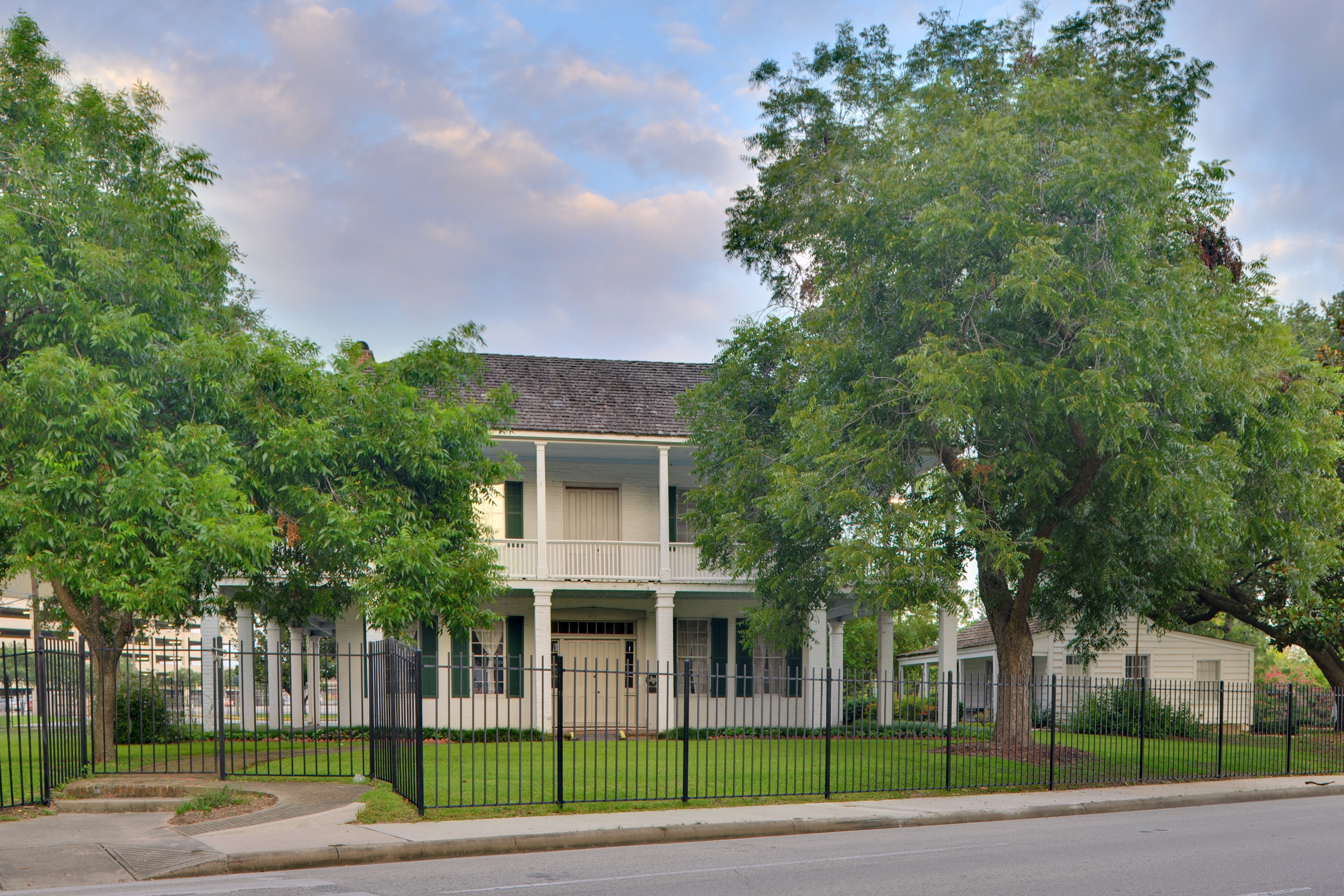

- Location within Texas Location within the United States
- Location: 212 Dallas St., Houston, Texas
- Coordinates: 29°45′31″N 95°22′19″W
- Area: 1 acre (0.40 ha)
- Built: 1847
- Architectural style: Greek Revival
- NRHP reference No.: 75001989
- Added to NRHP: April 3, 1975

Kellum-Noble House is a historic building in Houston, Texas. It is the oldest surviving building in Houston resting on its original foundation. The building was built in 1847 in a Greek Revival style and was added to the National Register of Historic Places in 1975.

== History ==
The modern name given to the house refers to the two families that owned the property throughout its history. The first owner, Nathaniel Kellum, owned a brickyard on the bayou that would supply the brick used to build the home.

== See also ==
- List of the oldest buildings in Texas
