= French Legation, Texas =

- French Legation
- U.S. National Register of Historic Places
- Recorded Texas Historic Landmark
- Texas State Antiquities Landmark
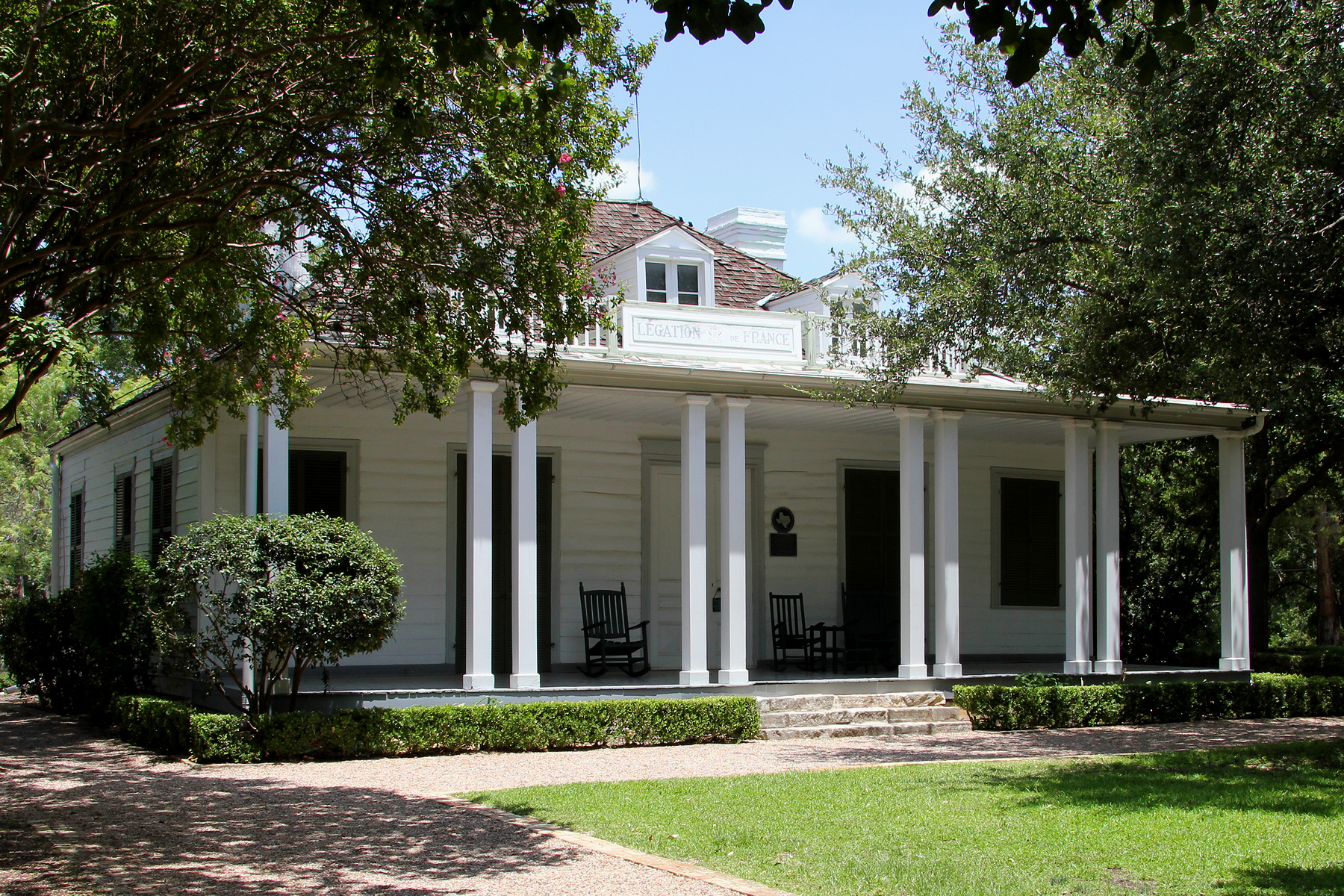
- The French Legation now serves as a period museum and host to a variety of community events.

- Location within Texas Location within the United States
- Location: 802 San Marcos St. Austin, Texas, USA
- Coordinates: 30°16′01″N 97°43′56″W
- Built: 1841
- NRHP reference No.: 69000213
- RTHL No.: 14828
- TSAL No.: 602

Significant dates
- Added to NRHP: November 25, 1969
- Designated RTHL: 1962
- Designated TSAL: 5/28/1981

The French Legation is a historic legation building in eastern Austin, Texas, built in 1841 to represent the French government in the new Republic of Texas.

It is among the oldest extant frame structures in Austin. The building and its surroundings were added to the National Register of Historic Places in 1969. The French Legation is also a Recorded Texas Historic Landmark, a City of Austin Historic Landmark, and a Texas State Antiquities Landmark.

Beginning in the 1940s, the historic site and its buildings were managed and operated by the Daughters of the Republic of Texas as custodians for the State of Texas which holds title to the property. Operation was transferred to the Texas Historical Commission in 2017.

== History ==
After Texas declared independence from Mexico in 1836, France was one of two countries (the other being the United States) to officially recognize Texas as an independent state. The Treaty of Amity, Navigation, and Commerce between the two countries formalized this recognition. On September 25, Paris dispatched Jean Pierre Isidore Alphonse Dubois de Saligny, a secretary to the French Legation in Washington, to be the new chargé d'affaires to the Republic of Texas, representing the King of the French, Louis Philippe.

The legation structure was completed in 1841, approximately a half-mile (.8 km) east of the city center. Dubois gave multi-course dinner parties in the cabin he rented downtown as his mansion was built, and worked with legislators to bring French settlers to Texas. However, Count de Saligny's stay in Austin had been subject to conflict. Dubois and the inn-keeper Richard Bullock were enemies. His conflict with Austinites even came to blows in the so-called 1841 Pig War, when his butler killed several havoc-wreaking pigs belonging to Bullock and was in turn assaulted by Bullock.

After the young nation's capital was temporarily moved to Washington-on-the-Brazos in 1842 during the Archive War, Dubois' house was abandoned. The French government recalled Count de Saligny in 1846, when Texas was annexed by the United States.

The mansion was later occupied by John Mary Odin, first Bishop of the Roman Catholic Diocese of Galveston, and then Moseley Baker, a veteran of the Texas Revolution, in 1847. Dr. Joseph W. Robertson bought the estate from Baker, and generations of his family resided there until 1940.

During his time in Austin, Dubois held at least three slaves. The Robertson family owned at least nine slaves at their property, using them to supply food and to perform household chores.

The state of Texas purchased the site from Robertson's heirs in 1945. At that time, the state placed the property in the custody of the Daughters of the Republic of Texas (DRT), who established the French Legation Museum in 1949. The DRT restored the legation building and grounds in a manner similar to other house museums in the mid-twentieth century. The collection included few original objects, and the interior finishes chosen during the restoration conflicted with later paint analysis. The site opened to the public on April 5, 1956.

The view of the Texas State Capitol from the front porch of the French Legation is one of the Capitol View Corridors protected under state and local law from obstruction by tall buildings since 1983. Since the mid 1990s, the professional staff has worked to include the surrounding East Austin community in its programs and interpretation.

== See also ==
- Texas Legation
- List of the oldest buildings in Texas
