= Mission Concepcion =

Historic place in Texas, United States

Mission Nuestra Señora de la Purísima Concepción de Acuña
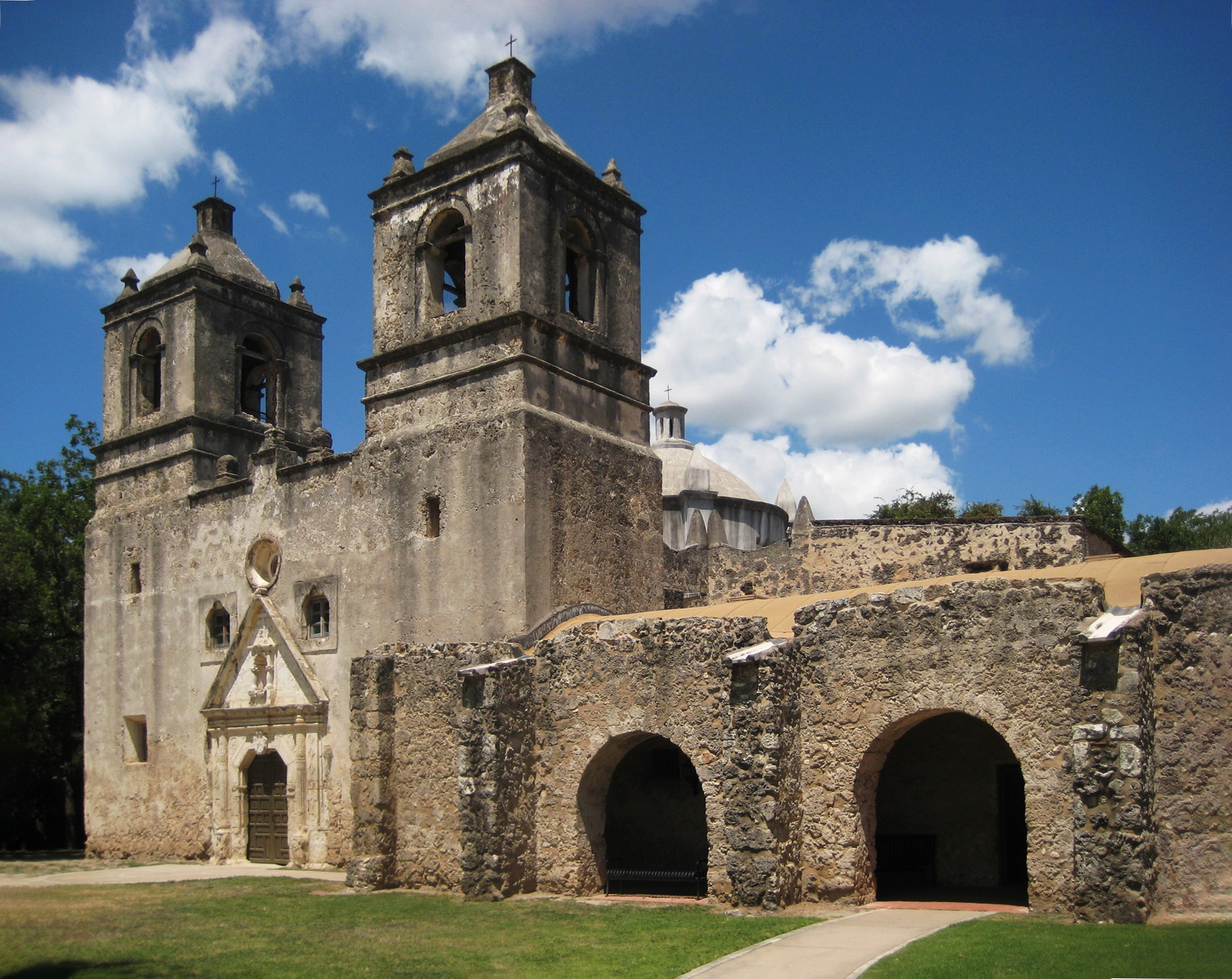
- The church of Mission Concepción

- Location within Texas

Religion
- Affiliation: Roman Catholic

Location
- Location: 807 Mission Rd; San Antonio, Texas 78210
- Coordinates: 29°23′28″N 98°29′28″W

Architecture
- Style: Spanish Colonial
- Completed: 1731
- UNESCO World Heritage Site
- Criteria: Cultural: (ii)
- Designated: 2015 (39th session)
- Parent listing: San Antonio Missions
- Reference no.: 1466-004
- State Party: United States
- Region: Europe and North America
- U.S. National Historic Landmark
- Designated: April 15, 1970
- Reference no.: 70000740

Franciscan Friars established Mission Nuestra Señora de la Purísima Concepción de Acuña (also Mission Concepción) in 1711 as Nuestra Señora de la Purísima Concepción de los Hainais in East Texas. The mission was begun by the Domingo Ramón-St. Denis expedition and was originally meant to be a base for converting the Hasinai to Catholicism and teaching them what they needed to know to become Spanish citizens. The friars moved the mission in 1731 to San Antonio. After its relocation most of the people in the mission were Pajalats who spoke a Coahuiltecan language. Catholic Mass is still held at the mission every Sunday.

On October 28, 1835, Mexican troops under Colonel Domingo de Ugartechea and Texian insurgents led by James Bowie and James Fannin fought the Battle of Concepción here. Historian J.R. Edmondson describes the 30-minute engagement as "the first major engagement of the Texas Revolution."

Mission Concepción is the oldest unrestored stone church in America. it was designated a National Historic Landmark on April 15, 1970, and is part of San Antonio Missions National Historical Park. In 2015, the United Nations Educational, Scientific, and Cultural Organization designated Concepción and four other San Antonio missions, including The Alamo, as a World Heritage Site, the first in Texas and one of twenty-three such establishments in the United States.

Mission Concepción consists of a sanctuary, nave, convento, and granary. When originally built, brightly painted frescos decorated both the exterior and interior of the building. Traces of the frescoes still exist on the weathered facade of the building. Experts restored some of the artwork on the interior ceilings and walls of the convento in 1988. The Archdiocese of San Antonio completed another restoration of the mission's interior in 2010 which exposed more frescoes in the sanctuary and nave.

== Gallery ==
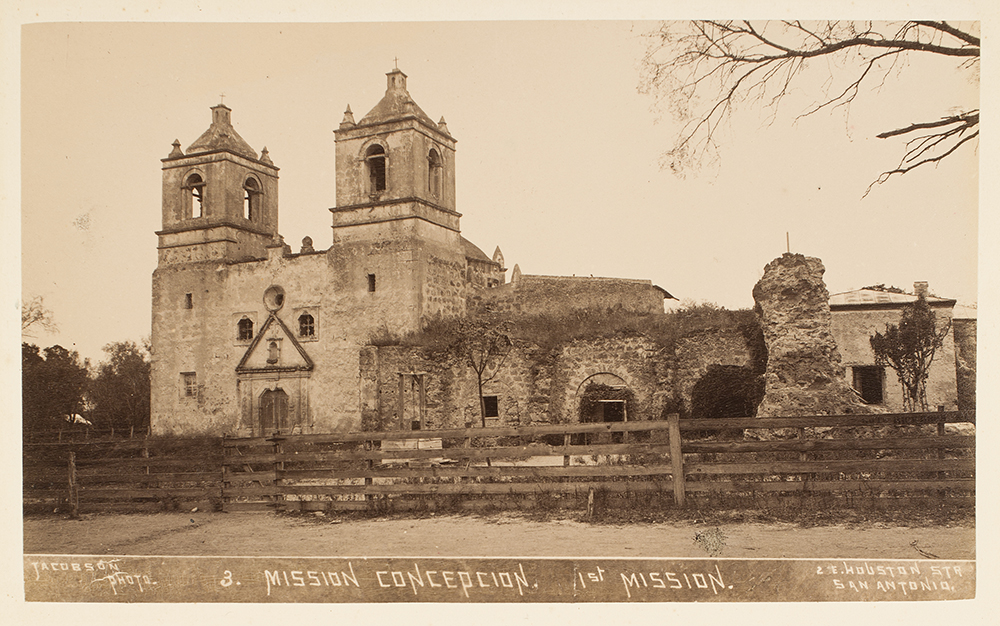
The church in 1892.

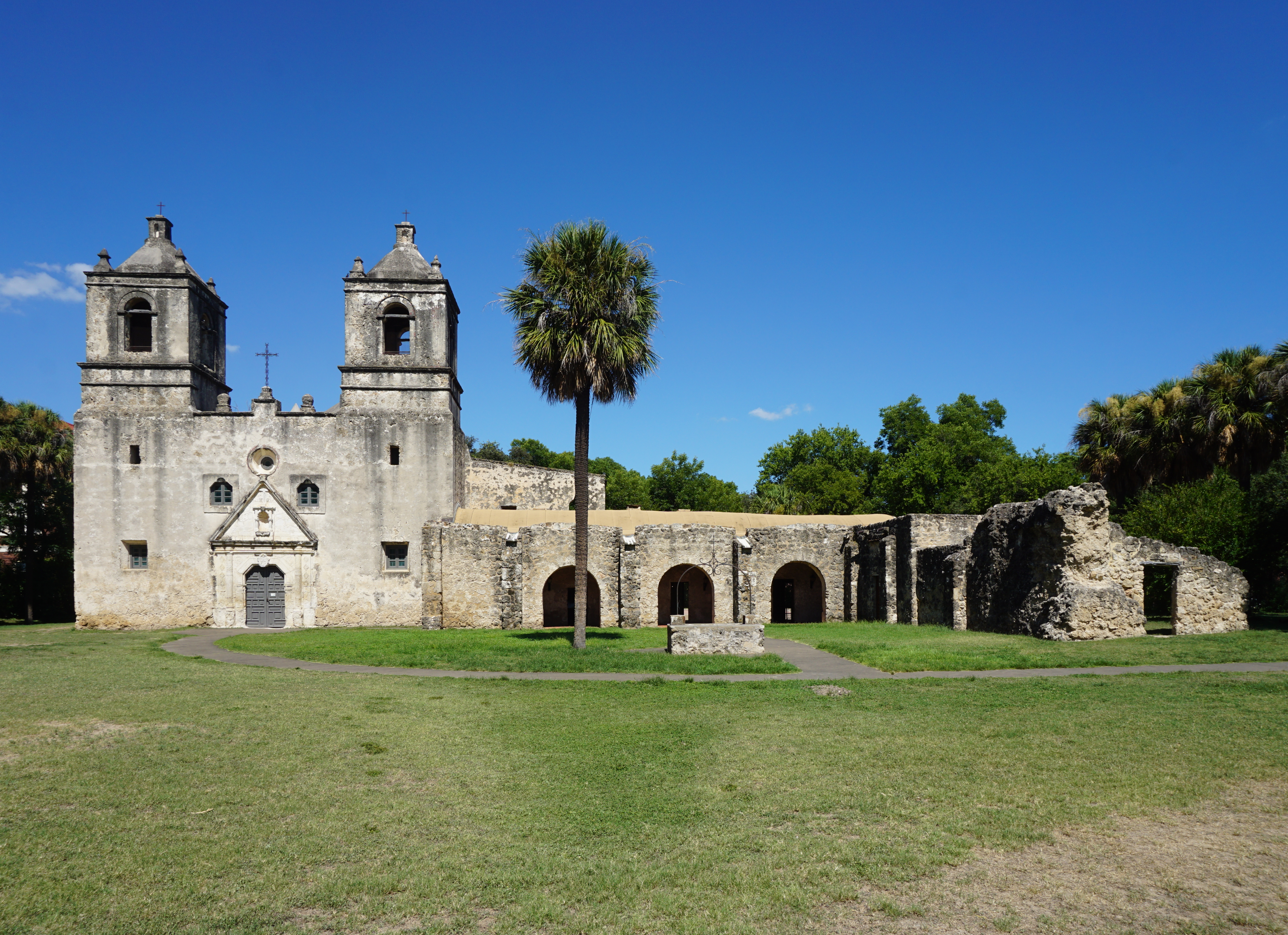
The church in 2017.

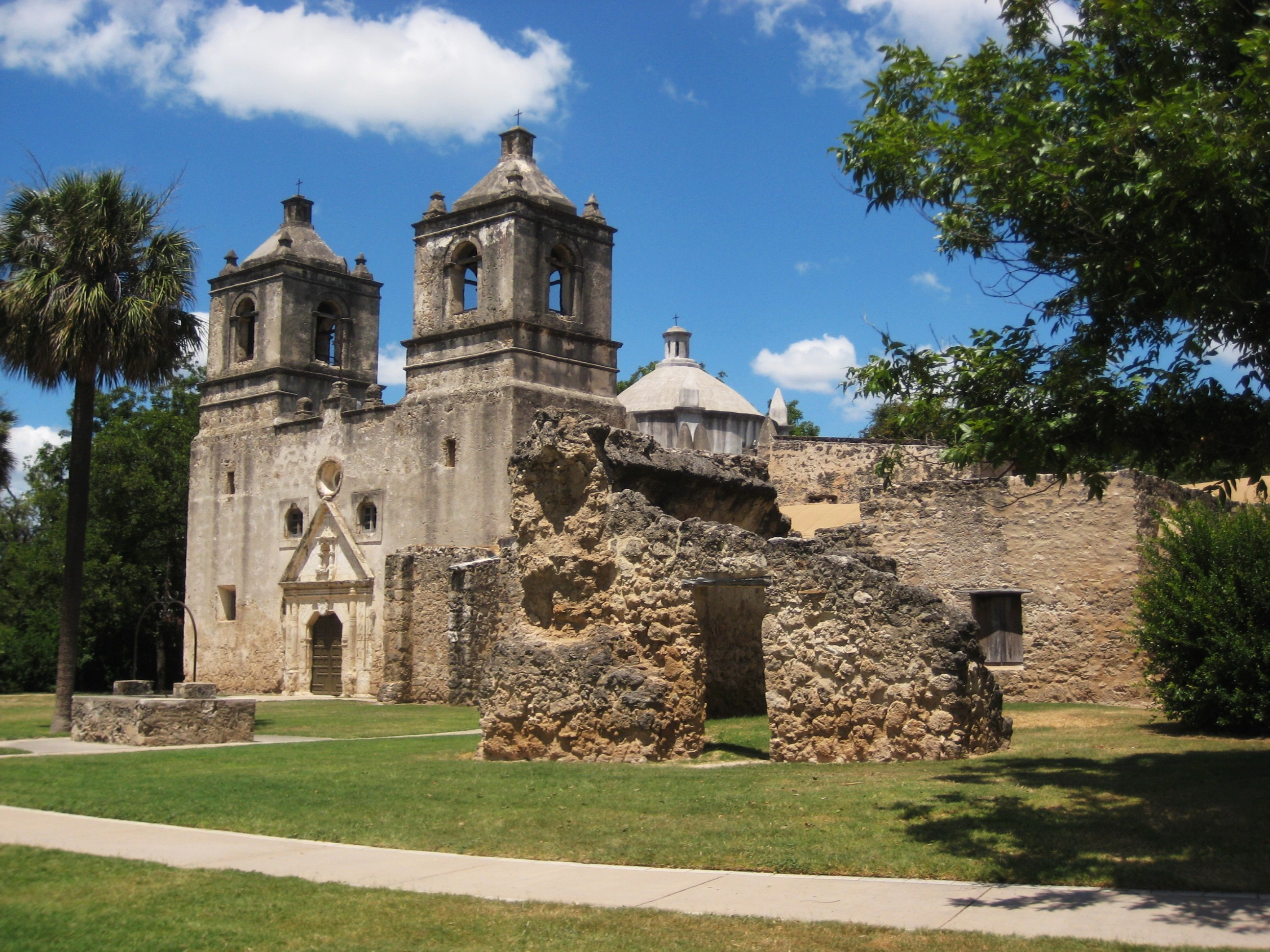
The area surrounding the mission.

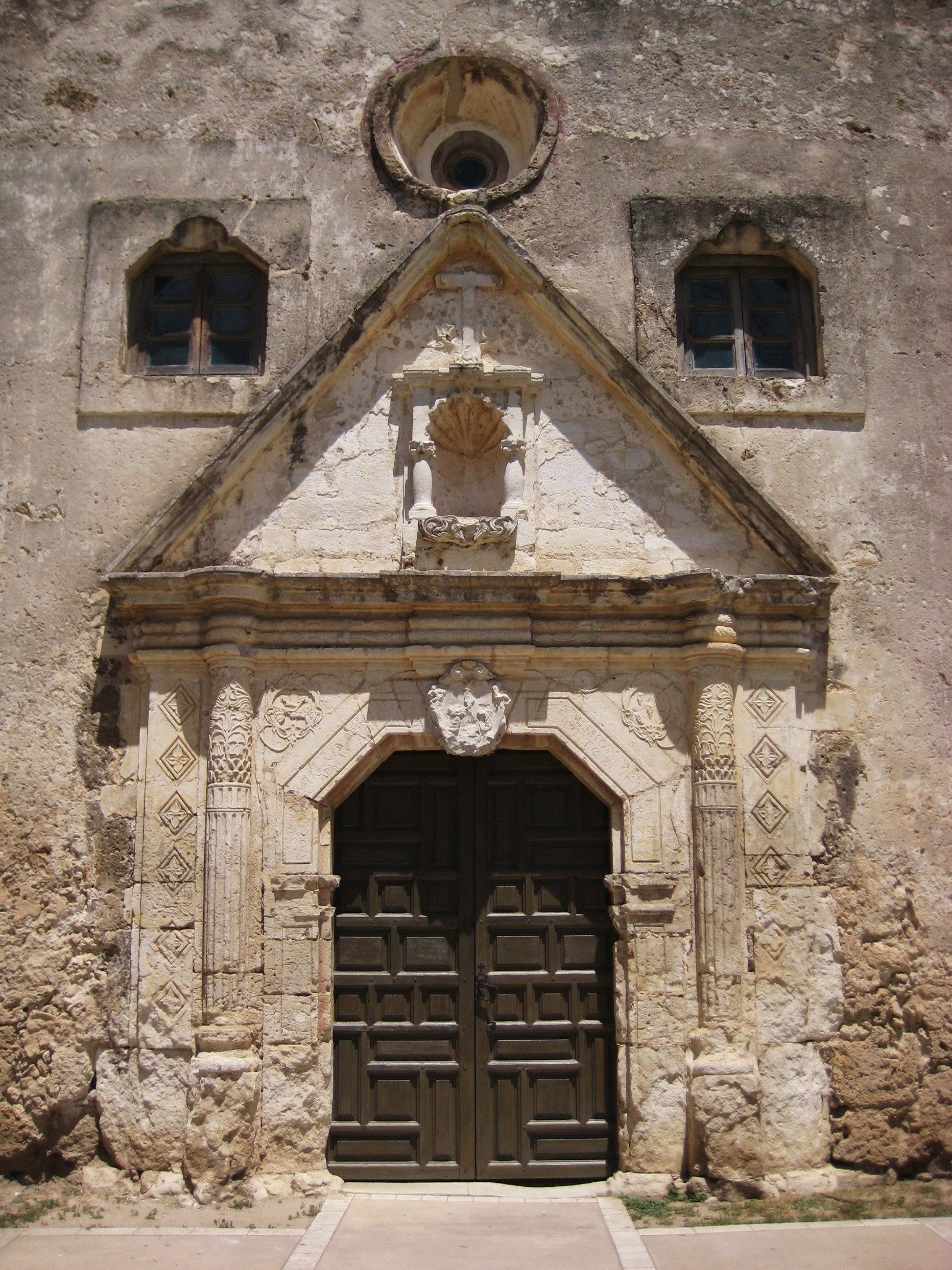
The portal to the church.

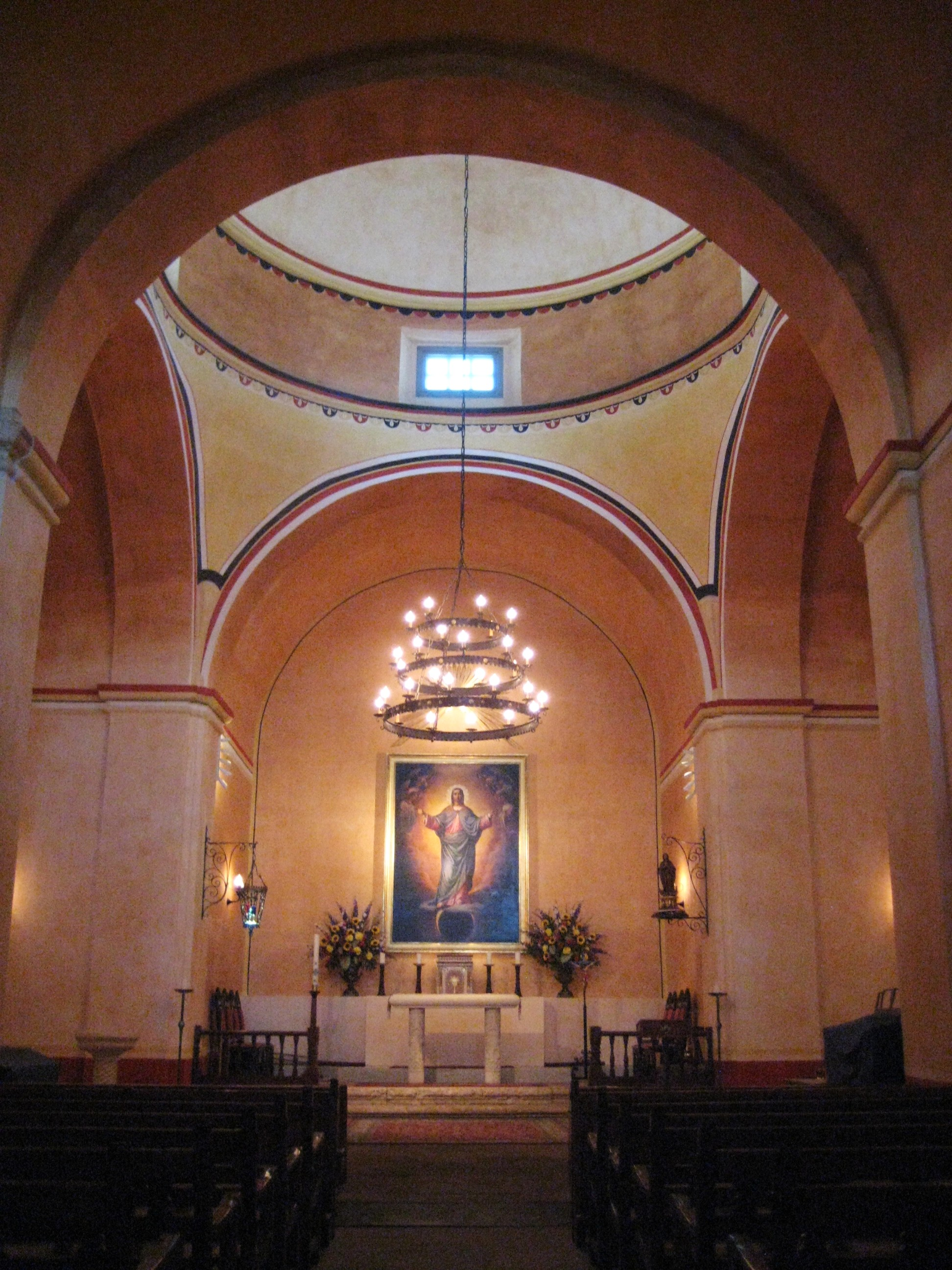
Interior of the church.

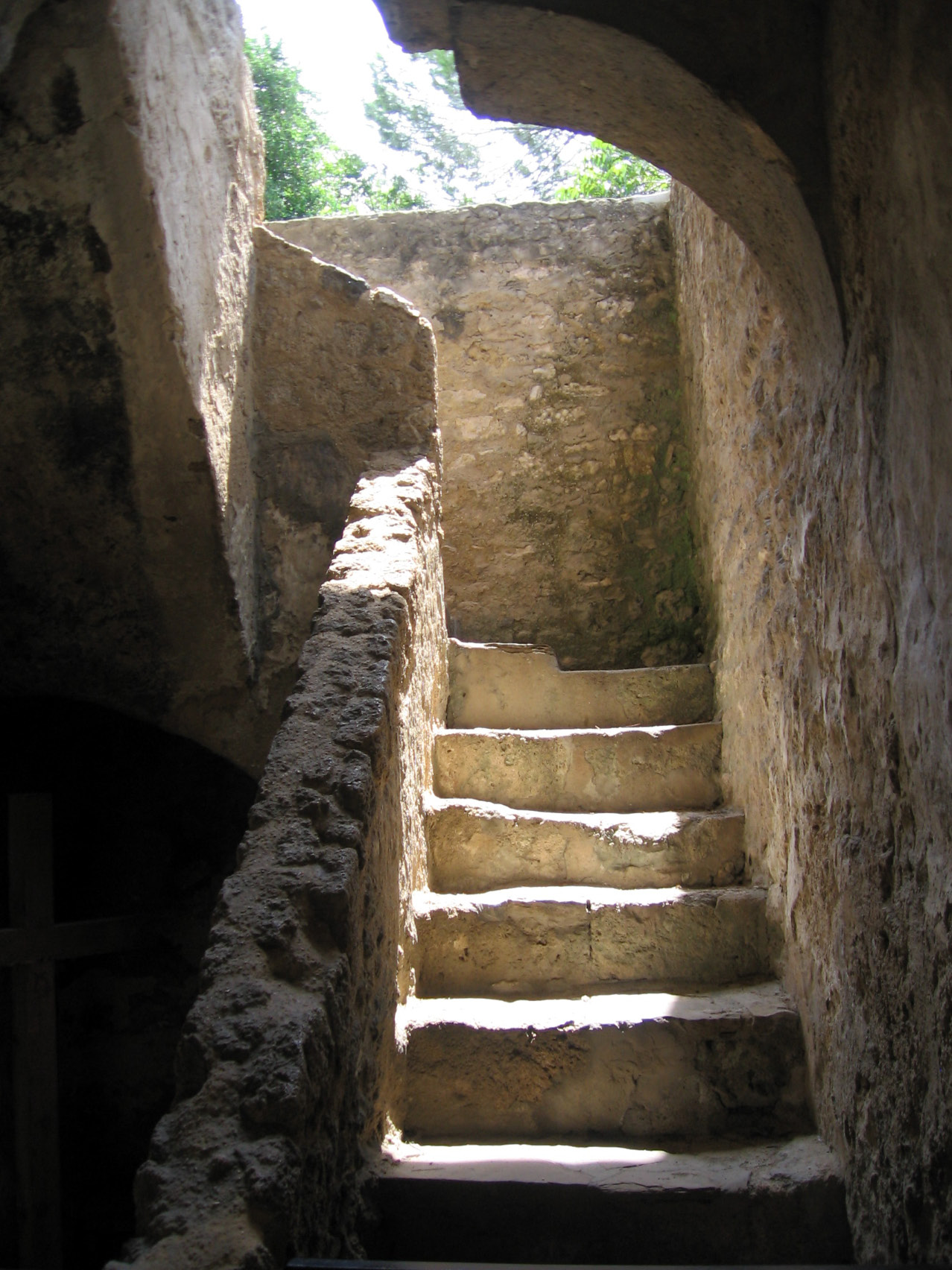
Stairwell adjacent to the church leading to the former Father President's office

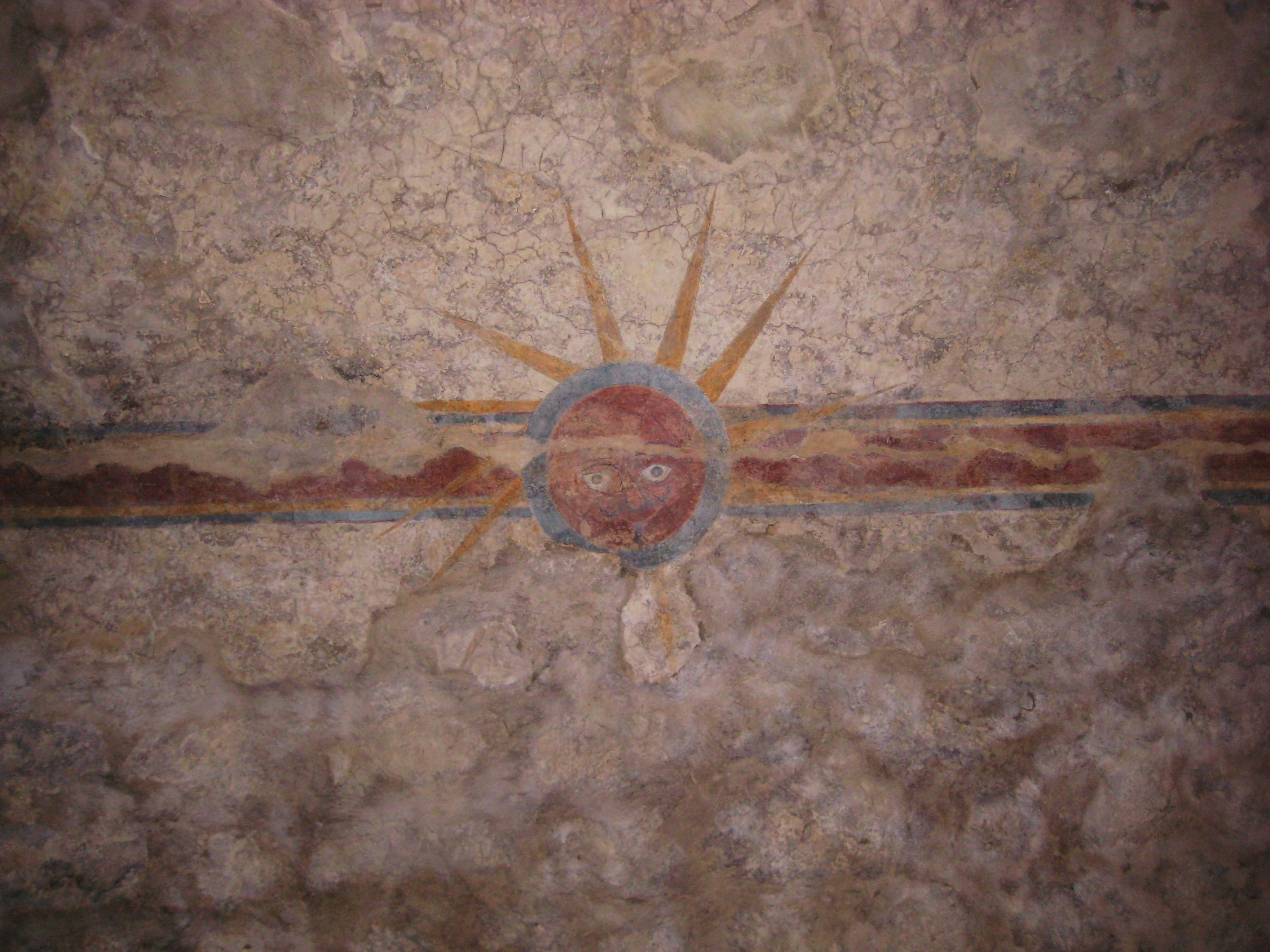
Interior fresco upon the ceiling of the old library in the convento.

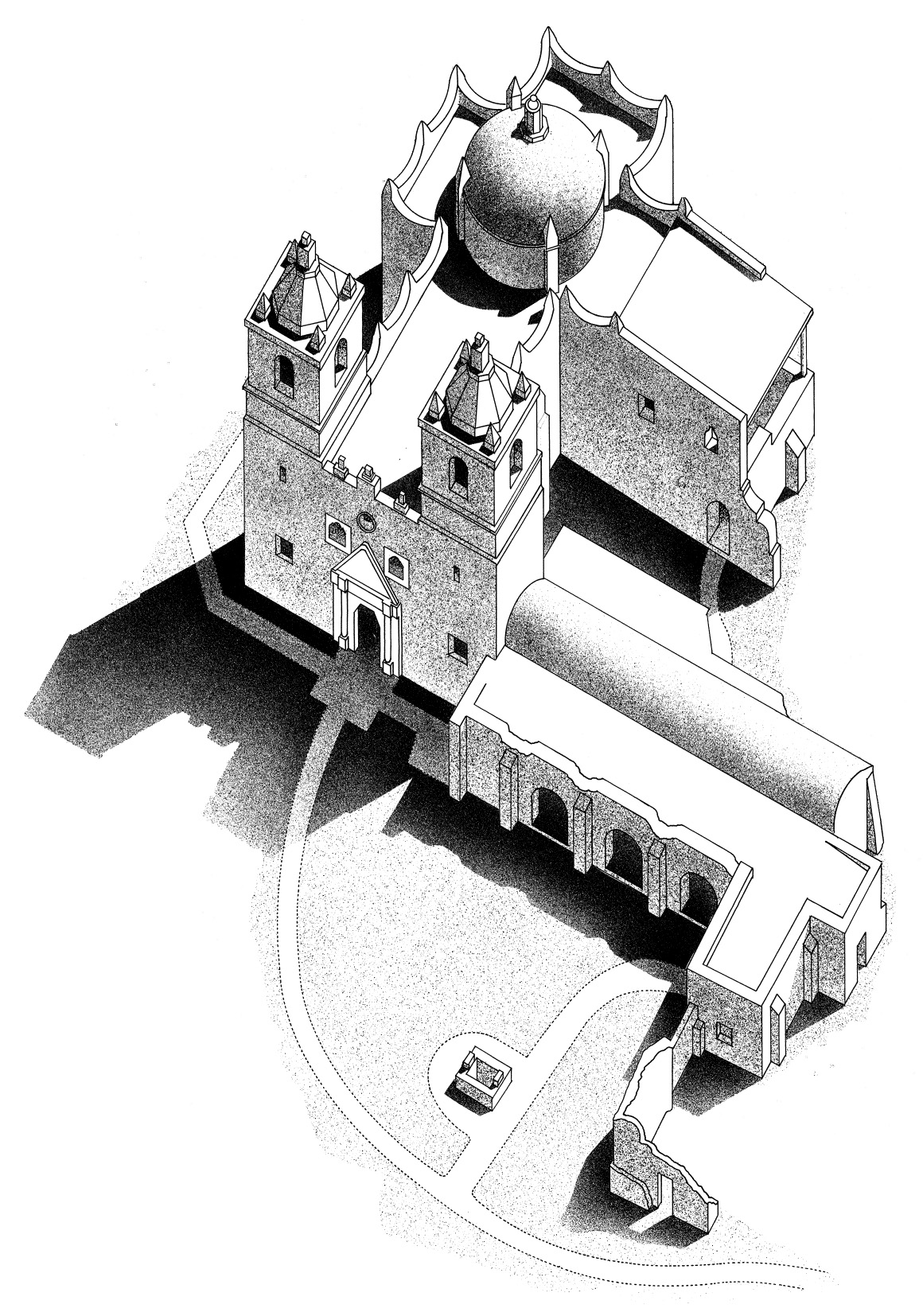
Architectural drawing from HAER

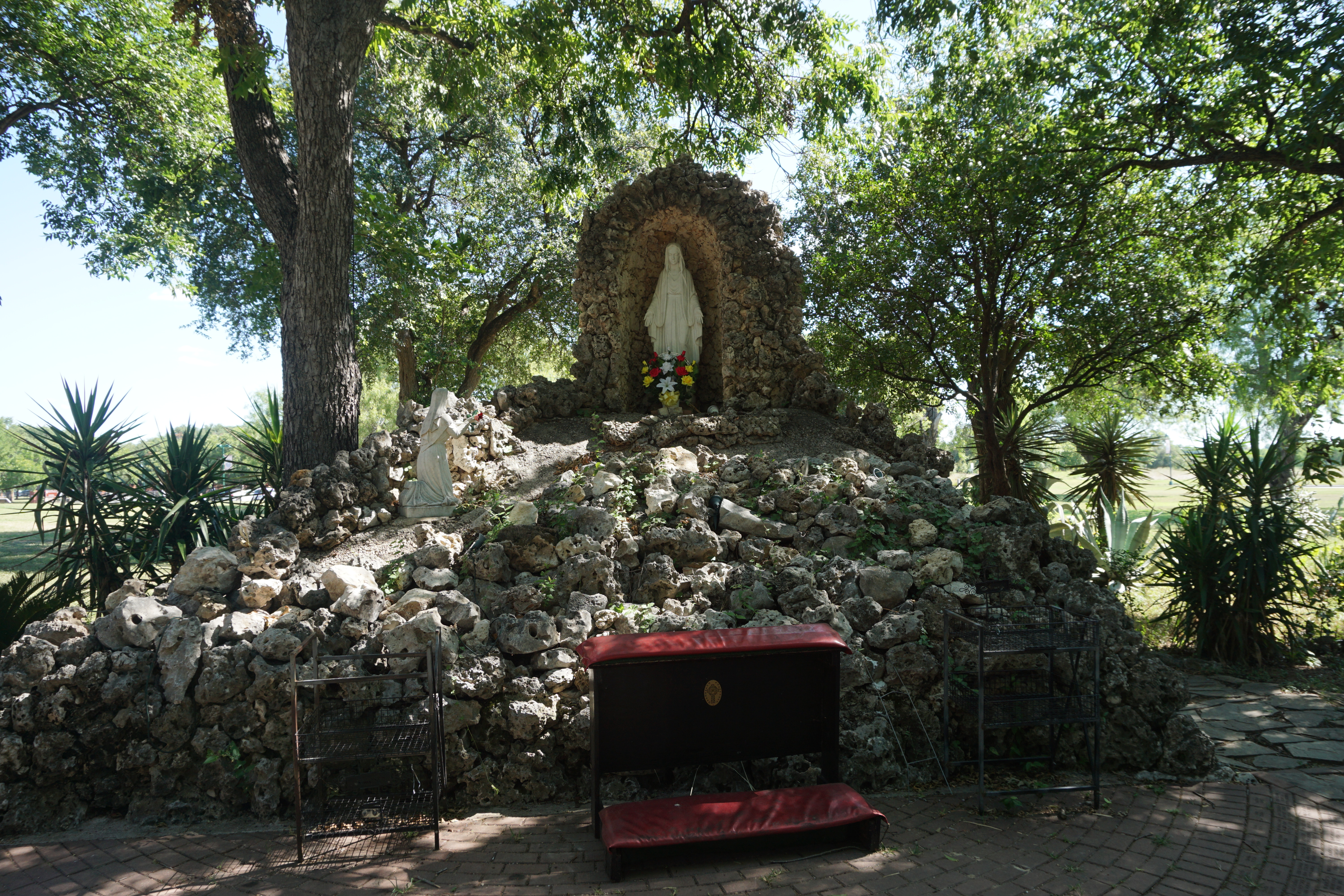
The grotto in 2017.

== Solar alignment ==
The western entrance to the church is aligned to the sunset in such a way that an "annual double solar illumination event" occurs every year on or around August 15, the feast day of the Assumption of Mary.

== See also ==
- Spanish missions in Texas
- Mission San José y San Miguel de Aguayo
- Mission San Juan Capistrano
- Mission San Francisco de la Espada
- Espada Acequia
