= Acequia Madre =

Acequia Madre is Spanish for "mother ditch", a main acequia or irrigation canal.

Acequia Madre may refer to:

- Acequia Madre (Santa Fe), New Mexico
- Acequia Madre (Las Vegas, New Mexico)
- Acequia Madre de Valero (San Antonio), Texas

== See also ==
- Acequia (disambiguation)
