= Ethel Wilson Harris House =

Historic house in Texas, United States

- U.S. National Register of Historic Places
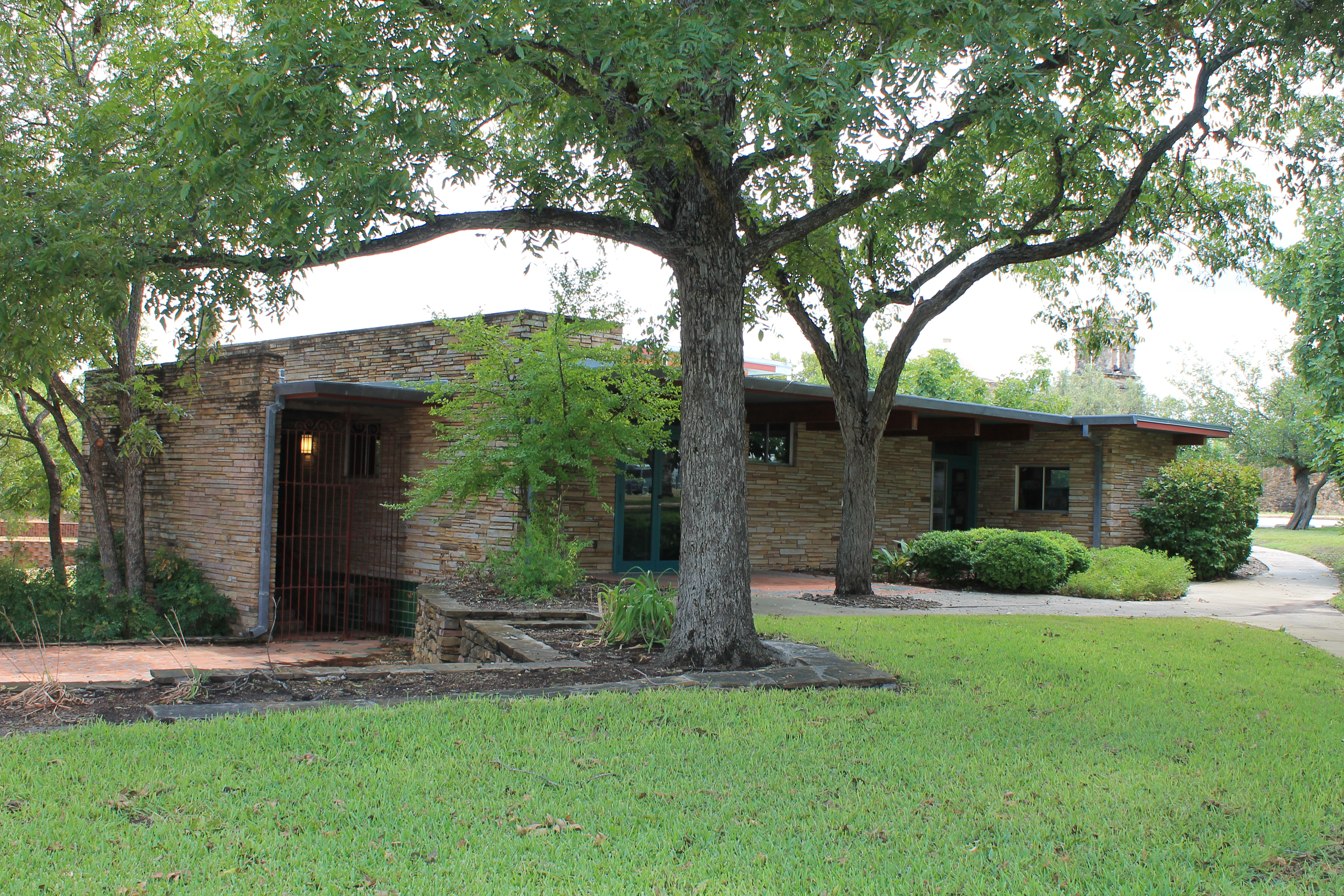

- Location within Texas Location within the United States
- Location: 6519 San Jose Dr.--San Antonio Missions NHP, San Antonio, Texas
- Coordinates: 29°21′47″N 98°28′47″W
- Area: 0.6 acres (0.24 ha)
- Built: 1956
- Architects: Harris, Robert
- Architectural style: Modern Movement, Wrightian
- NRHP reference No.: 01000325
- Added to NRHP: April 3, 2001

The Ethel Wilson Harris House is a house built in 1956 located in what is now the San Antonio Missions National Historical Park, outside the perimeter walls of the Mission San Jose, in San Antonio, Texas, USA. It is a Modern Movement or Wrightian architecture style house built in 1956, designed by Robert Harris.

The house was documented in the Historic American Buildings Survey and is listed in the NRHP for its architecture.

It is a two-story frame, stone and concrete house, approximately 2,000 square feet (190 m^{2}) in area, that is quite like a Usonian house.

It was a home of artist and conservationist Ethel Wilson Harris. Harris was a supervisor of Arts & Crafts projects for the Works Progress Administration in San Antonio. Two of her tile murals are on the San Antonio River Walk.
