= Acequia Park =

Park in San Antonio, Texas

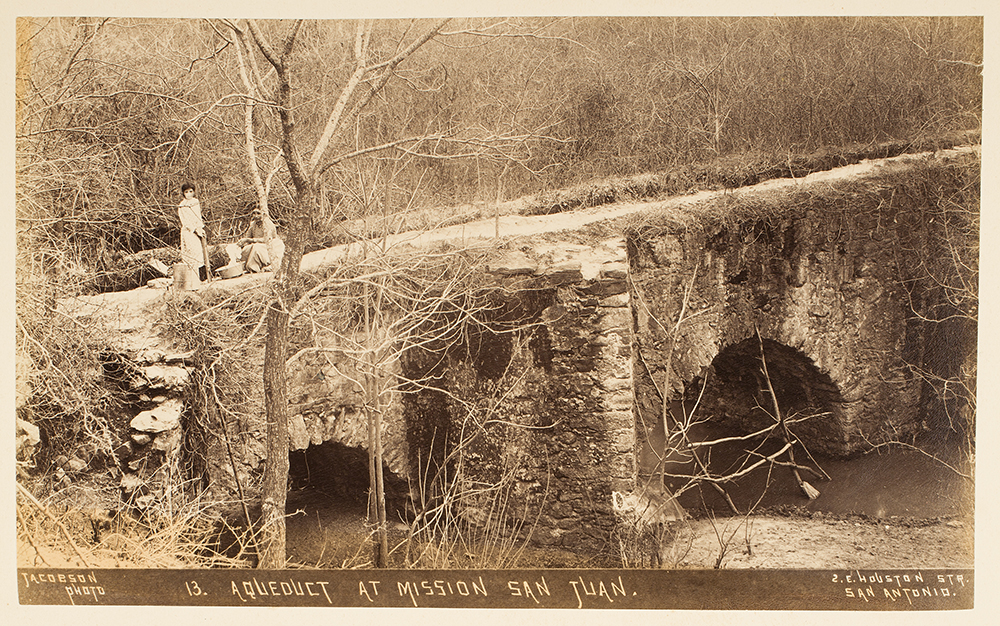
- San Juan Aqueduct c. 1892

- Location within Texas Location within the United States
- Type: Public City Park
- Location: 8500 Mission Parkway, San Antonio, Texas
- Coordinates: 29°20′12″N 98°27′55″W
- Area: 72.52 acres (0.2935 km^{2})
- Created: 1975
- Owner: San Antonio Missions National Historical Park
- Operator: City of San Antonio Parks and Recreation
- Open: Sunday-Saturday: 5 a.m. – 11 p.m.
- San Juan Dam and Acequia System
- U.S. Historic district – Contributing property
- Part of: San Antonio Missions National Historical Park (ID78003147)
- Designated CP: February 20, 1983

Acequia Park is located in the city of San Antonio in the U.S. state of Texas. There are picnic tables and restrooms, but alcohol is not allowed in the park. The origins of the park date back to Spanish missionaries, who worked with mission Indians to create a water system sourced by the San Antonio River. The San Antonio Conservation Society (SACS) purchased much of this acreage in 1957 to preserve the area's environment. Because the San Antonio River Authority planned to reconfigure the river channel, SACS joined local land owners in filing a successful water rights and water flow lawsuit against the Authority. In 1975, SACS deeded the property to the City of San Antonio with the stipulation that it be used as a public park.

== See also ==
- National Register of Historic Places listings in Bexar County, Texas
