= San Antonio Missions (World Heritage Site) =

World heritage site in the United States

UNESCO World Heritage Site
- Interactive map of San Antonio Missions
- Location: San Antonio, Texas, United States
- Includes: Five mission sites and a historic ranch
- Criteria: Cultural: (ii)
- Reference: 1466
- Inscription: 2015 (39th Session)
- Area: 300.8 ha (743 acres)
- Buffer zone: 2,068 ha (5,110 acres)

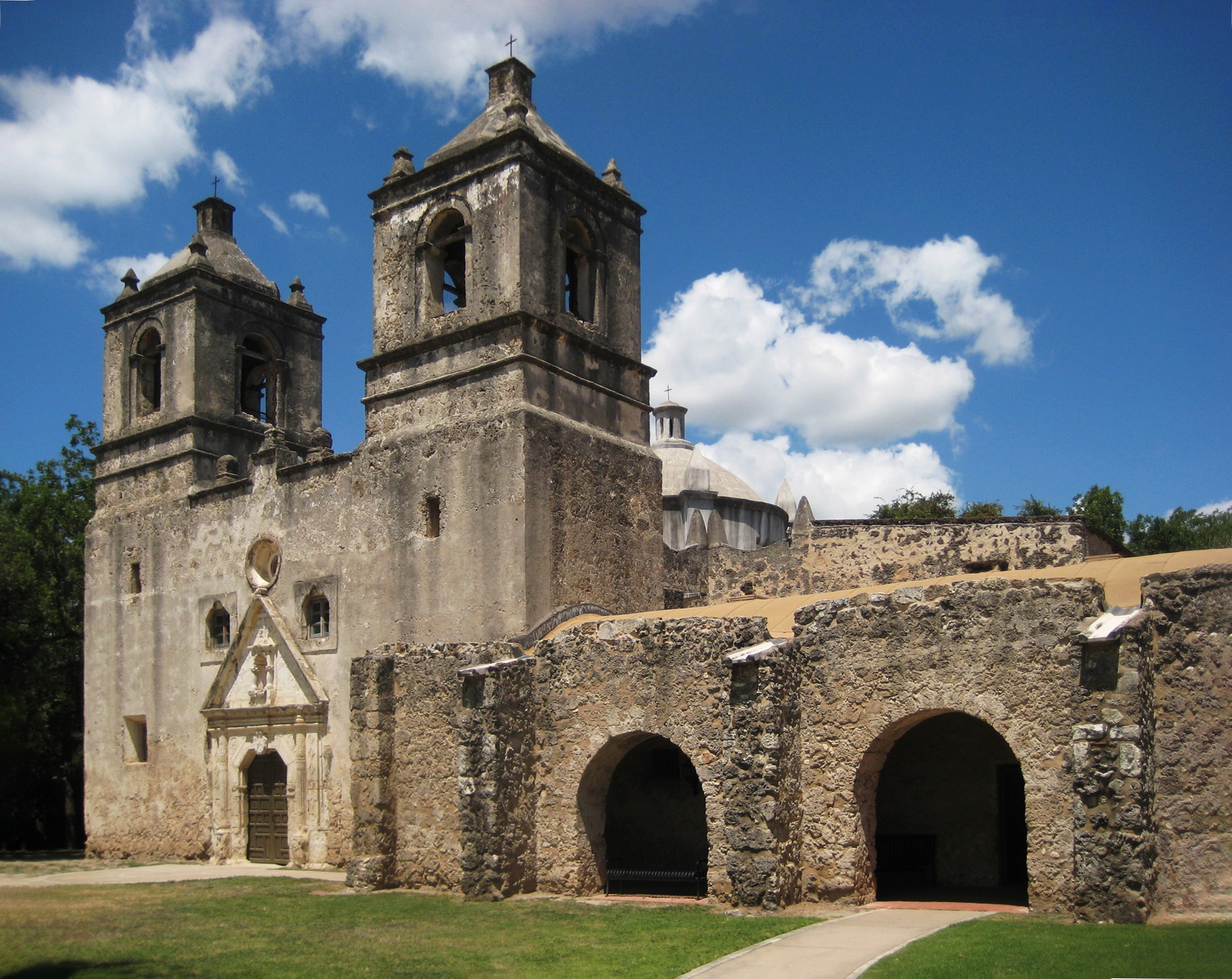
Mission Concepcion at San Antonio, Texas

The San Antonio Missions are a World Heritage Site located in and near San Antonio, Texas, United States. The World Heritage Site consists of five mission sites, a historic ranch, and related properties. These outposts were established in the early 1700s by Catholic religious orders to spread Christianity among the local natives. These missions formed part of the colonization system of New Spain that stretched across the Mexican Northeast in the 17th, 18th, and 19th centuries. With the independence of Texas and the Mexican-American war, they became part of the United States in 1848.

They were inscribed on the World Heritage List in 2015. Their architectural designs combine Spanish and Coahuiltecan cultures, including Catholic symbols and indigenous designs. They also process the remains of water distribution systems, that shows the combination of the indigenous and colonizers cultures.

== List of the sites ==
| Picture | ID | Mission | Location in San Antonio | Coordinates | Property Area | Buffer Zone |
|---|---|---|---|---|---|---|
| | 1466-001 | Mission Espada | San Antonio Missions National Historical Park | 29°19′04″N 98°27′00″W | 94.7 ha (234 acres) | 2.068 ha (5.11 acres) |
| | 1466-002 | Mission San Juan Capistrano | San Antonio Missions National Historical Park | 29°19′58″N 98°27′19″W | 130.5 ha (322 acres) | None |
| | 1466-003 | Mission San José | San Antonio Missions National Historical Park | 29°21′44″N 98°28′47″W | 20.6 ha (51 acres) | None |
| | 1466-004 | Mission Concepción | San Antonio Missions National Historical Park | 29°23′25″N 98°29′30″W | 13.3 ha (33 acres) | None |
| | 1466-005 | Mission Valero (the Alamo) | Alamo Plaza Historic District | 29°25′33″N 98°29′10″W | 1.7 ha (4.2 acres) | None |
| | 1466-006 | Rancho de las Cabras | Southeast of San Antonio near Floresville | 29°05′42″N 98°10′00″W | 40 ha (99 acres) | None |

== See also ==
- San Antonio Missions National Historical Park
- List of World Heritage Sites in the United States
- List of World Heritage Sites in North America
- Spanish missions in the Americas
