= San Antonio Missions National Historical Park =

Historic district in San Antonio, Texas, US

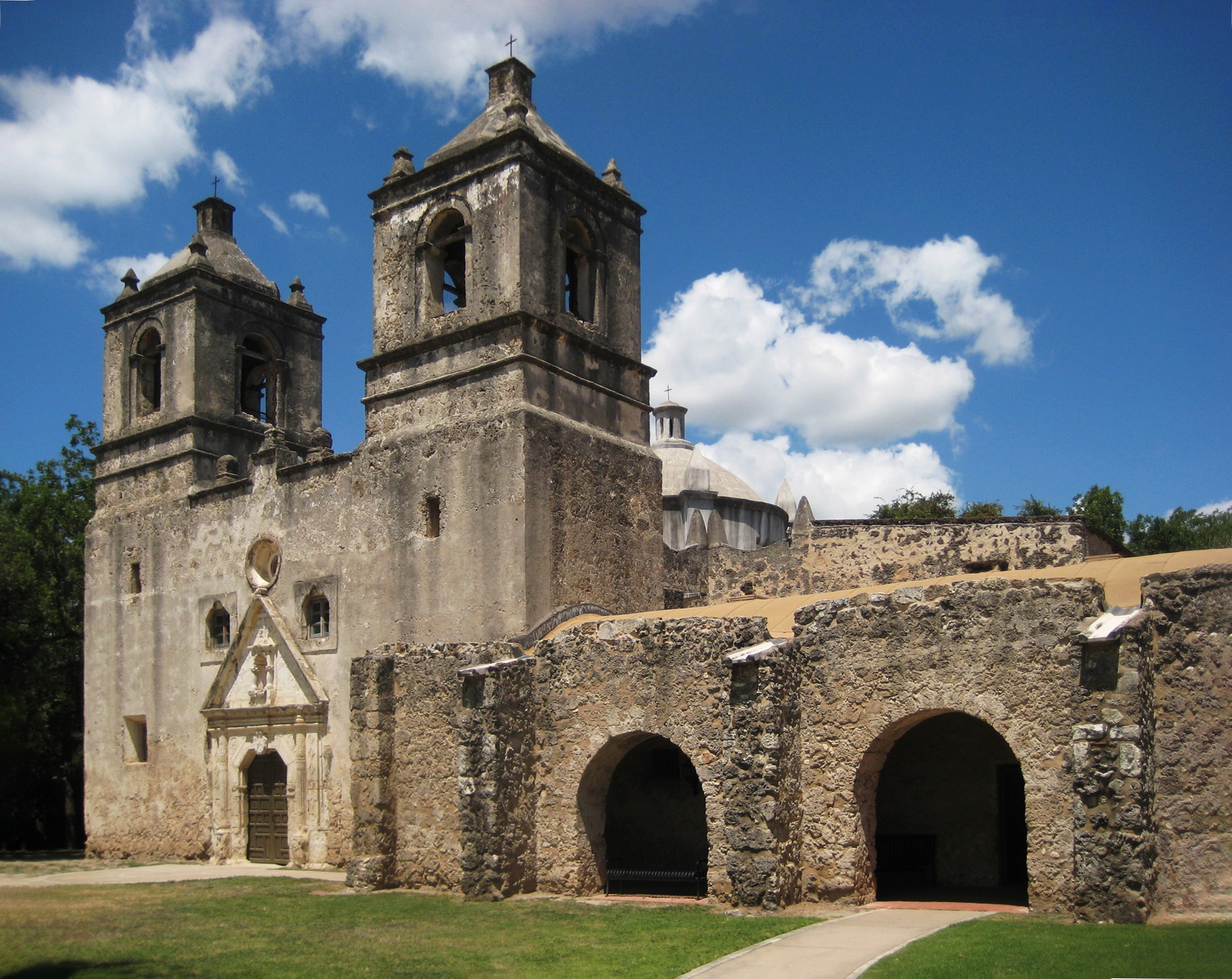
- Mission Concepción

- Location within Texas Location within the United States
- Location: San Antonio, Texas, United States
- Nearest city: San Antonio, TX
- Coordinates: 29°21′42″N 98°28′49″W
- Area: 948 acres (384 ha); 572 acres (231 ha) federal
- Established: April 1, 1983
- Visitors: 1,238,920 (in 2022)
- Governing body: National Park Service
- Website: San Antonio Missions National Historical Park

UNESCO World Heritage Site
- Criteria: Cultural: (ii)
- Designated: 2015 (39th session)
- Part of: San Antonio Missions
- Reference no.: 1466
- Region: Europe and North America

San Antonio Missions National Historical Park is a National Historical Park and part of a UNESCO World Heritage Site preserving four of the five Spanish frontier missions in San Antonio, Texas, US. These outposts were established by Catholic religious orders to spread Christianity among the local natives. These missions formed part of a colonization system that stretched across the Spanish Southwest in the 17th, 18th, and 19th centuries.

In geographic order from north (upstream of the San Antonio River) to south (downstream) the missions are Mission Concepción, Mission San Jose, Mission San Juan, and Mission Espada. The Espada Aqueduct, also part of the Park, is due west of Mission San Juan, across the river.

The fifth (and best known) mission in San Antonio, the Alamo, is not part of the Park. It is located upstream from Mission Concepción, in downtown San Antonio, and is owned by the State of Texas. The Alamo was operated by the Daughters of the Republic of Texas until July 2015, when custodianship was turned over to the Texas General Land Office.

On July 5, 2015, the San Antonio Missions National Historical Park, along with the Alamo Mission in San Antonio, was designated a UNESCO World Heritage site named the San Antonio Missions.

In 2019, the United States Mint released a commemorative quarter as part of the America the Beautiful series honoring the park.

== Administrative history ==
The park was originally established in 1975 as the Mission Parkway on the National Register of Historic Places encompassing 84 separate historical sites along the San Antonio River on the southern side of the city of San Antonio. Within this listing, the National Historical Park was authorized on November 10, 1978. It was established on April 1, 1983, containing many cultural sites along with some natural areas. Portions of the four missions are owned by the Archdiocese of San Antonio and are still run as active parishes.

The Carl Levin and Howard P. "Buck" McKeon National Defense Authorization Act for Fiscal Year 2015 added 137 acres to the park.

In July 2015, the San Antonio Missions were added to the list of UNESCO World Heritage Sites.

== Mission Concepción ==
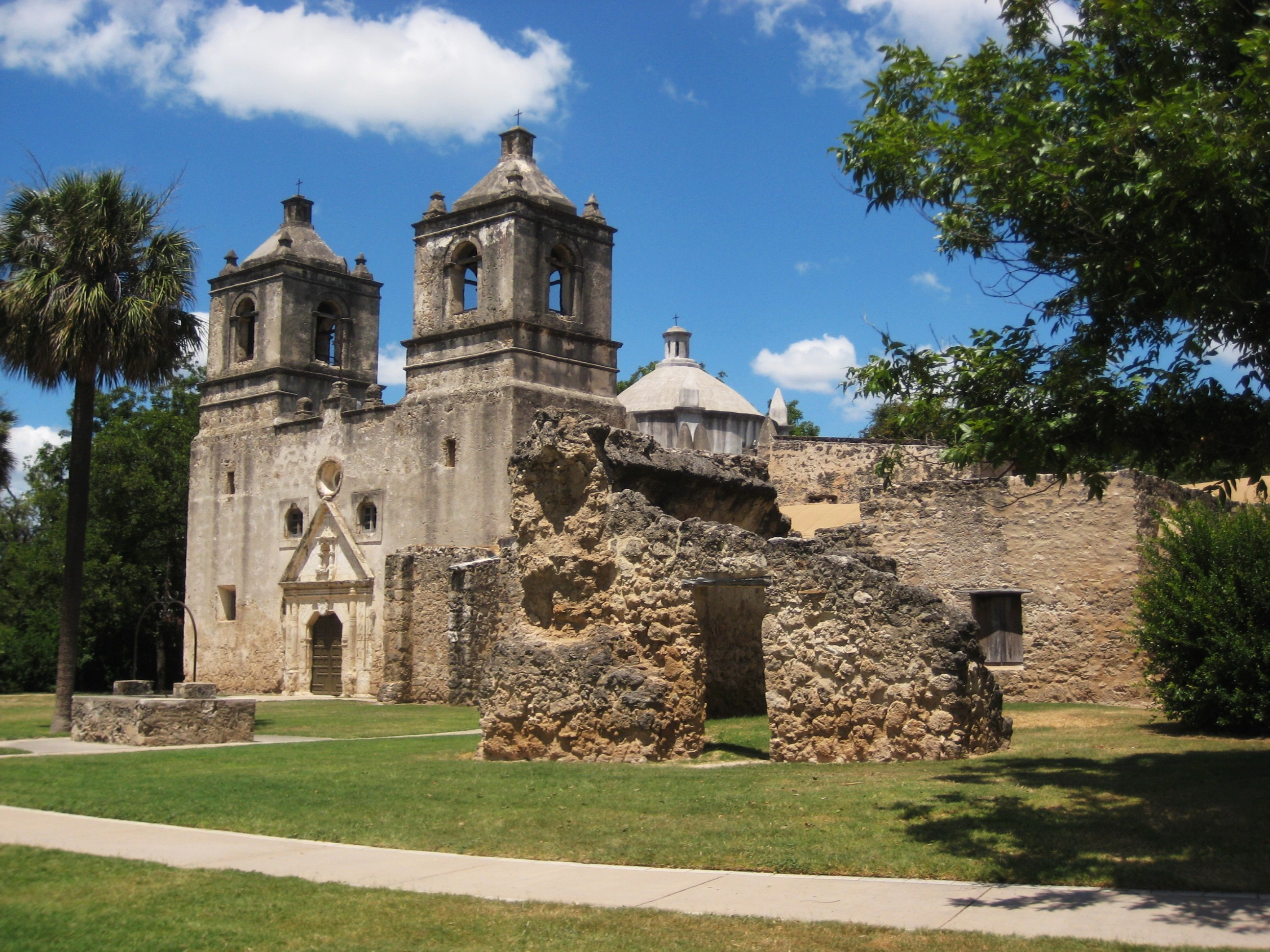
Misión Concepción

Misión Nuestra Señora de la Purísima Concepción de Acuña was established in 1716 as Nuestra Señora de la Purísima Concepción de los Hainais in East Texas. The mission was moved in 1731 to San Antonio. Founded by Franciscan friars, this is the best preserved of the Texas missions. Located at 807 Mission Road, Mission Concepcion was designated a National Historic Landmark on April 15, 1970.

In 2002, Archbishop Patrick Flores appointed Father Jim Rutkowski the archdiocesan administrator of Mission Concepcion. As such, Fr. Rutkowski has been charged with the pastoral duties associated with the operation of the active church congregation. In 2009-10 Las Misiones Foundation began an active, aggressive campaign to restore the interior of the Mission. Restoration of the mission's interior was completed in March 2010 after six months of work. Fr. Rutkowski continues to offer Sunday Mass regularly for the Mission community.

== Mission San José ==
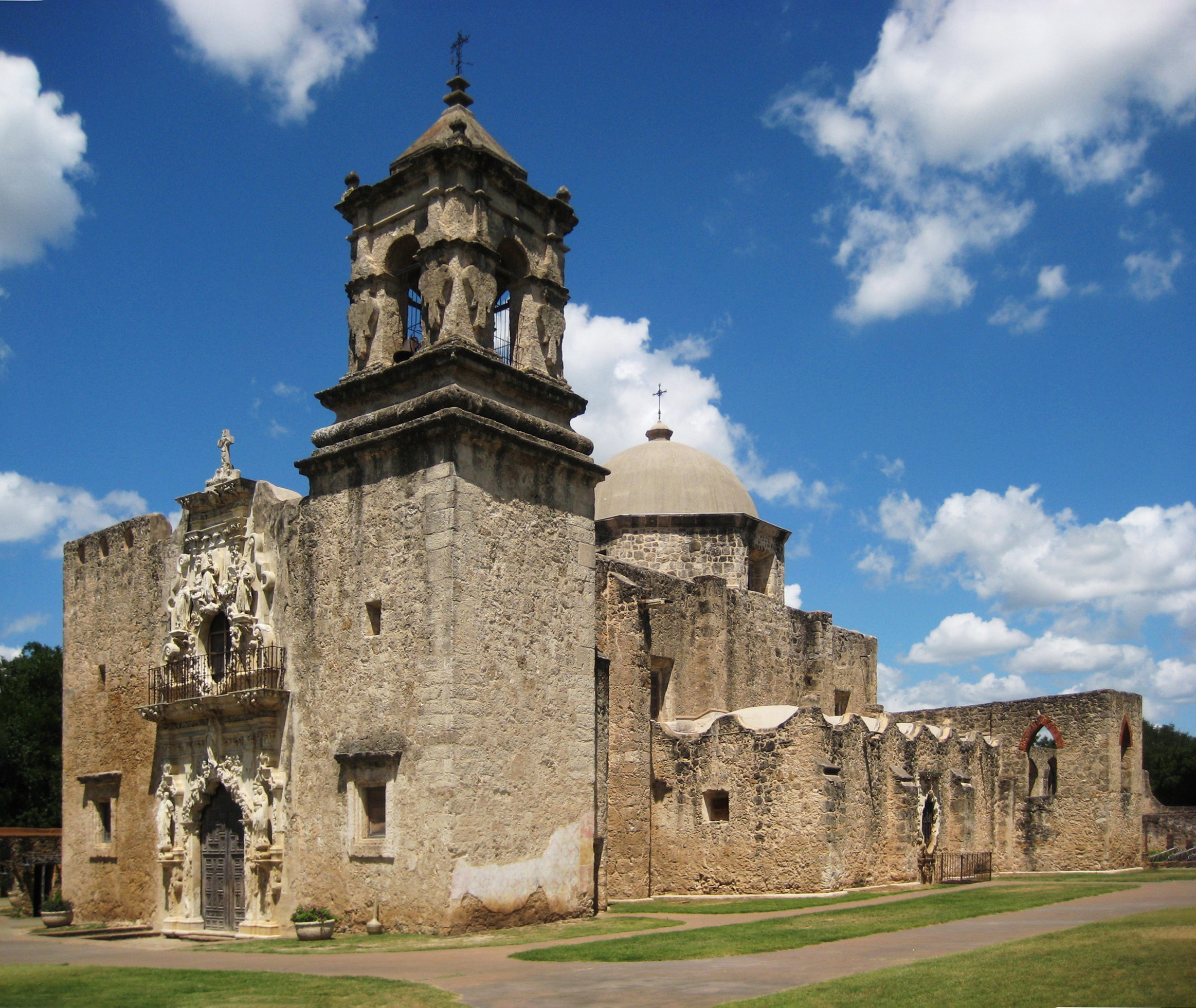
Mission San José y San Miguel de Aguayo.

Misión San José y San Miguel de Aguayo was established in 1720. Located at 6519 San Jose Drive, it was designated the San Jose Mission National Historic Site in 1941. The historic site was administratively listed on the National Register on October 15, 1966. The church, which is still standing, was constructed in 1768. Mission San Jose was founded by Father Antonio Margil.

The park's visitor center is located adjacent.

== Mission San Juan Capistrano ==
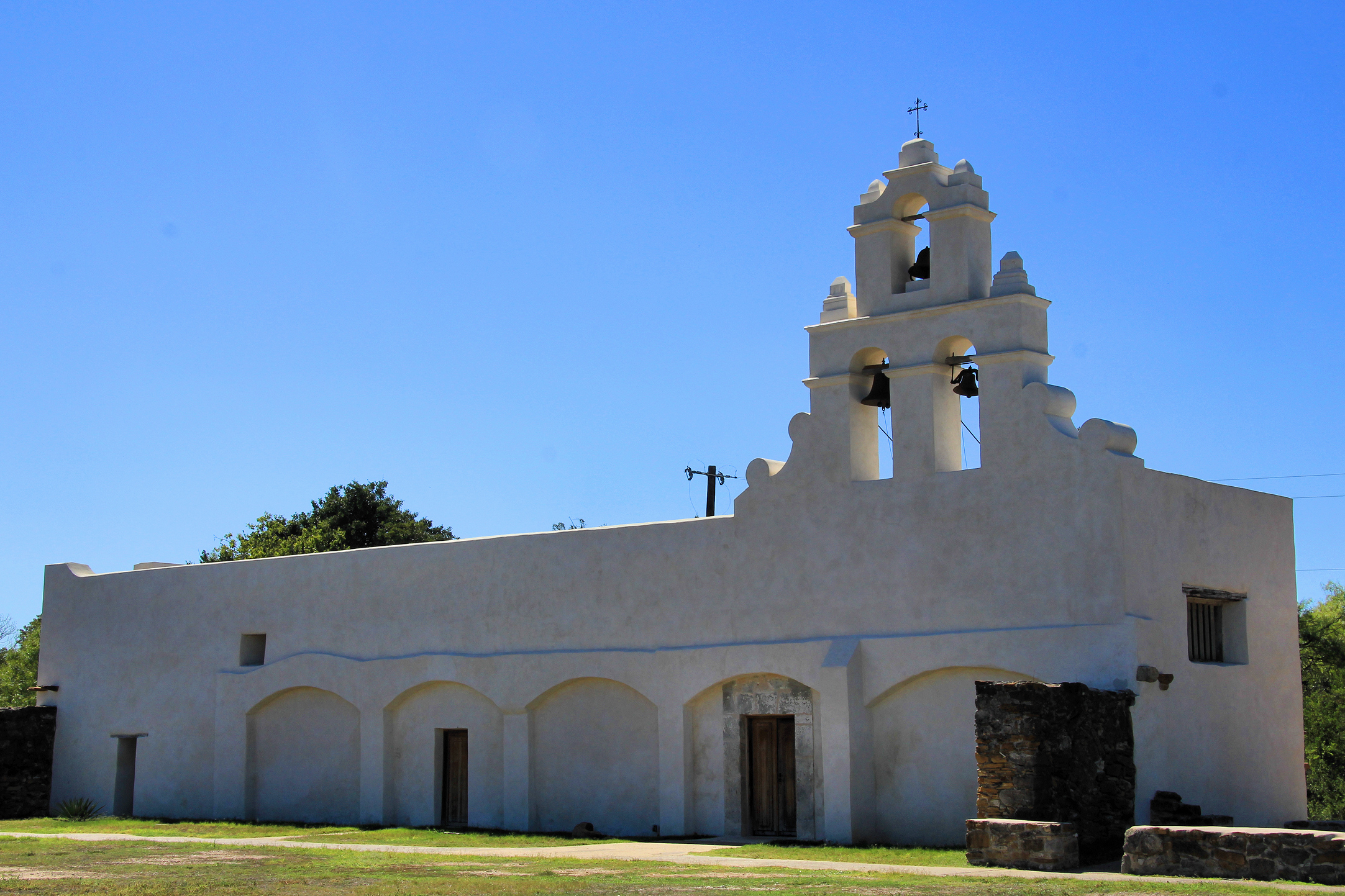
Mission San Juan Capistrano

Misión San Juan Capistrano was established in 1716 as Misión San Jose de los Nazonis in East Texas. The mission was renamed and moved in 1731 to San Antonio. Located on Mission Road, San Juan was listed on the National Register on February 23, 1972.

== Mission Espada ==
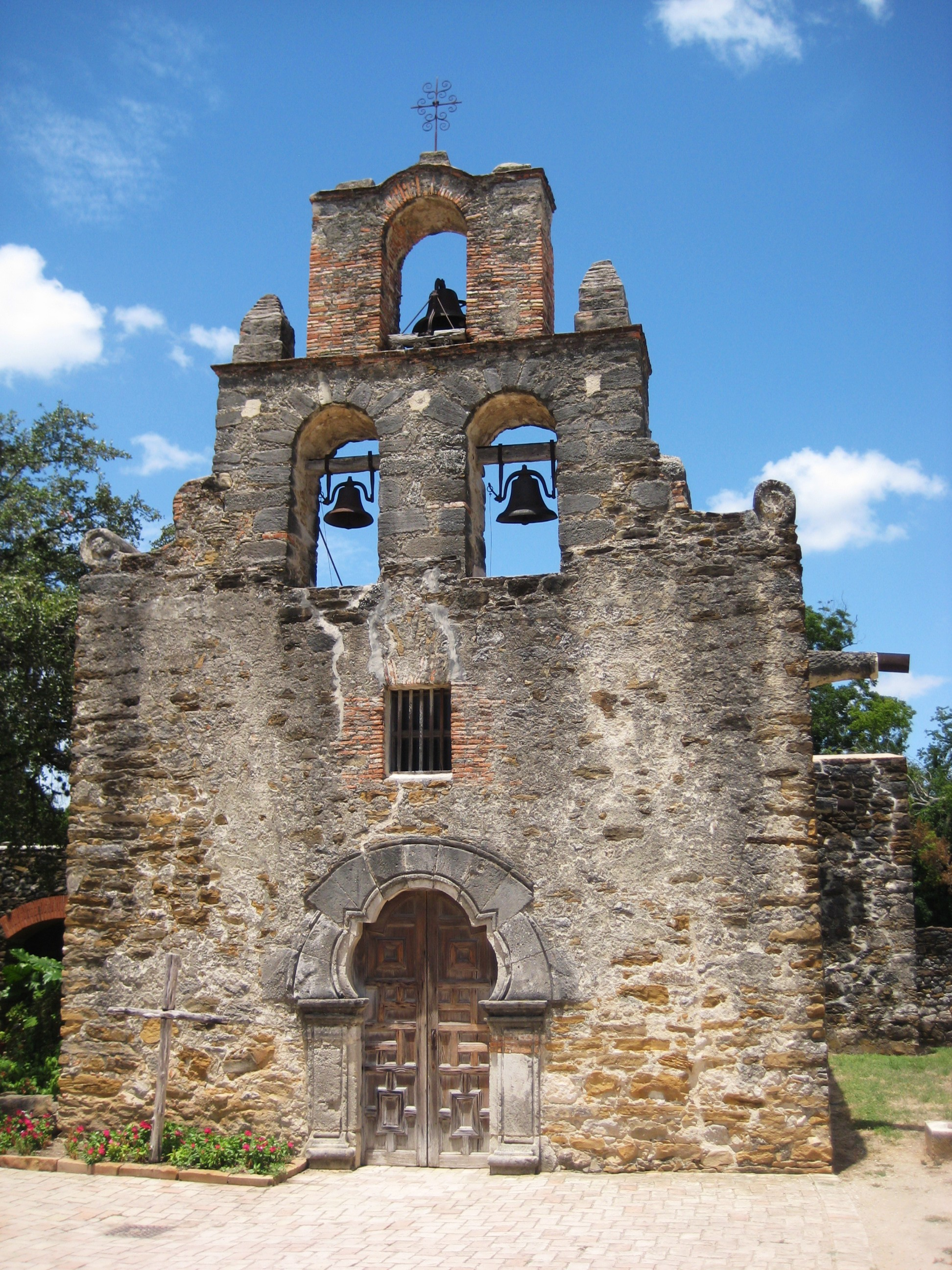
Mission Espada

Misión San Francisco de la Espada was established in 1690 as San Francisco de los Tejas near present-day Augusta. and renamed San Francisco de los Neches in 1721. The mission was moved in 1731 to San Antonio and given its current name. Located on Espada Road, this mission was listed on the National Register of Historic Places on February 23, 1972. The Rancho de las Cabras, located about 22 miles southeast, is under the mission's jurisdiction and provided crops and livestock for it.

== Mission Reach Ecosystem Restoration and Recreation project ==
In October 2013, the Mission Reach Ecosystem Restoration and Recreation project was completed, adding 15 miles of hiking, biking, and paddling trails to the San Antonio Missions. This project connects Mission Concepcion, Mission San Jose, Mission San Juan, and Mission Espada to the San Antonio Riverwalk, through a series of park portals. Visitors can experience the Missions by walking, bicycling, or using San Antonio's new VIVA Culture bus routes.

== Additional locations ==
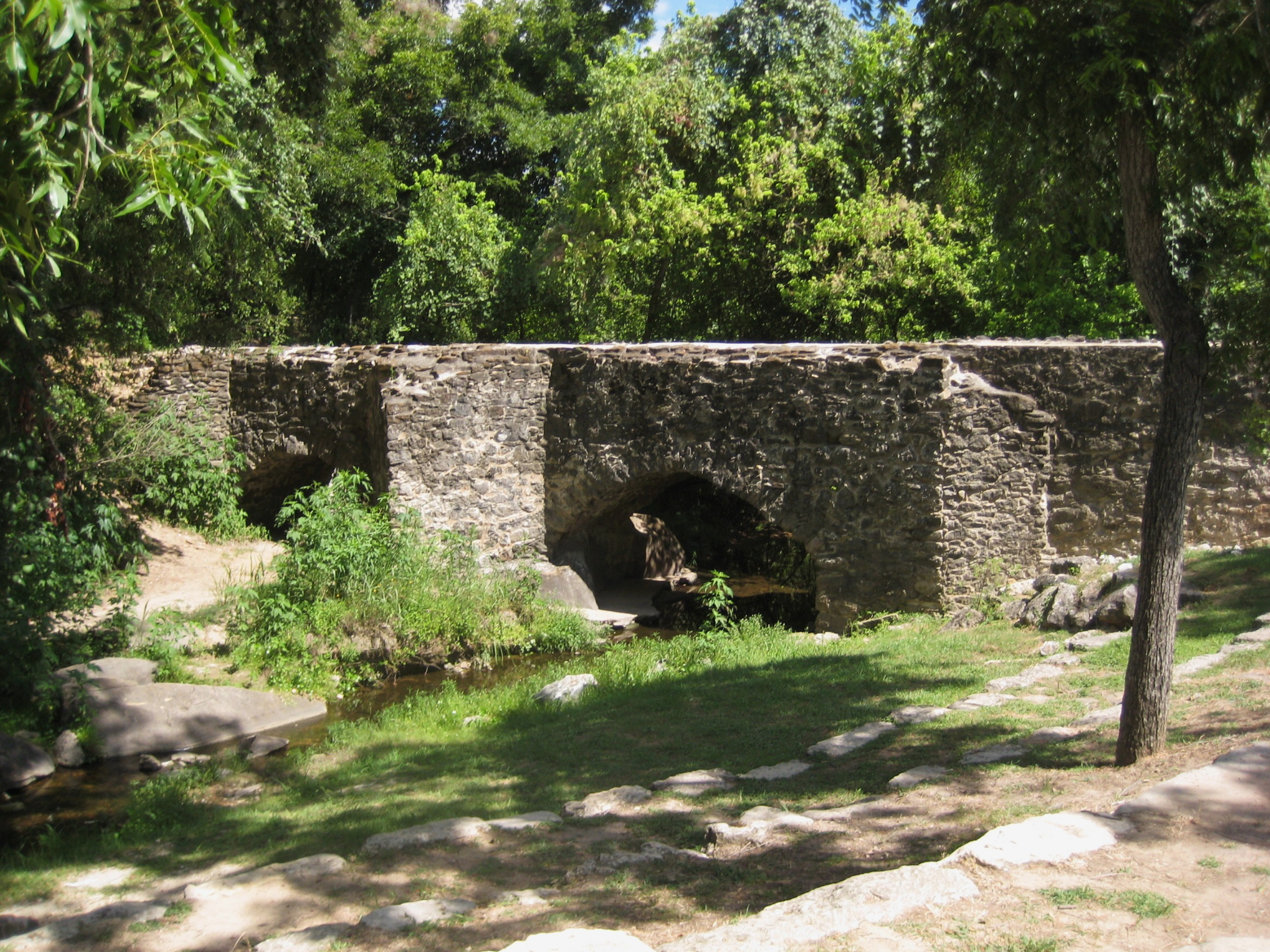
Espada Acequia

The Park includes two other locations listed on the National Register of Historic Places:

- Espada Aqueduct, listed as a National Historic Landmark in 1964
- Ethel Wilson Harris House, listed in 2001

== See also ==
- Acequia Park
- College of Guadalupe de Zacatecas
- College of Santa Cruz de Querétaro
- Spanish missions in Texas
