= Espada Acequia =

Historic aqueduct in San Antonio, Texas

- Espada Aqueduct
- U.S. National Register of Historic Places
- U.S. National Historic Landmark
- U.S. Historic district – Contributing property
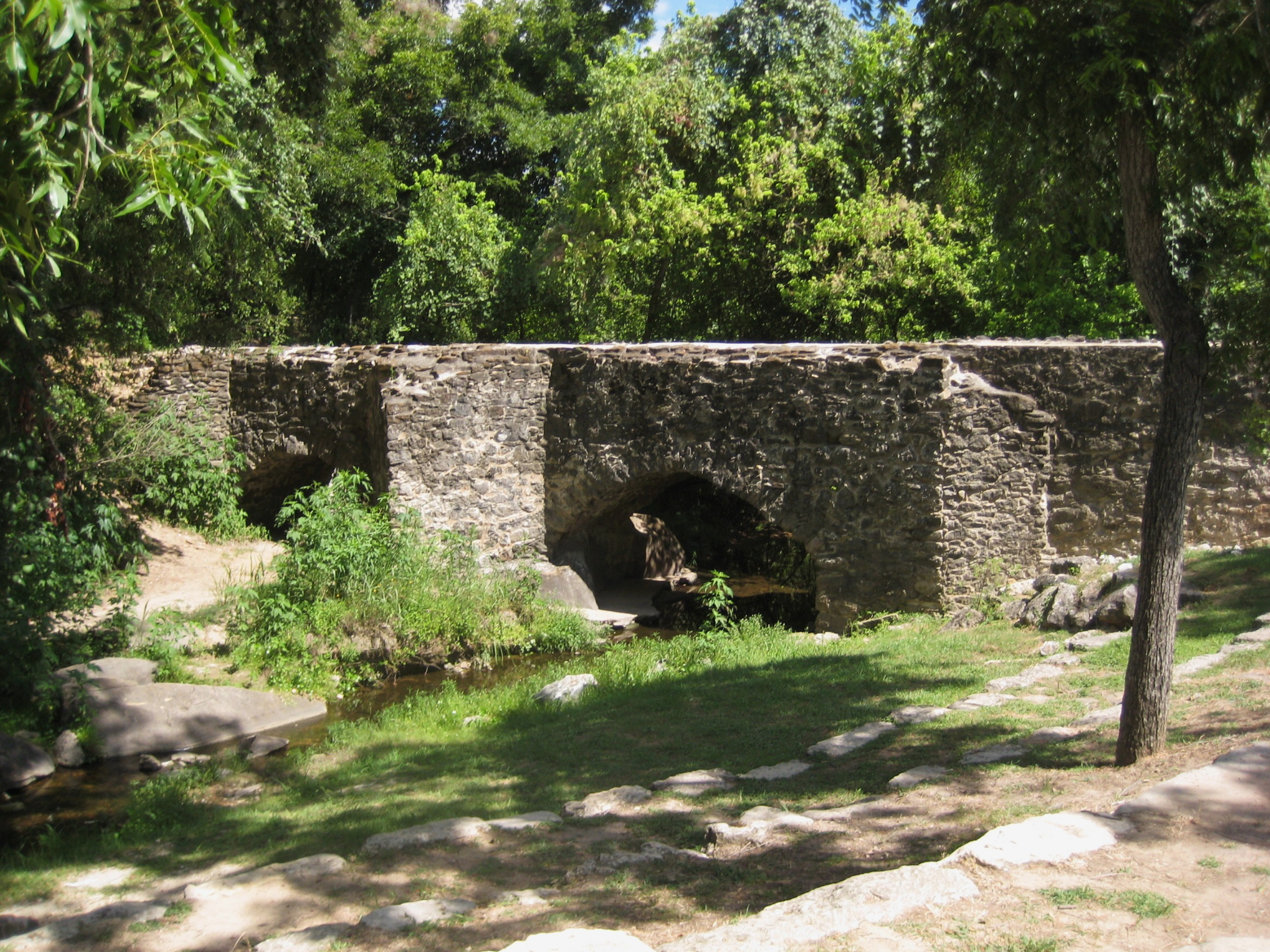
- The Espada aqueduct as it crosses Piedras Creek.

- Location within Texas Location within the United States
- Location: Espada Rd., E of U.S. 281S
- Nearest city: San Antonio, Texas; United States
- Coordinates: 29°18′16.4″N 98°28′10″W
- Built: 1731
- Part of: San Antonio Missions National Historical Park (ID78003147)
- NRHP reference No.: 66000809

Significant dates
- Added to NRHP: October 15, 1966
- Designated NHL: July 19, 1964
- Designated CP: October 6, 1975

The Espada Acequia, or Piedras Creek Aqueduct, was built by Franciscan friars in 1731 in what is now San Antonio, Texas, United States. It was built to supply irrigation water to the lands near Mission San Francisco de la Espada, today part of San Antonio Missions National Historical Park. The acequia is still in use today and is an National Historic Civil Engineering Landmark and a National Historic Landmark.

== Irrigation system ==
Mission Espada's acequia (irrigation) system can still be seen today. The main ditch, or acequia madre, continues to carry water to the mission and its former farmlands. This water is still used by residents living on these neighboring lands.

The initial survival of a new mission depended upon the planting and harvesting of crops. In south central Texas, intermittent rainfall and the need for a reliable water source made the design and installation of an acequia system a high priority. Irrigation was so important to Spanish colonial settlers that they measured cropland in suertes -the amount of land that could be watered in one day.

The use of acequias was originally brought to the arid regions of Spain by the Romans and the Moors. When Franciscan missionaries arrived in the desert Southwest they found the system worked well in the hot, dry environment. In some areas, like New Mexico, it blended in easily with the irrigation system already in use by the Puebloan Native Americans.

In order to distribute water to the missions along the San Antonio River, Franciscan missionaries oversaw the construction of seven gravity-flow ditches, dams, and at least one aqueduct—a 15-mile (24 km) network that irrigated approximately 3,500 acres (14 km^{2}) of land. The acequia not only conducted potable water and irrigation, but also powered a mill.

Mission Espada has survived from its beginnings to the present day as a community center that still supports a Catholic parish and religious education, however a school originally opened by the Sisters of the Incarnate Word and Blessed Sacrament was closed in 1967.
