= Praetorian Building (Waco, Texas) =

- U.S. National Register of Historic Places
- U.S. Historic district – Contributing property
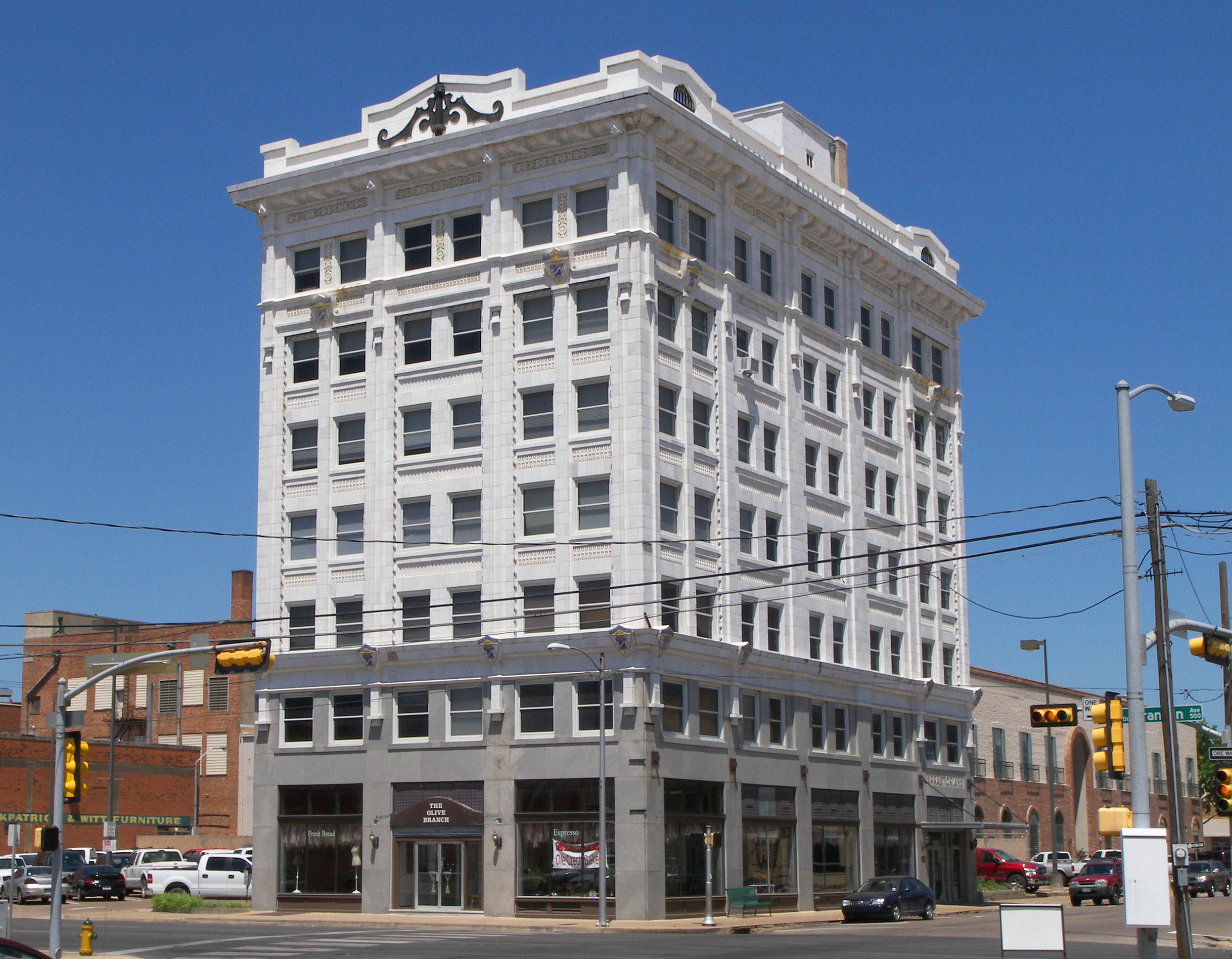
- Praetorian Building in 2009

- Location within Texas Location within the United States
- Location: 601 Franklin Ave., Waco, Texas
- Coordinates: 31°33′18″N 97°7′55″W
- Area: less than one acre
- Built: 1915
- Built by: Hughes O'Rourke Const.
- Architect: C. W. Bulger & Co.
- Architectural style: Chicago
- Part of: Waco Downtown Historic District (ID11001094)
- NRHP reference No.: 84001911

Significant dates
- Added to NRHP: July 26, 1984
- Designated CP: February 3, 2012

The Praetorian Building is a historic 7-story building located at 601 Franklin Avenue in Waco, McLennan County, Texas. Designed by the Dallas architectural firm of C. W. Bulger & Co. in the Chicago school or Modern style of architecture, it was built in 1915 by Hughes O'Rourke Construction to house the Praetorian Insurance Company whose main office, the Praetorian Building in Dallas, had been designed by C. E. Bulger in 1905. Other names the building has borne over the years include the Franklin Tower, Service Mutual Building in 1934, Southwestern Building in 1956 (the year Praetorian sold the building), and Williams Tower from 1989 to 1996. Today, the building houses apartments, retail, and office space.

== See also ==
- National Register of Historic Places listings in McLennan County, Texas
