= History of Texas =

Indigenous people lived in what is now Texas more than 10,000 years ago, as evidenced by the discovery of the remains of prehistoric Leanderthal Lady. In 1519, the arrival of the first Spanish conquistadors in the region of North America now known as Texas found the region occupied by numerous Native American tribes. The name Texas derives from táyshaʼ, a word in the Caddoan language of the Hasinai, which means "friends" or "allies." (Note: Attributed to multiple references:) In the recorded history of what is now the U.S. state of Texas, all or parts of Texas have been claimed by six countries: France, Spain, Mexico, the Republic of Texas, the Confederacy during the Civil War, and the United States of America.

The first European settlement was established in 1681, along the upper Rio Grande river, near modern El Paso. The settlers were exiled Spaniards and Native Americans from the Pueblo of Isleta after the Pueblo Revolt, from Santa Fe de Nuevo México (the northern part of present-day New Mexico). In 1685, Robert de La Salle (1643–1687), established a French colony at Fort Saint Louis, after sailing down and exploring the Mississippi River from New France (modern Canada) and the Great Lakes. He planted this early French presence at Fort Saint Louis near Matagorda Bay, along the Gulf of Mexico coast (near modern Inez, Texas), even before the establishment of New Orleans. The colony was killed off by Native Americans after three years, but Spanish authorities felt pressed to establish settlements to keep their claim to the land. Several Roman Catholic missions were established in East Texas; they were abandoned in 1691. Twenty years later, concerned with the continued French presence in neighboring Louisiana, Spanish authorities again tried to colonize Texas. Over the next 110 years, Spain established numerous villages, presidios, and missions in the province. A small number of Spanish settlers arrived, in addition to missionaries and soldiers. Spain signed agreements with colonists from the United States, bordering the province to the northeast ever since their Louisiana Purchase from the Emperor Napoleon I and his French Empire (France) in 1803. When Mexico won its independence from Spain in 1821, Mexican Texas was part of the new nation. To encourage settlement, Mexican authorities allowed organized immigration from the United States, and by 1834, over 30,000 Anglos lived in Texas, compared to 4,000 Tejanos.

After Santa Anna's dissolution of the Constitution of 1824 and his political shift to a centralized government, issues such as lack of access to courts, the militarization of the region's government (e.g., response to Saltillo-Monclova problem), and self-defense issues resulting in the confrontation in Gonzales, turned public sentiment in Mexican and Anglo Texans towards revolution. Santa Anna's invasion of the territory after putting down the rebellion in Zacatecas provoked conflict in 1836, and between 1835 and 1836, the Texian forces fought and won the Texas Revolution.

Although not recognized as such by Mexico, Texas declared itself an independent nation, the Republic of Texas. Attracted by the rich lands for cotton plantations and ranching, tens of thousands of immigrants arrived from the U.S. and from Germany as well. In 1845, Texas joined the United States, becoming the 28th state, when the United States annexed it. Only after the conclusion of the Mexican–American War, with the Treaty of Guadalupe Hidalgo in 1848, did Mexico recognize Texan independence. Texas declared its secession from the United States in 1861 to join the Confederate States of America. Only a few battles of the American Civil War were fought in Texas; most Texas regiments served in the east. When the war ended, enslaved African Americans were freed after ratification of the Emancipation Proclamation. Texas was subject to Reconstruction after the Civil War was over. Later on, White Democrats gained political dominance and passed laws in the late 19th century creating second-class status for blacks in a Jim Crow system of segregation which included disenfranchising them from voting in 1901 through passage of a poll tax. Black residents were excluded from the formal political system until after passage of federal civil rights legislation in the mid-1960s.

In early Texas statehood, things such as cotton, ranching, and farming dominated the economy, along with railroad construction. After 1870, railroads were a major factor in the development of new cities away from rivers and waterways. Toward the end of the 19th century, timber became an important industry in Texas as well. In 1901, a petroleum discovery at Spindletop Hill, near Beaumont, along with Kilgore, Texas with the discovery of the massive East Texas Oil Field in 1930, developed into the most productive oil well the world had ever seen. The wave of oil speculation and discovery that followed came to be known as the "Texas Oil Boom", permanently transforming and enriching the economy of Texas. Agriculture and ranching gave way to a service-oriented society after the economic boom years of World War II. Segregation would end in the 1960s due to federal legislation. Politically, Texas changed from virtually a one-party Democratic state achieved following disenfranchisement policies, to a highly contested political scene, until the early 1970s when it shifted to becoming solidly Republican. The population of Texas continued to grow rapidly throughout the 20th century, becoming the second-largest state in population in the United States by 1994. Also during the 20th century, the state continued to become economically highly diversified, with a growing economic base in emerging technologies in the 21st century.

== Precontact Indigenous history ==
Texas lies at the juncture of several major cultural areas of Pre-Columbian North America: the Southwestern, Southern Plains, Southeastern Woodlands, and Aridoamerica. Several major precontact groups with ties to Texas, known from Indigenous oral history, linguistics, and archaeology, include:

- Ancestral Pueblo peoples from the upper Rio Grande region, centered west of Texas
- Mound Builders of the Mississippian culture which spread throughout the Mississippi Valley and its tributaries; the Caddo nation are considered among its descendants
- Indigenous peoples of Aridoamerica, with south and western Texas being part of the region of Aridoamerica. Some of these tribes had trade and cultural connections with the more densely populated Mesoamerica in Mexico and Central America. The influence of Teotihuacan, in Mexico, peaked around AD 500 and declined over the 8th to 10th centuries.

The Paleo-Indians who lived in Texas between 9200 and 6000 BC may have links to Clovis and Folsom cultures; these nomadic people hunted mammoths and bison latifrons using atlatls. They extracted Alibates flint from quarries in the panhandle region.

Beginning during the 4th millennium BC, the population of Texas increased despite a changing climate and the extinction of giant mammals. Many pictograms from this era, drawn on the walls of caves or on rocks, are visible in the state, including at Hueco Tanks and Seminole Canyon.

Native Americans in East Texas began to settle in villages shortly after 500 BC, farming and building the first burial mounds. They were influenced by the Mississippian culture, which had major sites throughout the Mississippi basin. In the Trans-Pecos area, populations were influenced by Mogollon culture.

Early Ceramics date back to ca. 500 BC. In Eastern Texas, the Tchefuncte tradition of ceramics flourished from around 500 to 100 BC. Local hunters adopted bows and arrows around the 8th century, replaced the long-distance but less accurate atlatl. Native peoples hunted bison for food, clothing, shelter, and more. They imported obsidian from suppliers in Mexico and the Rocky Mountains.

Territories of some Native American tribes in Texas ~1500CE

After Spanish explorers entered the area, Texas was largely divided between six cultural groups. Caddoan language-speaking peoples occupied the area surrounding the entire length of the Red River, and at the time of European contact, they formed four collective confederacies of the Wichita, Natchitoches, the Hasinai, and the Kadohadocho. Along the Gulf Coast region were the Atakapa tribes. Southward from the Atakapa, along the Gulf Coast to the Rio Grande river, at least one Coahuiltecan tribe (a culture group primarily from Northeast Mexico) was located. The Puebloan peoples, situated largely between the Rio Grande & Pecos river were part of an extensive civilization of tribes that lived in what are now the states of Texas, New Mexico, Colorado & Utah. While the northernmost Ancestral Pueblo groups faced a cultural collapse due to drought, many of the southern tribes survive to the present. North of the Pueblos were the Apache peoples, who included several tribes with distinct languages.

By the late 17th century, in Texas Panhandle region, the Comanches settled and later expanded their territories.

Native Americans determined the fate of European explorers and settlers depending on whether a tribe was kind or warlike. Friendly tribes taught newcomers how to grow indigenous crops, prepare foods, and hunting methods for the wild game. Warlike tribes made life difficult and dangerous for explorers and settlers through their attacks and resistance to European conquest. Many Native Americans died of new infectious diseases, which caused high fatalities and disrupted their cultures in the early years of colonization.

== Early Spanish exploration ==
The first European to see Texas was Alonso Álvarez de Pineda, who led an expedition for the governor of Jamaica, Francisco de Garay, in 1520. While searching for a passage between the Gulf of Mexico and Asia, Álvarez de Pineda created the first map of the northern Gulf Coast. This map is the earliest recorded document of Texas history.

Between 1528 and 1535, four survivors of the Narváez expedition, including Álvar Núñez Cabeza de Vaca and Estevanico, spent six and a half years in Texas as slaves and traders among various native groups. Cabeza de Vaca was the first European to explore the interior of Texas.

In 1543, the Hernando de Soto expedition entered Texas from the east, becoming the first Europeans to visit the Caddo peoples. Searching for an overland path to Mexico, the expedition turned back to the Mississippi River after leaving Caddo territory and finding nomadic tribes without food stores to sustain the Spanish.

== French colonization of Texas (1684–1689) ==
The French flag of the Bourbons

French Texas in 1685 consisted of Fort St. Louis on Matagorda Bay.

Although Álvarez de Pineda had claimed the area that is now Texas for Spain, the area was essentially ignored for over 160 years. Its initial settlement by Europeans occurred by accident. In April 1682, French nobleman René-Robert Cavelier, Sieur de La Salle had claimed the entire Mississippi River Valley for France. The following year, he convinced King Louis XIV to establish a colony near the Mississippi, essentially splitting Spanish Florida from New Spain.

La Salle's colonization expedition left France on July 24, 1684, and soon lost one of its supply ships to Spanish privateers. A combination of inaccurate maps, La Salle's previous miscalculation of the latitude of the mouth of the Mississippi River, and overcorrecting for the Gulf currents led the ships to be unable to find the Mississippi. Instead, they landed at Matagorda Bay in early 1685, 400 miles (644 km) west of the Mississippi. In February, the colonists constructed Fort Saint Louis.

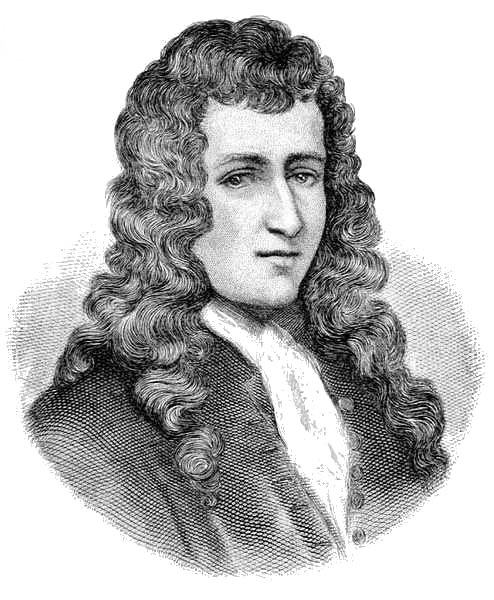
René-Robert Cavelier, Sieur de La Salle founded the French colony in Texas.

After the fort was constructed, one of the ships returned to France, and the other two were soon destroyed in storms, stranding the settlers. La Salle and his party searched overland for the Mississippi River, traveling as far west as the Rio Grande and as far east as the Trinity River. Disease and hardship laid waste to the colony, and by early January 1687, fewer than 45 people remained. That month, a third expedition launched a final attempt to find the Mississippi. The expedition experienced much infighting, and La Salle was ambushed and killed somewhere in East Texas.

The Spanish learned of the French colony in late 1685. Feeling that the French colony was a threat to Spanish mines and shipping routes, King Carlos II's Council of war recommended the removal of "this thorn which has been thrust into the heart of America. The greater the delay the greater the difficulty of attainment." Having no idea where to find La Salle, the Spanish launched ten expeditions—both land and sea—over the next three years. The last expedition discovered a French deserter living in Southern Texas with the Coahuiltecans.

The Frenchman guided the Spanish to the French fort in late April 1689. The fort and the five crude houses surrounding it were in ruins. Several months before, the Karankawa had become angry that the French had taken their canoes without payment and had attacked the settlement sparing only four children.

== Spanish Texas (1690–1821) ==
The Spanish flag of Burgundy.

=== Establishment of Spanish colony ===
News of the destruction of the French fort "created instant optimism and quickened religious fervor" in Mexico City. Spain had learned a great deal about the geography of Texas during the many expeditions in search of Fort Saint Louis. In March 1690, Alonso De León led an expedition to establish a mission in East Texas. Mission San Francisco de los Tejas was completed near the Hasinai village of Nabedaches in late May, and its first mass was celebrated on June 1.

On January 23, 1691, Spain appointed the first governor of Texas, General Domingo Terán de los Ríos. On his visit to Mission San Francisco in August, he discovered that the priests had established a second mission nearby, but were having little luck converting the natives to Christianity. The Indians regularly stole the mission cattle and horses and showed little respect to the priests. When Terán left Texas later that year, most of the missionaries chose to return with him, leaving only three religious people and nine soldiers at the missions. The group also left behind a smallpox epidemic. The angry Caddo threatened the remaining Spaniards, who soon abandoned the fledgling missions and returned to Coahuila. For the next 20 years, Spain again ignored Texas.

After a failed attempt to convince Spanish authorities to reestablish missions in Texas, in 1711 Franciscan missionary Francisco Hidalgo approached the French governor of Louisiana for help. The French governor sent representatives to meet with Hidalgo. This concerned Spanish authorities, who ordered the reoccupation of Texas as a buffer between New Spain and French settlements in Louisiana. In 1716, four missions and a presidio were established in East Texas. Accompanying the soldiers were the first recorded female settlers in Spanish Texas.

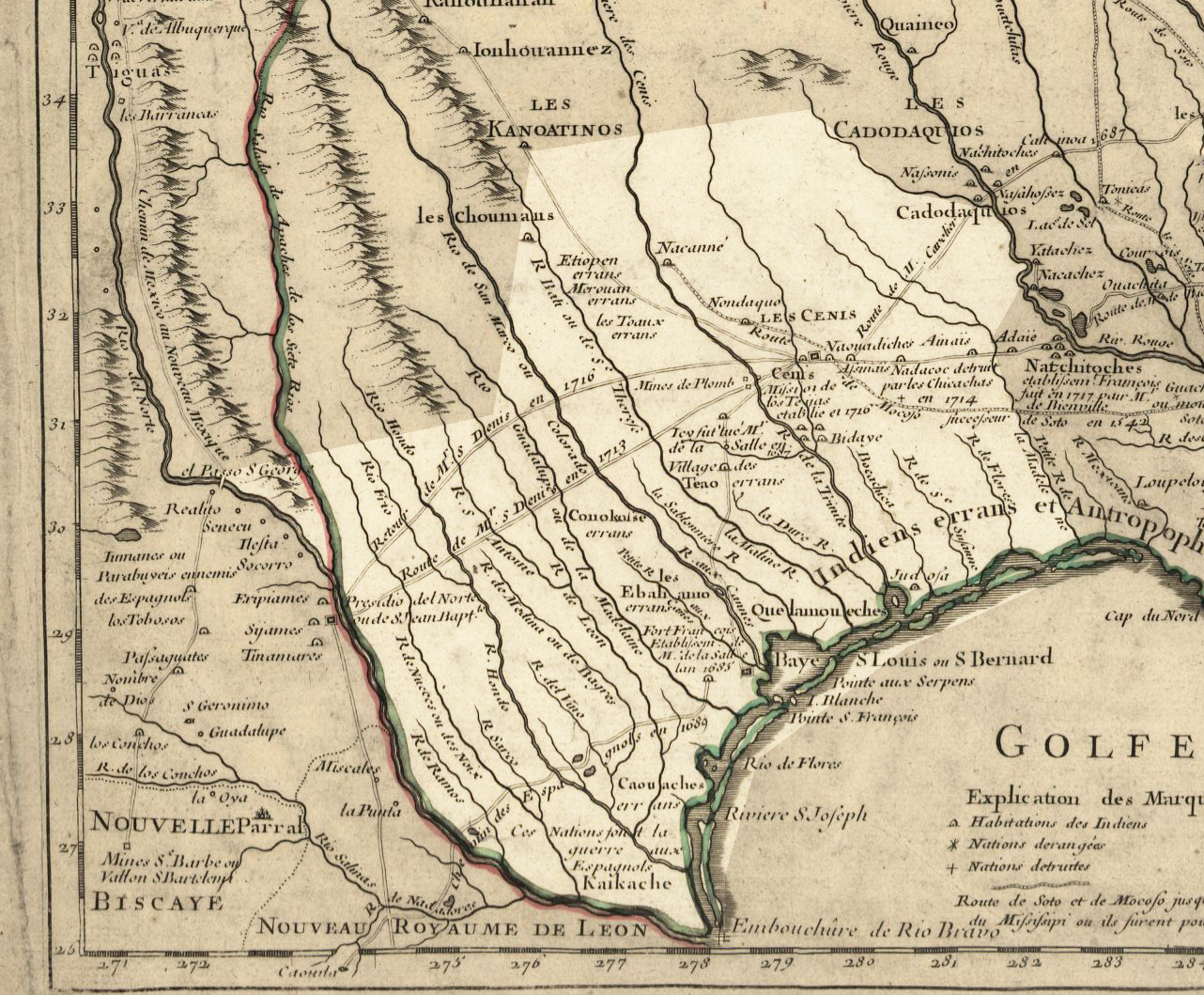
Texas in 1718, Guillaume de L'Isle map, approximate state area highlighted, northern boundary was indefinite.

The new missions were over 400 miles (644 km) from the nearest Spanish settlement, San Juan Bautista. Martín de Alarcón, who had been appointed governor of Texas in late 1716, wished to establish a way station between the settlements along the Rio Grande and the new missions in East Texas. Alarcón led a group of 72 people, including 10 families, into Texas in April 1718, where they settled along the San Antonio River. Within the next week, the settlers built mission San Antonio de Valero and a presidio, and chartered the municipality of San Antonio de Béxar, now San Antonio, Texas.

The following year, the War of the Quadruple Alliance pitted Spain against France, which immediately moved to take over Spanish interests in North America. In June 1719, seven Frenchmen from Natchitoches took control of the mission San Miguel de los Adaes from its sole defender, who did not know that the countries were at war. The French soldiers explained that 100 additional soldiers were coming, and the Spanish colonists, missionaries, and remaining soldiers fled to San Antonio.

The new governor of Coahuila and Texas, the Marquis de San Miguel de Aguayo, drove the French from Los Adaes without firing a shot. He then ordered the building of a new Spanish fort Nuestra Señora del Pilar de Los Adaes, located near present-day Robeline, Louisiana, only 12 mi (19 km) from Natchitoches. The new fort became the first capital of Texas, and was guarded by six cannons and 100 soldiers. The six East Texas missions were reopened, and an additional mission and presidio were established at Matagorda Bay on the former site of Fort Saint Louis.

=== Difficulties with the Native Americans ===
In the late 1720s, the viceroy of New Spain closed the presidio in East Texas and reduced the size of the garrisons at the remaining presidios, leaving only 144 soldiers in the entire province. With no soldiers to protect them, the East Texas missions relocated to San Antonio.

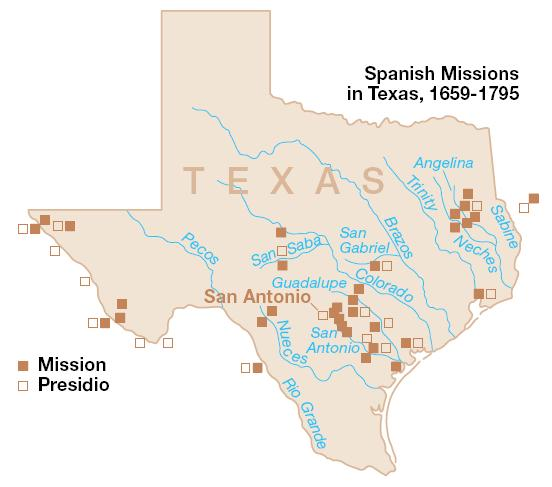
Spanish missions within the boundaries of what is now the state of Texas.

Although the missionaries had been unable to convert the Hasinai tribe of East Texas, they did become friendly with the natives. The Hasinai were bitter enemies of the Lipan Apache, who transferred their enmity to Spain and began raiding San Antonio and other Spanish areas. A temporary peace was finally negotiated with the Apache in 1749, and at the request of the Indians a mission was established along the San Saba River northwest of San Antonio. The Apaches shunned the mission, but the fact that Spaniards now appeared to be friends of the Apache angered the Apache enemies, primarily the Comanche, Tonkawa, and Hasinai tribes, who promptly destroyed the mission.

In 1762, France finally relinquished their claim to Texas by ceding all of Louisiana west of the Mississippi River to Spain as part of the treaty to end the Seven Years' War. Spain saw no need to continue to maintain settlements near French outposts and ordered the closure of Los Adaes, making San Antonio the new provincial capital. The residents of Los Adaes were relocated in 1773. After several attempts to settle in other parts of the province, the residents returned to East Texas without authorization and founded Nacogdoches.

The Comanche agreed to a peace treaty in 1785. The Comanche were willing to fight the enemies of their new friends, and soon attacked the Karankawa. Over the next several years the Comanche killed many of the Karankawa in the area and drove the others into Mexico.

Spanish Texas in 1794

In January 1790, the Comanche also helped the Spanish fight a large battle against the Mescalero and Lipan Apaches at Soledad Creek west of San Antonio. The Apaches were resoundingly defeated and the majority of the raids stopped. By the end of the 18th century, only a small number of the remaining hunting and gathering tribes within Texas had not been Christianized. In 1793, mission San Antonio de Valero was secularized, and the following year the four remaining missions at San Antonio were partially secularized.

=== Encroachment ===
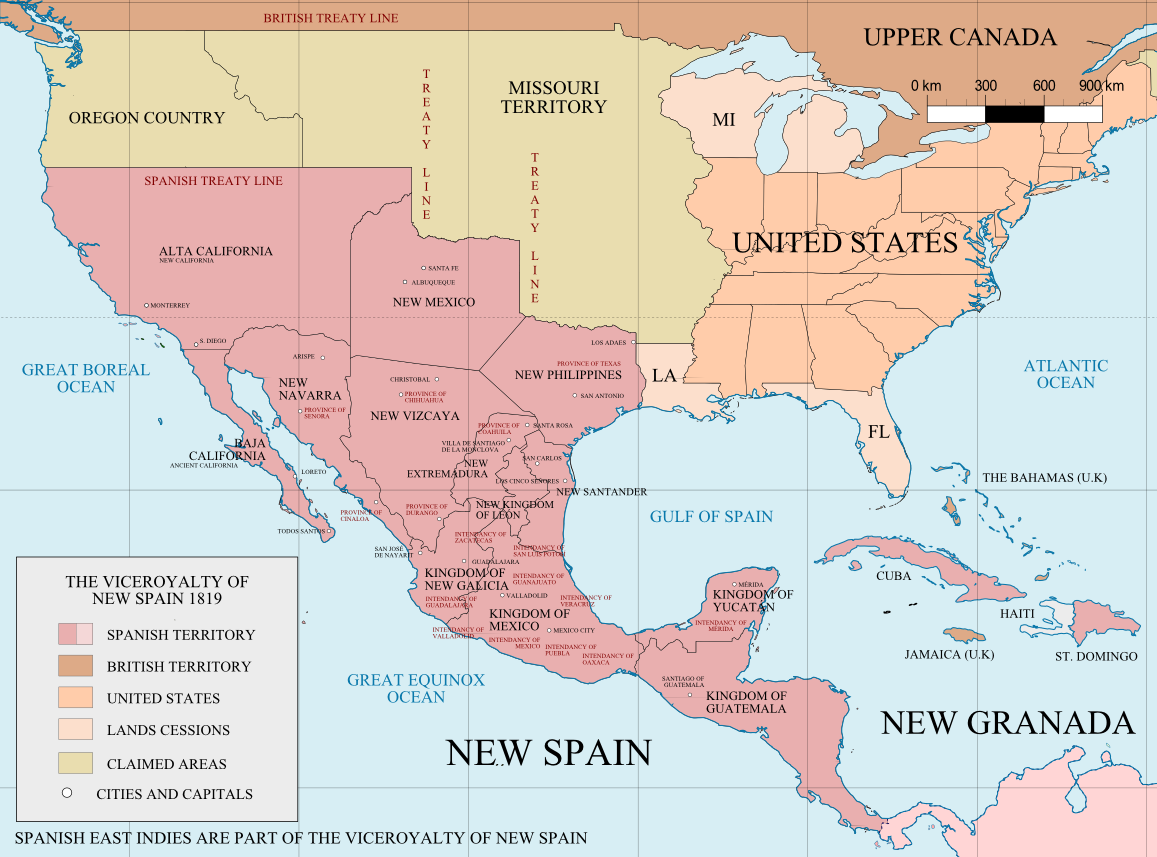
The Viceroyalty of New Spain in 1819

During the American Revolution, Texas and the Tejanos helped the Americans in the fights in British West Florida. Unlike East Florida, Texas supported U.S. independence by also fighting in New Orleans and other campaigns in the Gulf of Mexico.

In 1799, Spain gave Louisiana back to France in exchange for the promise of a throne in central Italy. Although the agreement was signed on October 1, 1800, it did not go into effect until 1802. The following year, Napoleon sold Louisiana to the United States. The original agreement between Spain and France had not explicitly specified the borders of Louisiana, and the descriptions in the documents were ambiguous and contradictory. The United States insisted that its purchase also included most of West Florida and all of Texas.

Thomas Jefferson claimed that Louisiana stretched west to the Rocky Mountains and included the entire watershed of the Mississippi and Missouri Rivers and their tributaries, and that the southern border was the Rio Grande. Spain maintained that Louisiana extended only as far as Natchitoches, and that it did not include the Illinois Territory. Texas was again considered a buffer province, this time between New Spain and the United States. The disagreement would continue until the signing of the 1819 Adams–Onís Treaty, at which point Spain gave Florida to the United States in return for undisputed control of Texas.

During much of the dispute with the United States, governance of New Spain was in question. In 1808, Napoleon forced the Spanish king to abdicate the throne and appointed his brother Joseph Bonaparte as the new monarch. A shadow government operated out of Cadiz during Joseph's reign. Revolutionaries within Mexico and the United States unsuccessfully combined to declare Texas and Mexico independent.

Spanish troops reacted harshly, looting the province and executing any Tejanos accused of having Republican tendencies. By 1820 fewer than 2,000 Hispanic citizens remained in Texas. The situation did not normalize until 1821, when Agustin de Iturbide launched a drive for Mexican Independence. Texas became a part of the newly independent nation without any violence or physical conflict, ending the period of Spanish Texas.

=== Spanish legacy ===
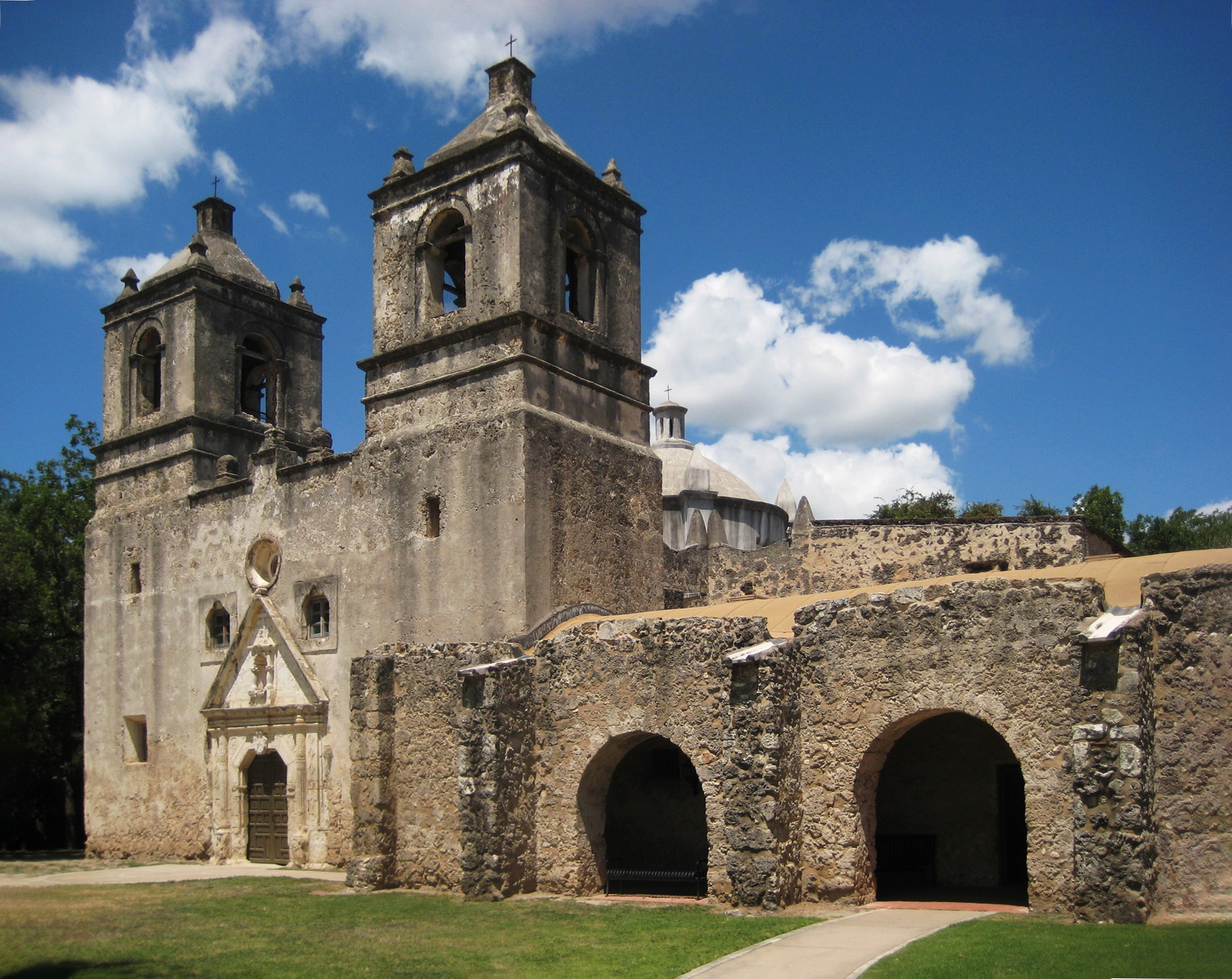
Mission Concepcion is one of the San Antonio missions which is part of a National Historic Landmark.

Spanish control of Texas was followed by Mexican control of Texas, and it can be difficult to separate the Spanish and Mexican influences on the future state. The most obvious legacy is that of the language; every major river in modern Texas, including the Red River, which was baptized by the Spaniards as Colorado de Texas, has a Spanish or Anglicized name, as do 42 of the state's 254 counties. Numerous towns also bear Spanish names.

An additional obvious legacy is that of Roman Catholicism. At the end of Spain's reign over Texas virtually all people living there were members of the Roman Catholic church, and Roman Catholicism is still the primary religion there today. The Spanish missions built in San Antonio to convert Indians to Catholicism have been restored and are a National Historic Landmark.

The Spanish introduced European livestock, including cattle, horses, and mules, to Texas as early as the 1690s. These herds grazed heavily on the native grasses, allowing mesquite, which was native to the lower Texas coast, to spread inland. Spanish farmers also introduced tilling and irrigation to the land, further changing the landscape.

Texas eventually adopted much of the Anglo-American legal system, but some Spanish legal practices were retained, including homestead exemption, community property, and adoption.

== Comancheria ==
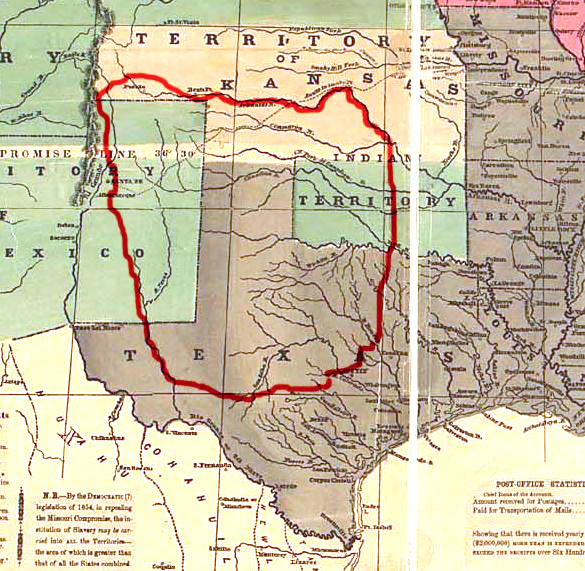
Comancheria before 1850.

From the 1750s to the 1850s, the Comanche were the dominant group in the Southwest, and the domain they ruled was known as Comancheria. Confronted with Spanish, Mexican, and American outposts on their periphery in New Mexico, Texas, and Coahuila and Nueva Vizcaya in northern Mexico, the Comanche worked to increase their own safety, prosperity and power. The population in 1810–1830 was 7,000 to 8,000.

The Comanche used their military power to obtain supplies and labor from the Americans, Mexicans, and Indians through thievery, looting and killing, tribute, and kidnappings. There was much violence committed by and against Comanche, before and after the European settlement of Texas. Although they made a living partially through raiding and violence, along with hunting and gathering, especially buffalo hunting, the Comanche empire also supported a commercial network with long-distance trade. Dealing with subordinate Indians, the Comanche spread their language and culture across the region. In terms of governance, the Comanche were made up of allied bands with a loosely hierarchical social organization within bands.

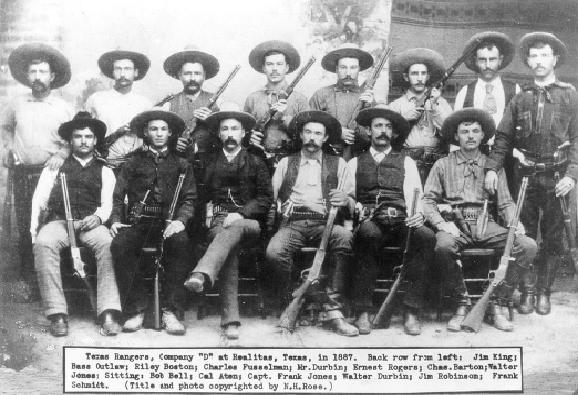
Company D, Texas Rangers, at Realitos in 1887

Their empire collapsed when their camps and villages were repeatedly decimated by epidemics of smallpox and cholera in the late 1840s, and in bloody conflict with settlers, the Texas Rangers, and the U.S. Army. The population plunged from 20,000 to just a few thousand by the 1870s. The Comanche were no longer able to deal with the U.S. Army, which took control of the region after the Mexican–American War ended in 1848. The long-term imprint of the Comanche on the native and Hispanic culture has been demonstrated by scholars such as Daniel J. Gelo and Curtis Marez.

== Mexican Texas (1821–1836) ==
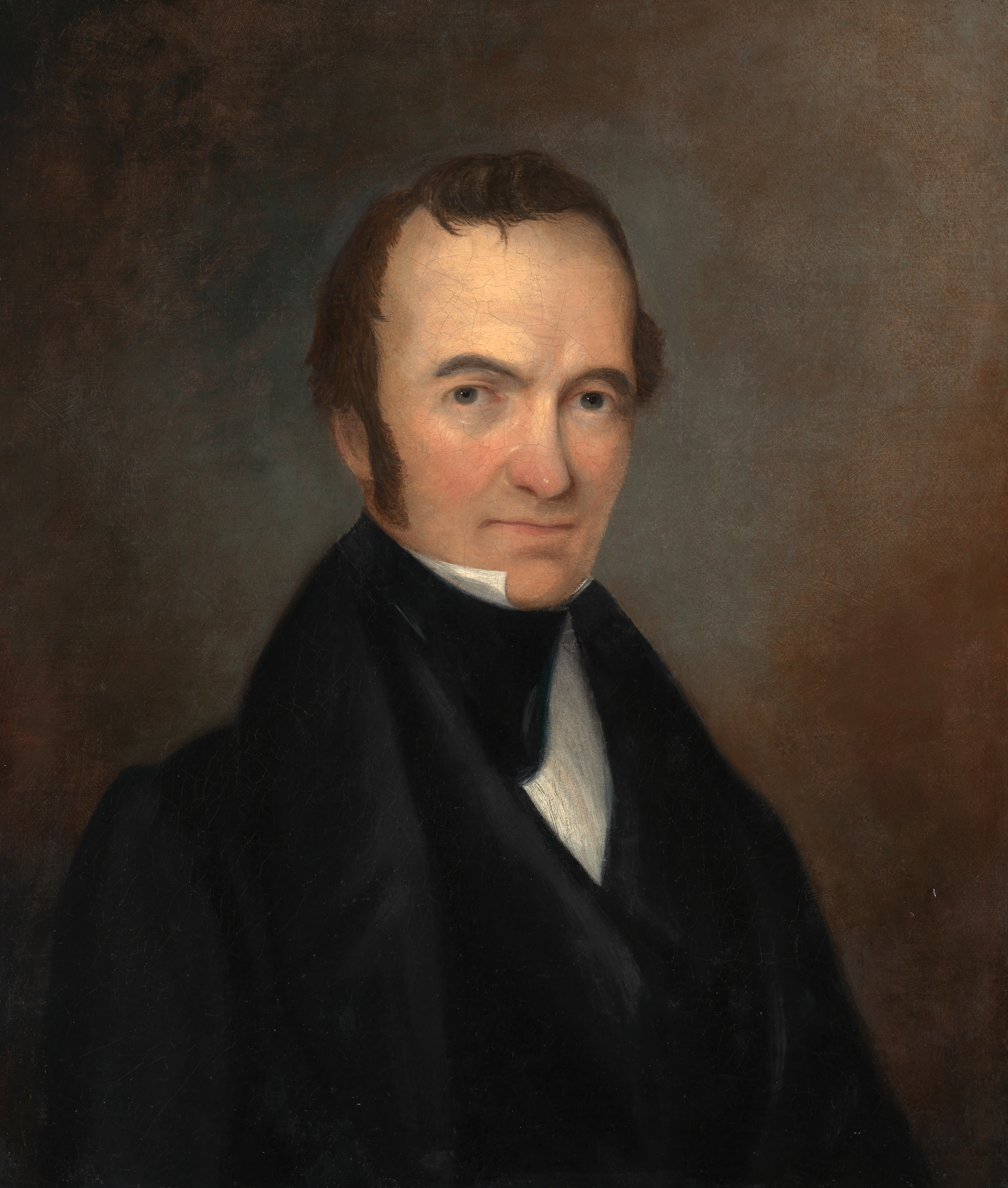
Stephen F. Austin, known as the "Father of Texas."

In 1821, the Mexican War for Independence severed the control that Spain had exercised on its North American territories, and the new country of Mexico was formed from much of the lands that had comprised New Spain, including Spanish Texas. The 1824 Constitution of Mexico joined Texas with Coahuila to form the state of Coahuila y Tejas. The Congress did allow Texas the option of forming its own state "as soon as it feels capable of doing so."

The same year, Mexico enacted the General Colonization Law, which enabled all heads of household, regardless of race or immigrant status, to claim land in Mexico. Mexico had neither manpower nor funds to protect settlers from near-constant Comanche raids and it hoped that getting more settlers into the area could control the raids. The government liberalized its immigration policies, allowing for settlers from the United States to immigrate to Texas.

The German settlement in Mexico goes back to the times they settled Texas when it was under Spanish rule, but the first permanent settlement of Germans was at Industry, in Austin County, established by Friedrich Ernst and Charles Fordtran in the early 1830s, then under Mexican rule. Ernst wrote a letter to a friend in his native Oldenburg, which was published in the newspaper there. His description of Texas was so influential in attracting German immigrants to that area that he is remembered as "the Father of German Immigration to Texas." Many Germans, especially Roman Catholics who sided with Mexico, left Texas for the rest of present-day Mexico after the U.S. defeated Mexico in the Mexican–American War in 1848. A few Mexican Irish communities existed in Mexican Texas until the Texas Revolution. Many Irish then sided with Catholic Mexico against Protestant pro-U.S. elements.

The first empresarial grant had been made under Spanish control to Moses Austin. The grant was passed to his son Stephen F. Austin, whose settlers, known as the Old Three Hundred, settled along the Brazos River in 1822. The grant was later ratified by the Mexican government. Twenty-three other empresarios brought settlers to the state, the majority from the United States of America.

Starting in 1821, and in spite of growing Mexican limitations on slavery, U.S. immigrants brought an increasing number of slaves into Texas. By 1825, 69 slave owners owned 443 slaves. Mexico granted Texas a one-year exemption from the national edict of 1829 outlawing slavery, but Mexican president Anastasio Bustamante ordered that all slaves be freed in 1830. To circumvent the law, the colonists converted their slaves into indentured servants "for life." By 1836 there were 5,000 enslaved African Americans in Texas.

Bustamante outlawed the immigration of United States citizens to Texas in 1830. Several new presidios were established in the region to monitor immigration and customs practices. The new laws also called for the enforcement of customs duties, angering both native Mexican citizens (Tejanos) and Anglos. In 1832, a group of settlers in East Texas led a revolt against customs enforcement in Anahuac. These Anahuac Disturbances coincided with a revolt in Mexico against the current president. Texans sided with the federalists against the current government and after the Battle of Nacogdoches, drove all Mexican soldiers out of East Texas.

Mexican Texas in 1833

Texans took advantage of the lack of oversight to agitate for more political freedom, resulting in the Convention of 1832. Among other issues, the convention demanded that U.S. citizens be allowed to immigrate into Texas, and requested independent statehood for the area. The following year, Texians reiterated their demands at the Convention of 1833. After presenting their petition, courier Stephen F. Austin was jailed for the next two years in Mexico City on suspicion of treason. Although Mexico implemented several measures to appease the colonists, President Antonio Lopez de Santa Anna's measures to transform Mexico from a federalist to a centralist state led the Texan colonists to revolt.

=== Texas Revolution ===
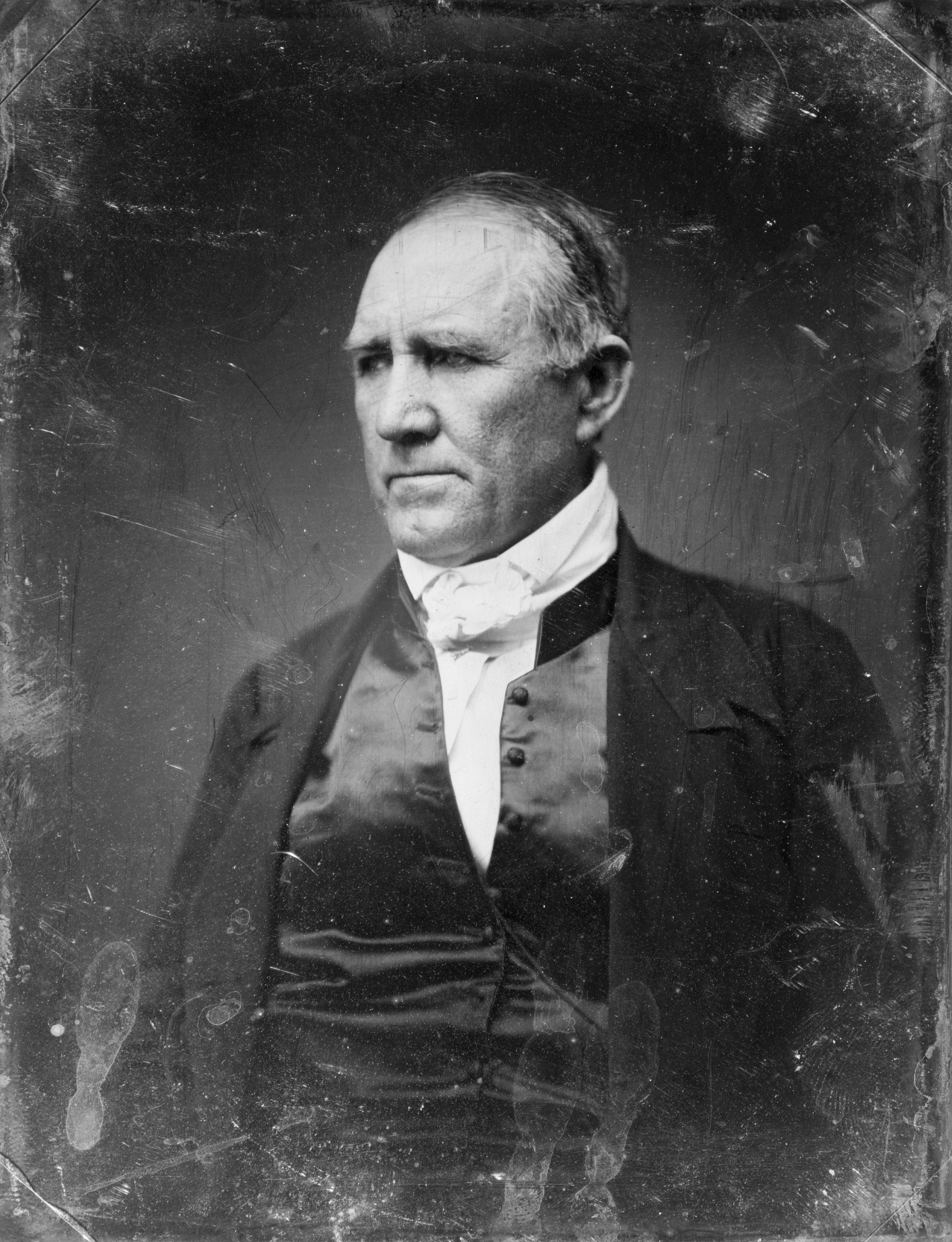
Sam Houston served as the first and third president of the Republic of Texas and seventh governor of Texas.

The vague unrest erupted into armed conflict on October 2, 1835, at the Battle of Gonzales, when Texans repelled a Mexican attempt to retake a small cannon. This launched the Texas Revolution, and over the next three months, the Texian Army successfully defeated all Mexican troops in the region.

On March 2, 1836, Texans signed the Texas Declaration of Independence at Washington-on-the-Brazos, effectively creating the Republic of Texas. The revolt was justified as necessary to protect basic rights and because Mexico had annulled the federal pact. The majority of the colonists were from the United States; they said that Mexico had invited them to move to the country, but they were determined "to enjoy" the republican institutions to which they were accustomed in their native land.

Many of the Texas settlers believed the war to be over and left the army after the initial string of victories. The remaining troops were largely recently arrived adventurers from the United States; according to historian Alwyn Barr, the numerous American volunteers "contributed to the Mexican view that Texan opposition stemmed from outside influences." The Mexican congress responded to this perceived threat by authorizing the execution of any foreigner found fighting in Texas; they did not want prisoners of war.

As early as October 27, Mexican president Antonio Lopez de Santa Anna had been preparing to quell the unrest in Texas. In early 1836, Santa Anna personally led a 6,000-man force toward Texas. His force was large but ill-trained. Santa Anna led the bulk of the troops to San Antonio de Bexar to besiege the Alamo Mission, while General Jose de Urrea led the remaining troops up the coast of Texas. Urrea's forces soon defeated all the Texian resistance along the coast, culminating in the Goliad massacre, where they executed 300 Texian prisoners of war. After a thirteen-day siege, Santa Anna's forces overwhelmed the nearly 200 Texians defending the Alamo, and killed the prisoners. "Remember the Alamo! Remember Goliad!" became a battle cry of the Texas Revolution.

News of the defeats sparked the Runaway Scrape, where much of the population of Texas and the Texas provisional government fled east, away from the approaching Mexican army. Many settlers rejoined the Texian army, then commanded by General Sam Houston. After several weeks of maneuvering, on April 21, 1836, the Texian Army attacked Santa Anna's forces near the present-day city of Houston at the Battle of San Jacinto. They captured Santa Anna and forced him to sign the Treaties of Velasco, ending the war.

== Republic of Texas (1836–1845) ==
The Republic of Texas. The present-day outlines of the U.S. states (white lines) are superimposed on the boundaries of 1836–1845.

The 1st Congress of the Republic of Texas convened in October 1836 at Columbia (now West Columbia). Stephen F. Austin, known as the Father of Texas, died December 27, 1836, after serving two months as Secretary of State for the new Republic. In 1836, five sites served as temporary capitals of Texas (Washington-on-the-Brazos, Harrisburg, Galveston, Velasco and Columbia) before President Sam Houston moved the capital to Houston in 1837. In 1839, the capital was moved to the new town of Austin by the next president, Mirabeau B. Lamar.

The internal politics of the Republic were based on the conflict between two factions. The nationalist faction, led by Mirabeau B. Lamar, advocated the continued independence of Texas, the expulsion of the Native Americans, and the expansion of Texas to the Pacific Ocean. Their opponents, led by Sam Houston, advocated the annexation of Texas to the United States and peaceful co-existence with Native Americans.

Although Texas governed itself, Mexico refused to recognize its independence. On March 5, 1842, a Mexican force of over 500 men, led by Ráfael Vásquez, invaded Texas for the first time since the revolution. They soon headed back to the Rio Grande after briefly occupying San Antonio. 1,400 Mexican troops, led by the French mercenary general Adrian Woll launched a second attack and captured San Antonio on September 11, 1842. A Texas militia retaliated at the Battle of Salado Creek. However, on September 18, this militia was defeated by Mexican soldiers and Texas Cherokee Indians during the Dawson massacre. The Mexican army would later retreat from the city of San Antonio.

To protect the Texas national archives, President Sam Houston ordered them out of Austin. Fearing that Houston planned to move the capital, Austin residents forced the archives back to Austin at gunpoint. The Texas Congress admonished Houston for the incident, and the incident solidified Austin as Texas's seat of government for the Republic and the future state.

== Statehood, war, and expansion (1845–1860) ==
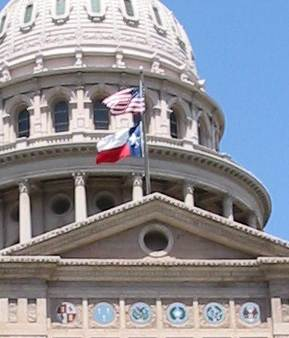
The U.S. and Texas flags at the Texas State Capitol.

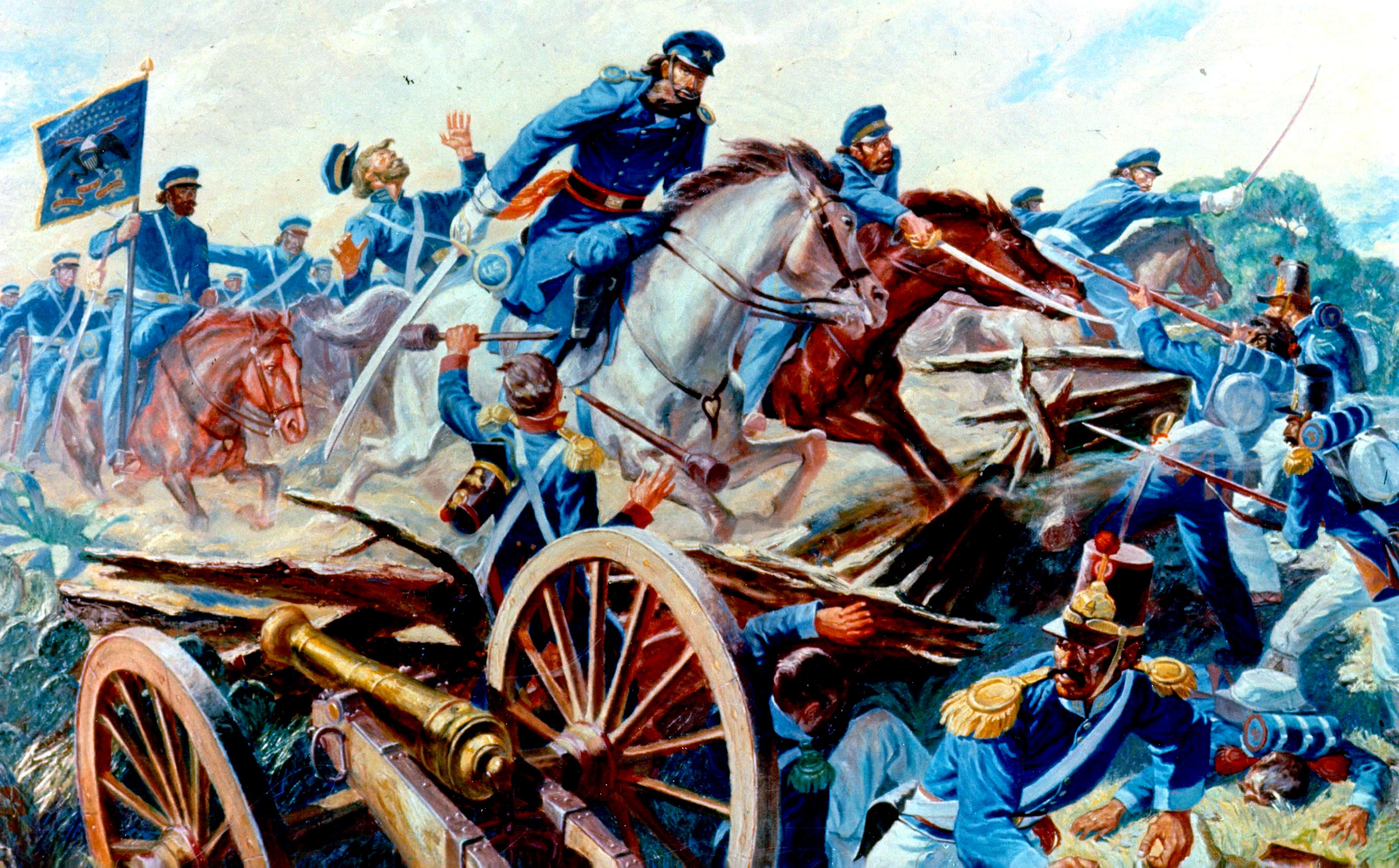
Captain Charles A. May's squadron of the 2d Dragoons slashes through the Mexican Army lines. Resaca de la Palma, Texas, May 1846

On February 28, 1845, the U.S. Congress narrowly passed a bill that authorized the United States to annex the Republic of Texas if it so voted. The legislation set the date for annexation for December 29 of the same year. On October 13 of the same year, a majority of voters in Texas approved a proposed constitution. This constitution was later accepted by the U.S. Congress, making Texas a U.S. state on the same day annexation took effect (therefore bypassing a territorial phase). Texas was annexed as the 28th state in the United States of America.

The Mexican government had long warned that annexation would mean war with the United States. When Texas joined the U.S., the Mexican government broke diplomatic relations with the United States. The United States now assumed the claims of Texas when it claimed all land north of the Rio Grande. In June 1845, President James K. Polk sent General Zachary Taylor to Texas, and by October, 3,500 Americans were on the Nueces River, prepared to defend Texas from a Mexican invasion. On November 10, 1845, Polk ordered General Taylor and his forces south to the Rio Grande, into disputed territory that Mexicans claimed as their own. Mexico claimed the Nueces River—about 150 miles (240 km) north of the Rio Grande—as its border with Texas.

On April 25, 1846, a 2,000-strong Mexican cavalry detachment attacked a 70-man U.S. patrol that had been sent into the contested territory north of the Rio Grande and south of the Nueces River. The Mexican cavalry routed the patrol, killing 16 U.S. soldiers in what later became known as the Thornton Affair. Both nations declared war. In the ensuing Mexican–American War, there were no more battles fought in Texas, but it became a major staging point for the American invasion of northern Mexico.

One of the primary motivations for annexation was the Texas government's huge debts. The United States agreed to assume many of these upon annexation. However, the former Republic never fully paid off its debt until the Compromise of 1850. In return for $10 million, a large portion of Texas-claimed territory, now parts of Colorado, Kansas, Oklahoma, New Mexico, and Wyoming, was ceded to the Federal government.

=== Migration ===
Intensified migration to Texas after statehood raised the population to about 150,000. Societies such as the Texas Emigration and Land Company now pledged to settle colonists who would agree to constitute a militia for defense against the Indians; in return they would receive a grant of 320 acres of choice land. Most of the newcomers continued to migrate from the states of the lower South; slavery was granted legal protection by the Texas constitution of 1845. The Texas population by 1860 was quite diverse, with large elements of European whites (from the American South), African Americans (mostly slaves brought from the east), Tejanos (Hispanics with Spanish heritage), and about 20,000 recent German immigrants.

The new state grew rapidly as migrants poured into the fertile cotton lands of east Texas. With their investments in cotton lands and slaves, Texas planters established cotton plantations in the eastern districts. The central area of the state was developed more by subsistence farmers who seldom owned slaves.

Texas in its Wild West days, attracted settlers who could shoot straight and possessed the zest for adventure, "for masculine renown, patriotic service, martial glory and meaningful deaths."

==== German immigration ====
The Germans were the largest group immigrating directly from Europe. According to the Handbook of Texas:

The Germans who settled Texas were diverse in many ways. They included peasant farmers and intellectuals; Protestants, Catholics, Jews, and atheists; Prussians, Saxons, Hessians, and Alsatians; abolitionists and slaveholders; farmers and townsfolk; frugal, honest folk and ax murderers. They differed in dialect, customs, and physical features. A majority had been farmers in Germany, and most arrived seeking economic opportunities. A few dissident intellectuals fleeing the 1848 revolutions in Germany sought political freedom, but few, save perhaps the Wends, went for religious freedom. The German settlements in Texas reflected their diversity. Even in the confined area of the Hill Country, each valley offered a different kind of German. The Llano valley had stern, teetotaling German Methodists, who renounced dancing and fraternal organizations; the Pedernales valley had fun-loving, hardworking Lutherans and Catholics who enjoyed drinking and dancing; and the Guadalupe valley had atheist Germans descended from intellectual political refugees. The scattered German ethnic islands were also diverse. These small enclaves included Lindsay in Cooke County, largely Westphalian Catholic; Waka in Ochiltree County, Midwestern Mennonite; Hurnville in Clay County, Russian German Baptist; and Lockett in Wilbarger County, Wendish Lutheran.

==== Czech immigration ====
The first Czech immigrants started their journey to Texas on August 19, 1851, headed by Jozef Šilar. Attracted to the rich farmland of Central Texas, Czechs settled in the counties of Austin, Fayette, Lavaca, and Washington. The Czech-American communities are characterized by a strong sense of community, and social clubs were a dominant aspect of Czech-American life in Texas. By 1865, the Czech population numbered 700; by 1940 there were more than 60,000 Czech-Americans in Texas.

== Civil War and Reconstruction (1860–1876) ==
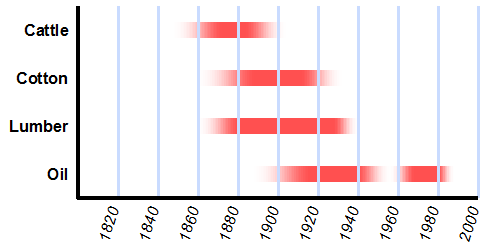
Boom periods of the four major industries that built the early Texas economy.

In the summer of 1860, a slave panic erupted in North and East Texas amid rumors of arson by slaves and abolitionists. Between 30 and 100 blacks and whites were lynched by vigilantes in the so-called "Texas Troubles". The events were used to arouse support for secession. Yet at least one fire was proven at the time to be due to a new kind of match that self-ignited in that season's unusual heat and wind, stopping the Denton lynch mob in that case.

As an essential part of the southern cotton industry, farmers depended on slave labor to do the massive amount of field work. In 1860, 30% of the total state population of 604,215 were enslaved. Slave owners were also politically dominant: During the 1860s, between 60 and 80% of state legislators came from a slave owning family, and 10–15% belonged to the Planter class. In the statewide election on the secession ordinance, Texans voted to secede from the Union by a vote of 46,129 to 14,697 (a 76% majority). The Secession Convention immediately organized a government, replacing Sam Houston when he refused to take an oath of allegiance to the Confederacy.

Texas declared its secession from the United States on February 1, 1861, and joined the Confederate States of America on March 2, 1861. With few battles in its territory, Texas was mainly a "supply state" for the Confederate forces until mid-1863, when the Union capture of the Mississippi River made large movements of men, horses or cattle impossible. Texas regiments fought in every major battle throughout the war. After the capture of New Orleans in 1862, slave owners with means to move forced the resettlement of enslaved people to Texas to escape the Union Army's reach. The last battle of the Civil War, the Battle of Palmito Ranch, was fought in Texas on May 12, 1865. The 2nd Texas Cavalry Battalion (U.S.) (one of only two from the state) took part.

=== Unionism ===
Many Texan unionists supported the Confederacy after the war began, but many others also clung to their unionism throughout the war, especially in the northern counties, the German districts in Texas Hill Country, and the Mexican areas. Local officials harassed unionists and engaged in large-scale massacres against unionists and German immigrants. In Cooke County, 150 suspected unionists were arrested; 25 were lynched without trial and 40 more were hanged after a summary trial. Draft resistance was widespread, especially among Texans of German or Mexican descent; many of the latter went to Mexico. Potential draftees went into hiding, Confederate officials hunted them down, and many were shot. On August 1, 1862, Confederate troops executed 34 pro-Union German Texans in the "Nueces Massacre" of civilians. Texas's most famous unionist was state Governor at the time, Sam Houston. After refusing to take an oath of allegiance to the Confederacy, he was deposed as governor.

=== Reconstruction ===
Even after news of the Emancipation Proclamation arrived in Galveston on June 19, 1865, creating the celebration of Juneteenth, slave owners withheld the news. It was not uncommon for them to delay telling the formerly enslaved people until after the harvest, according to historian Elizabeth Hayes Turner in her comprehensive essay, "Juneteenth: Emancipation and Memory". The state suffered little during the war, but trade and finance were disrupted. Angry returning veterans seized state property, and Texas went through a period of extensive violence and disorder. Most outrages took place in northern Texas; outlaws based in the Indian Territory plundered and murdered without distinction of party.

President Andrew Johnson appointed Union General A. J. Hamilton as provisional governor on June 17, 1865. Hamilton had been a prominent politician before the war. He granted amnesty to ex-Confederates if they promised to support the Union in the future, appointing some to office. On March 30, 1870, although Texas did not meet all the requirements, Congress restored Texas to the Union.

Many free blacks were able to become businessmen and leaders. Through the young Republican Party, blacks gained political power. Blacks comprised 90% of the Texas Republican Party during the 1880s. Norris Wright Cuney, an African American from Galveston, rose to the chairmanship of the Texas Republican Party and the national committeeman.

=== Democrats regain control after Reconstruction ===
Like other Southern states, by the late 1870s white Democrats regained control of the state legislature. They passed a new constitution in 1876 that segregated schools and established a poll tax to support them, but it was not originally required for voting.

Within the Republican Party the Lily-white movement emerged, a movement to wrest control of the party by whites and eliminate black influence altogether. The movement had its origins in Texas but spread across the nation. This in addition to wider efforts to restrict the influence of non-whites rapidly reversed the fortunes of the black population.

=== Historiography ===
During the 20th century, national historiographical trends influenced the scholarship on the Civil War in Texas. Beginning in the 1950s, historians focused on military campaigns in Texas and other areas of the Southwest, a region previously neglected. Since the 1970s, scholars have shifted their attention to South Texas, exploring how its relations with Mexico and Mexican Americans affected both Confederate and Union Civil War military operations. Also since the 1970s, the "New Social History" has stimulated research in war-related social, economic, and political changes. This historiographical trend is related to a growing interest in local and regional history.

== Late 19th century (1876–1899) ==
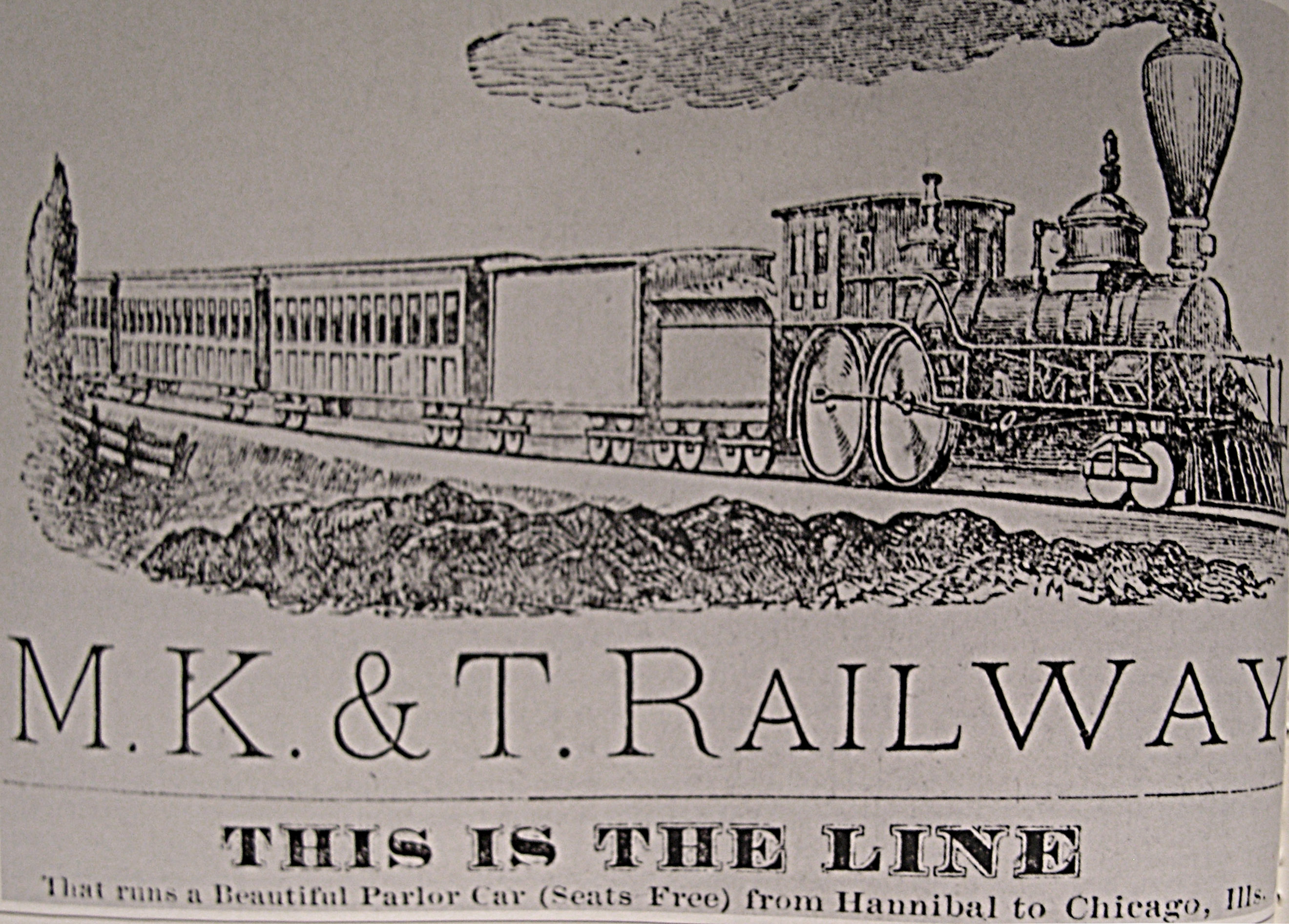
The Missouri-Kansas-Texas Railroad – the "Katy" – was the first railroad to enter Texas from the north

Racial violence continued by whites against blacks as they enforced white supremacy. Despite this, freedmen pursued education, organized new churches and fraternal organizations, and entered politics, winning local offices. By the 1890s, more than 100,000 blacks were voting in state elections. In 1896 and 1898, Republican Robert B. Hawley was elected to Congress from the state by a plurality, when most white voters split between the Democratic and Populist parties. Democrats were determined to end competition by Republicans and Populists, and reviewed what other Southern states were doing to disenfranchise blacks and poor whites. Mississippi's new constitution of 1890 had survived a Supreme Court case, although in practice it was highly discriminatory against freedmen.

=== Land use politics ===
Much of Texas politics of the remainder of the 19th century centered on land use. Guided by the federal Morill Act, Texas sold public lands to gain funds to invest in higher education. In 1876, the Agricultural and Mechanical College of Texas opened, and seven years later the University of Texas at Austin began conducting classes.

New land use policies drafted during the administration of Governor John Ireland enabled individuals to accumulate land, leading to the formation of large cattle ranches. Many ranchers ran barbed wire around public lands, to protect their access to water and free grazing. This caused several range wars. Governor Lawrence Sullivan Ross guided the Texas Legislature to reform the land use policies.

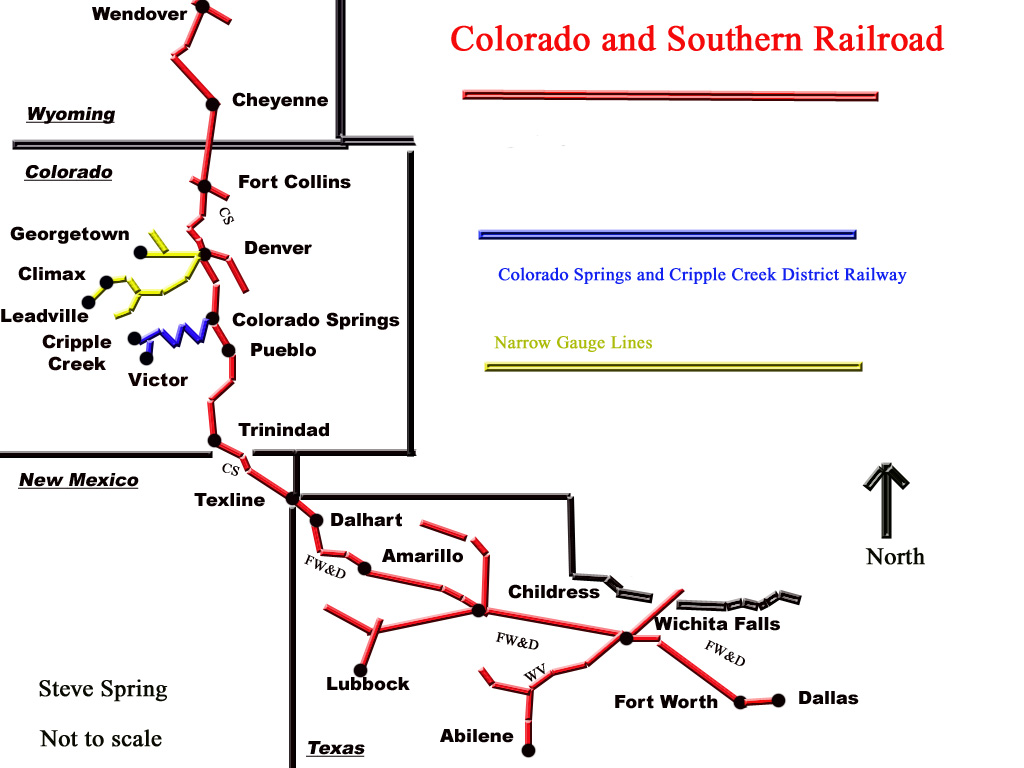
Map of the Colorado & Southern Railroad lines, including the Fort Worth and Denver City lines in Texas

The coming of the railroads in the 1880s ended the famous cattle drives and allowed ranchers to market their cattle after a short drive, and farmers move their cotton to market cheaply. They made Dallas and other cities the centers of commercial activity. Ft. Worth became the gateway to the west, via the Fort Worth and Denver Railway. However the passenger trains were often the targets of armed gangs.

Governor Lawrence Sullivan Ross had to personally intervene to resolve the Jaybird-Woodpecker War (1888–1889) among factions of Democrats in Fort Bend County; at bottom, it was a racial conflict. The majority population was black by a large margin, and had been electing county officers for 20 years. But, the white elite Democrats wanted their own people in power. Conflict became violent and the Jaybirds ordered several blacks out of town. Tensions increased and a total of seven people were killed. In the fall of 1889, the Democratic Party created "white-only pre-primary elections," which in practice were the only competitive contests in the county, and thus disenfranchised the blacks. This situation lasted until the U.S. Supreme Court ruling in Terry v. Adams (1953) declared it unconstitutional in the last of the white primary cases.

Under Jim Hogg, the state turned its attention toward corporations violating the state monopoly laws. In 1894, Texas filed a lawsuit against John D. Rockefeller's Standard Oil Company and its Texas subsidiary, the Waters-Pierce Oil Company of Missouri. Hogg and his attorney-general argued that the companies were engaged in rebates, price fixing, consolidation, and other tactics prohibited by the state's 1889 antitrust act. The investigation resulted in a number of indictments, including one for Rockefeller. Hogg requested that Rockefeller be extradited from New York, but the New York governor refused, as Rockefeller had not fled from Texas. Rockefeller was never tried, but other employees of the company were found guilty.

== Texas in prosperity, depression, and WWII (1900–1945) ==
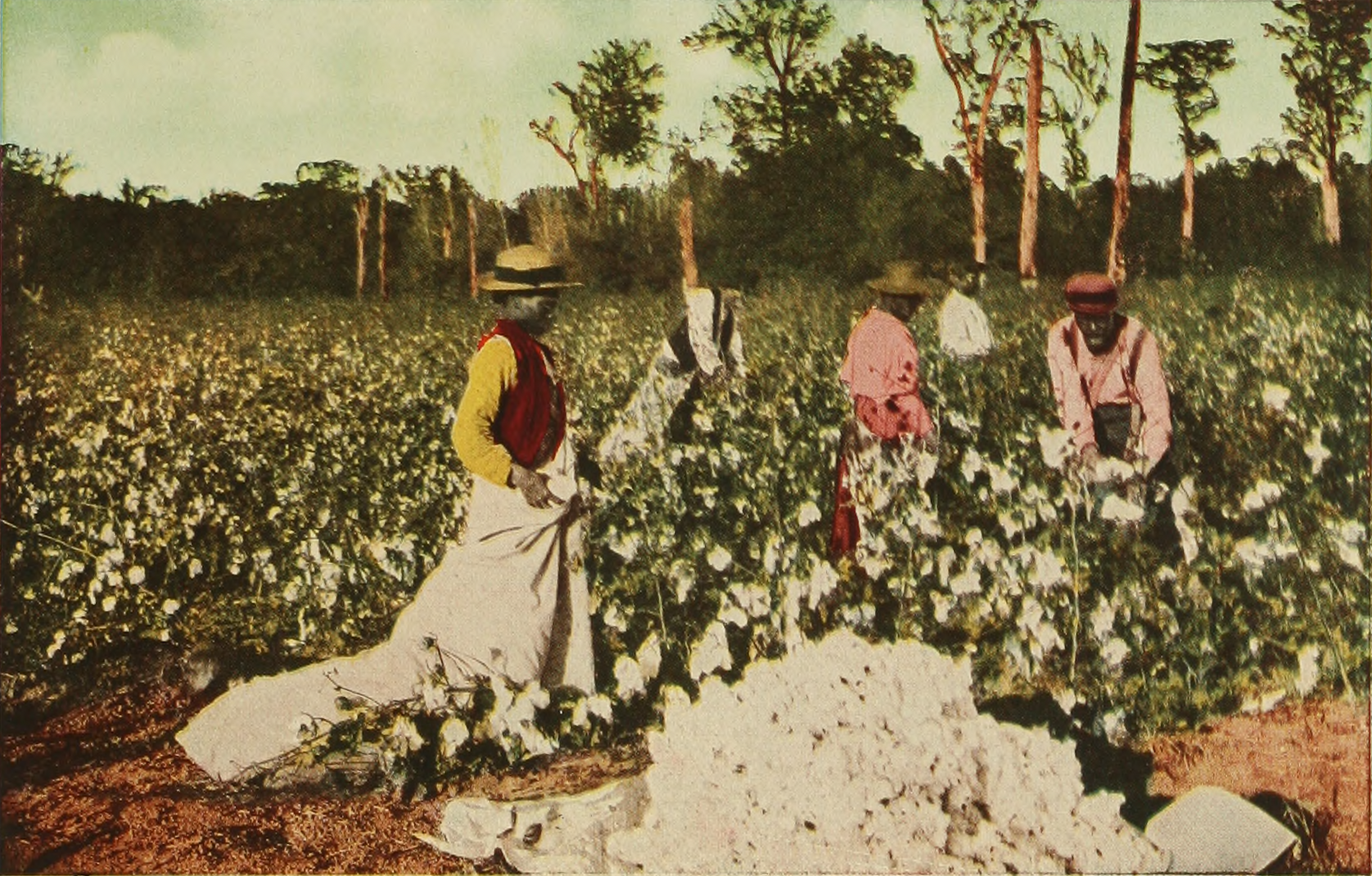
1913 cotton harvest in East Texas

Galveston, the fourth-largest city in Texas and then the major port, was destroyed by a hurricane with 100 mph (160 km/h) winds on September 8, 1900. The storm created a 20 ft (6.1 m) storm surge when it hit the island, 6–9 ft (1.8–2.7 m) higher than any previously recorded flood. Water covered the entire island, killing between 6,000 and 8,000 people, destroying 3,500 homes as well as the railroad causeway and wagon bridge that connected the island to the mainland. To help rebuild their city, citizens implemented a reformed government featuring a five-man city commission. Galveston was the first city to implement a city commission government, and its plan was adopted by 500 other small cities across the United States.

In the aftermath of the Galveston disaster, action proceeded on building the Houston Ship Channel to create a more protected inland port. Houston quickly grew once the Channel was completed, and rapidly became the primary port in Texas. Railroads were constructed in a radial pattern to link Houston with other major cities such as Dallas-Fort Worth, San Antonio, and Austin.

By 1900, the Dallas population reached 38,000 as banking and insurance became major activities in the increasingly white-collar city, which was now the world's leading cotton center. It was also the world's center of harness making and leather goods. Businessmen took control of civic affairs; with little municipal patronage, there was only a small role for the Democratic Party to play. The predominantly black Republican Party was essentially closed out of politics by the disenfranchisement in 1901 of most blacks through imposition of a poll tax (see below).

=== Disenfranchisement ===
Determined to control politics in the state, reduce competition from Republicans and Populists, and close blacks out of politics, in 1901 the Democrat-dominated state legislature passed a poll tax as a requirement for voting. Given the economic difficulties of the times, the poll tax caused participation by African Americans, poor whites, and Mexican Americans to drop sharply, effectively disenfranchising more than one-third of the population of the state.

By the early 20th century, the Democratic Party in Texas started using a "white primary." Restricting the Democratic primary to white voters was another way of closing minorities out of politics, as the primary was the only competitive contest for office in the one-party state. By 1906, the number of black voters had dropped from more than 100,000 in the 1890s to 5,000. The state also passed a law for white primaries. In 1896, 86.6% of all voters in Texas voted in the presidential election; following disenfranchisement, voter turnout in 1904 was 29.2% and in 1920 was 21.6%.

When the Supreme Court ruled in 1923 that white primaries established by political parties were unconstitutional, in 1927 the Texas state legislature passed a bill that authorized political parties to establish their internal practices. The Democratic Party reinstated the white primary. That law survived until 1944 before another Supreme Court case ruled that it was unconstitutional. After 1944, the NAACP and other organizations worked to register black voters and participation increased. But the major disenfranchisement continued until passage in the mid-1960s of civil rights legislation, including the Voting Rights Act of 1965, to provide for federal oversight in areas in which historically minorities did not vote in expected numbers based on population.

=== Population growth ===
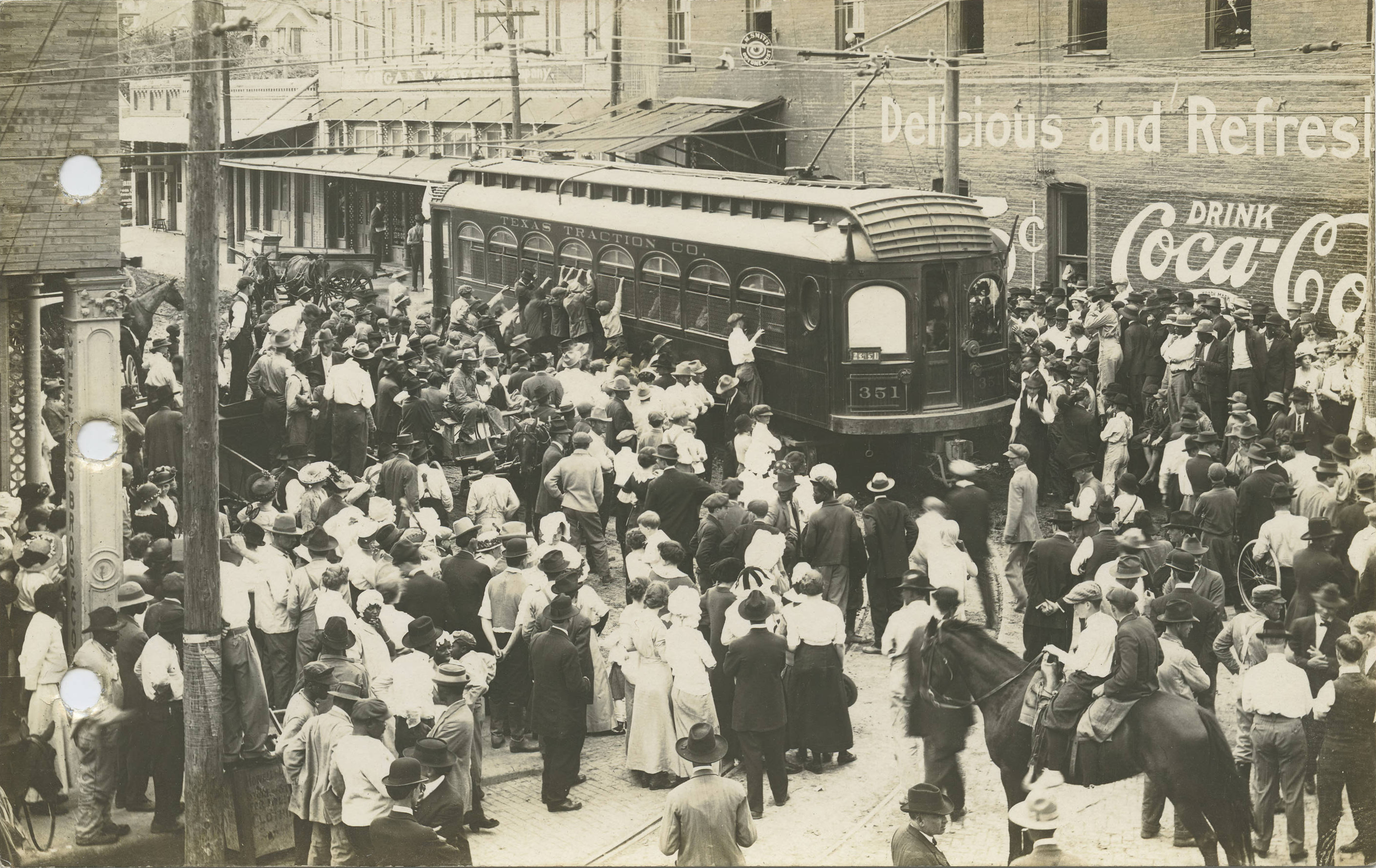
First day of passenger service, Dallas & Sherman Interurban Railroad, 1908

Texas reached 4 million population in 1910, making it the fifth largest state, and continued to grow. It remained primarily rural, based on cotton farms and ranches, with 30% living in numerous villages and towns and a few cities.

Galveston with 17,000 was the largest city in 1870; it recovered from the devastating hurricane of 1900, which killed 6,000 people, and reached 37,000 in 1910. Galveston became nationally famous for its modernized "commission form" of government that stressed efficiency and minimized patronage.

The largest city in 1910 was San Antonio at 96,000. Houston (79,000 in 1910) was a rail and oil center; it competed with Dallas (92,000), the banking and merchandising center. Thanks to the meat packing plants that opened in Fort Worth in 1903, it reached 73,000 in 1910. El Paso counted 39,000; Austin, the capital, 30,000; and Waco 26,000. The Model T and other autos began arriving, and along with tractors they started to replace mules and horses on the farm. None of the cities had significant suburbs; instead they built street car systems to bring shoppers to the central business district.

In 1911 an extremely bloody decade-long civil war broke out in Mexico. Hundreds of thousands of refugees fled to Texas, raising the Hispanic population from 72,000 in 1900 to 250,000 in 1920. The number reached 700,000 in 1930, 1,400,000 in 1960, and 4 million in 1990.

Blacks grew in number but declined as a proportion, falling from 22% of 1890 population in 1890 to 16% in 1920. They were increasingly segregated in public places, and lost the right to vote. Physical intimidation occurred regularly. Of the 468 lynching victims in the state between 1885, the peak, and the last episode in 1942, 339 were black, 77 white, 53 Hispanic, and 1 Indian. Much improved law enforcement after 1920 meant the violence rapidly died out, but segregation only ended in 1964.

==== Dallas growth ====
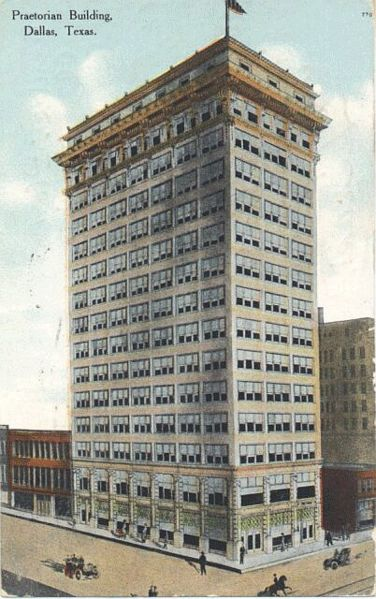
The Praetorian Building in Dallas, completed 1909, was the first skyscraper west of the Mississippi and the tallest in Texas.

Texans in 1909 marked an icon of progress with the construction of the first skyscraper west of the Mississippi. The 190-foot steel-frame skyscraper was the 14-story Praetorian Building, housing the Praetorian Insurance Company. Dallas became the regional headquarters of the Federal Reserve in 1914, strengthening its dominance of Texas banking. The city had reached 260,000 population by 1929 when the effects of the Stock Market Crash hit Texas, causing a sharp drop in the prices of oil, cotton and cattle; growth came to a standstill.

=== Oil ===
On the morning of January 10, 1901, Anthony F. Lucas, an experienced mining engineer, drilled the first major oil well at Spindletop, a small hill south of Beaumont, Texas. The East Texas Oil Field, discovered on October 5, 1930, is located in east central part of the state, and is the largest and most prolific oil reservoir in the contiguous United States. Other oil fields were later discovered in West Texas and under the Gulf of Mexico. The resulting Texas Oil Boom permanently transformed the economy of Texas, and led to its most significant economic expansion after the Civil War.

=== Great Depression ===
The economy, which had experienced significant recovery since the Civil War, was dealt a double blow by the Great Depression and the Dust Bowl. After the Stock Market Crash of 1929, the economy suffered significant reversals. Thousands of city workers became unemployed, many of whom depended on federal relief programs such as FERA, WPA and CCC. Thousands of unemployed Mexican citizens received one-way bus tickets to their home villages in Mexico.

Farmers and ranchers were especially hard hit, as prices for cotton and livestock fell sharply. Beginning in 1934 and lasting until 1939, the Dust Bowl, an ecological disaster of severe wind and drought, caused an exodus from Texas and the surrounding plains, in which over 500,000 Americans were homeless, hungry and jobless. Thousands left the region forever to seek economic opportunities in California. For the majority of farmers who remained, the New Deal's Agricultural Adjustment Act was a crash program started in 1933 that in two weeks signed up cotton growers, even as agents and committeemen faced poor roads, bureaucratic delays, inadequate supplies, balking mules, and language barriers. It brought recovery by the mid-1930s, raising cotton prices by controls on how much farmers could plant.

=== World War II ===
World War II had a dramatic effect on Texas, as federal money poured in to build military bases, munitions factories, POW detention camps and Army hospitals. Over 750,000 Texans left for service; the cities exploded with new industry; the colleges took on new roles; and hundreds of thousands of poor farmers left for much better-paying war jobs, never to return to agriculture. Texas needed more farm workers. The Bracero Program brought in 117,000 Mexicans to work temporarily.

Existing military bases in Texas were expanded and numerous new training bases were built: Texas World War II Army Airfields; Brooke Army Medical Center, Camp Mabry, Corpus Christi Army Depot, Fort Bliss, Fort Hood, Fort Sam Houston, Ingleside Army Depot, Red River Army Depot, especially for aviation training. The good flying weather made the state a favorite location for Air Force training bases. In the largest aviation training program in the world, 200,000 graduated from programs at 40 Texas airfields, including 45,000 pilots, 12,000 bombardiers, 12,000 navigators, and thousands of aerial gunners, photographers, and mechanics. Fred Allison in a study of Majors Field, the Army Air Forces Basic Flying School, at Greenville during 1942–45, shows that the base—like most military bases in rural Texas—invigorated the local economy, but also changed the cultural climate of the conservative Christian town, especially around unprecedented freedom regarding alcohol, dating and dancing, and race relations.

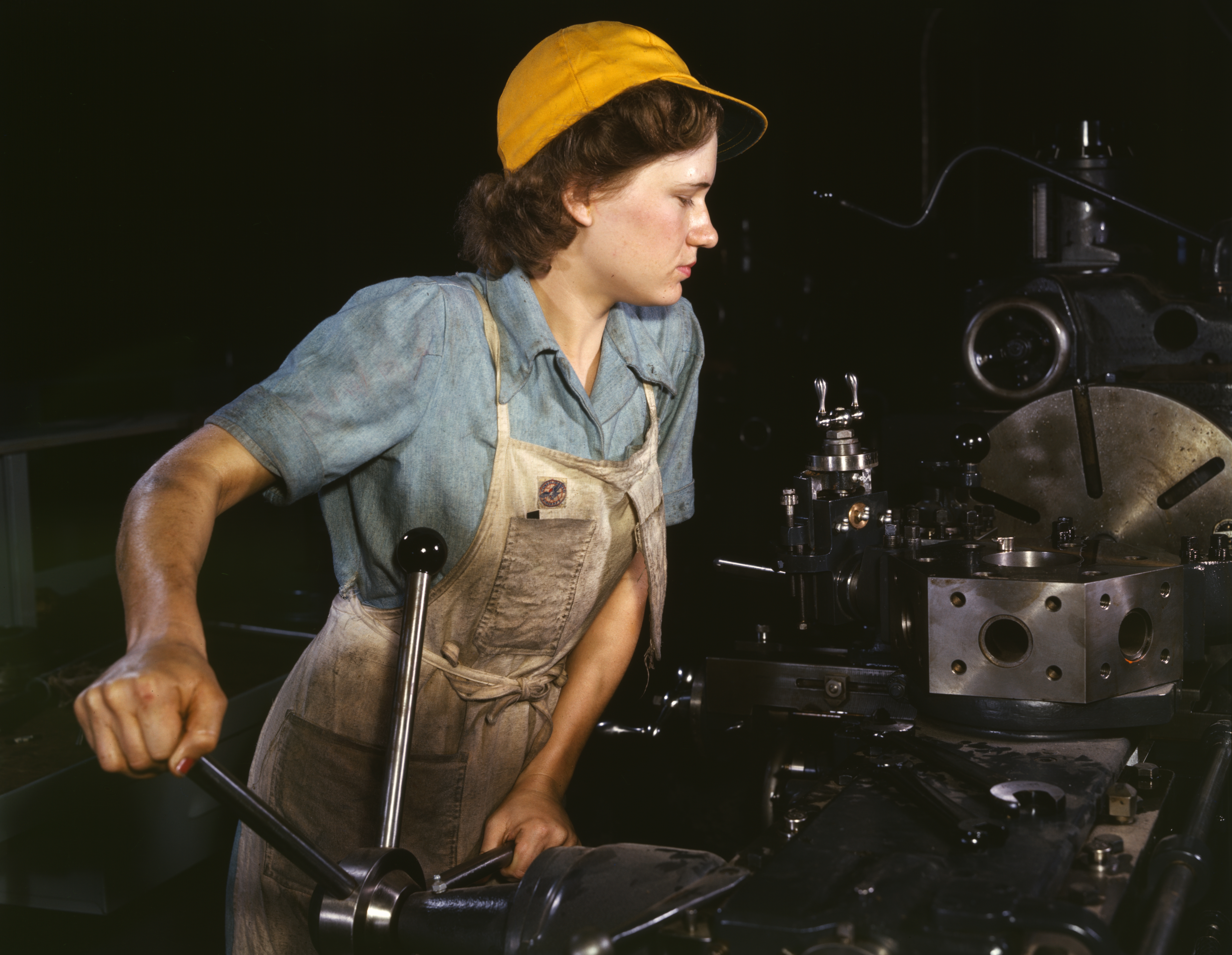
A factory worker in Fort Worth, Texas, 1942

The Lone Star Army Ammunition Plant and the Longhorn Army Ammunition Plant were built as part of the WWII buildup. Hundreds of thousands of American (and some allied) soldiers, sailors and airmen trained in the state. All sectors of the economy boomed as the homefront prospered.

During WWII, Texas became home to as many as 78,982 enemy prisoners, mainly Germans; it held 15% of the total POWs in the United States. There were fourteen prisoner-of-war camps in the state. The POWs in the camps were put to work to supplement the local farm labor lost to the war. Though contemporary War Department officials claimed that government attempts at denazification of the prisoners were highly successful, Nazi influence upon prisons in individual camps was common for the duration of the POW program. Walker examined Nazi activities in Texas POW camps during 1943–45 and found that the military authorities had failed to eradicate the influence of Nazi leaders.

Previously a largely rural area, East Texas became more urban as workers were recruited for the oil, shipbuilding, and aircraft industries. East Texans made many contributions to the war effort, both at home and in the armed forces. High schools had patriotic programs as well, but so many teachers and older students left for the military or for defense jobs that budgets were cut, programs dropped, and the curriculum had to be scaled down. Hospitals reported a shortage of supplies and medical personnel, as many doctors and most of the younger nurses joined the services.

Harmon General Hospital, one of the Army's largest, opened in Longview in November 1942 with 157 hospital buildings and a capacity of 2,939 beds. The facility was designed for the treatment of soldiers with central nervous system syphilis, psychiatric disorders, tropical illnesses, and dermatological diseases. At the end of the war, the facility was adapted for use as the campus of LeTourneau University.

Baylor University, like most schools, was successful in the multiple missions of aiding national defense, recruiting soldiers, and keeping the institution operational while the war continued. Texas Tech University likewise had many roles in the war; the most famous was the War Training Service Pre-Flight program during 1943–44. It prepared Air Force pilots for full-fledged military aviation training. The efforts of Clent Breedove and M. F. Dagley, private contractors for the Civilian Pilot Training Program at the university site since 1939, with Harold Humphries as chief pilot, brought an economic boost to Lubbock. 3,750 cadets received classroom instruction and flying time. From February 1943 to January 1944, more than 2,000 women completed training at the Women's Army Auxiliary Corps Branch Number One, Army Administration School, at Stephen F. Austin State Teacher's College in Nacogdoches.

Nowhere were the wartime effects greater than in Houston, which in 1940 was a city of 400,000 population dependent on shipping and oil. The war dramatically expanded the city's economic base, thanks to massive federal spending. Energetic entrepreneurs, most notably George Brown, James Elkins and James Abercrombie, landed hundreds of millions of dollars in federal wartime investment in technologically complex facilities. Houston oil companies moved from being refiners and became sophisticated producers of petrochemicals. Especially important were synthetic rubber and high octane fuel, which retained their importance after the war. The war moved the natural gas industry from a minor factor to a major energy source; Houston became a major hub when a local firm purchased the federally financed Inch pipelines. Other major growth industries included steel, munitions, and shipbuilding.

Tens of thousands of new migrants streamed in from rural areas, straining the city's housing supply and the city's ability to provide local transit and schools. For the first time, high-paying jobs went to large numbers of women, blacks and Hispanics. The city's African-American community, emboldened by their newfound prosperity, increased its agitation for civil rights; they backed and funded the legal case of Smith v. Allwright (1944), in which the Supreme Court ruled against the latest version of the white primary in support of voting rights.

Throughout East Texas, black family growth and dissolution came more rapidly than in peacetime; blacks were more mobile as an adjustment to employment opportunities. There was a more rapid shift to factory labor, higher economic returns, and a willingness of whites to tolerate the change in black economic status so long as the traditional "Jim Crow" social relations were maintained.

== Texas modernizes (1945–present) ==
=== 1950s Texas drought ===
Beginning in 1949, Texas was hit with a devastating drought that extended until 1957. Rainfall decreased 30 to 50 percent, while temperatures rose, killing crops, livestock, and triggering a rise of dust storms. As a result, the number of Texas farms and ranches declined by nearly 100,000, and Texas experienced a period of mass urbanization as the rural population moved to the city to rebuild their livelihoods. The state's rural population declined from more than a third of the population to a quarter. As a result, the Texas Water Development Board was created in 1957, and the state began a period of building a diverse system of water conservation plans. This included increasing access to groundwater, and creating lakes by damming rivers.

=== JFK assassination ===
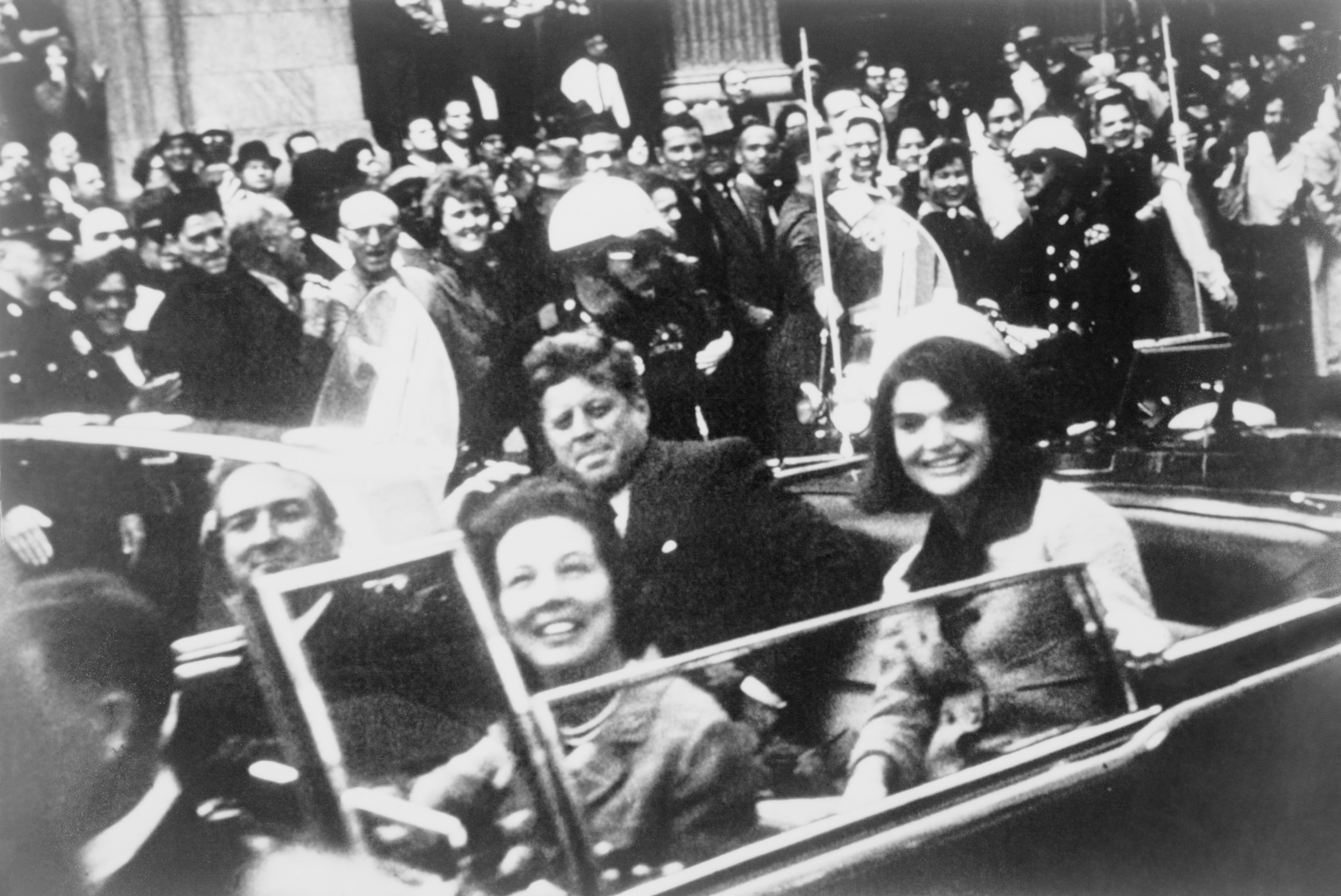
President John F. Kennedy in the presidential limousine, minutes before his assassination

On Friday, November 22, 1963, in Dallas, Texas, at 12:30 pm Central Standard Time (18:30 UTC), Lee Harvey Oswald shot and killed President John F. Kennedy. The Texas Governor, John B. Connally, was also shot but survived. The episode caused a national outrage focused on right wing elements in Dallas that had long been hostile to Kennedy. However, Oswald was a pro Castro Marxist revolutionary and had no discernable connection to any right-wing organizations. In fact, no organizations of the right (or left) were implicated in the assassination. In the aftermath, many in media and on the political left attempted to smear the city and its citizens with accusations that "Dallas is a deceased city" or "Dallas is a city of hate". But subsequently, Oswald was found to have acted alone and had, at best, a tangential connection to the city, having lived there for only a short time. Nevertheless, for a half-century and more the people of Dallas still struggle with being branded as having some responsibility. The Sixth Floor Museum at Dealey Plaza, located where the assassin is believed to have fired the shots, has become a historic tourist site.

=== Higher education ===
During World War II the main universities like University of Texas and Texas A&M University gained a new national role. The wartime financing of university research, curricular change, campus trainee programs, and postwar veteran enrollments changed the tenor and allowed Texas schools to gain national stature.

From 1950 through the 1960s, Texas modernized and dramatically expanded its system of higher education. Under the leadership of Governor Connally, the state produced a long-range plan for higher education, a more rational distribution of resources, and a central state apparatus that managed state institutions with greater efficiency. Because of these changes, Texas universities received federal funds for research and development during the John F. Kennedy and Lyndon B. Johnson administrations.

=== Economic and demographic change ===
Beginning around the mid-20th century, Texas began to transform from a rural and agricultural state to one that was urban and industrialized. The state's population grew quickly during this period, with large levels of migration from outside the state. As a part of the Sun Belt Texas experienced strong economic growth, particularly during the 1970s and early 1980s. Texas's economy diversified, lessening its reliance on the petroleum industry. By 1990, Hispanics overtook blacks to become the largest minority group in the state.

=== Shift to the Republican Party ===
Prior to the mid-20th century, Texas was essentially a one-party state, and the Democratic primary was viewed as "the real election". The Democratic Party had conservative and liberal factions, which became more pronounced after the New Deal. Additionally, several factions of the party briefly split during the 1930s and 40s.

The state's conservative white voters began to support Republican presidential candidates by the mid-20th century. After this period, they supported Republicans for local and state offices as well, and most white citizens became Republican Party members. The party also attracted some minorities, but many have continued to vote for Democratic candidates. The shift to the Republican Party is much attributed to the fact that the Democratic Party became increasingly liberal during the 20th century, and thus was increasingly thought to be out-of-touch by the average Texas voter. As Texas was always a conservative state, voters switched to the GOP, which now more closely reflected their beliefs. Commentators have also attributed the shift to Republican political consultant Karl Rove, who managed numerous political campaigns in Texas in the 1980s and 90s. Other stated reasons included court-ordered redistricting and the demographic shift in relation to the Sun Belt that favored the Republican Party and conservatism.

The 2003 Texas redistricting of Congressional districts led by Republican Tom DeLay, was called by the New York Times "an extreme case of partisan gerrymandering". A group of Democratic legislators, the "Texas Eleven", fled the state in a quorum-busting effort to prevent the legislature from acting, but was unsuccessful. The state had already redistricted following the 2000 census. Despite these efforts, the legislature passed a map heavily in favor of Republicans, based on 2000 data and ignoring the estimated nearly one million new residents in the state since that date. Career attorneys and analysts at the Department of Justice objected to the plan as diluting the votes of African American and Hispanic voters, but political appointees overrode them and approved it. Legal challenges to the redistricting reached the national Supreme Court in the case League of United Latin American Citizens v. Perry (2006), but the court ruled in favor of the state (and Republicans).

In the 2014 Texas elections, the Tea Party movement made large gains, with numerous Tea Party favorites being elected into office, including Dan Patrick as lieutenant governor, Ken Paxton as attorney general, in addition to numerous other candidates including conservative Republican Greg Abbott as governor.

=== Native American self-Determination ===
In the late 20th century, Native American tribes regained federal recognition by organizing under the Indian Reorganization Act. They have been able to expand their government-to-government relationships with the U.S. federal government under the Indian Self-Determination and Education Assistance Act of 1975. Three federally recognized Native American tribes are headquartered in Texas today. They are:

- Alabama-Coushatta Tribe of Texas
- Kickapoo Traditional Tribe of Texas
- Ysleta del Sur Pueblo

The state formed the Texas Commission for Indian Affairs in 1965 to oversee state-tribal relations; however, the commission was dissolved in 1989.

=== COVID-19 ===
The state of Texas confirmed its first case on February 13, 2020, and many of the state's largest cities recorded their first cases throughout March. As of late May 2021, there were 50,198 COVID-19 related deaths reported in that state. The death rate in Texas was 175 for every 100,000 people, while national COVID-19 death rate was 179 per 100,000.

On March 13, Governor Abbott declared a state of disaster for all counties in Texas, invoking emergency powers for his administration, and ordered state employees to remote work. Day cares, nursing homes, and prisons were asked to limit visitations. The state's first mobile testing center for COVID-19 opened in San Antonio. Colleges and universities throughout the state extended spring breaks with some transitioning to online instruction, including Baylor University, the University of Houston, the University of North Texas, the University of Texas at Austin, Texas State University, and Texas Tech University. School districts also announced temporary suspensions of classes statewide.

== See also ==
- Comanche history
- Forts of Texas
- History of vice in Texas
- History of slavery in Texas
- History of Texas forests
- History of the Southern United States
- History of the Western United States
- LGBT rights in Texas
- List of historical societies in Texas
- Education in Texas
- Texas divisionism
- Texas Historical Commission
- Texas Oil Boom
- Women's suffrage in Texas
- History of African Americans in Texas
- History of Mexican Americans in Texas

Cities in Texas

- Timeline of Arlington, Texas
- Timeline of Austin, Texas
- Timeline of Dallas
- Timeline of El Paso, Texas
- Timeline of Houston
- Timeline of San Antonio

== Bibliography ==
- Bagur, Jacques D. (2012). Antebellum Jefferson, Texas: Everyday Life in an East Texas Town. Denton: University of North Texas Press. ISBN 978-1-5744-1265-9.
- Barr, Alwyn (1996), Black Texans: A history of African Americans in Texas, 1528–1995 (2nd ed.), Norman: University of Oklahoma Press, ISBN 978-0-8061-2878-8
- Barr, Alwyn (1990), Texans in Revolt: the Battle for San Antonio, 1835, Austin: University of Texas Press, ISBN 978-0-292-77042-3, OCLC 20354408
- Blanton, Carlos Kevin (2005). "The Campus and the Capitol: John B. Connally and the Struggle over Texas Higher Education Policy, 1950–1970". Southwestern Historical Quarterly. 108 (4): 468–497. ISSN 0038-478X.
- Campbell, Randolph B. An empire for slavery: The peculiar institution in Texas, 1821–1865 (LSU Press, 1991)
- Chipman, Donald E. (1992), Spanish Texas, 1519–1821, Austin: University of Texas Press, ISBN 978-0-292-77659-3
- Davis, William C. (2006) [2004], Lone Star Rising: The Revolutionary Birth of the Texas Republic, College Station: Texas A&M University Press, ISBN 978-1-58544-532-5
- Edmondson, J.R. (2000), The Alamo Story: From History to Current Conflicts, Plano: Republic of Texas Press, ISBN 978-1-55622-678-6
- Hardin, Stephen L. (1994), Texian Iliad, Austin: University of Texas Press, ISBN 978-0-292-73086-1
- Hendrickson, Kenneth E. Jr. (1995), The Chief of Executives of Texas: From Stephen F. Austin to John B. Connally, Jr., College Station: Texas A&M University Press, ISBN 978-0-89096-641-9
- Lack, Paul D. (1992), The Texas Revolutionary Experience: A Political and Social History 1835–1836, College Station: Texas A&M University Press, ISBN 978-0-89096-497-2
- McComb, David G. The City in Texas: A History (University of Texas Press, 2015) 342 pp.
- Mendoza, Alexander, and Charles David Grear, eds. Texans and War: New Interpretations of the State's Military History 2012 excerpt
- Scott, Robert (2000). After the Alamo. Plano, TX: Republic of Texas Press. ISBN 978-0-585-22788-7.
- Smith, Franklin (1991), Joseph E. Chance (ed.), The Mexican War Journal of Captain Franklin Smith, Jackson, Mississippi: University Press of Mississippi
- Storey, John W., and Mary L. Kelley, eds. Twentieth Century Texas: A Social and Cultural History (2008); 15 specialized articles by scholars
- Vazquez, Josefina Zoraida (1997), "The Colonization and Loss of Texas: A Mexican Perspective", in Rodriguez O., Jaime E.; Vincent, Kathryn (eds.), Myths, Misdeeds, and Misunderstandings: The Roots of Conflict in U.S.–Mexican Relations, Wilmington, Delaware: Scholarly Resources, ISBN 978-0-8420-2662-8
- Todish, Timothy J.; Todish, Terry; Spring, Ted (1998), Alamo Sourcebook, 1836: A Comprehensive Guide to the Battle of the Alamo and the Texas Revolution, Austin: Eakin Press, ISBN 978-1-57168-152-2
- Weber, David J. (1992), The Spanish Frontier in North America, Yale Western Americana Series, New Haven, Connecticut: Yale University Press, ISBN 978-0-300-05198-8
