= First Baptist Church (Trinidad, Colorado) =

Historic church in Colorado, United States

- U.S. National Register of Historic Places
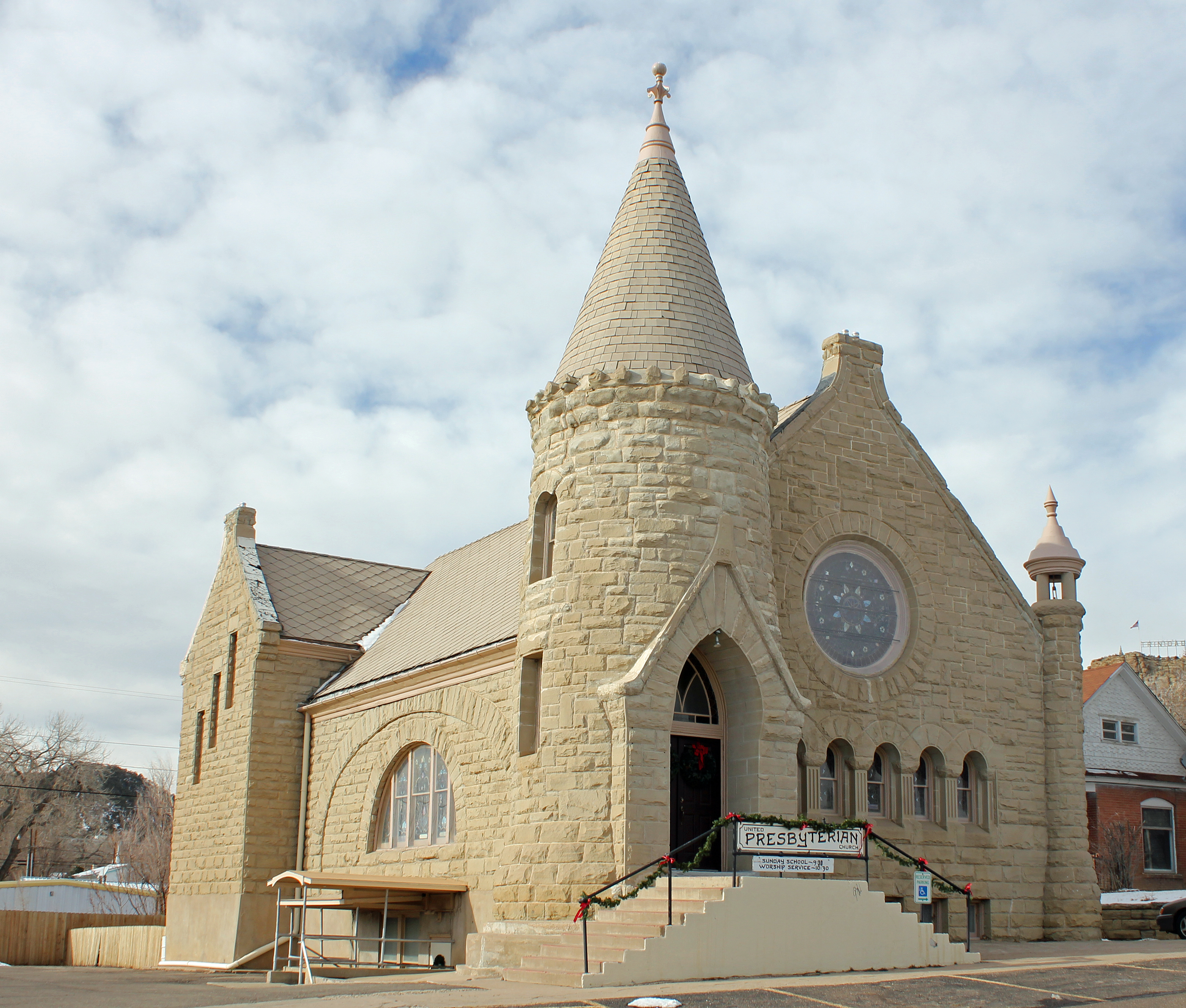

- Location within Colorado Location within the United States
- Location: 809 San Pedro St., Trinidad, Colorado
- Coordinates: 37°10′31″N 104°30′27″W
- Area: less than one acre
- Built: 1890
- Architect: Charles W. Bulger and Isaac Hamilton Rapp
- Architectural style: Romanesque
- NRHP reference No.: 00000005
- Added to NRHP: January 28, 2000

The First Baptist Church in Trinidad, Colorado is a historic church at 809 San Pedro Street. It was built in 1890 and was added to the National Register of Historic Places in 2000.

It is a "Romanesque-inspired" building with a T-shaped plan, built of local buff-colored sandstone upon a concrete foundation.

It was designed by Trinidad architects Charles W. Bulger and Isaac Hamilton Rapp, and is perhaps just their second commission when they were in partnership.
