= National Register of Historic Places listings in Donley County, Texas =

Location of Donley County in Texas

This is a list of the National Register of Historic Places listings in Donley County, Texas.

This is intended to be a complete list of properties and districts listed on the National Register of Historic Places in Donley County, Texas. There are three properties listed on the National Register in the county. Two properties are Recorded Texas Historic Landmarks including one that is also a State Antiquities Landmark.

This National Park Service list is complete through NPS recent listings posted March 21, 2025.

== Current listings ==
The locations of National Register properties may be seen in a mapping service provided.

	Name on the Register	Image	Date listed	Location	City or town	Description
1	Clarendon Motor Company Building	Clarendon Motor Company Building	November 10, 1994 (#94001309)	221 S. Sully St. 34°56′16″N 100°53′20″W	Clarendon	
2	Donley County Courthouse and Jail	Donley County Courthouse and Jail	February 17, 1978 (#78002924)	Public Sq. 34°56′14″N 100°53′26″W	Clarendon	State Antiquities Landmark, Recorded Texas Historic Landmark
3	Martin-Lowe House	Martin-Lowe House	November 21, 1985 (#85002911)	507 W. Fifth; 34°56′13″N 100°53′38″W	Clarendon	Recorded Texas Historic Landmark

== See also ==
- National Register of Historic Places listings in Texas
- Recorded Texas Historic Landmarks in Donley County
