= Donley County Courthouse and Jail =

- U.S. National Register of Historic Places
- Texas State Antiquities Landmark
- Recorded Texas Historic Landmark
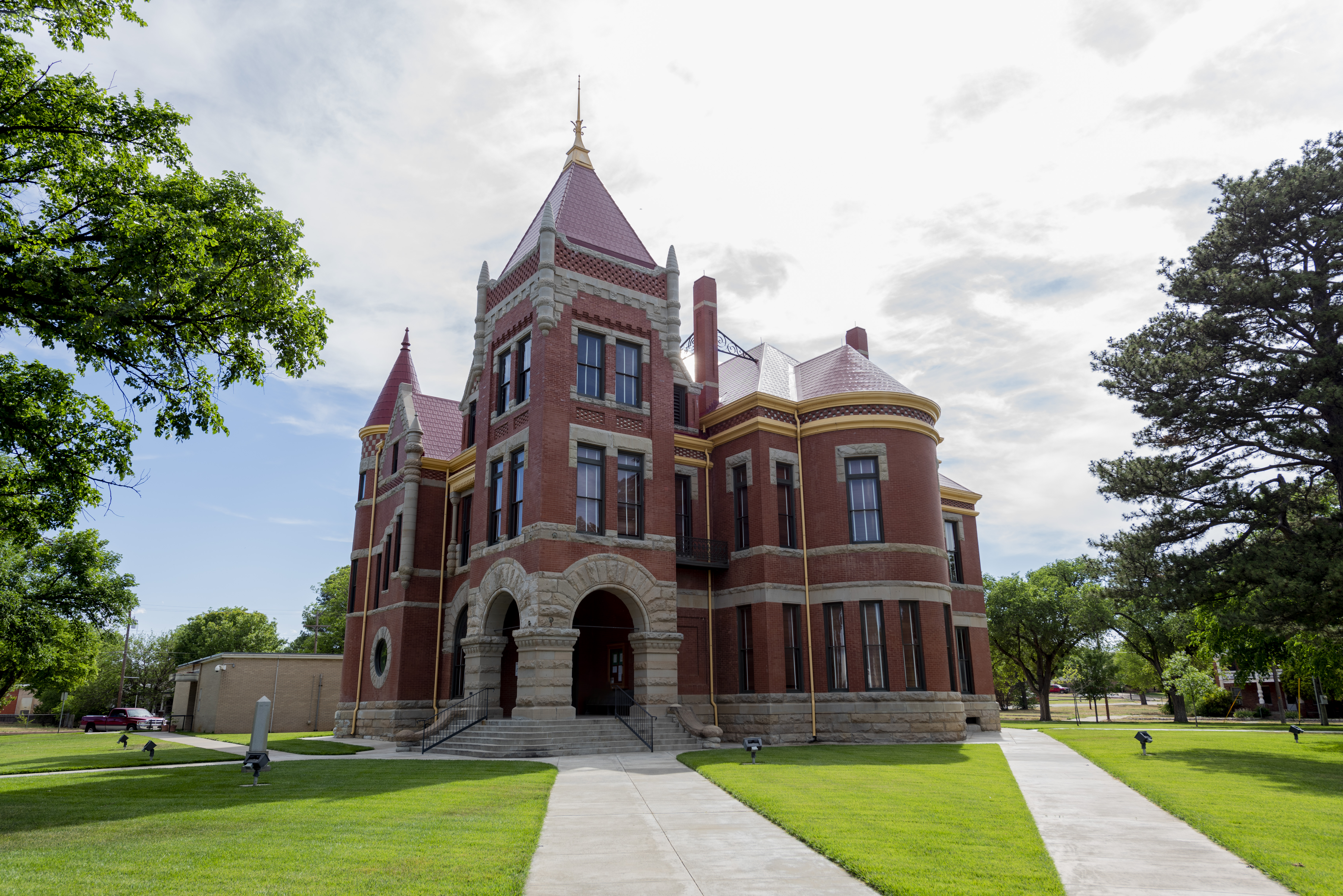
- Donley County Courthouse in 2020

- Location within Texas Location within the United States
- Location: Public Sq., Clarendon, Texas
- Coordinates: 34°56′14″N 100°53′26″W
- Area: 0.2 acres (0.081 ha)
- Built: 1891 (courthouse), 1903 (jail)
- Built by: Troutman Bros., J.A. White
- Architect: Bulger & Rapp, Pauley Jail Building Co.
- Architectural style: Romanesque, Victorian
- NRHP reference No.: 78002924
- TSAL No.: 8200000225
- RTHL No.: 13596

Significant dates
- Added to NRHP: February 17, 1978
- Designated TSAL: January 1, 1981
- Designated RTHL: 2006

The Donley County Courthouse and Jail, on Public Sq. in Clarendon, Texas, was listed on the National Register of Historic Places in 1978. It is also a Texas State Antiquities Landmark and a Recorded Texas Historic Landmark.

The courthouse was designed by architects Bulger & Rapp and was built during 1890–91.

The Pauley Jail Building Co. provided plans and materials for the jail.

== See also ==
- National Register of Historic Places listings in Donley County, Texas
- Recorded Texas Historic Landmarks in Donley County
- List of county courthouses in Texas
