= Zion's German Lutheran Church =

Historic church in Colorado, United States

- U.S. National Register of Historic Places
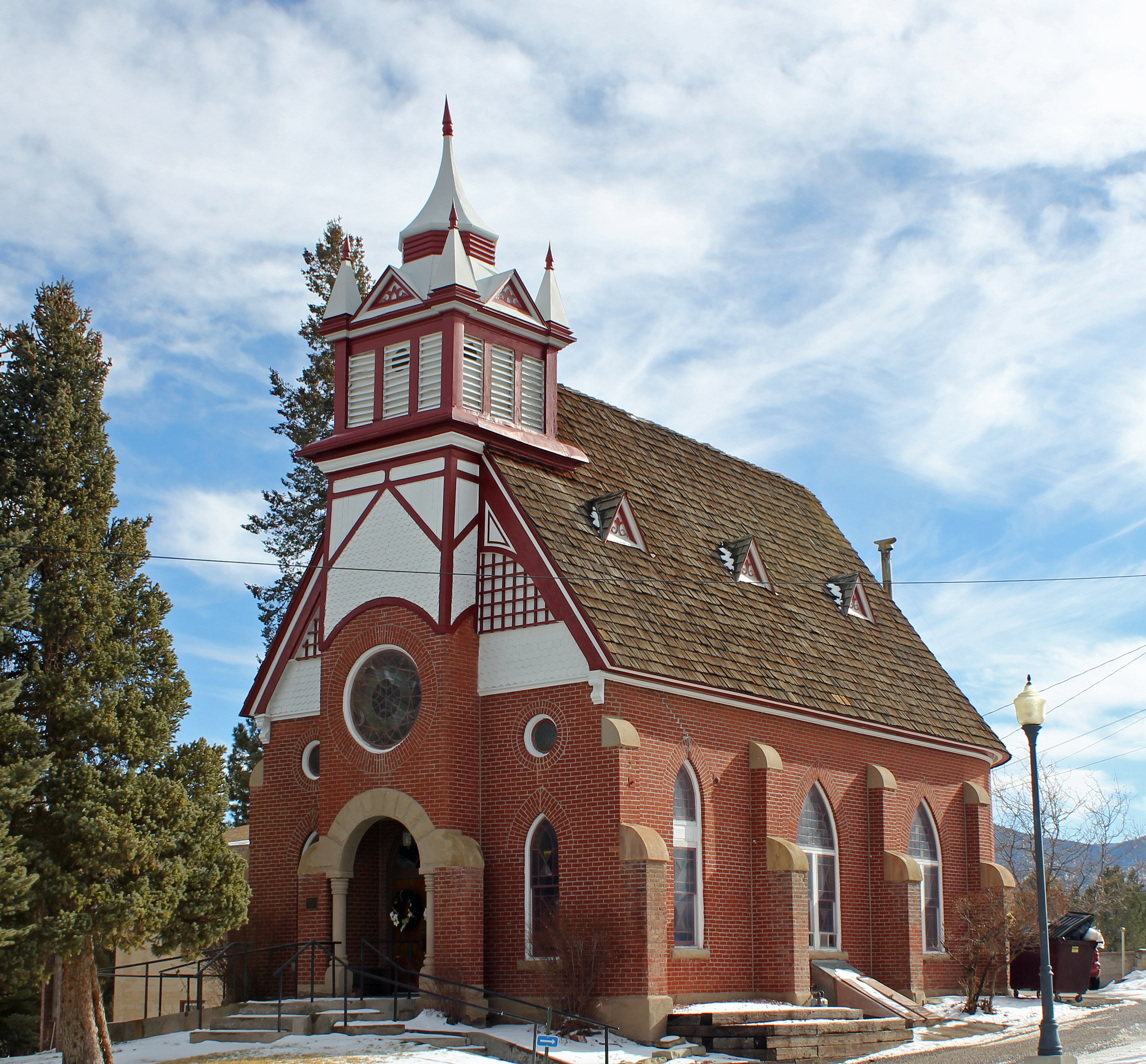

- Location within Colorado Location within the United States
- Location: 510 Pine St., Trinidad, Colorado
- Coordinates: 37°10′24″N 104°30′49″W
- Area: less than one acre
- Built: 1890
- Architect: Isaac Hamilton Rapp; Charles William Bulger
- Architectural style: Late Victorian
- NRHP reference No.: 06000950
- Added to NRHP: October 25, 2006

Zion's German Lutheran Church (Zion's Lutheran Church) is a historic church at 510 Pine Street in Trinidad, Colorado.

It was built in 1890 and was added to the National Register in 2006.

It is 26 by 61 feet (7.9 m × 18.6 m) in plan. It is described in its NRHP nomination as:

a distinctive red brick building with stone trim and a steeply-pitched, wood shingle roof. The building has decorative gabled trim, pointed-arch windows, buttressing, and a central tower/narthex with an elaborate roof and a round arched entry below a large rose window. Stylistically, the eclectic composition almost defies classification. Predominantly Victorian Gothic, the church also possesses elements of other styles from the Late Victorian era, including Romanesque Revival, the Stick Style, and Queen Anne with some Germanic influences.
