= Charles W. Bulger =

American architect

- Born: August 3, 1851; Delphi, Indiana
- Died: June 17, 1922 (aged 70); Dallas, Texas
- Education: Wabash College
- Occupation: architect
- Children: Clarence C. Bulger

Charles William Bulger (August 3, 1851 – June 17, 1922) was an architect in the United States, born in Delphi, Indiana. He worked with Isaac Rapp in Trinidad, Colorado, at Bulger and Rapp for several years, designing many of the city's early buildings. The firm dissolved in 1892.

In downtown Galveston, he designed the E.S. Levy Building in 1896. He designed the Heffron Building (1906), now used as the U.S. Appraiser's Stores, in the Strand-Mechanic Landmark Historic District. In the East End Landmark Historic District he designed 1318 Sealy (1896), 1514 Ball (1897), the Victorian Inn (1900) at 503 17th street, and 1502 Broadway (1906); and in the Silk Stocking Historic District he designed homes on the 1300 and 1400 blocks of 24th Street and Rosenberg. He was also charged with redesigning the Tremont Opera House into Levy Department Store.

He is also credited with designing:

- James Nathaniel Davis House, Galveston, Texas
- Church of the Good Shepherd (Lake Charles, Louisiana)
- Praetorian Building, Dallas, Texas
- Praetorian Building, Waco, Texas

Bulger died in Dallas, Texas on June 17, 1922.

== Buildings attributed to Bulger & Rapp ==
- City Building / Fire House, now the Children's Museum (1889), Trinidad, Colorado
- Temple of Aaron (1889), Trinidad, Colorado
- Zion's German Lutheran Church (1890), Trinidad, Colorado
- First Baptist Church (1891), Trinidad, Colorado
- First National Bank of Trinidad (1892), Trinidad, Colorado, a Richardsonian Romanesque style building.
- Donley County Courthouse and Jail, Clarendon, Texas

== See also ==
- National Register of Historic Places listings in Galveston County, Texas
