= Modern Order of Praetorians =

The Modern Order of Praetorians, sometimes known as The Praetorians, was a fraternal organization founded in Dallas in 1898 or 1899 by Charles B. Gardner, who had formerly worked with the Home Forum and Woodmen of the World. Despite early setbacks the Order thrived and in the early built the Praetorian Building, the first skyscraper in Texas.

Membership was open to men and women, and the Order once had 36,752 benefit members. This was up from 32,800 members at the end of 1919 and approximately 36,000 at the end of 1920. In 1923 the Order was active in Texas, Oklahoma, Kansas, Louisiana, Arkansas, Mississippi, Alabama, Florida, Georgia, Illinois, Colorado, New Mexico and Washington. The administrative organ of the Order was the Supreme Senate at the Praetorian building in Dallas. Local branches were called "Councils", of which there were 599 in 1923. Local officers included a "Sublime Augustus", "Seignor Tribune", "Junior Tribune", "Worthy Attorney", "Worthy Recorder", First and Second "Centurion", "Lygian", "Soothsayer", "Sentinel", "Praetorian Queen", "Worthy Physician" and "Official Musician".

It became a life insurance company in 1957.

== See also ==
- List of general fraternities
- List of North American fraternal benefit orders
