= Praetorian Building =

Stone Place Tower
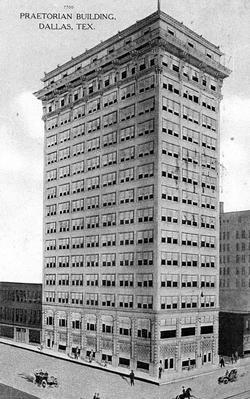
- Depiction of the Praetorian Building on a 1908 postcard
- Interactive map of the Stone Place Tower area
- Alternative names: Praetorian Building

General information
- Status: Demolished
- Type: Commercial offices
- Location: 1607 Main Street; Dallas, Texas
- Coordinates: 32.7811°N 96.7983°W
- Construction started: 1905
- Completed: 1909
- Demolished: 2013

Height
- Roof: 58 m (190 ft)

Technical details
- Floor count: 15

Design and construction
- Architects: Corgan Associates; CW Bulger & Son

The Praetorian Building, also known as Stone Place Tower, was a 15-story, 58 m (190 ft) high-rise constructed in 1909 at Main Street and Stone Street in the Main Street District of downtown Dallas, Texas. It was regarded the first skyscraper in Texas and the first skyscraper in the Southwestern United States. It was among the first skyscrapers built in the entire Western United States, following the 1885 Lumber Exchange Building in Minneapolis, Minnesota and other taller towers in Minneapolis, San Francisco, Omaha, and Kansas City.

However, the Praetorian Building remained the tallest building in Dallas only until 1912. It was 190 feet (58 meters) tall with 15 floors of office space. Plans for its redevelopment were eventually disbanded and the building's deconstruction was completed in the summer of 2013.

== History ==
The Praetorian Tower was conceived as the national headquarters of the Praetorian Order, a fraternal insurance company based in Dallas. The mostly empty plot of land at Main Street and Stone Street had previously hosted the circus, medicine shows and college football events. In 1905 the Order announced a six-story, fireproof building capable of expanding eight additional floors. Months later, plans were changed to the construction of a 15-story building—the first skyscraper in Dallas. Construction began in late 1905 and after several delays the frame of the $800,000 building was complete in 1907 and it finally opened to visitors on February 28, 1909. Designed by C.W. Bulger & Son, its unique neoclassical exterior was fitted with gray granite pillars, gold ornamentation, and terra cotta columns on a brick and steel structural frame, while the interior was finished with African mahogany, tile and marble. The building was heated by steam, featured three modern elevators of the time and contained 2 artesian wells. Each office featured electricity, telegraph and telephone connections and hot and cold running water. A rooftop observatory provided views over the growing city and up to 20 miles (32 km) over rural landscape.

The building remained a center of business activity even as taller skyscrapers opened in following years. The building was air conditioned in 1948. The Order also requested that Stone Street, named after a Dallas Civil War hero, be changed to Praetorian Lane; this was denied by the City in 1952. The Praetorian Order transformed into the Praetorian Mutual Life Insurance Company and in 1958 announced an adjacent 15 story addition and $1.5 million face-lift for the 50-year-old structure. Months later, what had been planned as a general modernization changed to a complete overhaul of the building. The width of the building along Main Street was doubled with the addition, increasing the building tract to 10,000 square feet (930 m^{2}). The historic exterior was stripped down to the steel frame and replaced with a brightly colored "Praetorian Yellow" porcelain steel exterior. The new building, opened in 1961, was designed by Grayson Gill, Inc. and contained 140,000 square feet (13,000 m^{2}) of office space.

Tandy Corp. occupied the building's basement and first two levels with the 21-department "Tandy Craft & Hobby Mart" in the 1960s, but success of the new building was short-lived. The building was sold to off-shore investors in 1970, and Praetorian Mutual Life vacated the building in 1987 for a new location in Las Colinas. The yellow porcelain exterior was painted gray during a 1990s renovation by Corgan. The structure changed hands over successive years and fell into foreclosure; by 1993 low occupancy forced the building to close. It became the 10th office building in a five-block stretch to close its doors during the five-year period of economic hardship for the downtown business district.

=== Redevelopment and demolition ===
As the Main Street District, Dallas and downtown Dallas began a revival and multiple surrounding buildings were rehabilitated, the Praetorian Building was also eyed for renovation. In 2005, the tower was purchased by the California-based 3J Development. The company decided to remodel the tower and restore it to its original 1909 façade. Due to financial problems the renovation was delayed and the building sold in 2007 to Lockey Capital. The building's office floors were planned to be converted into loft apartments. In 2010 the building was one of several in the Main Street District to be purchased by Timothy Headington, developer of The Joule Hotel, with plans for redevelopment. Soon after, the city of Dallas confirmed plans to demolish the building. The building was fully demolished by the summer of 2013, being replaced by a sculpture of an eye.

== See also ==
- List of tallest buildings in Dallas
- Wilson Building
