= Le Crest =

- Commune
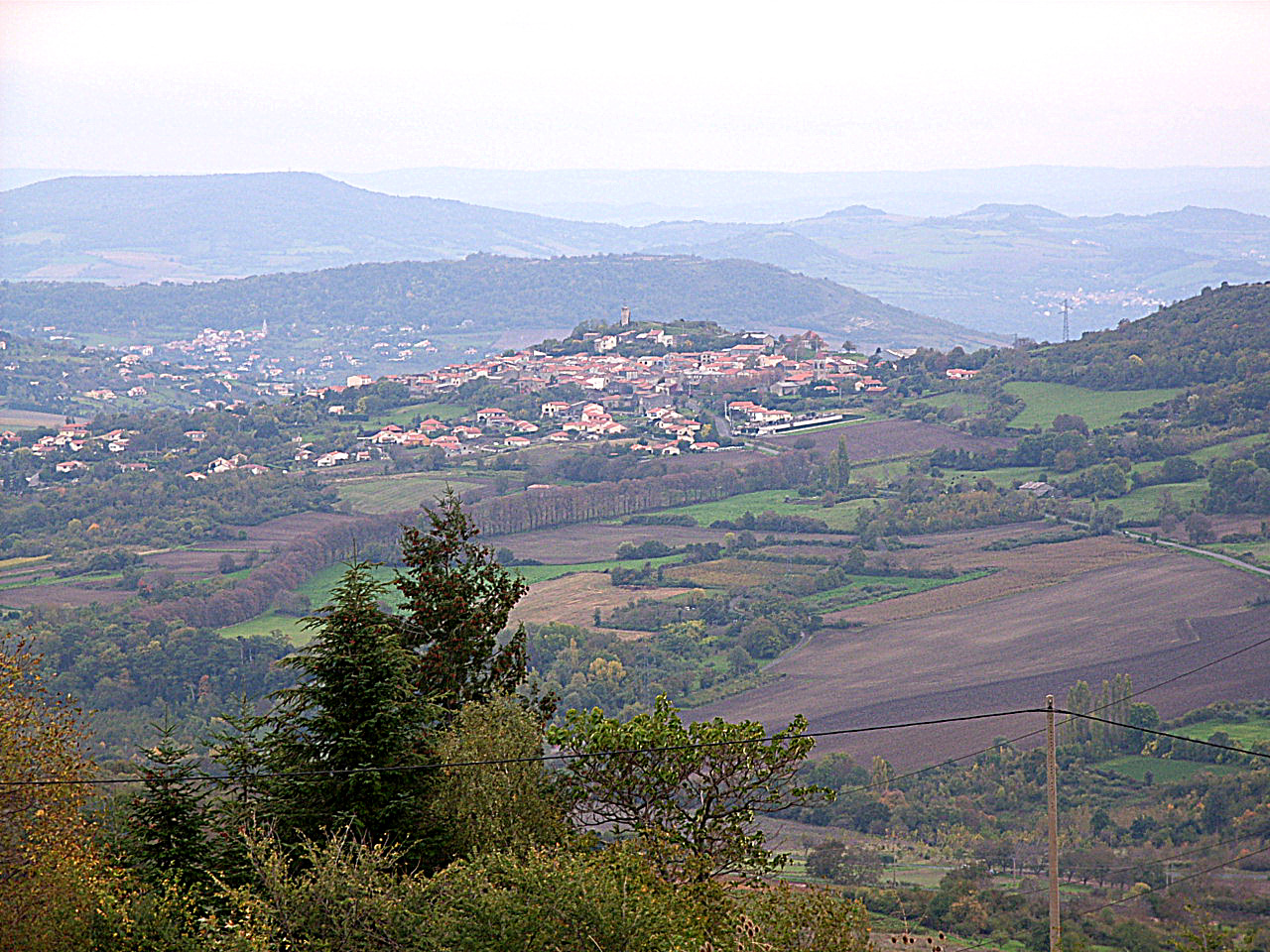
- Le Crest from summit of Puy Giroux

- Coat of arms
- Location of Le Crest
- Location within France Location within Auvergne-Rhône-Alpes
- Coordinates: 45°41′07″N 3°07′39″E
- Country: France
- Region: Auvergne-Rhône-Alpes
- Department: Puy-de-Dôme
- Arrondissement: Clermont-Ferrand
- Canton: Les Martres-de-Veyre
- Intercommunality: Mond'Arverne Communauté

Government
  - Mayor (2020–2026): Gérard Perrodin
- Area^{1}: 6.84 km^{2} (2.64 sq mi)
- Elevation: 608 m (1,995 ft)
- Highest elevation: 653 m (2,142 ft)
- Lowest elevation: 366 m (1,201 ft)
- Population (2023): 1,300
  - Density: 190/km^{2} (490/sq mi)
- Demonym(s): Crestois, Crestoise
- Time zone: UTC+01:00 (CET)
  - Summer (DST): UTC+02:00 (CEST)
- INSEE/Postal code: 63126 /63450
- Website: www.lecrest.fr
- ^{1} French Land Register data, which excludes lakes, ponds, glaciers > 1 km^{2} (0.386 sq mi or 247 acres) and river estuaries.

Le Crest (French pronunciation: [lə kʁɛ]) is a commune in the Puy-de-Dôme department in Auvergne-Rhône-Alpes in central France. It is part of the urban area of Clermont-Ferrand.

Originally, it was a market village in a rural area known for viticulture and other agricultural crops. As in areas of Italy, the ancient village developed around a fortress chateau built on a hilltop for defensive purposes. Dwellings of commoners were built outside the walls of the chateau. The village has a central square with a fountain and a market cross. Agricultural fields extend away from the limits of the village, so the people lived near each other in the village and would travel outside to the fields and vineyards to work.

Anton Docher, a missionary Catholic priest who served for 34 years at Pueblo of Isleta in New Mexico, United States, was born in Le Crest in 1852. He was later known as "The Padre of Isleta."

== In popular culture ==
- The activities of the World War II resistance in Le Crest were the subject of the third series of the 1989 television drama Wish Me Luck.
- Samuel Gance's historical novel, Anton ou la trajectoire d'un père (2013), recounts the adventurous life of Father Anton Docher after he emigrated to the United States. Much of it is set in the village. It describes the life of the wine growers of the 19th century.

== Famous people ==
- Anton Docher, was born in Le Crest. He later became a Catholic missionary who traveled to America and defended the New Mexico natives.
- Jim Rotondi, American jazz trumpeter and flugelhornist, lived in Le Crest. One of his compositions, entitled "Le Crest", is dedicated to the village on his album "Dark Blue" (2016).
- Aurélien Rougerie, rugby team player, capitain of ASM et French champion in 2010 and 2017 lived in Le Crest.

== Gallery ==
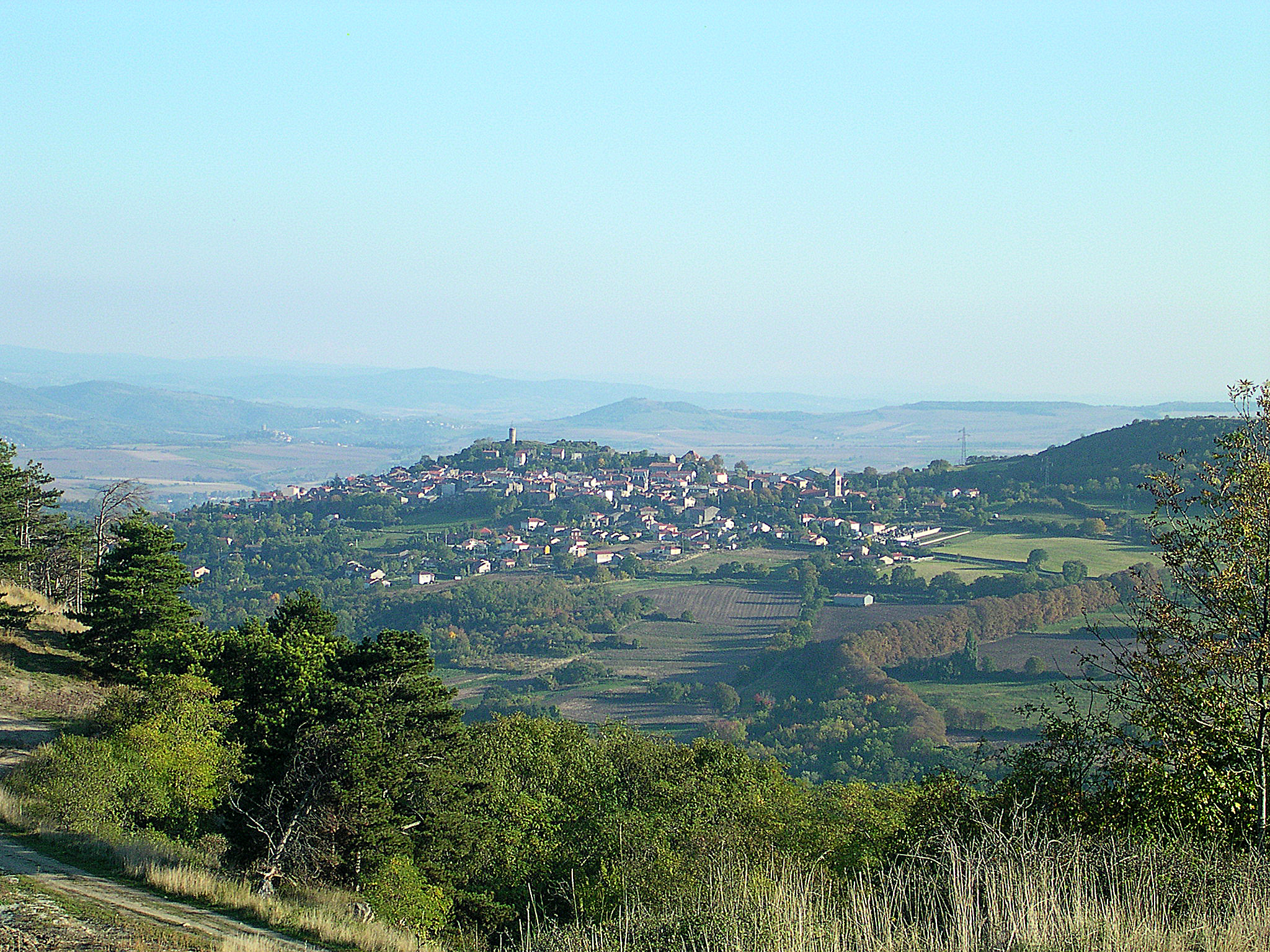
Le Crest, Dec. 2006

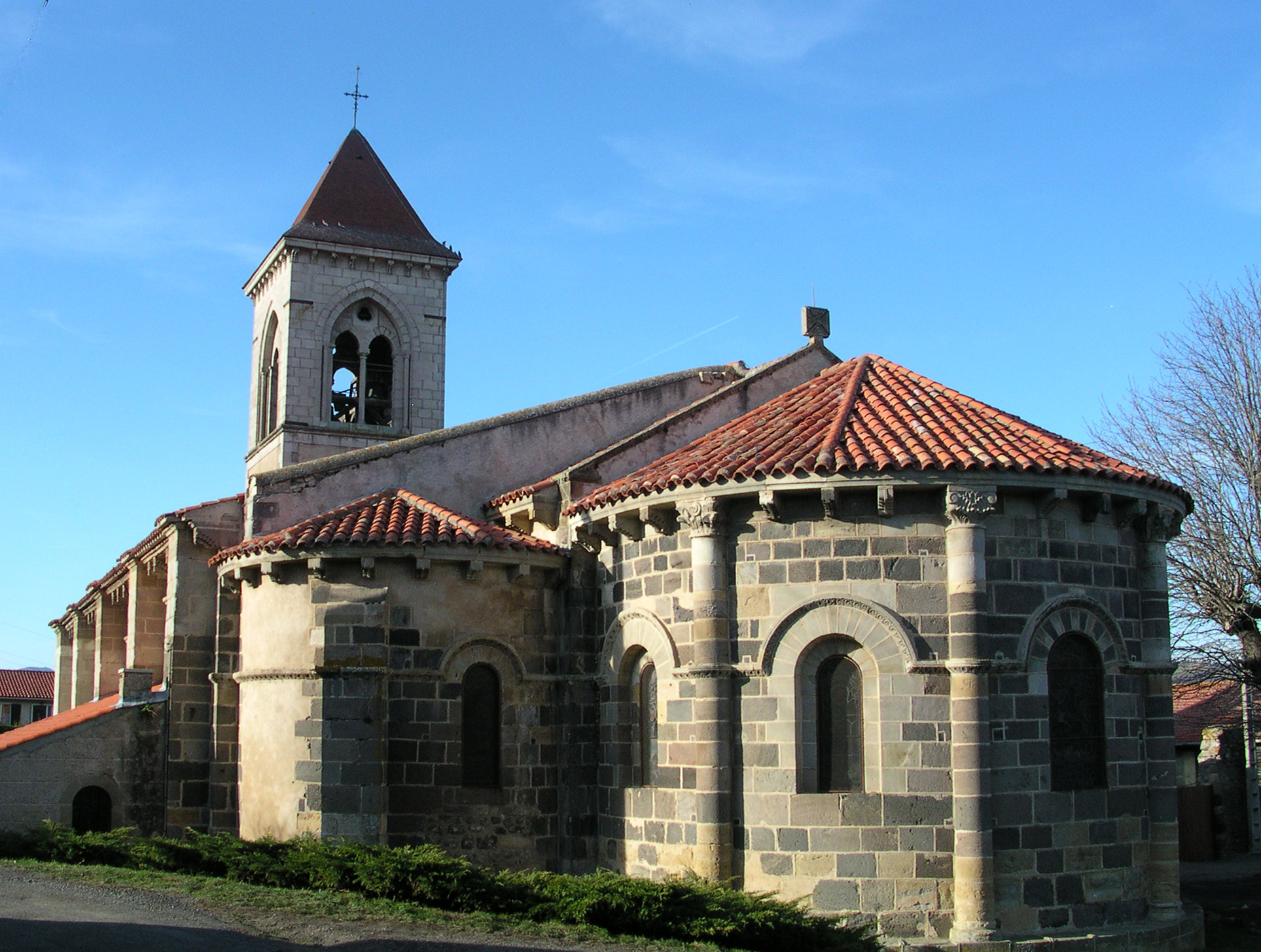
Church in Le Crest

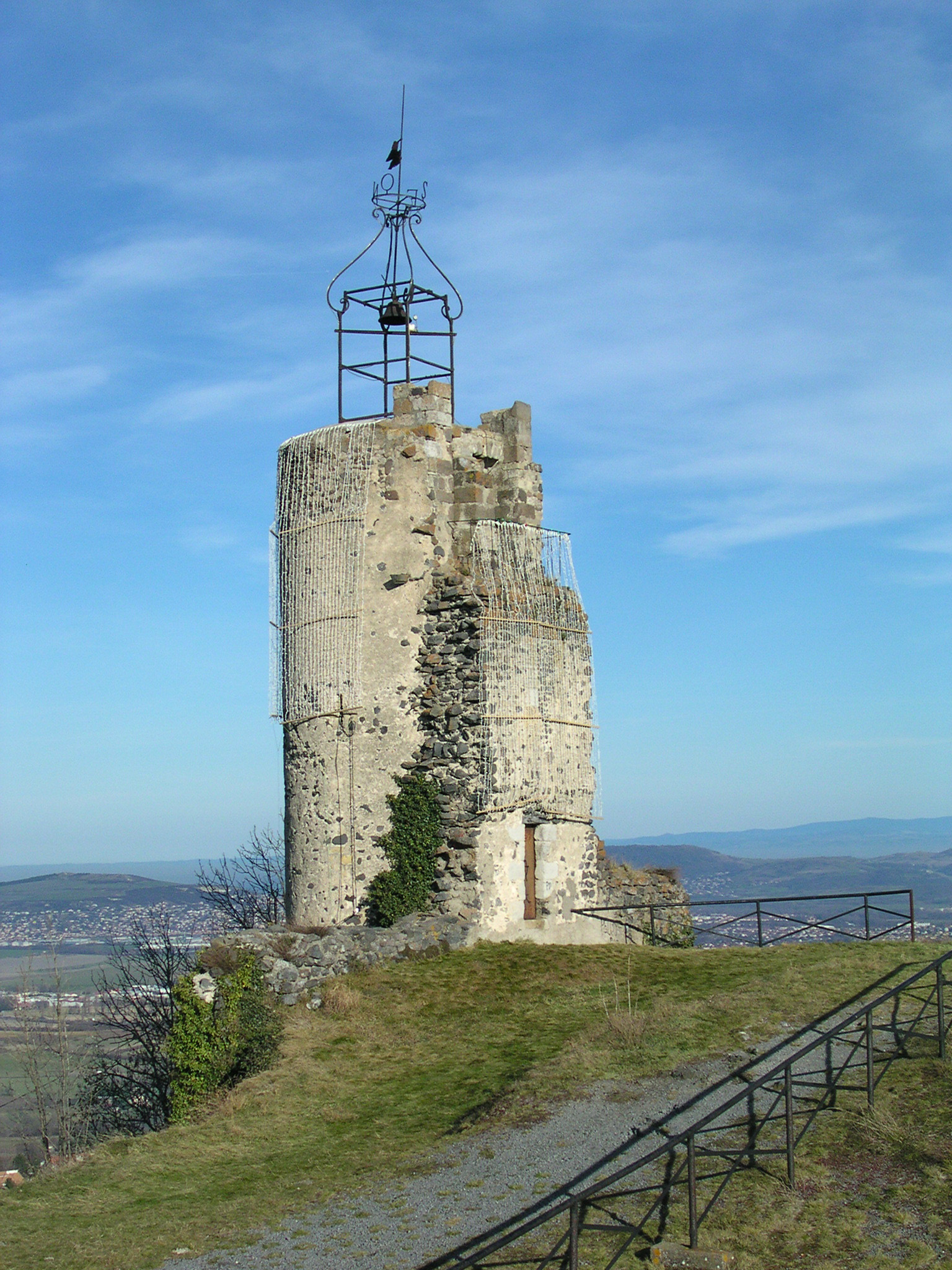
"La tour de l'horloge"

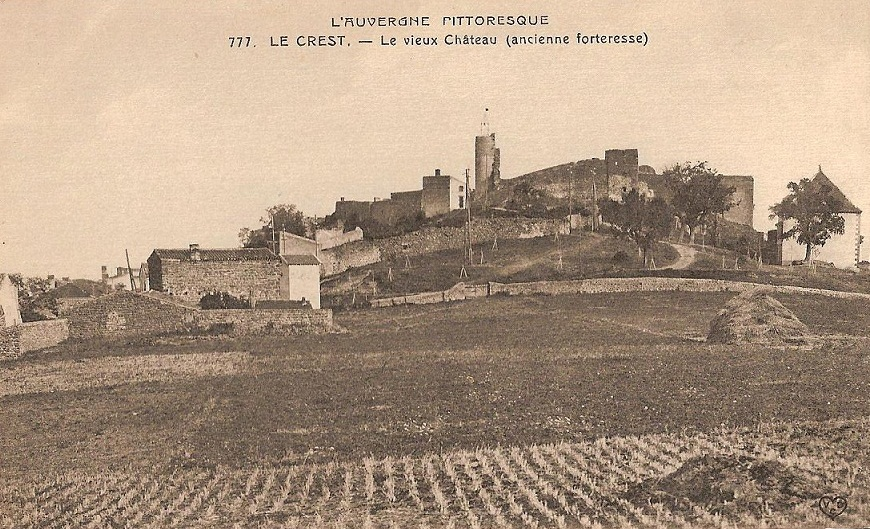
The village about 1900, showing ancient chateau

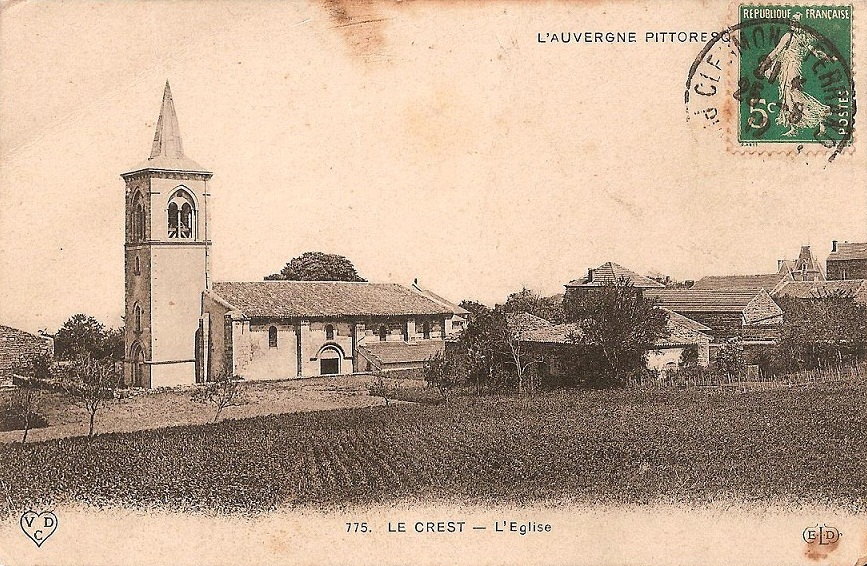
Church c. 1900

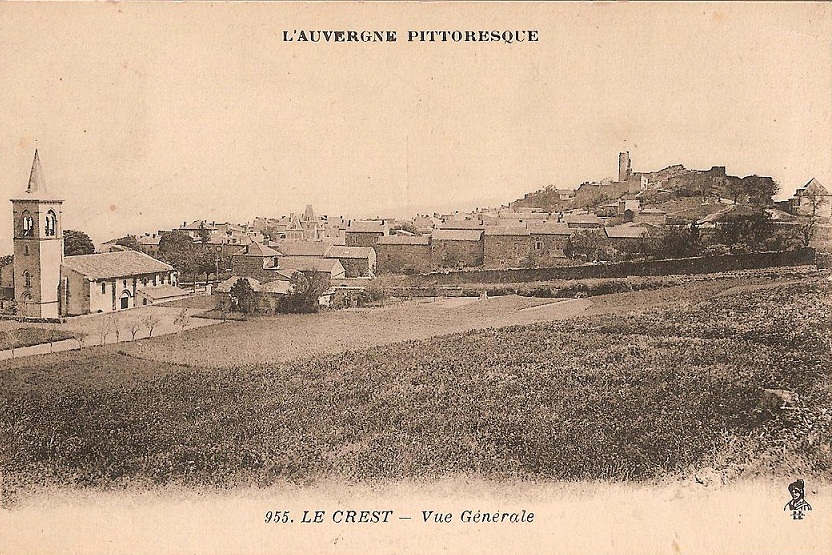
General view

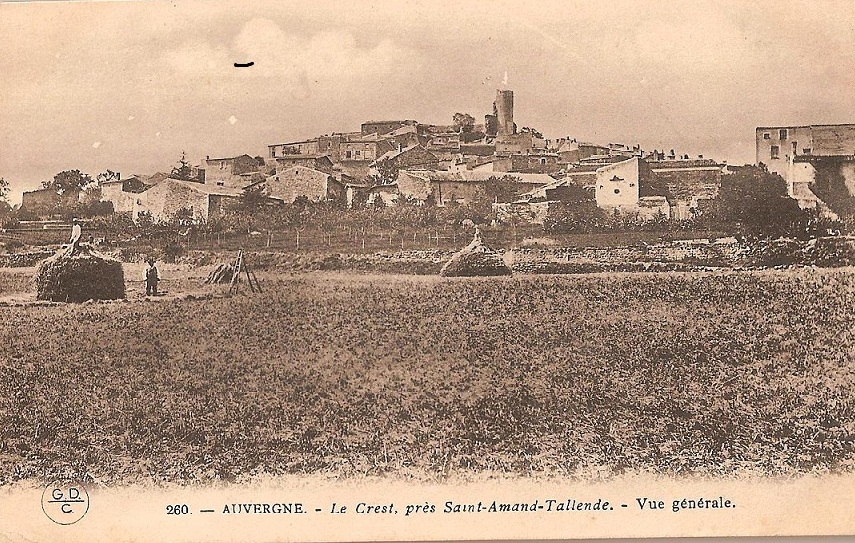
Haying and the village

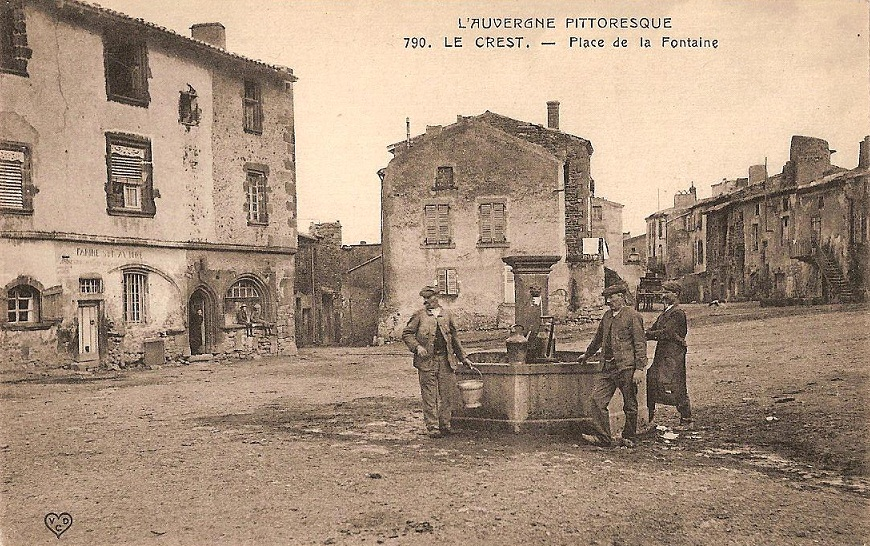
Main square c. 1900

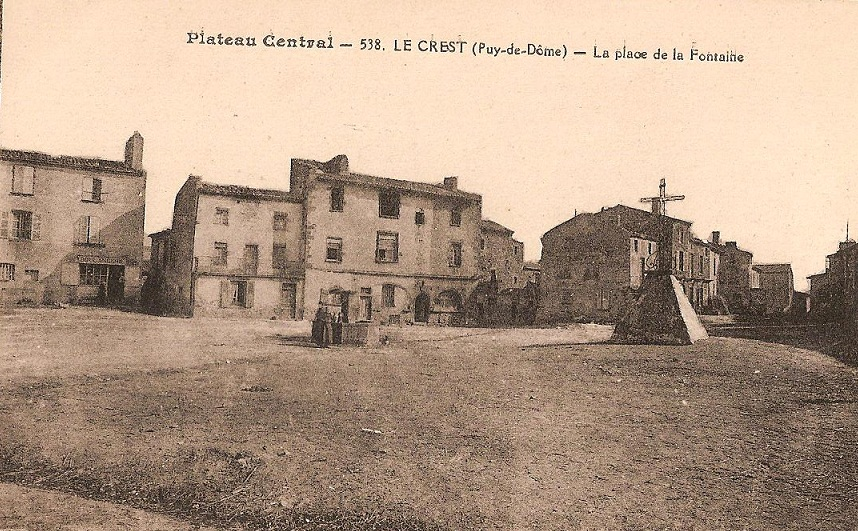
The main square, c. 1900

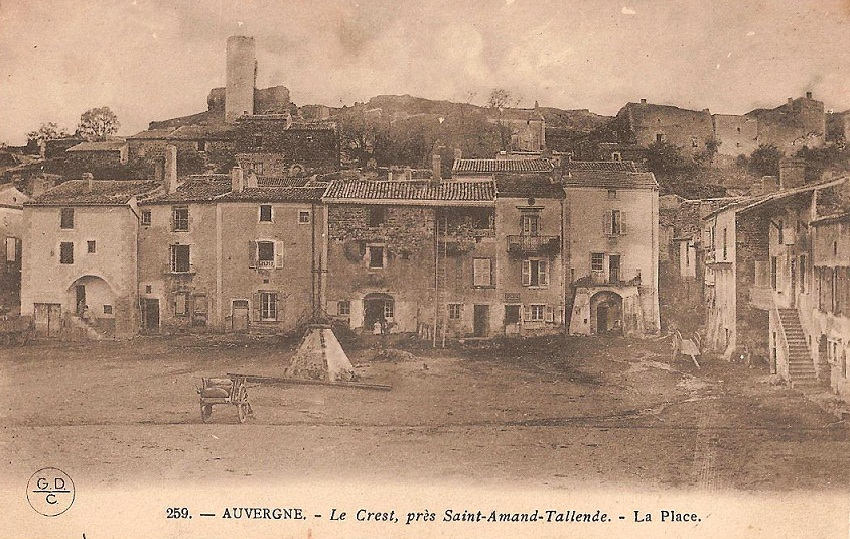
Fountain square and market cross, c. 1900

== See also ==
- Communes of the Puy-de-Dôme department
- Anton Docher
- Jim Rotondi
