= Pablo Abeita =

American politician (1871–1940)

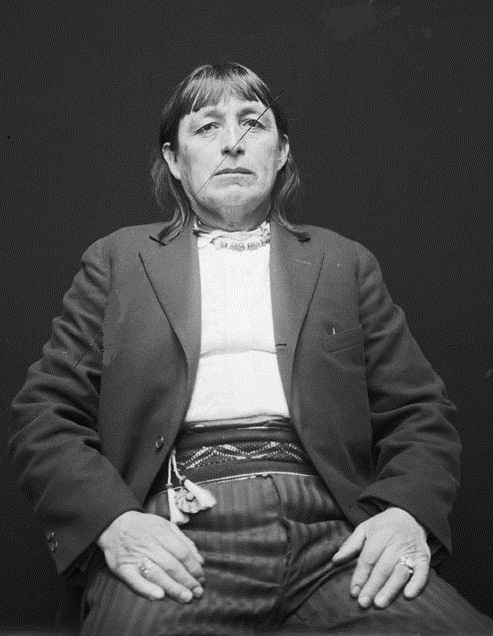
- Born: 1871
- Died: 1940 (aged 68–69)
- Occupation: Politician
- Office: Governor of Isleta Pueblo
- Awards: Order of Leopold

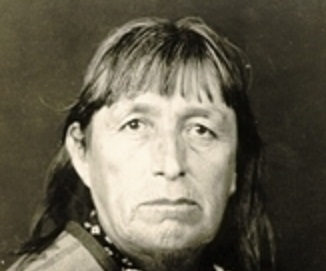
Pablo Abeita, Governor of Isleta

Pablo Abeita (1871–1940) was an American politician who was the governor of Isleta Pueblo in New Mexico, United States, during the decades that Father Anton Docher, known as "The Padre of Isleta," served there.

== Biography ==
Born into a native family of Isleta Pueblo, Abeita grew up speaking Tiwa and English. He was educated in the Jesuit School at Old Albuquerque, then at St Michael's College in Santa Fe. After ten years of formal education, he worked first as a typesetter at the Albuquerque newspaper. He next worked at a family business in Isleta.

In 1889, at the age of nineteen, Abeita was appointed to serve on the All Indian Pueblo Council, which was organized again after a 300-year hiatus during the colonial period. In 1913 Abeita was appointed by the tribe as a judge, and elected Secretary of the All Indian Pueblo Council. The Council became active in the 1920s, trying to forestall government and private efforts to appropriate pueblo lands. They gained passage by Congress in 1924 of the Pueblo Lands Act, which confirmed pueblo title to their lands.

Abeita became friends with Father Anton Docher, a French missionary priest who was assigned in 1891 to the parish church at Isleta Pueblo, and served there until his death in 1928. They were lifelong friends.

In October 1919, Albert I, king of the Belgians, visited Pueblo Isleta with his wife Elisabeth and prince Leopolde, and the royal entourage. He decorated both Governor Abeita and his friend Father Anton Docher, who had served for decades at the pueblo church, with the Order of Leopold of Belgium.

The KiMo Theater, located at 419-423 Central Avenue in Downtown Albuquerque was built in 1927. its owners held a naming contest to raise interest in the new venue. Pablo Abeita won for his suggestion: in Tewa the name KiMo means "mountain lion." Abeita won $50.

Author Joe Sando has appraised Abeita's skills highly, saying that, with his leadership ability, in another era the pueblo governor might well have been elected as a governor of the state of New Mexico. At the time, Native Americans generally did not run for general state offices and were restricted from voting as US citizens if they were members of federally recognized tribes.

When the journalist and ethnologist Charles Fletcher Lummis lived in Isleta, he took a room in Abeita's house. No commercial inns were available.
