= Pueblo of Isleta =

Federally recognized tribe in New Mexico, United States

Pueblo of Isleta Shiewhibak (Southern Tiwa)
- Indian reservation
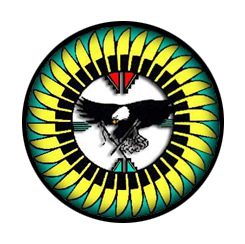
- Seal

- Location of the Pueblo of Isleta
- Country: United States
- State: New Mexico
- County: Bernalillo
- Website: Pueblo of Isleta

- Isleta Pueblo (Shiewhibak)
- U.S. National Register of Historic Places
- U.S. Historic district
- NM State Register of Cultural Properties
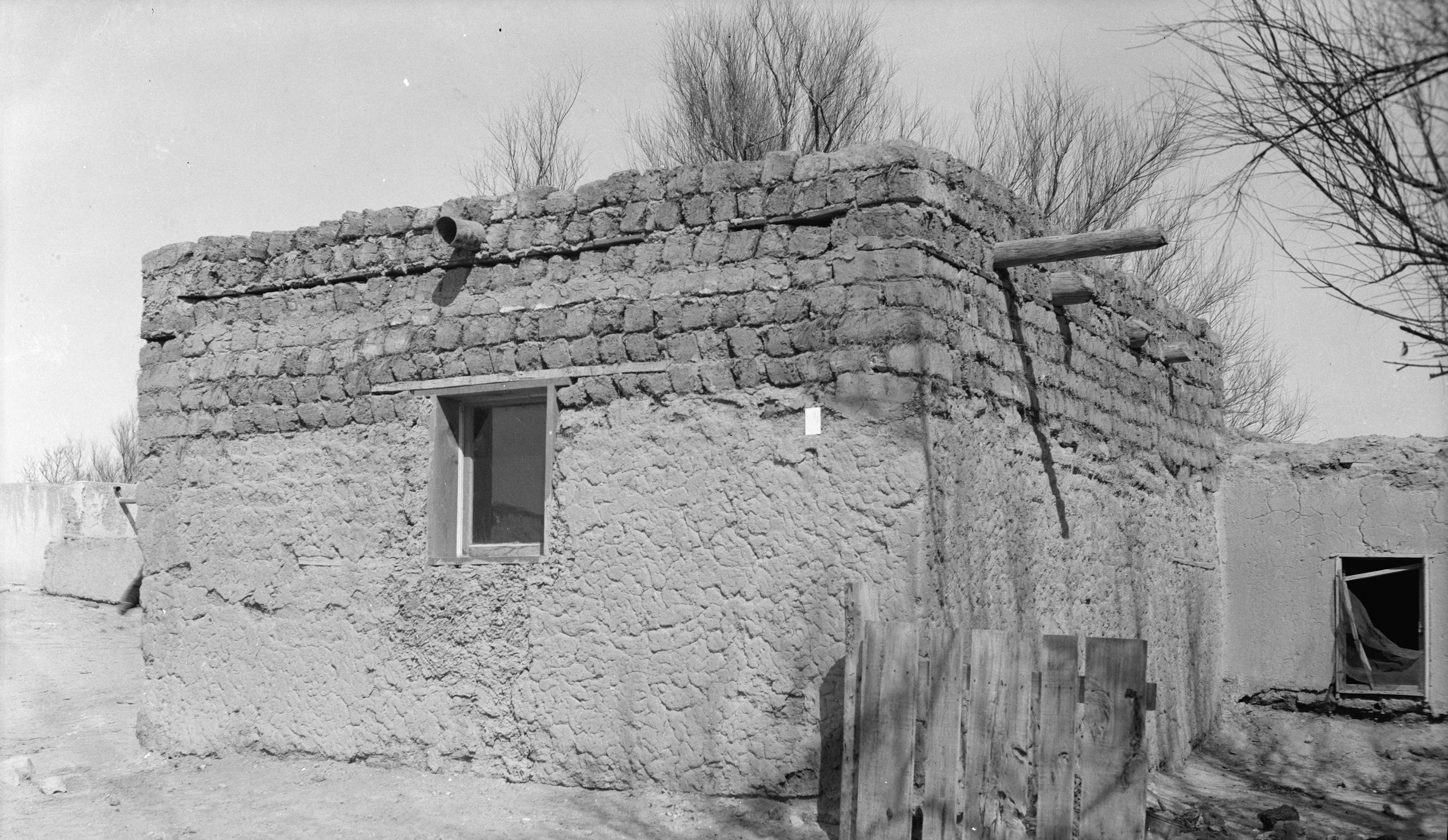
- Ruins at Isleta Pueblo

- Location within New Mexico Location within the United States
- Location: U.S. 85, Isleta, New Mexico
- Coordinates: 34°54′31″N 106°41′30″W
- Area: 211,000 acres (85,000 ha)
- Built: 1613
- Architectural style: Pueblo Style
- NRHP reference No.: 75001162
- NMSRCP No.: 247

Significant dates
- Added to NRHP: September 5, 1975
- Designated NMSRCP: May 5, 1972

Pueblo of Isleta (Southern Tiwa: Shiewhibak) is a federally recognized tribe and an unincorporated community in Bernalillo County, New Mexico, United States. The Tiwa pueblo was originally established in the c. 14th century.

Pueblo of Isleta is located in the Middle Rio Grande Valley, 13 miles (21 km) south of Albuquerque. It is adjacent to and east of the main section of Laguna Pueblo. The pueblo was built on a knife-shaped lava flow running across an ancient Rio Grande channel. The Isleta Pueblo Historic District is listed on the National Register of Historic Places.

== Name ==
The Southern Tiwa name of the Pueblo is Shiewhibak (Shee-eh-whíb-bak), also written [ʃiexʷibʔàg] (Note: "Knife-shaped-Ridge-where-they-play-whib.") meaning "a knife laid on the ground to play whib", a traditional footrace.

The Keres language term for the Pueblo is Western Keres: Dîiw'a'ane or [tîːwˀa̤ʔane], while the Navajo language term is Navajo: Naatoohó or [nɑ̀ːtxòːxó]).

== Land base ==
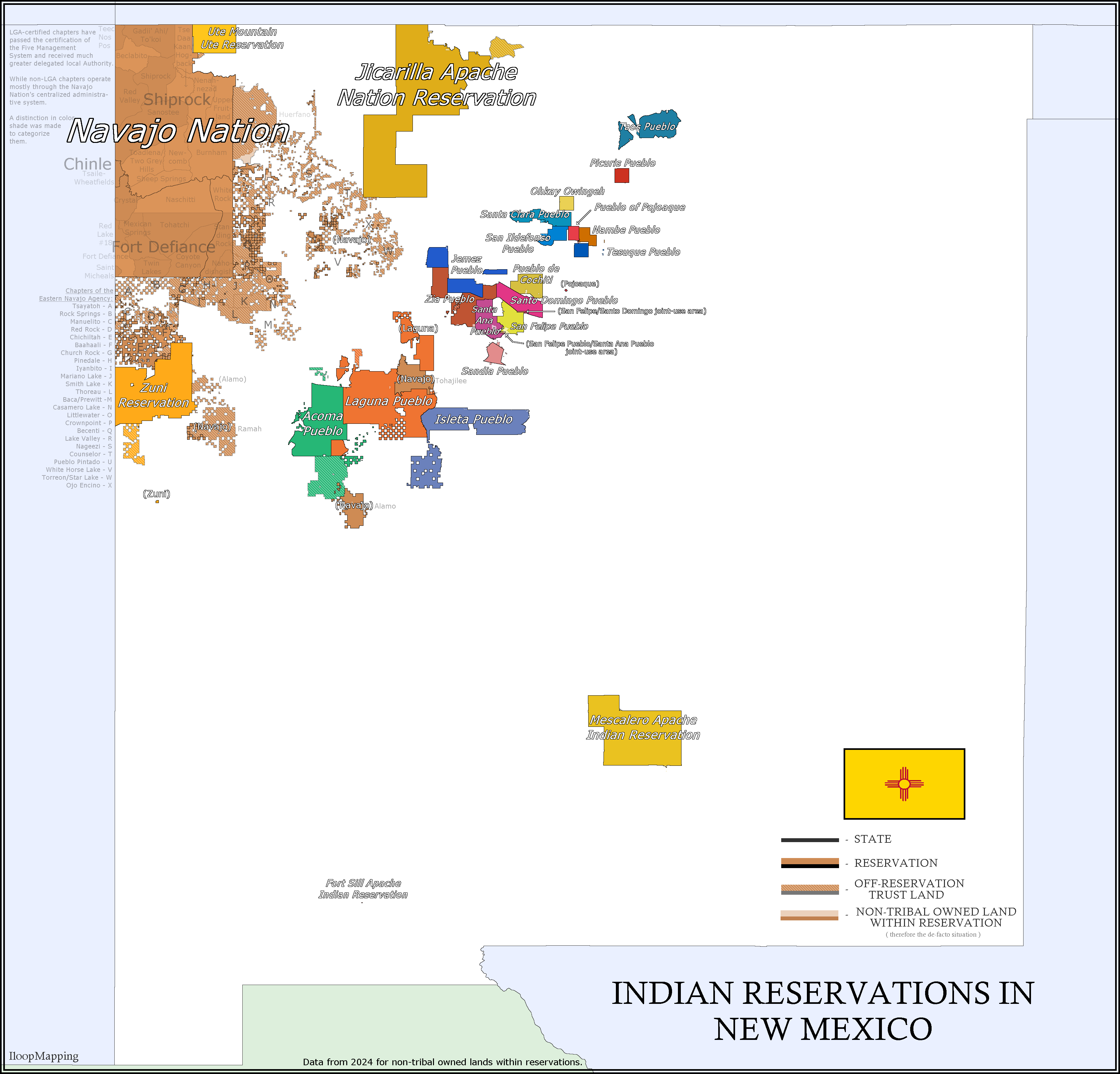
Map of the Isleta and neighboring tribes (In pale blue).

On January 15, 2016, the tribe's officials and federal government representatives held a ceremony to mark the government's taking into federal trust some 90,151 acres of land (140 square miles) which the Pueblo had then purchased. It enlarged their communal territory by 50 percent. The tribe had worked for more than 20 years to acquire this land, once part of their ancestral homeland. It was the largest acquisition of this kind handled under the Barack Obama administration.

== Government ==
The Pueblo of Isleta has democratically elected its tribal leaders since the 1940s. The Isleta constitution was approved on March 27, 1947. There are thirteen articles in the constitution. The Pueblo organizes its government into three branches: executive, legislative, and judicial.

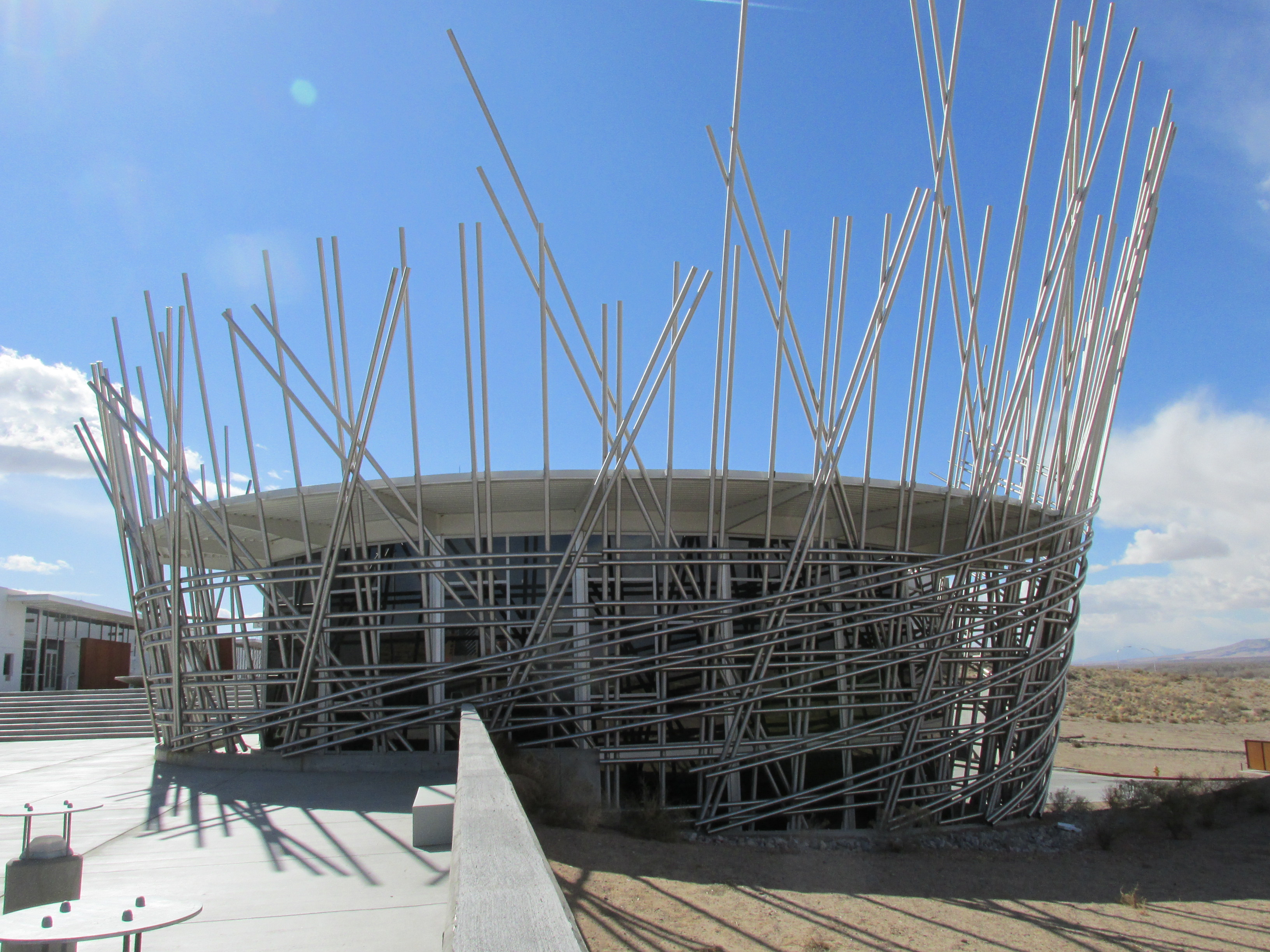
Tribal Council Building at Isleta

=== Governor (Executive branch) ===
The governor is the top executive officer and is elected democratically. In mid-October, nominations are taken, and a general election is held the last Saturday in November. The newly elected governor selects two lieutenant governors, a sheriff, and an under-sheriff to assist during his/her governorship. The governor is bound by Article IV - Executive Branch of the constitution.

The administration in 2025 is: Governor: Eugene Jiron First Lieutenant Governor: Charles Jojola Second Lieutenant Governor: Juan Rey Abeita

=== Tribal Council (Legislative branch) ===
The Isleta Tribal Council has 7 members, each elected for two-year terms. Their duties are outlined within Article V - Legislative Branch of the constitution.

=== Tribal courts (Judicial branch) ===
The governor appoints all tribal judges, who are confirmed by the Tribal Council (offering advice and consent). According to the constitution, Article IX - Judicial Branch, tribal judges are appointed by the governor; and must receive two-thirds (2/3) majority vote by the Isleta Tribal Council to be confirmed. The tribal courts comprise three judges: chief judge and two associate judges. Some of the tribal judges are not law trained. Some members and observers believe that political appointment of tribal judges can cause distrust of the judicial system, if opponents of the governor believe the judges are too influenced by the politics.

=== Historical government ===
Until the early 20th century, the tribe was headed by a cacique, a man selected by elders from a clan with hereditary rights. In addition, the tribe annually elected a governor and assistants. The governor acted as a judge in civil cases; criminal cases were turned over to the federal government. The grand council was made up of all the chiefs, leaders of the pueblo who had gained popular respect. There were distinctions between peace chiefs and those leaders appointed in war.

Father Anton Docher, a French Catholic priest serving for decades at the Pueblo church, described the community in a 1913 article in The Santa Fé Magazine:

A Cacique appointed for life, has the supreme power over his subjects. A governor is elected yearly by the people with two assistants, and occasionally a grand council meets. The governor is the judge in civil cases only (criminal cases are transferred to the district courts). A war captain and other officials have charge of the various celebrations and dances, such as the "dance of the kings" in January, the "tortoise dance" in February ...

== Economy ==
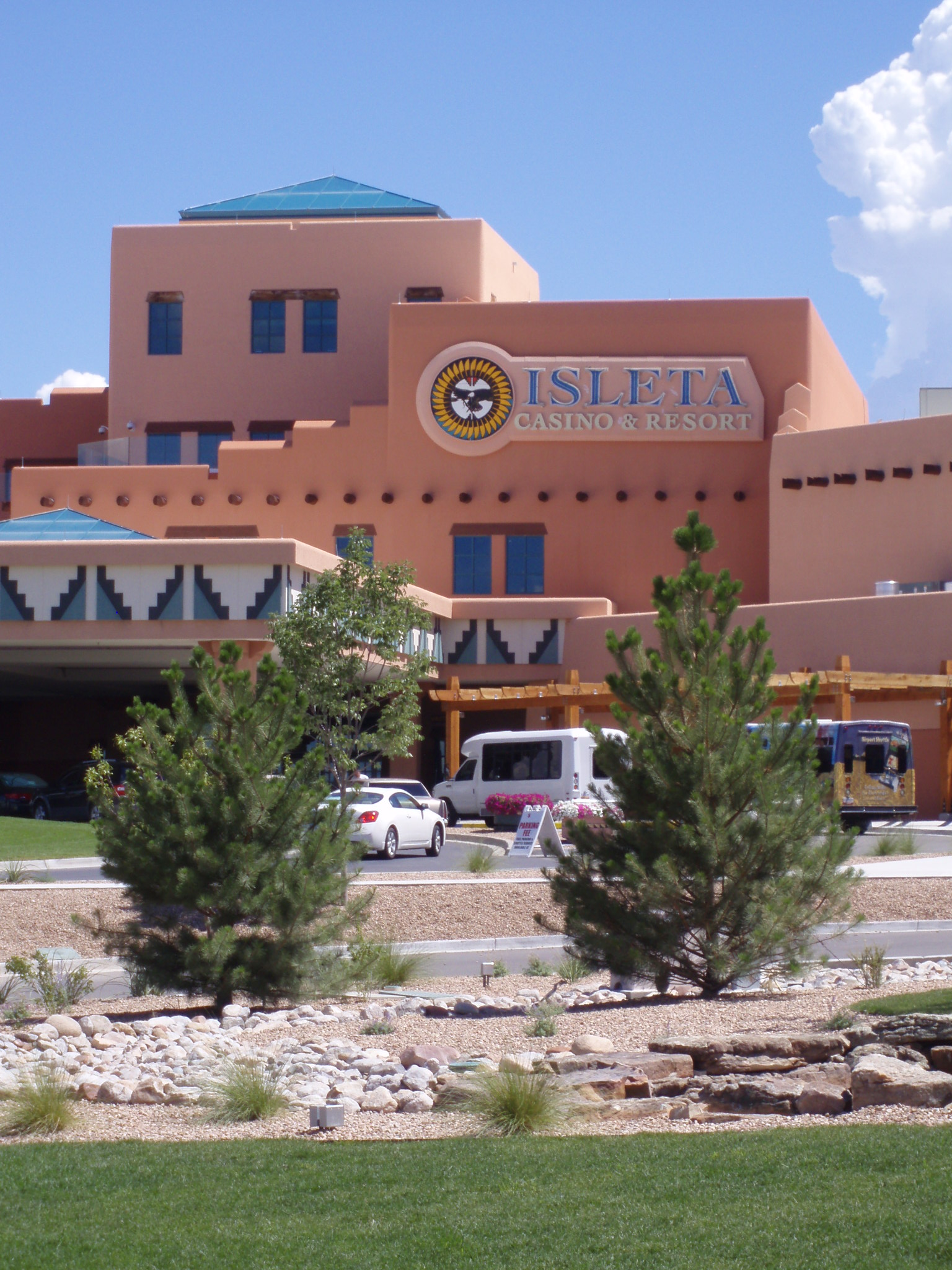
Isleta Lakes Recreational Complex and tribal casino

In addition to the cattle ranch, Pueblo of Isleta owns and operates the Isleta Resort Casino which is one of the larger New Mexico casinos, the Eagle Golf Course, and the Isleta Lakes Recreational Complex. The Isleta Resort Casino is accessible via the New Mexico Rail Runner Express, a commuter rail line from Belen to Santa Fe, at Isleta Pueblo station. The casino has naming rights to the Isleta Amphitheater.

== Culture ==
=== Language and ethnicity ===
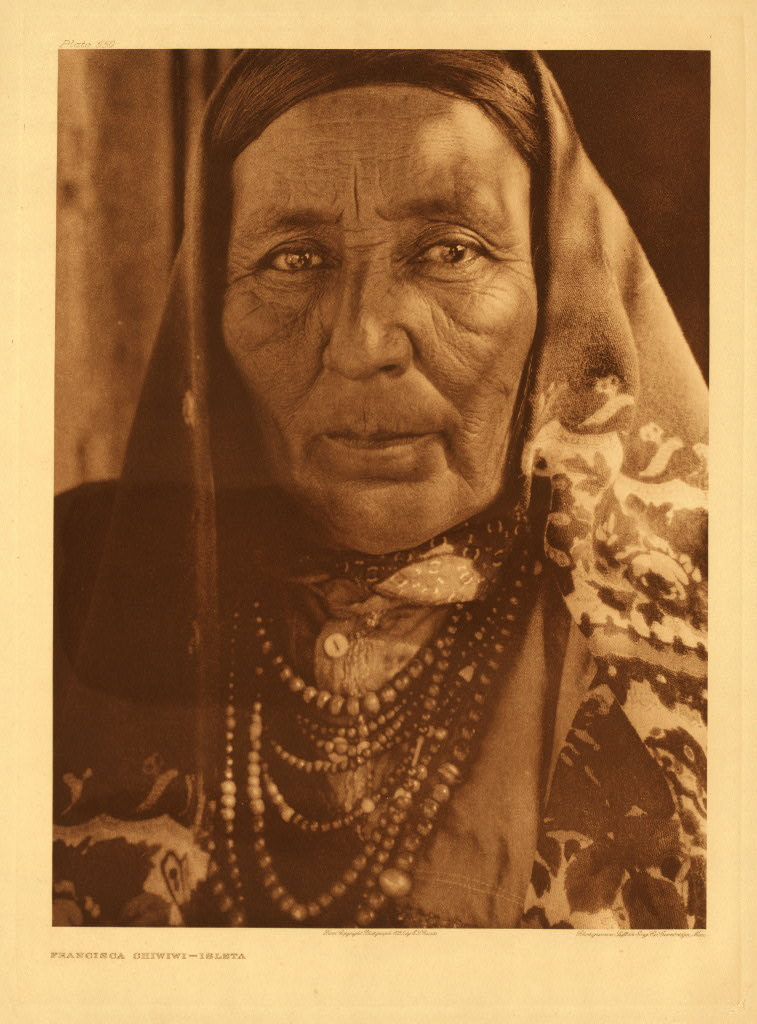
Francisca Chiwiwi, Isleta Pueblo, circa 1925. Photo by Edward Curtis.

Vicente Jiron, Isleta.

Isleta woman.

The population of Pueblo of Isleta consists mostly of the Southern Tiwa ethnic group (Spanish: Tigua). The inhabitants of the Pueblo traditionally speak Isletan Tiwa, one of the two varieties of the Southern Tiwa language, part of the Tanoan branch of the Kiowa-Tanoan language family. The other Southern Tiwa variety is spoken at Sandia Pueblo, whereas Northern Tiwa is spoken at Taos and Picuris Pueblos.

In August 2015, the tribe announced that the Tiwa language would be taught to children at Isleta Elementary School, following the school's transfer from federal to tribal control. In 2016 the Kellogg Foundation made grants totaling $148,000 for development of the dual language Tiwa-English program for young children at the school.

=== Traditional cultural practices ===
Anthropologists have divided Pueblo groups into two distinct groups based on cultural practices: the Western Pueblo Groups and the Eastern Pueblo Groups. Isleta is considered an Eastern Pueblo according to this classification, derived largely on their subsistence farming techniques. Traditionally, Eastern pueblos rely more heavily on irrigation techniques, in contrast to dry farming practices that were more common in the Western Pueblos. Both groups cultivate mostly maize (corn), but squash and beans have also been staple Pueblo foods all around the region.

Other scholars classify the pueblos into three cultural groups: the Western, Eastern, and Keresan (or Central) Pueblo groups. In either system, Pueblo of Isleta is considered an Eastern Pueblo group. The adjacent Laguna Pueblo is a Central—Keresan Pueblo group.

==== Social organization ====
Isleta (and the Sandia) have matrilineal kinship systems, with descent and inheritance traced through the mother's family; the children are considered born to her people and receive their status from her family or corn group, akin to a clan. They have an endogamous system of marriage. These kinship/cultural divisions are connected with the sacred directions and colors, as well as tribal lineages, clans, phratries, and moieties. In the moiety system, one moiety is connected with winter practices, and the other with the summer practices and traditions.

==== Religious practices ====
The tribe maintains and operates a kiva as sacred space for particular rituals and ceremonies. The traditional religion involves the cult of the Kachinas, spiritual beings that personify various aspects of the immaterial and natural worlds. The kachina concept has three different aspects: the supernatural being, the kachina dancers (masked members of the community who represent kachinas at religious ceremonies), and kachina dolls, small dolls carved in the likeness of Kachinas given as gifts to children. The cult of the Kachinas may have spread eastwards to Isleta from the Western Pueblos through Laguna, in which Kachinas have been a part of the traditional religion for longer.

== History ==
=== 17th century ===
When the Spanish arrived in the late 1500s they named the village Isleta, Spanish for "little island". The Spanish Mission of San Agustín de la Isleta was built in the pueblo in 1613 by the Spanish Franciscan friar Juan de Salas. He tried to teach the people about Catholicism and western ways of cultivating plants.

During the Pueblo Revolt of 1680, many of the pueblo people fled to Hopi settlements in Arizona, while others followed the Spanish retreat south to El Paso del Norte (present-day Ciudad Juarez). After the rebellion, the Isleta people returned to the Pueblo, many with Hopi spouses.

=== 19th century ===
In the 1800s, friction with members of Laguna Pueblo and Acoma Pueblo, who had joined the Isleta community, led to the founding of the satellite settlement of Oraibi. In the 21st century, Isleta includes the main pueblo, as well as the small communities of Oraibi and Chicale.

On October 21, 1887, the French missionary Father Anton Docher traveled to New Mexico, where he was assigned as a priest in the Cathedral of Santa Fé. After three years in Santa Fé and one in Taos, he was assigned to Isleta, arriving on December 28, 1891. There, he met Adolph Bandelier and Charles Fletcher Lummis, who became long-term friends. Young Pablo Abeita (no relation to Diego or Louise Abeita) had recently been selected as Governor of Isleta, continuing into the 1930s.

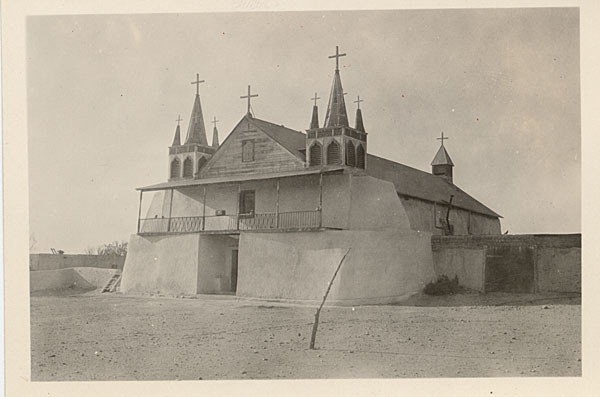
Adobe San Agustín de la Isleta Mission, with wooden Gothic Revival elements introduced by Padre Anton Docher, shown in 1925.

Father Anton Docher served for 34 years in the historic St. Agustin Mission Church until his death in 1928. He is buried near the previous priest, Padre Padilla, near the altar of the church in Isleta. (Built by the Tiwa under direction of a Spanish missionary in 1612, the church is one of the oldest in the United States.)

=== 20th century to present ===
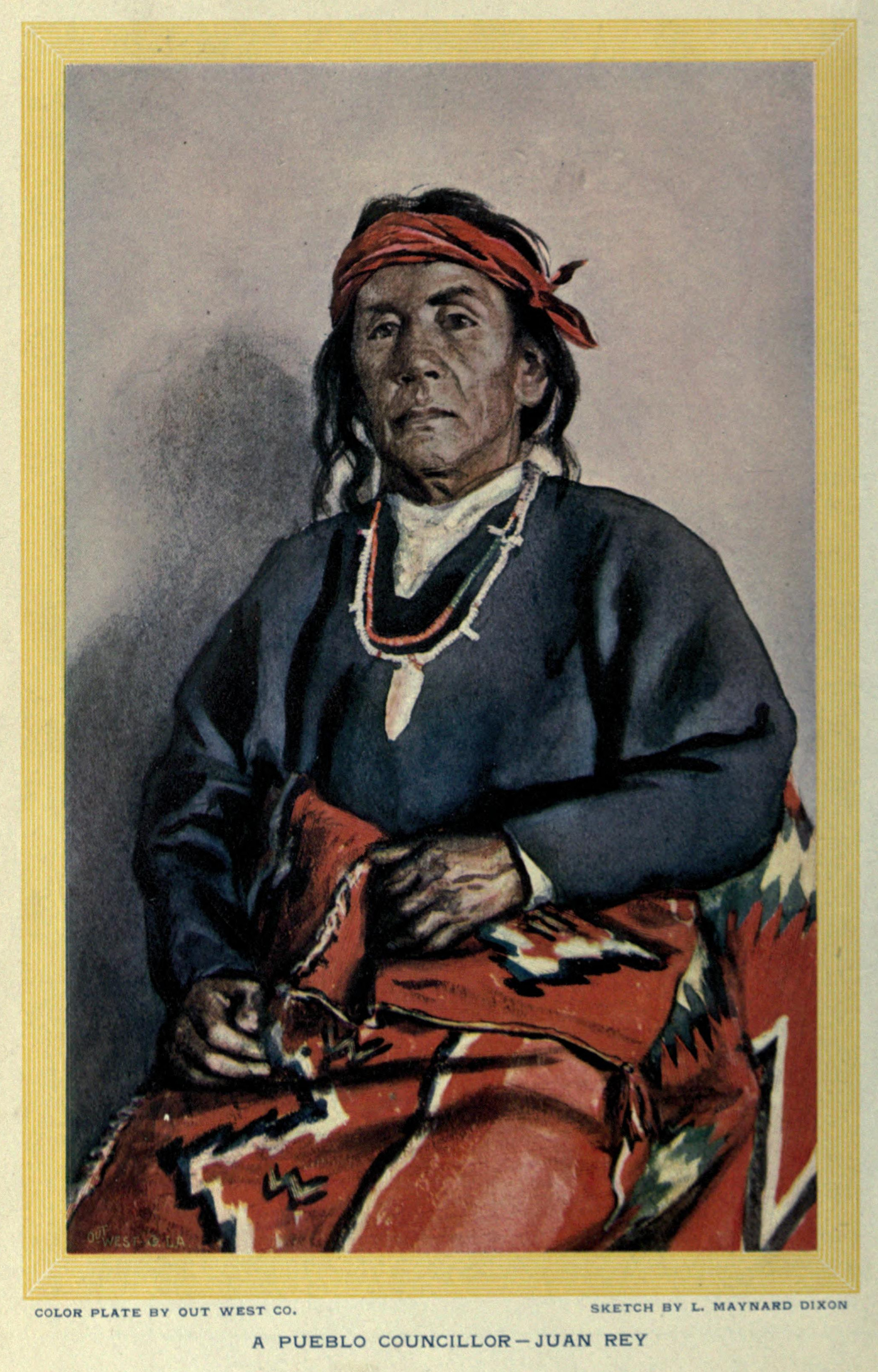
1903 painting of Pueblo of Isleta councillor Juan Rey Abeita.

On October 26, 1919, the King of Belgium Albert I, together with Queen Elisabeth of Belgium and Prince Léopold, journeyed to Isleta during their official visit to the United States. The King decorated Pablo Abeita, Governor of the Pueblo, and Father Anton Docher with the Order of Léopold. Abeita gave the king a turquoise cross mounted in silver made by the Isletans. 10,000 people journeyed to Isleta for this grand visit by European royalty.

Abeita was appointed by the tribe to the Council of All Indian Pueblos, which was active in the 1920s to resist United States government political takeover of its lands. The Pueblo had an unusual land title, as the Spanish had a tradition of affirming indigenous title. When the United States took over the Southwest in 1848 following the Mexican War, it promised by treaty to preserve Spanish-Mexican titles. Abeita and other Pueblo leaders organized to raise awareness of these terms; they gained passage of the Pueblo Lands Act of 1924 by the US Congress, which affirmed their indigenous title.

But, through takeovers by Europeans and the United States, the Pueblo continued to lose lands. Some land claims were affirmed by court cases through the 20th century (see Aboriginal title in New Mexico). Beginning in the late 20th century, the tribe's leaders have worked to buy back lands to re-establish their homeland territory.

In the mid-2010s, Pueblo leaders purchased 90,151 acres (140 square miles) of land that was once part of the tribes’ aboriginal homeland, at a cost of approximately US$7.3 million. In January 2016, the secretary of the interior joined the Governor of the Pueblo to celebrate the federal government placing this large parcel of land into trust on behalf of the Pueblo. The addition increased the Pueblo's territory by 50%. The land is primarily located within what is known as Comanche Ranch, and is one of the Pueblo's profitable businesses, where they run 1,000 head of cattle.

The population was approximately 4,000 people and the tribe owns 211,000 acres of land.

== Education ==
The portion of Isleta Pueblo in Bernalillo County is zoned to Albuquerque Public Schools.

The Bureau of Indian Education operates Isleta Elementary School in an unincorporated area west of the CDP. The current facility opened in 2006.

The public library is the Isleta Pueblo Library.

== See also ==
- Ancient Pueblo peoples
- Puebloan peoples
- San Agustín de la Isleta Mission

== Bibliography ==
- Samuel Gance, Anton ou la trajectoire d'un père, L'Harmattan, Paris, 2013, 208 p. ISBN 978-2336290164
- Julia M. Keleher and Elsie Ruth Chant, The Padre of Isleta: The Story of Father Anton Docher, Sunstone Press Publishing, 2009 (first published 1940). [ for more information ]
- Mooney, James (1910). "Isleta Pueblo" . Catholic Encyclopedia. Vol. 8.
