= Yves Morvan =

French archeologist and art restorer (born 1932)

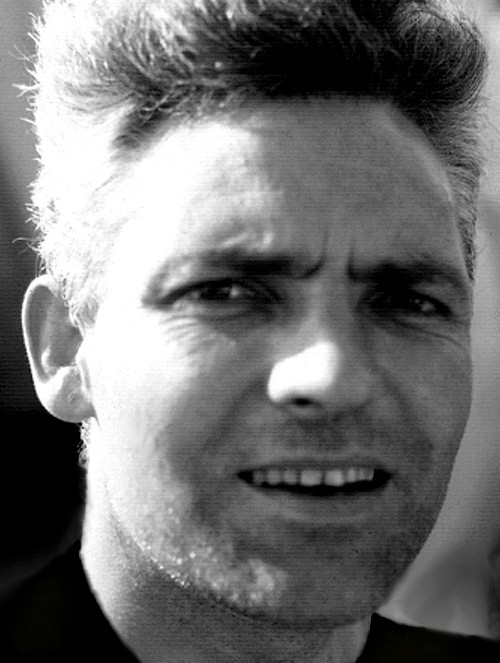
Yves Morvan in the 1970s

Yves Morvan (French:iv moʁɑ̃; born January 13, 1932, in Uzel) is a French archaeologist, specialist of the romanesque art and of the iconography of Blaise Pascal. He is also a restorer, sculptor of religious characters, as well as member of the Academy of Science, Literature and Arts of Clermont-Ferrand. He is the father of the novelist Philippe Morvan.

== Biography ==
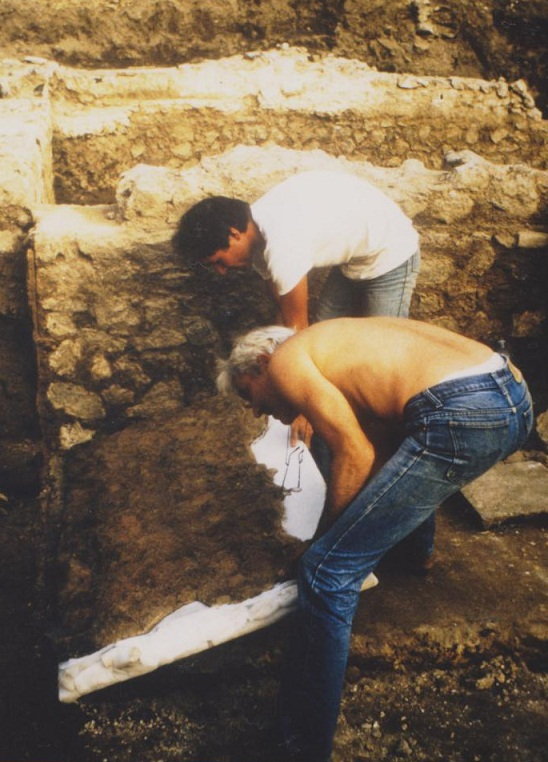
Yves Morvan operating a removal of Gallo-Roman mural during excavations led by a team of the CNRS in 1986

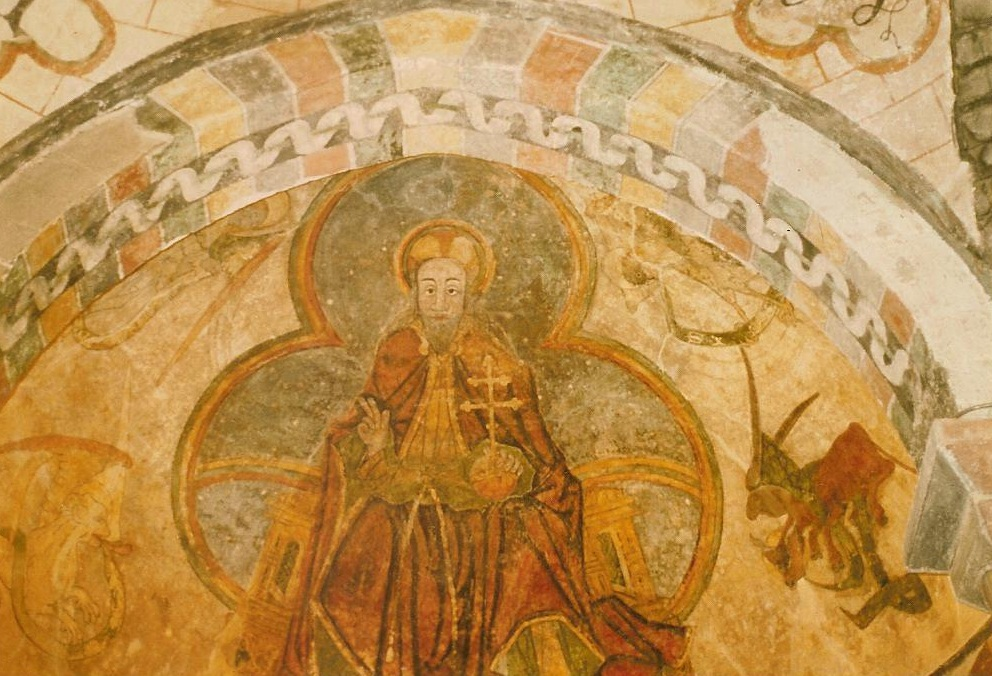
Christ in Majesty in Jaleyrac

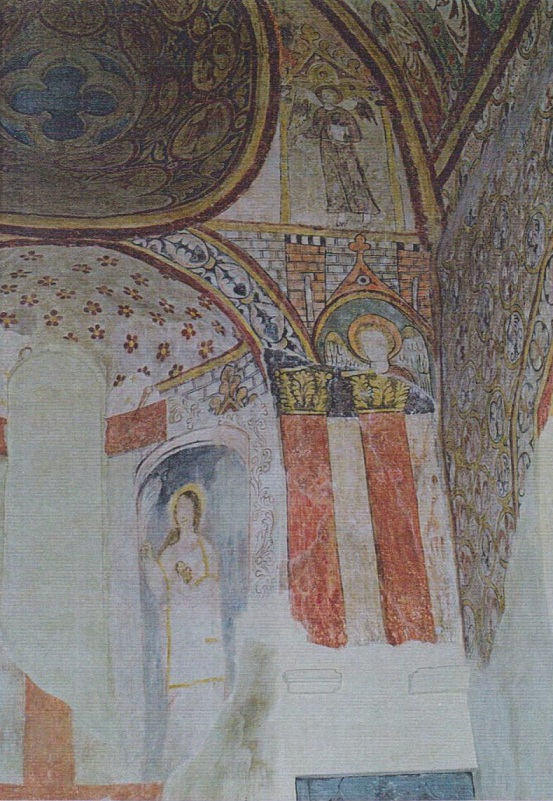
Murals of the church of Pignols

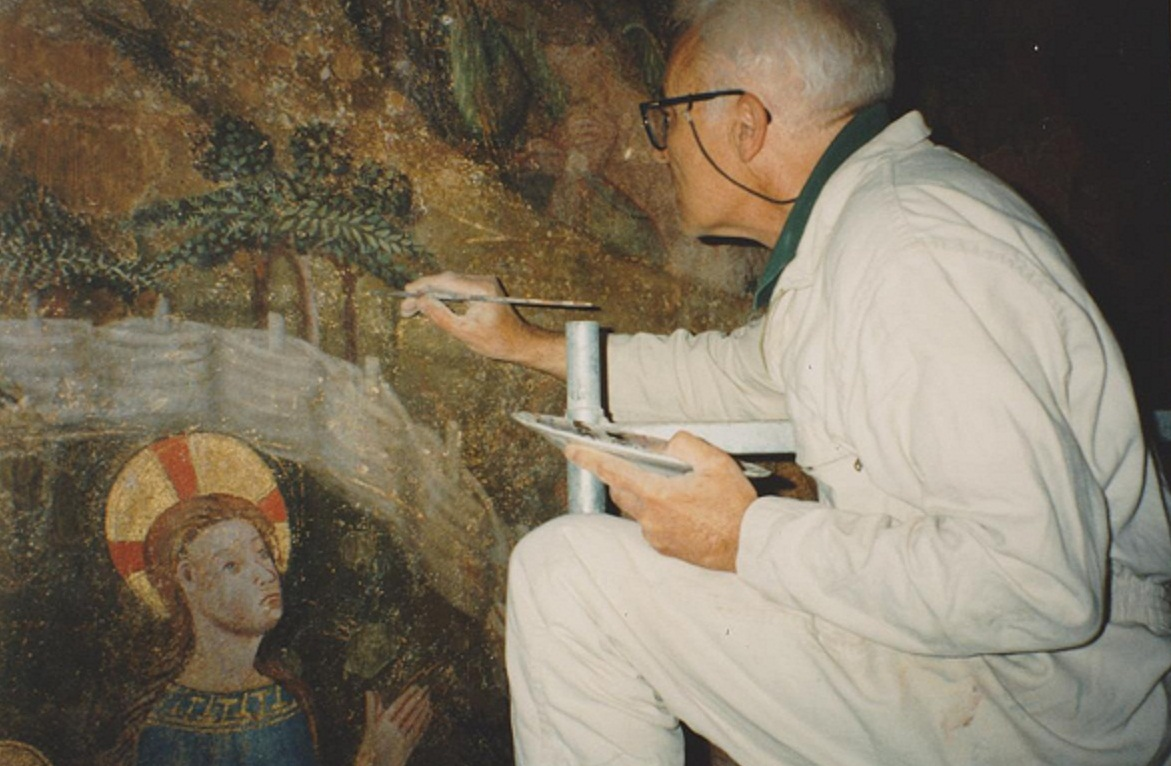
Yves Morvan in Saint-Flour in 1998

During more than 40 years he worked on the medieval art from Auvergne. His works are quoted by numerous experts in various books. He undertook an important work of archaeology and discovered numerous murals in the churches of the region. He realized more than three hundred archeological explorations and restorations of romanesque murals. In its novel " La chapelle des damnés " Samuel Gance named the main character Ivo Varmon which is Yves Morvan's anagram. In 2015, in a book on the colors harmony, he denounces The Michel-Eugène Chevreul's Laws of Contrast of Colour.

== Books ==
- Yves Morvan, Pascal à Mirefleurs ? Les dessins de la maison de Domat, Courrier du Centre International Blaise Pascal, 6, 1984.
- Yves Morvan, La peste noire à Jenzat, in Bulletin historique et scientifique de l'Auvergne, Clermont-Ferrand, vol. 92, n° 682, 1984.
- Yves Morvan, La maison de l'Éléphant, Bulletin historique et scientifique de l'Auvergne, vol. 92, n° 683, 1984.
- Yves Morvan, Ezio Arduini, Pascal à Mirefleurs ? Les dessins de la maison de Domat, Impr. Blandin, 1985.(FRBNF40378895)
- Yves Morvan, Montfermy : les peintures murales du sanctuaire, Bulletin historique et scientifique de l'Auvergne, vol. 93, n°689, 1986.
- Yves Morvan, Pascal d'après nature, Bulletin historique et scientifique de l'Auvergne, tome XCIII, n° 692-693, 1987.
- Yves Morvan, Récentes découvertes de peintures murales dans l'église Saint-Martin de Jenzat (Allier), Société Française d'Archéologie, Congrès archéologique de France, 146ème session, Bourbonnais, 1988.
- Yves Morvan, Bruno Saunier, Peintures murales du XIIe au XVIIIe (principaux sites), Association pour l'Étude et la Mise en Valeur du Patrimoine Auvergnat, 1989.
- Yves Morvan, Images anciennes et nouvelles de Blaise Pascal, souvenir de l’exposition, Courrier du Centre International Blaise Pascal, 13, 1991.
- Yves Morvan, Les peintures de la salle capitulaire d'Issoire, Revue d'Auvergne, Volume 106, Numéro 3. Société des amis de l'Université de Clermont. Ed. G. Mont-Louis, 1992.(ISSN 0035-1008)
- Yves Morvan, Des témoins ressuscités, Monuments historiques, n° 197, 1995.
- Yves Morvan, Une page de l'histoire des chemins de Saint-Jacques en Haute-Auvergne in Vivre en moyenne montagne: Éditions du CTHS, 1995 (ISBN 2735502937)
- Yves Morvan, Les peintures intérieures, Bulletin n°26 de l'association des amis du vieux Pont-du-Château, 1995.
- Yves Morvan, Et c'est ainsi qu'Anna est grande... Découverte de peintures murales dans l'église Saint-Vincent de Saint-Flour, Bulletin historique et scientifique de l'Auvergne, tome XCIX, 1998.
- Catherine Lonchambon, Yves Morvan, Des peintures murales inattendues et insolites: Merveilles de l'église de Pignols. Histoire et Images médiévales. n°47, 2003.
- Yves Morvan, La Sirène et la luxure; Communication du Colloque "La luxure et le corps dans l'art roman". Mozac. 2008.
- Hélène Leroy, Francis Debaisieux, Yves Morvan, Vierges romanes-Portraits croisés, Éditions Debaisieux, 2009.(ISBN 978-2-913-381-71-1).
- Yves Morvan, La vision et l'harmonie des couleurs (Nouveaux regards), Éditions Ex Aequo, 2015.(ISBN 978-2-359-627-26-8)
- Yves Morvan, Le Christ noir de Saint-Flour, Bulletin historique et scientifique de l’Auvergne, 2017.
- Yves Morvan, White paint and black color in the Middle Ages, International Colour Association (AIC) Conference 2020.

== Archeological works ==
- Frescoes of the romanesque church of Orléat.
- Murals of the Aigueperse church.
- Murals of the Cathedral Notre-Dame-de-l'Assomption of Clermont-Ferrand.
- Frescoes of the 14th century in the Romanesque church of Beurières.
- Saint-Léger church of Montfermy.
- Saint-Martin church of Jaleyrac.
- Murals of the XVIth in the Charraix church.
- Michael and a hunting scene on the south wall of the Ris church.
- Murals of the church of Pignols.
- Saint Vincent church of Saint-Flour.
- Saint Vincent Convent of Saint-Flour: scene with Saint James.
- Saint Bartholomew's church in Saint-Amant-Roche-Savine.
- Restoration and discovery of new blazons in the " Room of States " of the Château de Ravel.

== Exhibitions and works ==
- Dix ans de découvertes et de restauration, Pignols church. July–August 1992.
- Art Sacré, Sellier Gallery, Aurillac. November–December 2007.
- Images anciennes et nouvelles de Blaise Pascal. Espace municipal Pierre Laporte, Jaude Centre. Clermont-Ferrand. 1990.
- Painting of the "Ici sévit Mandrin" fresco on the Mandrin' door in Brioude.
- Copies of the romanesque virgins of Saint-Victor-la-Rivière, of Chassignolles, of the Forez, of Colamine-sous-Vodable, of Usson, among others.

== Example of an archaeological discovery and restoration of a mural painting in Saint-Amant-Roche-Savine ==
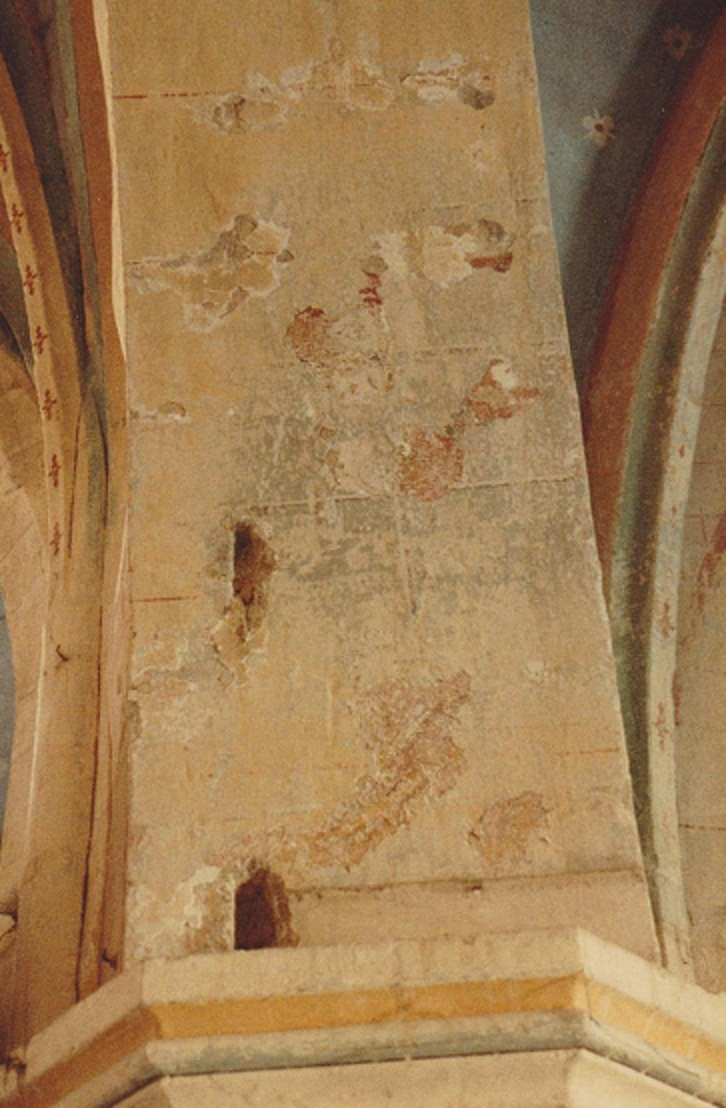
First archaeological search in the 19th century layer

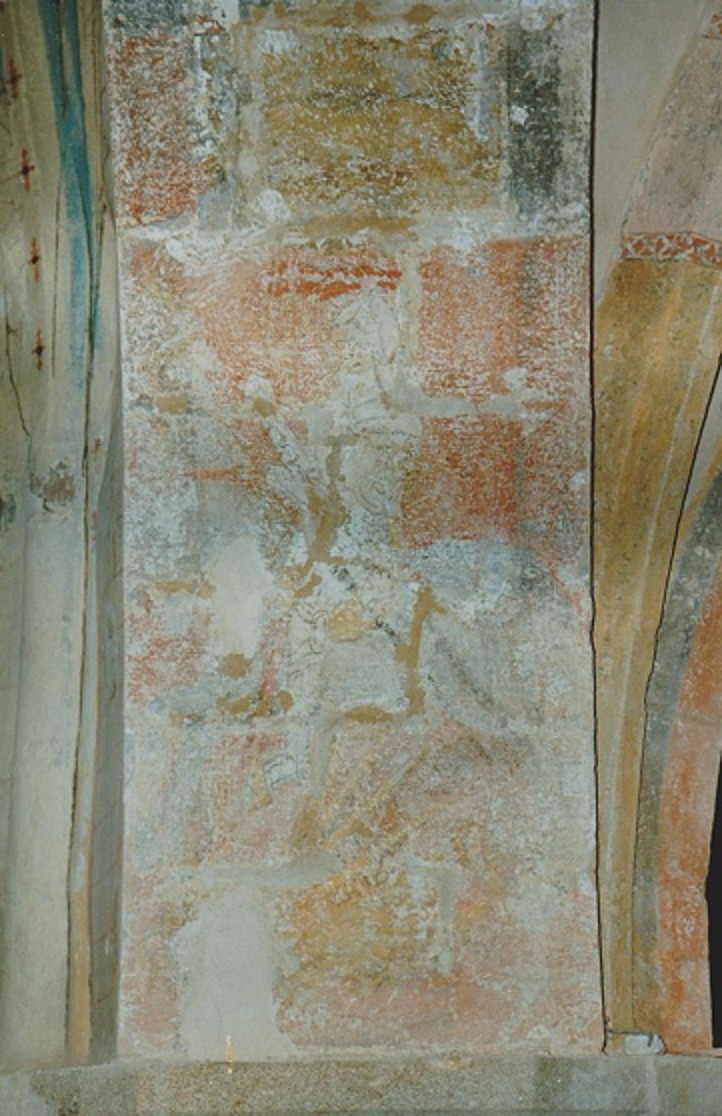
Painting of the 15th century cleared before restoration

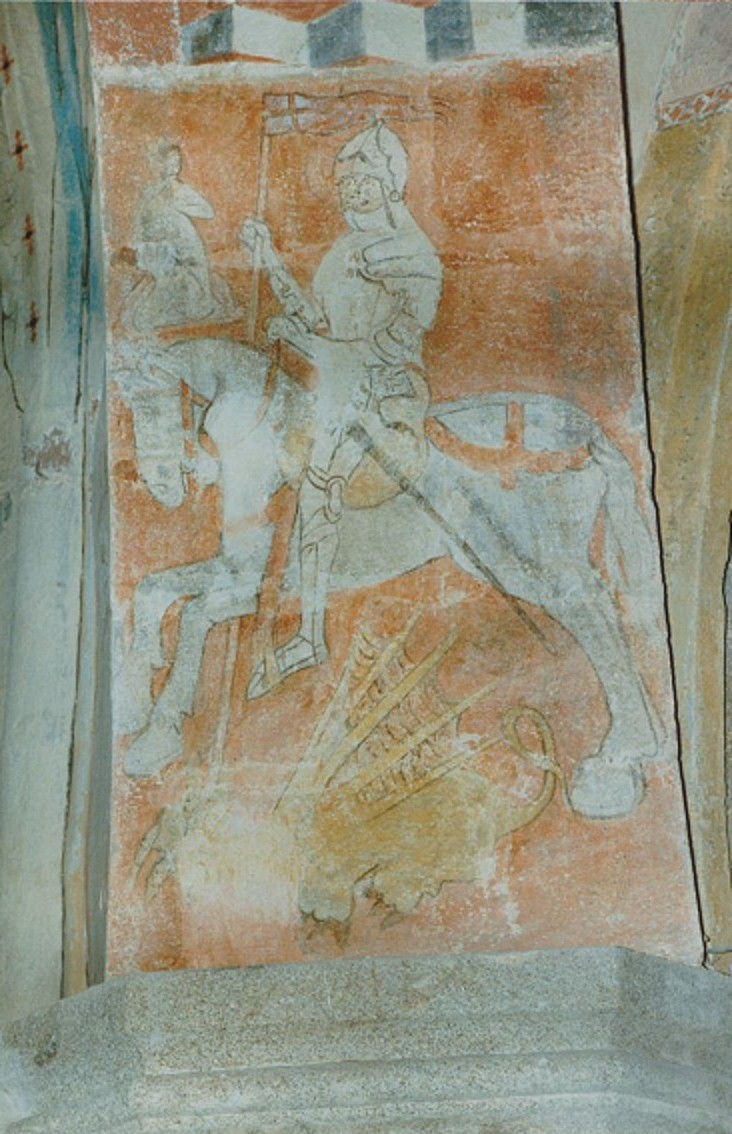
Painting after restoration
