= Adolph Bandelier =

American archaeologist (1840–1914)

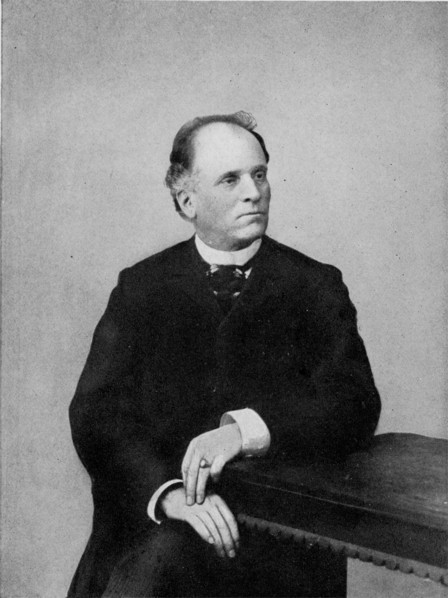
- Born: Adolph Francis Alphonse Bandelier; August 6, 1840; Bern, Switzerland
- Died: March 18, 1914 (aged 73); Sevilla, Spain
- Scientific career
- Fields: Archaeology

Adolph Francis Alphonse Bandelier (August 6, 1840 – March 18, 1914) was a Swiss and American archaeologist who particularly explored the indigenous cultures of the American Southwest, Mexico, and South America. He immigrated to the United States with his family as a youth and made his life there, abandoning the family business to study in the new fields of archeology and ethnology.

Bandelier National Monument in New Mexico was named for him, as his studies established the significance of this area in the Jemez Mountains for archeological and historic preservation of sites of Ancestral Puebloans dating to two eras from 1150 to 1600 CE.

== Life ==
Bandelier was born in Bern, Switzerland. As a youth, he emigrated to the United States with his family, which settled in Highland, Illinois, a community established by other Swiss immigrants. He labored unhappily in the family business as a young man. He became acquainted with the pioneering anthropologist Lewis Henry Morgan of New York, who served as a mentor as Bandelier turned to scholarship. In particular, he undertook archaeological and ethnological work among the Native Americans of the southwestern United States, Mexico, and South America.

Beginning his studies in Sonora (Mexico), Arizona, and New Mexico, Bandelier developed as the leading authority on the history of this region. With F. H. Cushing and his successors, he became one of the leading authorities on its prehistoric civilization, at a time when archeology and ethnology were new fields of study.

In 1892, Bandelier left the Southwest to travel and conduct research in Ecuador, Bolivia, and Peru, where he continued ethnological, archaeological, and historical investigations. In the first part of his fieldwork he was connected with the Hemenway Archaeological Expedition. In the second, he worked in NYC for Henry Villard and for the American Museum of Natural History. Bandelier had shown the falsity of various historical myths, notably in his conclusions respecting the Inca civilization of Peru.

While working at the Pueblo of Isleta (in New Mexico), Bandelier made some long-term friends. They included French-born missionary Father Anton Docher, who had served the Tiwa people since 1891 and was known as the Padre of Isleta. Another was American journalist and writer Charles Fletcher Lummis, who also wrote on ethnology. Lummis traveled with Bandelier for a time in South America, before returning to his base in Los Angeles.

== Legacy and honors ==
- Bandelier National Monument in New Mexico was named for him, as his studies established the significance of this area for understanding ancient indigenous cultures of the Tuyongi canyon.
- Bandelier Elementary School in Albuquerque, New Mexico was named after him.
- Bandelier was elected a member of the American Antiquarian Society in 1881.

== Publications ==
- Harvard University, Peabody Museum of American Archaeology and Ethnology, Annual Reports, 1877, 1878, 1879:
  - On the Art of War and Mode of Warfare of the Ancient Mexicans
  - On the Distribution and Tenure of Lands and the Customs with respect to Inheritance among the Ancient Mexicans
  - On the Social Organization and Mode of Government of the Ancient Mexicans
- From the Papers of the Archaeological Institute of America, American Series, constituting vols. i.-v.:
  - Historical Introduction to Studies among the Sedentary Indians of New Mexico, and Report on the Ruins of the Pueblo of Pecos (1881)
  - Report of an Archaeological Tour in Mexico in 1881 (1884)
  - Final Report of Investigations among the Indians of the South-Western United States (1890–1892, 2 vols.)
  - Contributions to the History of the South-western Portion of the United States carried on mainly in the years from 1880 to 1885 (1890)
- "The Romantic School of American Archaeologists" (New York Historical Society, 1885)
- The Gilded Man (El Dorado) and other Pictures of the Spanish Occupancy of America (1893)
- On the Relative Antiquity of Ancient Peruvian Burials (American Museum of Natural History, Bulletin, v. 30, 1904)
- Aboriginal Myths and Traditions concerning the Island of Titicaca, Bolivia. (1904)
- The Journey of Alvar Nuñez Cabeza de Vaca ... from Florida to the Pacific, 1528-1536 (editor, translated into English by his wife; 1905).
- The Islands of Titicaca and Koati(1910)
- The Delight Makers (1890), a novel of Pueblo Indian life - scanned text in full at Internet Archive
