= Marloth Park =

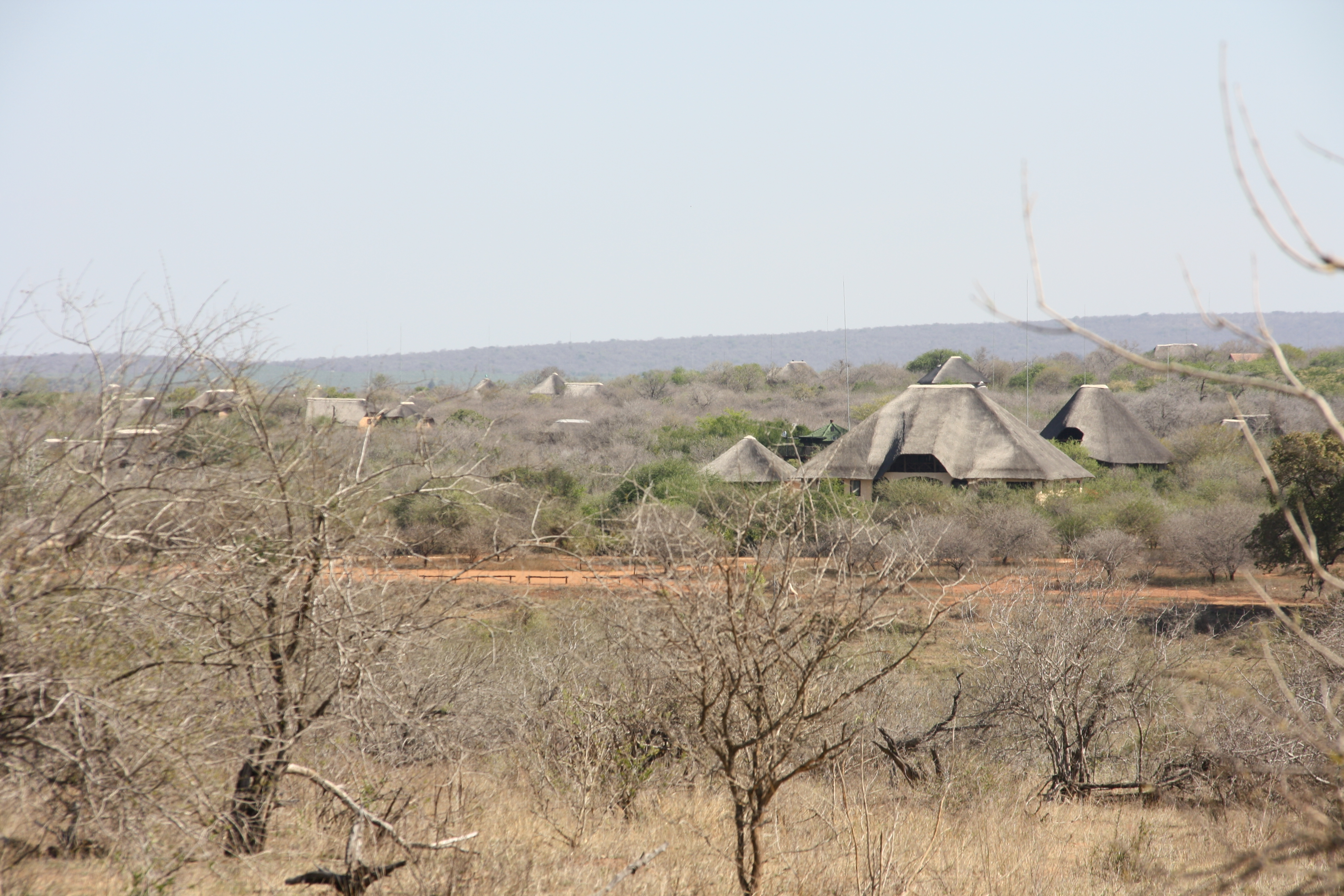
- Marloth Park seen from the Kruger Park

- Location within Mpumalanga Location within South Africa
- Coordinates: 25°20′36″S 31°46′58″E
- Country: South Africa
- Province: Mpumalanga
- District: Ehlanzeni
- Municipality: Nkomazi
- Established: 1977

Area
  - Total: 30 km^{2} (12 sq mi)

Population (2011)
  - Total: 1,000
  - Density: 33/km^{2} (86/sq mi)

Racial makeup (2011)
  - Black African: 30.8%
  - Coloured: 0.5%
  - Indian/Asian: 0.8%
  - White: 67.4%
  - Other: 0.5%

First languages (2011)
  - Afrikaans: 48.1%
  - Swazi: 22.8%
  - English: 21.3%
  - Tsonga: 2.9%
  - Other: 4.9%
- Time zone: UTC+2 (SAST)

Marloth Park is a wildlife sanctuary and holiday town situated in northeastern South Africa in the lowveld region of Mpumalanga province (formerly Eastern Transvaal), between the towns of Malelane and Komatipoort. It occupies an area of some 3000 hectares and shares a boundary with the Kruger National Park.

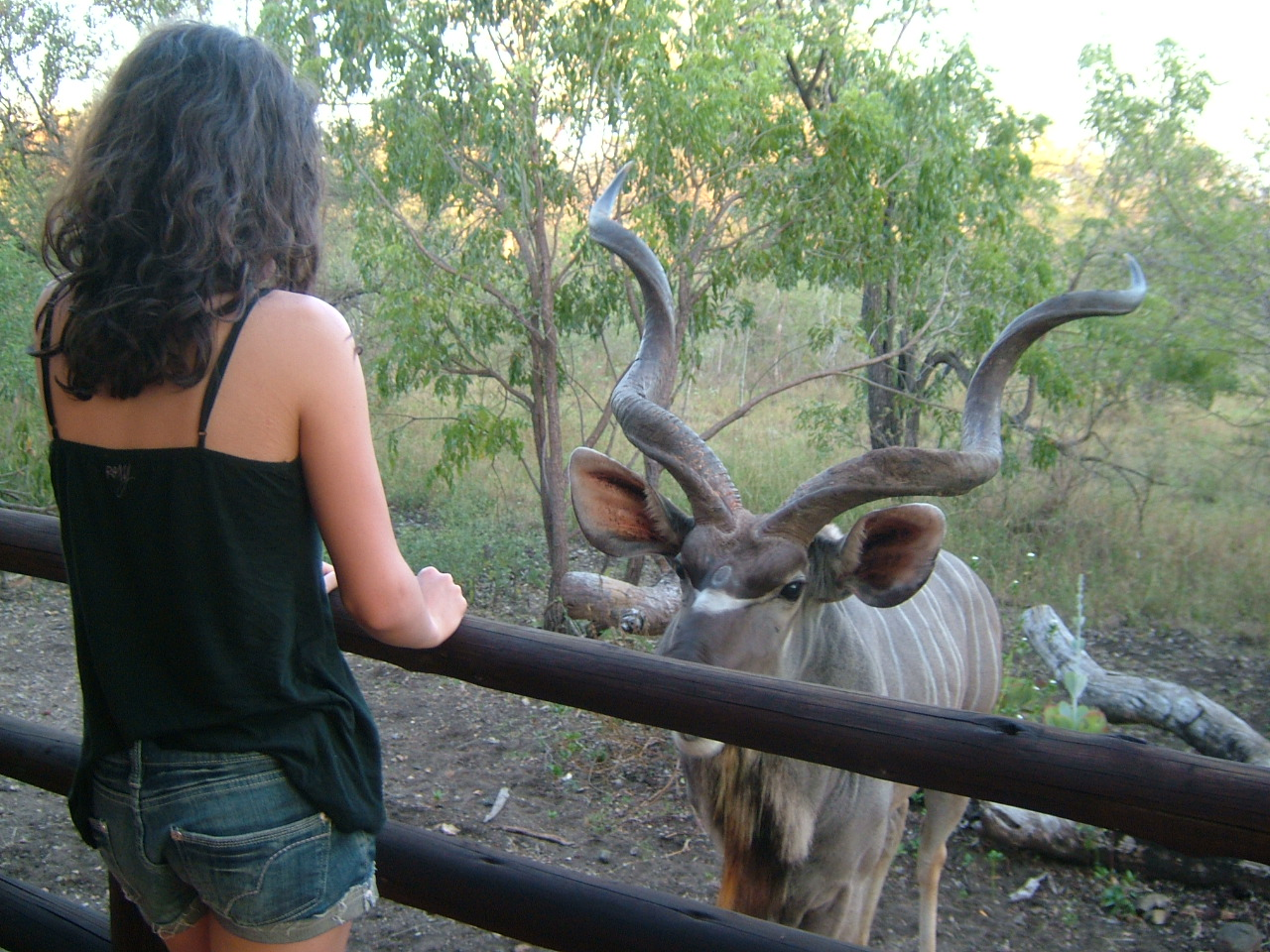
Kudu in Marloth Park

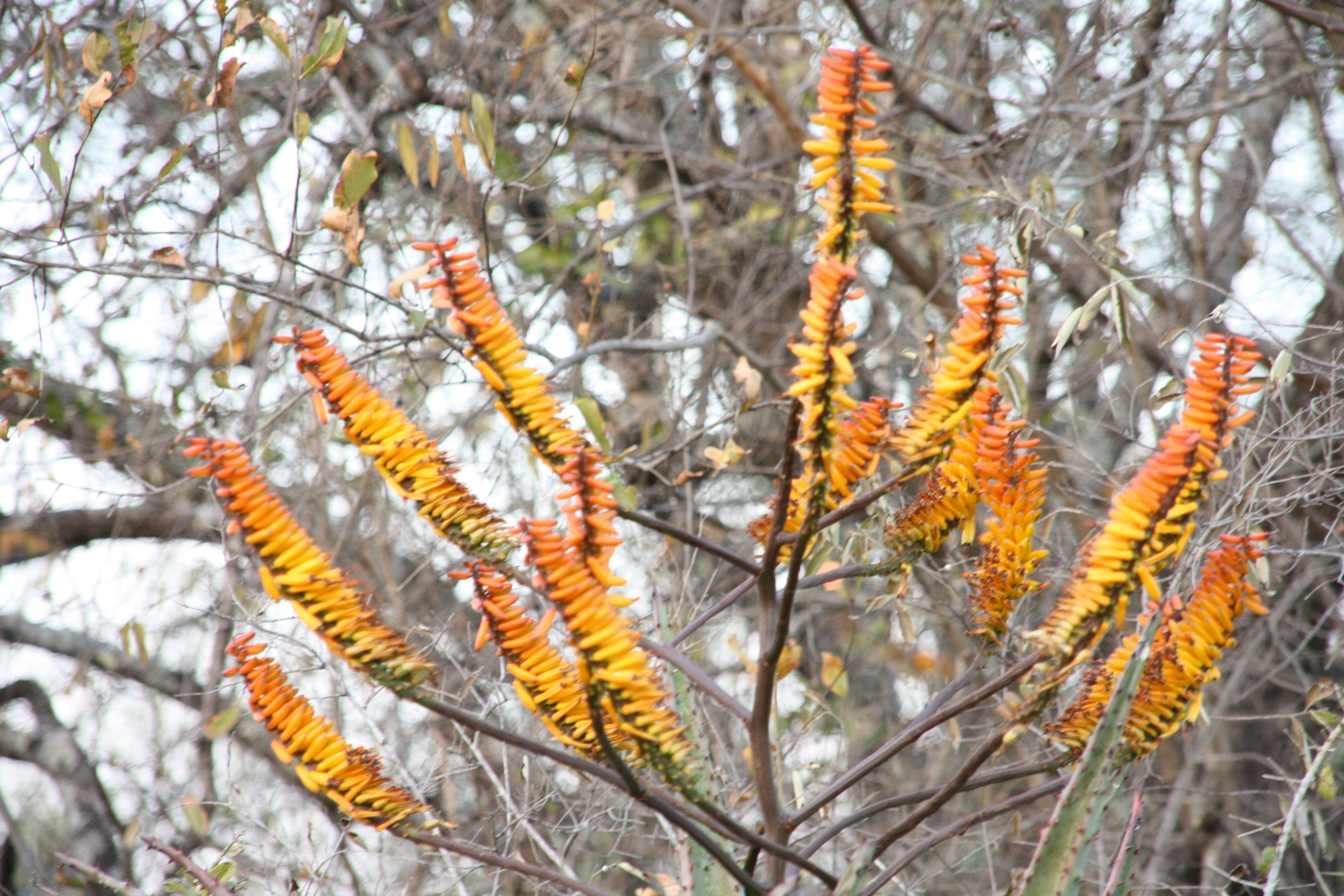
Inflorescence of Aloe marlothii, from which the park's name is taken

== Geography ==
It is located along the south bank of the Crocodile River, which also forms the southern boundary of the Kruger National Park, while its Lionspruit section of 1500 ha borders the N4 national freeway to the south. The Kruger Park's Malelane and Crocodile Bridge entry gates are respectively 35 km and 14 km to the west and east.

Marloth Park boasts four of the “Big Five”, the exception being the bush elephant. Buffalo, rhino and lion are confined to Marloth's game reserve, Lionspruit; Visitors have access to Lionspruit in their private vehicles, though some tracks may require a 4x4. Picnic and braai areas, besides viewpoints and water places are found here.

The remaining game species such as kudu, zebra, giraffe, blue wildebeest, nyala, impala, bushbuck, warthog, baboon, vervet monkey, ostrich and others aren't restricted by fences and roam freely between the units that occupy the northern section. In addition other small game and a varied bird life is present. Sometimes, lions from Kruger Park roam into Marloth Park.

== History ==
It opened in 1972 as a holiday township, before Marloth Park was founded in 1977. It is named after German-born South African botanist, Rudolf Marloth, after whom the native Aloe marlothii is named. This plant is found abundantly in the middle and lowveld.

== Tourism ==
Marloth Park is a stopover point for tourists travelling to the Kruger National Park, to Mozambique or to Eswatini. Many lodges and private houses are found inside the Park. The holiday town is a unique project, in that a large part of the park was left natural. Besides the boundary with Lionspruit, there are no internal fences and the vegetation remains in an original state. Marloth Park is separated by a boundary fence and by the Crocodile River from Kruger Park. Meanwhile, the infrastructure of the natural park is well developed.

Inside Marloth Park movement is not confined to the housing units. Freedom of movement allows tourists to ride a bicycle or go for a walk on their own through the bush. While walking along the Crocodile River, wildlife scenes of the adjacent Kruger National Park also come into view. Local restaurants, shops and a filling station are easily accessible.

== Climate ==
Marloth Park features a humid subtropical climate with mild winters and hot summers.

== Notable residents ==
- Philippe Morvan, French writer.
- Pieter Pieterse, South African writer.
