= Juan de Salas (friar) =

Spanish priest and explorer

- Born: c. 1580
- Died: c. 1650 (aged c. 70)
- Occupation: Missionary
- Known for: Founder of San Agustín de la Isleta Mission

Fray Juan de Salas (c. 1580 - c. 1645) was a Spanish Franciscan friar who provided religious instruction to the people of New Mexico and what is now Texas in the first half of the seventeenth century.

== Isleta ==
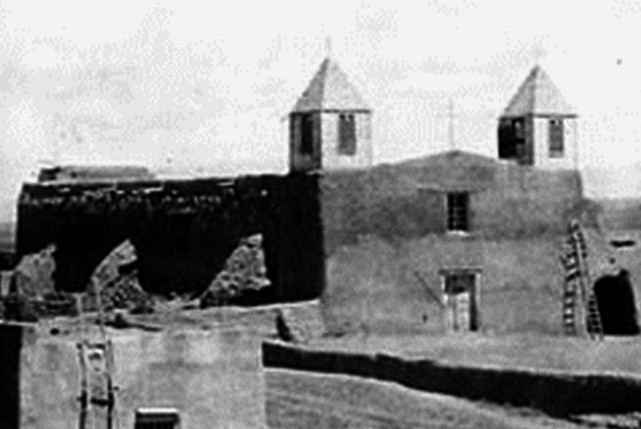
Isleta mission in 1880

In 1612, Juan de Salas came to New Mexico with Ordoñez. He became a missionary at the San Agustín de la Isleta Mission in Isleta Pueblo, New Mexico, just south of the modern city of Albuquerque, New Mexico. Fray Salas erected the "convent" of Isleta, in late 1612, early 1613.

In 1629, the mission was visited by Jumanos from a region further south and east of what is now Albuquerque. The visiting natives reported that they had been visited by a "Woman in Blue", and she had told them to ask for religious instruction. Some say the Jumanos were mainly interested in gaining protection from Apaches. At that time, the nun María de Ágreda was living in a convent in Ágreda, in Spain, and was known for falling into ecstatic trances. Between 1620 and 1623, she often said she was "transported by the aid of the angels" to settlements of people called Jumanos, and these reported visits continued in subsequent years, although less often. In 1629, the friars at Isleta received an inquiry from Spain about whether the natives had reported visitations by a nun, and they immediately identified the "Woman in Blue" with María de Agreda.

== Jumanos missions ==
Salas and Fray Diego León visited the Jumanos country in July 1629, about 300 miles (480 km) to the ESE of Isleta, working with them for several months. When de Salas and López reached the Jumanos they found that they already had a good understanding of Christian teachings, which they put down to the work of the Lady in Blue. They therefore baptized all the ten thousand members of the tribe without further instruction. They also healed many sick people through the power of their religion. While there, they received requests for teaching from tribes further to the east. In 1632 Salas, Father Juan de Ortega and a small party of soldiers traveled to Jumano country near to what is now San Angelo, Texas. They named the river on which the Jumanas lived the Rio de Nueces because of the nuts that grew beside it. Salas returned to Santa Fe, and Ortega followed him after six months.

== Later events ==
Fray Salas was recorded as priest at Cuaray in 1643.

Later, the route into Texas taken by Juan de Salas was to be followed by the Castillo-Martin expedition of 1650 and the Diego de Guadalajara expedition of 1654. The Spanish took an increasing interest in the region. They built missions, and eventually built the town of San Angelo, Texas near the site of Salas's mission.
