= Anton Docher =

American pioneer priest (1852–1928)

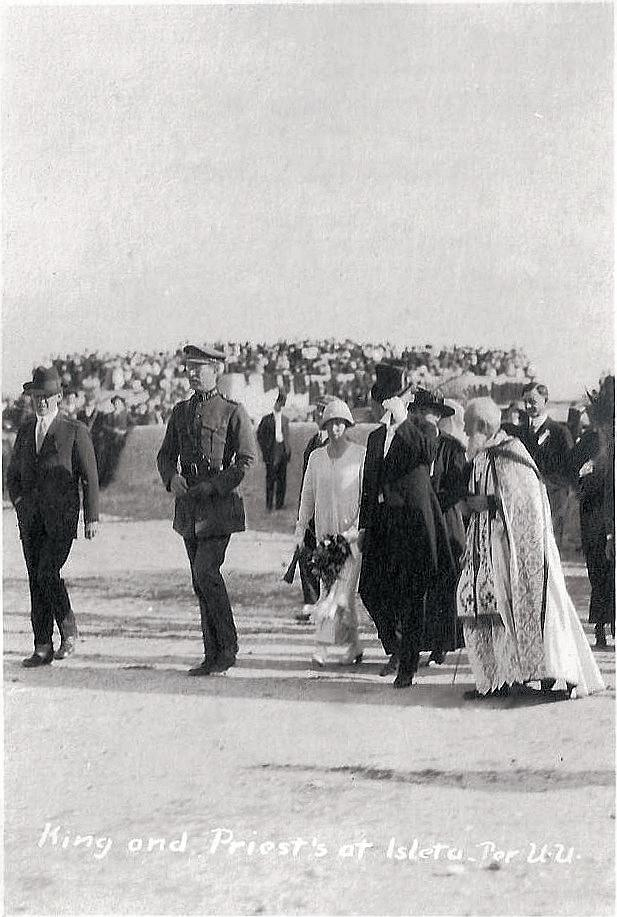
- King Albert I of Belgium and the Queen during their visit in Isleta pueblo 1919 with State Governor and Anton Docher in the foreground.
- Born: 1852; Le Crest, Puy-de-Dôme, France
- Died: 18 December 1928 (aged 75–76); Isleta Pueblo, New Mexico, US

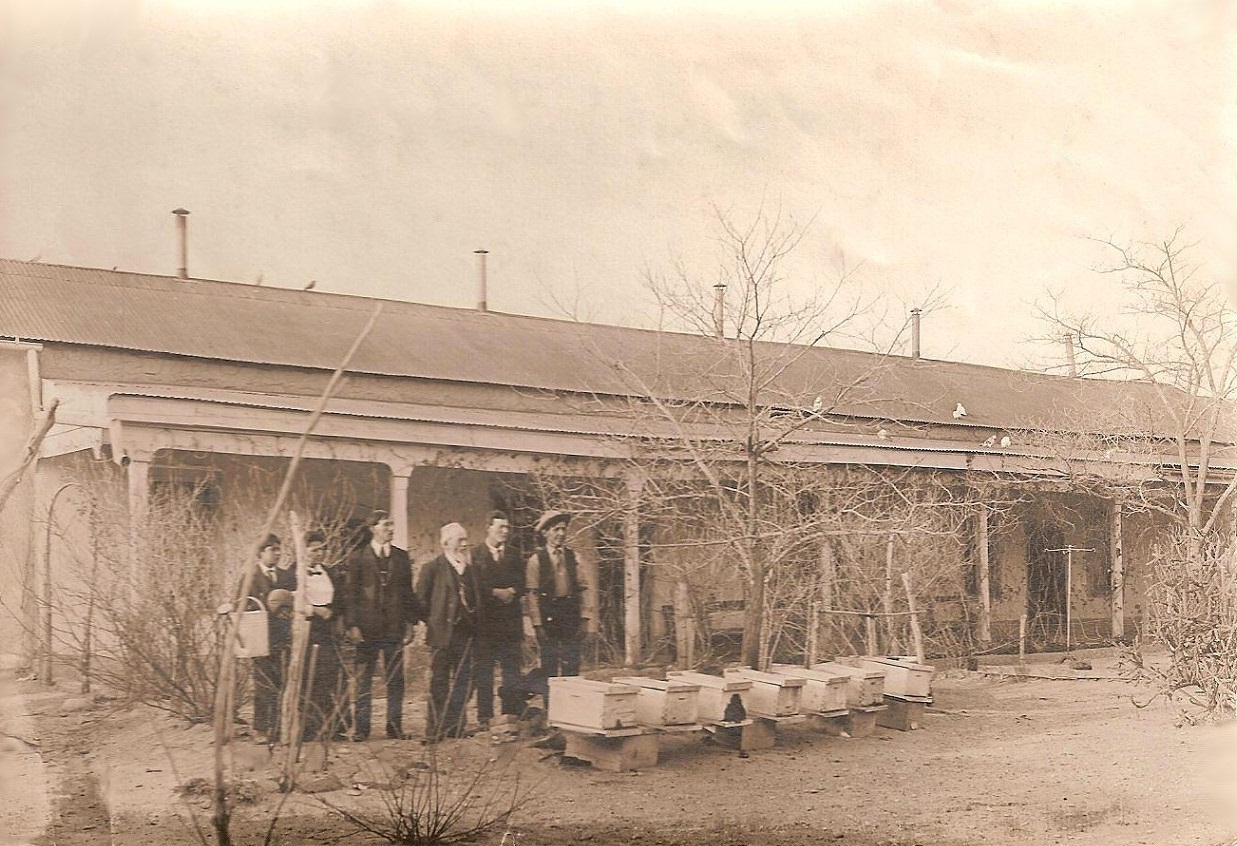
Anton Docher in front of his house in Isleta with Tomas Chavez and beehives

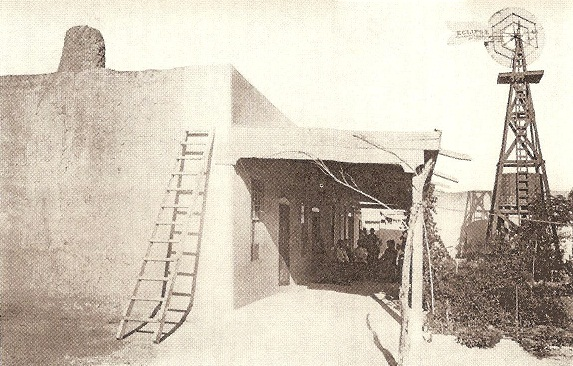
Anton Docher Isletan house

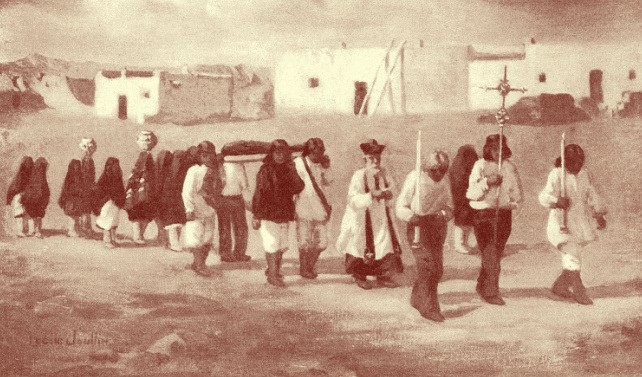
Painting of a funeral procession in Isleta in the 1900s featuring Father Anton Docher, by Lucille Joullin

Anton Docher (1852–1928), born Antonin Jean Baptiste Docher (pronounced ɑ̃tɔnɛ̃ ʒɑ̃ batist dɔʃe), was a French Franciscan Roman Catholic priest, who served as a missionary to Native Americans in New Mexico, in the Southwest of the United States. He served 34 years with the Pueblo of Isleta and was known for defending the Indians.

After academic studies and years of military service, Docher traveled to the United States in 1887, where he was first assigned to the Cathedral of Santa Fe for a few years and was ordained. He worked briefly at Taos before he was assigned to the Pueblo of Isleta in New Mexico, where he served for 34 years until his death. In the United States, his first name became Americanized as Anton, but he is also referred to as Antonin, Antonio, Anthony, Antoine, Antonine or Antonino.

== Biography ==
Anton Docher was born in 1852 in Le Crest, a small wine-growing village of Puy de Dôme in Auvergne, France, son of Elizabeth Garce and Antoine Docher. He had three brothers, and their father died when they were young. Together with his brothers and widowed mother, during his youth Docher worked in the vineyards of the area. At the age of 18, he became a student at the "Petit" Seminary of Saint Sauveur in Puy de Dôme, studying there for eight years to prepare for life as a priest.

At the age of 27, during his first year studying philosophy in the "Grand" Seminary of Clermont-Ferrand, Docher was conscripted for military service. He served in North Africa, in Tunisia. Next he served in Cochinchina (now Vietnam) where he fought for five years in the colonial army, achieving the rank of sergeant. Docher was wounded and decorated with the Colonial Medal for bravery, but his experiences led him to conclude that colonialism was immoral. He had contracted lung disease whilst in North Africa, and returned to France after being in Indochina. He resumed his studies at the "Petit" Seminary as a Prefect.

Long interested in working as a missionary, on 21 October 1887, Docher left France for New Mexico. After two years of additional studies, including local Native American languages, he was ordained as a priest in the Cathedral of Santa Fe by J.B. Salpointe. He served two years in Bernalillo and in Taos.

In 1891 Docher was transferred to the Pueblo of Isleta, arriving on 28 December of that year. A community of Tiwa Indians, the pueblo is situated on the west bank of the Rio Grande, south of Albuquerque. During Docher's decades in Isleta, he also served as a priest in Laguna, Acoma, Los Lunas, and Peralta.

In Los Lentes, in 1893 Docher acquired a massive ancient bell for the chapel, which he had installed in a prominent central belfry.

Known as "The Padre of Isleta", Docher spent 34 years with the Tiwa people. He was a very close friend of Adolph Bandelier, an anthropologist; Charles Fletcher Lummis and Pablo Abeita, who became governor of the pueblo.

Like anthropologist Bandelier, Docher collected Indian objects during this period (kachinas, pottery, basketry and weapons). Some of his collection has been preserved by the Docher and Morvan families. Respected by the Isleta for his open-minded attitude to their customs and ancestral faiths Docher was called Tashide, which means "little helper" in Tewa language. He was known for owning a parrot named Tina, which used very foul language. At Isleta, Docher created a beautiful and luxuriant garden.

During his long residence in Isleta, Docher met several prominent figures who visited the Pueblo. People were fascinated by the American Southwest. Prominent visitors included the royal family of Belgium, who gave him the Order of Leopold; American author Willa Cather, and George Wharton James, among others.

Father Docher raised an Isletan orphan boy named Tomas Chavez. When the adult Chavez married Lolita Delores, Father Docher gave the couple five acres and a house in Los Lunas as a wedding gift. Chavez developed a vineyard on this land and supplied wine to the Isleta and local churches. Chavez died in 1925, three years before the Father. His widow Lolita Delores was left with nine children. Father Docher paid for two girls, Stella and Margaret, to attend the Sisters of Loretto Orphanage school.

Docher became a naturalized United States citizen. Close to the people he served, Docher referred to himself as an "Indian" in the letters which he sent to his family in France.

In September 1912, Fr. Docher presided over the funeral mass of Solomon Luna, a powerful businessman and politician of New Mexico. He had died mysteriously at his ranch on 30 August 1912. The mass took place at the Immaculate Conception church of Albuquerque, because the parish church Los Lunas was far too small to accommodate the large crowd expected, given his prominence.

In 1923, Father Anton Docher undertook a major remodeling of the San Agustín de la Isleta Mission (previously named San Antonio de Isleta), constructing prominent French gothic spires surmounting the adobe walls. He also constructed a sloping roof in order to avoid the water leaks which repeatedly had damaged the altar. Designated as part of the Pueblo Isleta Historic District, in the late 20th century, the mission church was restored to a more accurate, historical design. This historic district is listed on the National Register of Historic Places.

== Last years ==
Suffering a long illness, Father Docher lived the last three years of his life as a patient at the St. Joseph Hospital in Albuquerque, where he died at the age of 76 on 18 December 1928. Albert Daeger, archbishop of Santa Fe, presided over the mass of funeral in the church of Isleta. Father Docher was buried in the church by the side of previous missionary Father Juan de Padilla.

== Representation in other media ==
- Willa Cather used Docher as a model for her protagonist Padre Jesus de Baca in her novel Death Comes for the Archbishop (1927). Cather met Father Docher during a visit in Isleta near the end of his life.
- Docher was portrayed in a historical novel by Samuel Gance, Anton ou la trajectoire d'un père (2013); the author conducted considerable research on his subject. The book fictionally portrays Docher's childhood in Auvergne, his military period in Tunisia and in Indochina, his ordination and service in New Mexico. It explores his friendships with Charles Lummis, Adolph Bandelier, and Pablo Abeita.
- His life was also explored in the biography, The Padre of Isleta (1940/reissued 2009) by Julia Keleher and Elsie Ruth Chant.
- Docher was included among 231 notable pioneers of the American West by Mary Ellen Snodgrass.
- In 2018 French writer Philippe Morvan was inspired by his adventure life to write his novel Ours published by Calmann-Levy.

== History and legends ==
The life of Docher was tied into the legends of Isleta. An earlier missionary, Padre Juan de Padilla, who was buried in the village church, was said to leave his grave and roam the village in the evenings. One day (25 April 1895), Antonin Docher decided to investigate this ghost's appearance in the presence of other witnesses and opened the grave of Padre Padilla. During this event, Anton Docher injured his arm, developing gangrene. Doctors recommended amputation of his lower arm, but the Tiwa evoked the intercession of Padre Padilla. Antonin Docher also prayed to Padre Padilla for a cure, and the wound disappeared.

== Bibliography ==
Novels and biographies

- Samuel Gance, Anton ou la trajectoire d'un père, L'histoire romancée du père Anton Docher. L'Harmattan, Paris, 2013, 208 p. ISBN 978-2336290164
- Keleher, Julia M.; Chant, Elsie Ruth (2009). The Padre of Isleta: The Story of Father Anton Docher. Sunstone press Publishing. ISBN 978-0-86534-714-4.

References

- Salpointe, Jean-Baptiste (2010). The Indians of Arizona and New Mexico: Nineteenth Century Ethnographic Notes.
- Tradición Revista, Volumes 10 à 12, LPD Enterprises, 2005.
- El Palacio, Volumes 54 à 56, Museum of New Mexico, 1947.
- The New Mexico Quarterly, Volume 11, Thomas Matthews Pearce, University of New Mexico, 1941.
- Bleiler, Lyn; Strong, Charles (2012). Santa Fe Art and Architecture. Arcadia Publishing. ISBN 978-0-7385-9598-6.
- Boylan, Leona Davis (1974). Spanish colonial silver. Museum of New Mexico Press. ISBN 978-0-89013-066-7.
- Bullock, Alice (1985). Living legends of the Santa Fe country. Sunstone Press. ISBN 0-913270-06-7.
- Burr, Baldwin G. (2012). Los Lunas. Arcadia Publishing. p. 106. ISBN 978-0-7385-9534-4.
- Cather, Willa (1927). Death comes for the archbishop. Alfred A. Knopf. ISBN 978-1-4179-0423-5.
- Crane, Leo (2007). Desert Drums – The Pueblo Indians of New Mexico 1540–1928. Crane Press. ISBN 978-1-4067-6246-4.
- De Aragon, Ray John (2006). Padre Martínez and Bishop Lamy. Sunstone Press. ISBN 978-1-60949-760-6.
- De Aragon, Ray John (2012). Hidden History of Spanish New Mexico. The History Press. ISBN 978-0-86534-506-5.
- de Benavides, Alonso; Frederick Webb Hodge; Charles Fletcher Lummis (1965). The memorial of Fray Alonso de Benavides, 1630. Horn and Wallace.
- De Huff, Elizabeth Willis (1945). Say the bells of old missions: legends of old New Mexico churches. B. Herder book co.
- Dendinger, Julia M. (23 April 2011). "Fr. Docher of Isleta pueblo". The News-Bulletin.
- Docher, Anton (1913). "The Quaint Indian Pueblo of Isleta". Santa Fe Magazine. 7 (7): 29–32.
- Guggino, Patty. "Los Lentes". New Mexico State Record Center and Archives. Archived from the original on 6 October 2010.
- Hollenback, Amelia; Straw Cook, Mary Jean. Immortal summer. Museum of New Mexico Press, 2002.
- The Indian Sentinel. (1913) – (vol. 1-1918) – (vol. 2-1920) – (vol. 9–1928–29).
- The Guardian, Little Rock, Arkansas, 12 Jan 1929. pp. 1–4.
- James, George Wharton (1911). A little journey to some strange places and peoples in our southwestern land. A. Flanagan company. ISBN 978-1-146-26809-7.
- Kessell, John L. (1980). The missions of New Mexico since 1776. University of New Mexico Press. ISBN 978-0-8263-0514-5.
- Lummis, Charles Fletcher (1900). Out West: A Magazine of the Old Pacific and the New, Volume 13. F. A. Pattee & Company. p. 438.
- Gordon, Dudley (1972). Charles F. Lummis: crusader in corduroy. Cultural Assets Press. p. 290.
- Lange, Charles H.; Riley, Carroll L.; Lange, Elizabeth M. (1966). The Southwestern Journals of Adolph F. Bandelier: 1889–1892. University of New Mexico Press. ISBN 0-8263-0734-5.
- Major, Mabel; Pearce, Thomas M. (1972). Southwest heritage. Univ. of New Mexico Press. ISBN 978-0-8263-0223-6.
- March, John; Arnold, Marilyn; Debra Lynn Thornton (1993). A Reader's Companion to the Fiction of Willa Cather. Greenwood Press. ISBN 978-0-313-28767-1.
- Markovich, Nicholas C.; Wolfgang F. E. Preiser; Fred Gillette Sturm (1990). Pueblo style and regional architecture. Van Nostrand Reinhold. ISBN 978-0-442-31896-3.
- Melzer, R. (2008). "Journalist finds danger, love in Isleta". The News-Bulletin.
- Montoya, Joe L. (1978). Isleta Pueblo and the Church of St. Augustine. St. Augustine Parish.
- "New Mexico Historical Review". 32. University of New Mexico: 2–26.
- Paulist Fathers (1943). Catholic world.vol. 157. Paulist Fathers.
- François-Marie Patorni, The French in New Mexico, French in America Press, 2020.
- Powell, Lawrence Clark (1974). Southwest classics: the creative literature of the arid lands: essays on the books and their writers. W. Ritchie Press. ISBN 978-0-8165-0795-5.
- Salpointe, Jean Baptiste (1898). Soldiers of the cross: Notes on the ecclesiastical history of New Mexico, Arizona, and Colorado. St. Boniface's Industrial School.
- Secord, Paul R. (2012). Albuquerque Deco and Pueblo. Arcadia Publishing. ISBN 978-0-7385-9526-9.
- Sheehan, Michael Jarboe (1998). Four hundred years of faith: seeds of struggle, harvest of faith : a history of the Catholic Church in New Mexico. Archdiocese of Santa Fe.
- Snodgrass, Mary Ellen (2015). Settlers of the American West: The Lives of 231 Notable Pioneers. McFarland & Company. pp. 47–49. ISBN 978-0-7864-9735-5.
- Steele, Thomas J.; Paul Fisher Rhetts, Barbe Awalt (1993). Seeds of struggle/harvest of faith: the papers of the Archdiocese of Santa Fe Catholic Cuarto Centennial Conference : The History of the Catholic Church in New Mexico. LPD Press. ISBN 978-1-890689-00-1.
- Treib, Marc (1993). Sanctuaries of Spanish New Mexico. Berkeley: University of California Press. ISBN 978-0-520-06420-1.
- Taylor, John; Melzer, Richard (2011). Catholics Along the Rio Grande. Arcadia publishing. ISBN 978-0-7385-7975-7.
- Twitchell, Ralph Emerson (1912). The Leading Facts of New Mexican History, Volume 2. Torch Press.
- United States Catholic Historical Society, U.S. Catholic Historian, Volume 16. 1998.
- University of New Mexico (1934). The New Mexico quarterly, Numéro 4. University of New Mexico.
- Vecsey, Christopher. On the Padre's Trail. University of Notre Dame Press, 1996. ISBN 0268037027.
- Vecsey, Christopher. Pueblo Indian Catholicism: The Isleta Case.U.S. Catholic Historian. Vol. 16, No. 2, Native-American Catholics (Spring, 1998), pp. 1–19. Published by: Catholic University of America Press.
- Wenger, Tisa Joy (2009). We have a religion: the 1920s Pueblo Indian dance controversy and American religious freedom. University of North Carolina Press. ISBN 978-0-8078-3262-2.
- Eleuterio Baca, Benjamin Maurice Read (1912). Illustrated history of New Mexico. New Mexican Print.
- Melzer, Richard (2013). Murder, Mystery & Mayheim in the Rio Abajo. Rio Grande Books. ISBN 978-1-936744-14-5.
- Caras y caretas, Volume 31, Numéros 1527 à 1534. Fray Mocho, 1928, p. 4.
