= Juan de Padilla =

Spanish priest (1490–1542)

The Rev. Juan de Padilla OFM
- Born: c. 1490; Toledo, Spain
- Died: 1542 (aged 51–52); Kansas, Current U.S.

Juan de Padilla, OFM (1490–1542) was a Spanish Catholic priest and missionary who spent much of his life exploring North America with Francisco Vásquez de Coronado. He was killed in what would become Kansas by Native Americans in 1542. He is seen as the first Christian martyr in the USA.

== Biography ==
Padilla worked as a soldier, then left the army and joined the Franciscan order; he traveled to Mexico in 1528.

Several Franciscans, together with more than 300 Spanish soldiers and workers, left Spain on 23 February 1540 to accompany Coronado on his quest for the Seven Cities of Gold, a mythical land of great wealth. When Coronado abandoned his search, Padilla and others followed him to explore what is now the Southwestern United States. Padilla was one of the first Europeans to see the Grand Canyon.

When Coronado was told by a native named the "Turk" that a great land called Quivira was in modern-day Kansas, Coronado's entire party immediately left in search of it. After reaching the location in 1541, the Spaniards camped alongside a Wichita village for 25 days. Finding no gold, and advised by other natives they were being led astray, they executed the Turk. Coronado returned to the Southwest and Padilla followed. One year later, the missionary priest returned to Kansas to preach to the Wichita, with fellow missionaries Luis de Escalona and Juan de la Cruz.

=== Death ===
He was killed near what is now Herington, Kansas, in 1542. He is considered to be one of the first Christian martyrs in the United States.

== Legends ==
Juan de Padilla is associated with a miracle known as the "Rising of the coffin of Padre Padilla". The story of seeing his coffin rise above the ground was repeated for many years, and was believed by many people in Isleta, where the Padre is believed to be buried. Additionally, his corpse was claimed to have been fresh when rising the first time according to the legend (incorruptibility).

Anton Docher, once a priest in Isleta, investigated the miracle in the presence of several witnesses. He opened the grave of Padre Padilla. During this operation, Docher injured his arm and suffered from the then highly dangerous gangrene. Doctors recommended amputation for his survival. The native inhabitants invoked the intercession of Padre Padilla. Docher made a prayer to Padre Padilla to cure and forgive him for what he did, and supposedly, the wound had disappeared.

== Memorial ==
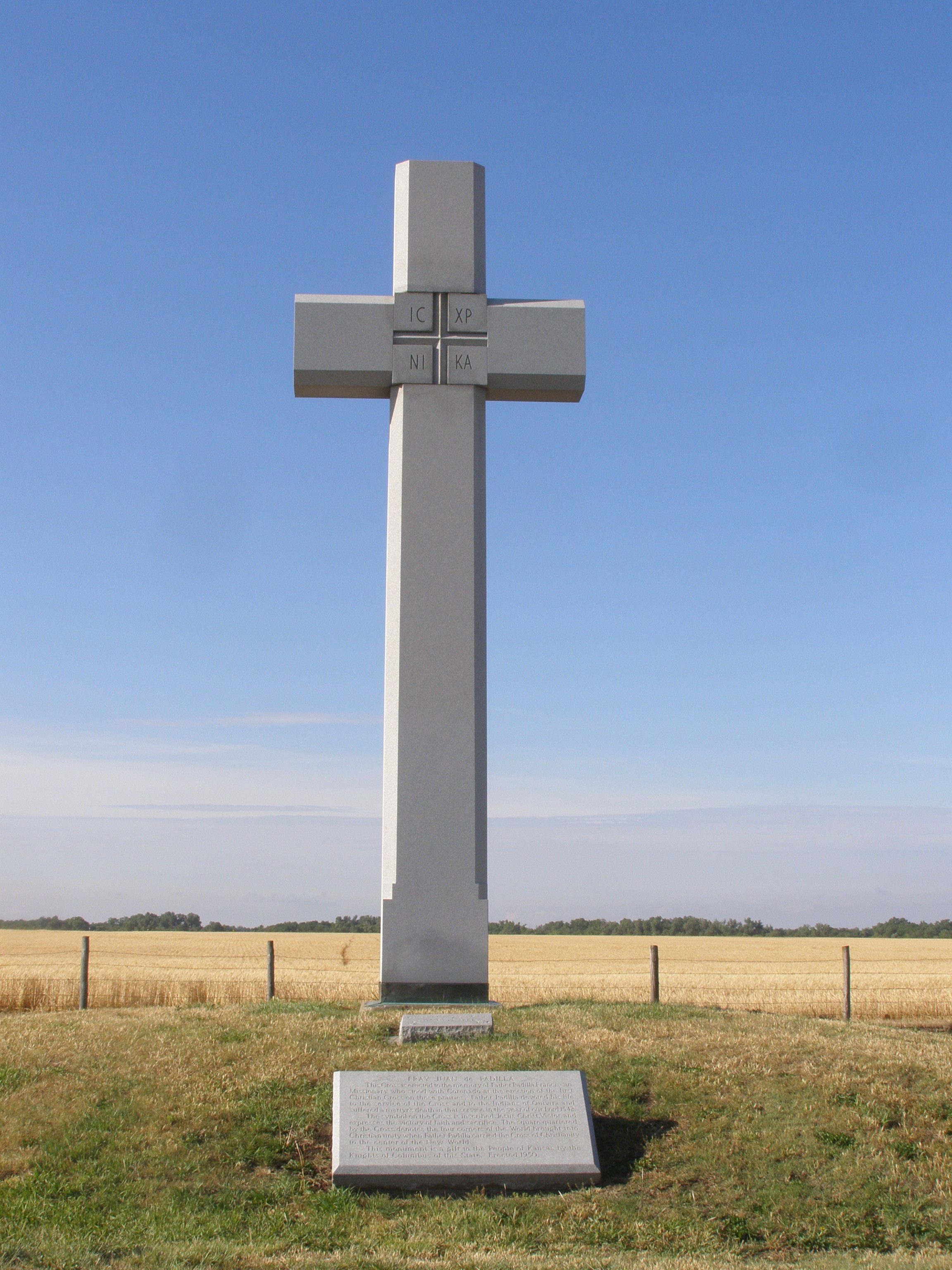
Cross in honor of Juan de Padilla near Lyons, Kansas.

In 1950, the Knights of Columbus erected a commemorative cross dedicated to Padilla near Lyons, Kansas. The stone marker reads:

This Cross is erected to the memory of Father Padilla, Franciscan Missionary, who stood with Coronado at the erection of the first Christian Cross on these prairies. Father Padilla devoted his life to the service of the Cross and to the Indians of Quivira and suffered a martyr's death in that service in the year of our Lord 1542.

The symbol on the Cross is inscribed, Jesus Christ, Victor, and expresses the victory of faith and sacrifice. The square, quartered by the Cross, denotes the four corners of the World brought into Christian unity when Father Padilla carried the Cross of Christianity to the center of the New World.

This monument is a gift to the people of Kansas by the Knights of Columbus of this State. Erected 1950.

== In popular culture ==
In the 1976 album Leftoverture by the American rock group Kansas, the first movement of Magnum Opus is entitled "Father Padilla Meets the Perfect Gnat".
