= San Agustín de la Isleta Mission =

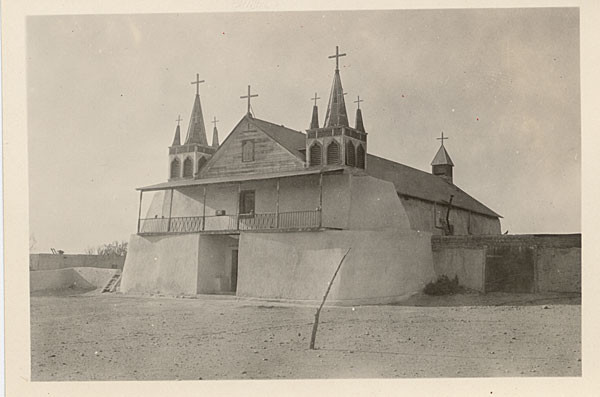
- San Agustín de la Isleta Mission, 1925

- Location within New Mexico
- 34°54′32.4″N 106°41′36.0″W
- Location: Isleta Pueblo, New Mexico
- Country: United States
- Denomination: Franciscan

History
- Founded: 1613 (construction finished in 1621)

Architecture
- Architect: Juan de Salas
- Completed: 1629/1630

San Agustín de la Isleta Mission, founded in 1613, was a Spanish Mission in what is now Bernalillo County, New Mexico, United States. It was a religious outpost established by Spanish Catholic Franciscans, to spread Christianity among the local Native Americans.

== History ==
Isleta Pueblo is the name of two pueblos of the ancient Tiwa (Spanish: Tigua) tribe, connected culturally and by language to other tribes of the Tanoan language family. Older historians thought they were related distantly to Shoshonean peoples. The San Agustin de la Isleta Mission was founded on the older pueblo, on the west bank of the Rio Grande about 13 miles (21 km) south of Albuquerque.

The original Isleta (i.e. islet) was so named by the Spaniards from its position on a tongue of land projecting into the stream; the native name, Shiewhibak, seems to refer to a knife used in connection with a certain ceremonial foot race. The village was first entered by the Spanish conquistador Francisco Vásquez de Coronado in 1540. In 1582-3, Antonio de Espejo visited the pueblo while trying to ascertain the fate of the Chamuscado and Rodríguez Expedition.

The Franciscan friar Juan de Salas came to New Mexico with Alonso de Benavides in 1622. Salas probably built the San Antonio "convent" at Isleta around 1629 or 1630. At a later period, the mission received many refugees from outlying pueblos abandoned because of Apache raids, By the outbreak of the Pueblo Revolt of 1680, it may have numbered 2000 people. The numerous Spanish settlers resisted the revolt with few casualties. They burned down the pueblo. The Tiwa accompanied some of the Spanish colonists, moving south to El Paso, Texas to the Ysleta Mission del Sur.

In 1692-3, Vargas reconquered the Pueblo country. The Crown allowed mission work to resume. In approximately 1710, the original pueblo was reoccupied by the Isleta people. A new mission was established there under the name of San Agustín.

With the growth of the Spanish settler population, the Native American missions decreased in importance. In 1780-1, one-third of the Pueblo population was swept away by a smallpox epidemic. The Spanish abandoned most of the missions at that time. San Agustin continued to operate the Pueblo of Isleta under Spanish and then Mexican rule for fifty years longer. After the region was acquired by the United States, whose mainstream population was then Protestant, the Catholic church became nearly secular.

Anton Docher arrived from Belgium in the late 19th century and was assigned to the Pueblo of Isleta after several years in the region. In 1923, he undertook a major remodeling of the Isleta mission, adding prominent French-style gothic spires on the adobe walls. The flat roof was replaced by a sloping one to avoid the water leaks, which frequently damaged the altar. In the late 20th century, the mission church was restored to its original structure. "The Padre of Isleta" spent 34 years (1891–1925) serving the community in Isleta; he was buried inside the church near the altar.

== See also ==
- Spanish missions in New Mexico
- List of churches in the Roman Catholic Archdiocese of Santa Fe
- Keleher, Julia M.; Chant, Elsie Ruth (2009). The Padre of Isleta: The Story of Father Anton Docher. Sunstone press Publishing. ISBN 978-0-86534-714-4.
- See a photograph of the mission in 1867

== Photos ==
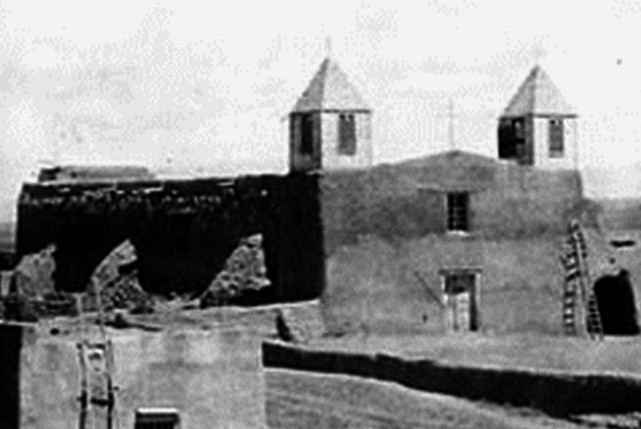
San Agustín de la Isleta Mission, 1880

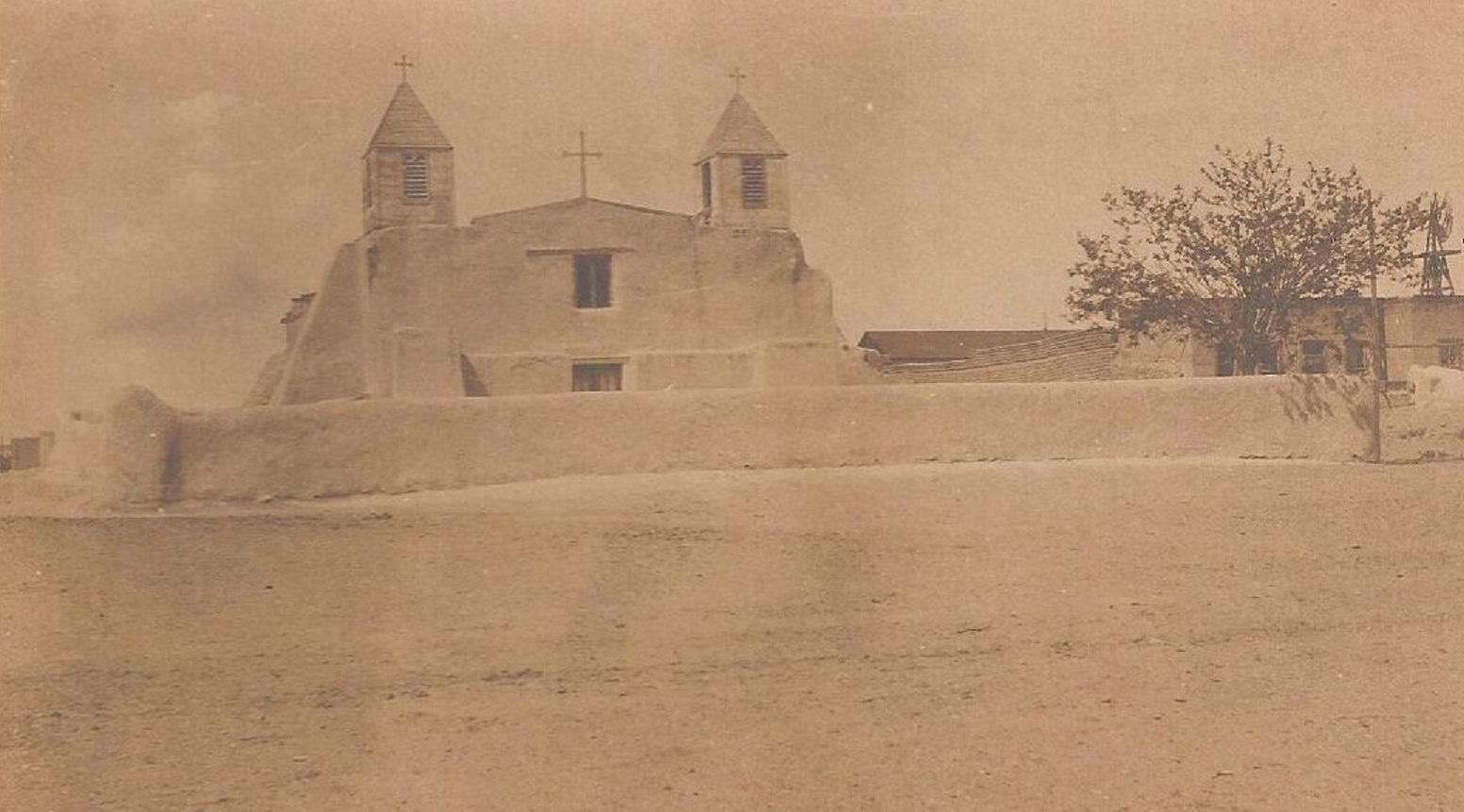
San Agustin de la Isleta mission Church, 1900
