= Philippe Morvan =

French writer

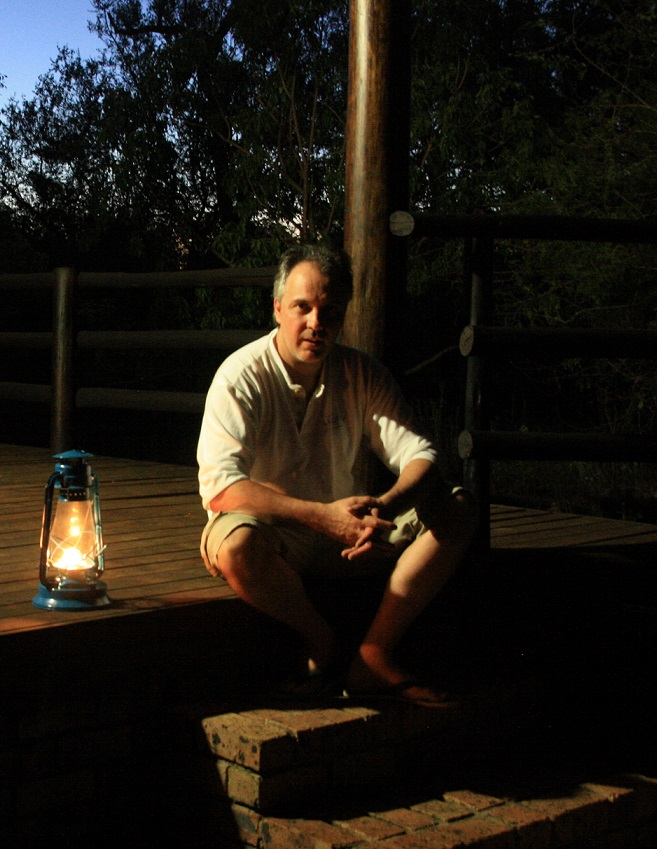
- Philippe Morvan in South Africa
- Born: November 10, 1962 (age 63); Clermont-Ferrand
- Occupations: hospital pharmacist, novelist
- Writing career
- Pen name: Samuel Gance
- Language: French
- Notable work: Ours (2018)

Philippe Morvan, alias Samuel Gance (born November 10, 1962, in Clermont-Ferrand), is a French writer who lives in Reunion Island and South Africa.

== Career ==
Originally from Auvergne, son of Yves Morvan, he first published a work for the Bibliothèque Verte Collection in Hachette Editions in 1981. He graduated from the Faculty of Pharmacy of Clermont-Ferrand and went to work in Italy then at Réunion in 1990 as a hospital pharmacist. He gives up writing until 2013, then he releases a first novel under the pseudonym of Samuel Gance. In 2018 he was noticed by Caroline Lépée, the publisher of Guillaume Musso, and published under his real name a first novel with Calmann-Lévy editions, entitled Ours (Bear). a story inspired by the life of one of his ancestors, Anton Docher, adventurer, missionary and friend of the Indians. He lives part of the year in Marloth Park in South Africa, where he wrote the novel Les fils du Ciel (The Sons of Heaven) in 2021 which tells the story of a young half-breed enlisted in the Anglo-Zulu and Anglo-Boer wars of the 19th century.

== Novels ==
=== Under the name of Philippe Morvan ===
- Le Triomphe des animaux. Bibliothèque verte (in French). Paris: Hachette. 1981. ISBN 978-2-0100-8028-9.
- Ours. Paris: Calmann-Lévy. 2018. ISBN 978-2-7021-6353-5.., republished in the Reader's Digest in October 2020
- Les Fils du Ciel (in French). Paris: Calmann-Lévy. 2021. ISBN 978-2-7021-6742-7., shortlisted for the Prix du roman métis des lecteurs 2021.
- L'envol du papangue (in French). Saint-Denis: Orphie. 2024. ISBN 979-1-0-2980-7015..

=== Under the name of Samuel Gance ===
- Anton ou la Trajectoire d'un Père (in French). Paris: l'Harmattan. 2013. ISBN 978-2-3362-9016-4..
- La Chapelle des Damnés (in French). Éditions Ex Aequo. 2013. ISBN 978-2-3596-2533-2..
- La Piste de l'Assassin (in French). Ex Æquo. 2014. ISBN 978-2-3596-2648-3..
- Derrière les Grilles (in French). Ex Æquo. 2015. ISBN 978-2-3596-2742-8..
- Le Territoire des Limbes (in French). Ex Æquo. 2015. ISBN 978-2-3596-2747-3..

== Bibliography ==
- Snodgrass, Mary Ellen (2015). Settlers of the American West: The Lives of 231 Notable Pioneers. McFarland & Company. ISBN 978-0-7864-9735-5..
