= Alicia R. Chacón =

American politician and judge (1938–2025)

Alicia Rosencrans Chacón (November 11, 1938 – November 25, 2025) was an American politician. She is best known for several firsts in El Paso, Texas. Chacón was the first woman elected to El Paso government when she became county clerk in 1974. She was also the first Hispanic woman to serve on the Ysleta Independent School District Board and as an alderman in El Paso. She later became the first woman and first Hispanic person in 100 years to serve as a judge for the El Paso area. A school, the Alicia R. Chacón International School is named after her.

== Early life ==
Chacón was born in Canutillo, Texas on November 11, 1938. She was raised in Ysleta in El Paso, Texas. She graduated from Ysleta High School in 1957. Chacón first became interested in politics in high school in 1956 when she met the liberal Democrat, Ralph Yarborough. Her father, Willie Rosencrans, encouraged her to work on his campaign for the United States Senate. Later, she married Joe C. Chacón and the couple had three children together.

== Career ==
Chacón became involved various leadership positions in El Paso. In 1966, she was serving as president of the El Paso County Employees Union and advocating for a salary increase for El Paso County employees. She was involved in the Democratic Party and was president of the Ysleta Elementary PTA. In April 1970, she was elected to the Ysleta Independent School Board. Chacón was the first Hispanic person to hold a seat on the Ysleta school board. She had decided to run for the school board in order to improve the poor conditions in Ysleta and Lower Valley schools. Chacón worked for the school board until 1978. In 1974, she became the first woman elected as an El Paso local government official when she was elected El Paso county clerk. In 1972 and 1976, she served as a Democratic Party national convention delegate.

Chacón was appointed the Small Business Administration regional director by President Jimmy Carter in 1978. She served until March 1979. Chacón resigned due to "political infighting over her qualifications." She was also appointed to serve on the commission to UNESCO. She was also the owner of El Paso restaurant, La Tapatia, Inc. in the late 1970s.

Between 1983 and 1987, she served two terms on the El Paso City Council. In her first race for alderman, she won against the incumbent, David Escobar. She was the first Hispanic woman to become an El Paso alderman. She was inducted into the Texas Women's Hall of Fame in 1986.

In 1990, Chacón was elected as an El Paso County Judge, becoming the first woman to serve in that capacity. She was also the first Hispanic person to serve as judge in more than 100 years. She served as judge until 1994, when she lost a primary challenge to Chuck Mattox. In 1995, an elementary school in Ysleta was named after her: the Alicia R. Chacón International School.

== Death ==
Chacon died in El Paso, Texas on November 25, 2025, at the age of 87. Her death was announced by El Paso County Commissioner Iliana Holguin on social media, who described her as "an incredible community leader and political trailblazer."

== See also ==
- List of Hispanic and Latino American jurists
