= Valle Verde =

Valle Verde may refer to:

- Valle Verde, Quintana Roo, community in the municipality of Benito Juárez, Quintana Roo, Mexico
- Valle Verde, Texas, census-designated place (CDP) in Webb County, Texas, United States

== See also ==
- Valle Verde Early College High School, high school located in El Paso, Texas
