= Jay J. Armes =

American private investigator (1932–2024)

- Born: Julian Jay Armas; August 12, 1932; El Paso, Texas, U.S.
- Died: September 19, 2024 (aged 92); El Paso, Texas, U.S.
- Occupations: Private investigator; author; actor
- Years active: 1949–2024
- Known for: Prosthetic hands
- Spouse: Linda Chew
- Children: 5

Jay J. Armes (born Julian Jay Armas; August 12, 1932 – September 19, 2024), was an American private investigator and actor. He was known for his prosthetic hands and a line of children's action figures based on his image.

== Early life and education ==
Armes was born to Mexican-American parents Pedro and Beatriz in Ysleta, a low-income area near El Paso, Texas, now a southeast El Paso neighborhood. His father was a grocer. At the age of eleven, he and his friend Dick Caples, seven years his senior, broke into a Texas & Pacific Railroad section house and stole railway torpedoes. Armes rubbed two torpedo sticks together, detonating them and causing the mangling of both hands. Caples, who was standing nearby, was not injured. Armes was taken to Hotel Dieu Hospital in El Paso, where his hands were amputated two inches above both wrists.

Armes went back to school four weeks after the surgery. Before he was fitted with prosthetics, he had a German Shepherd service dog named Butch. In school, he continued to play sports and learned to shoot a gun. He graduated from Ysleta High School at the age of fifteen. Armes said he earned degrees in criminology and psychology from New York University through correspondence courses, but no evidence could be found to support his claims.

== Career ==
Armes had a contract to work with Twentieth Century Fox in Hollywood from 1949 to 1955. While Armes claimed to have appeared in 39 movies and 28 television shows, the only verifiable credit is an appearance in an episode of Hawaii Five-O.

In 1956, he became the operations director of Goodwill Industries in El Paso, Texas. In 1958, after briefly working as an actor in California and returning to his native El Paso, Armes started his private investigative agency, The Investigators. He worked with an assistant, James Cheu, and would visit El Paso area high schools to talk about their work. During his time as an investigator, he was involved in a kidnapping case involving the son of Marlon Brando. He collected around $25,000, plus expenses, for that case. He was also allegedly involved in a jailbreak that later inspired the movie Breakout.

Armes ran for office as Justice of Peace in Precinct 2 in El Paso in 1970, but did not make it past the primaries.

In 1978, he launched The Investigators Security Course. Designed as a mobile patrol and security service, this branch of the organization served the community for a number of years until the patrol division was discontinued. Armes has been a certified Peace Officer.

From 1989 to 1993, he served on the El Paso City Council. He sought election to the council again in 2001, but was defeated and returned to his investigation business.

== Books and toys ==
In 1976, Armes published his autobiography, Jay J. Armes, Investigator; ISBN 0-02-503200-3. In 1976, the Ideal Toy Corp. also launched the Jay J. Armes Toy Line, which featured a Jay J. Armes action figure with detachable prosthetics, various gadgets, and a Mobile Investigation Unit.

== Television ==
Armes played the villain in the Hawaii Five-O episode, "Hookman" (September 11, 1973). The updated series, Hawaii Five-0, remade the episode with the same scenes and title on February 4, 2013; Peter Weller remade the role and directed the episode.

Armes' rescue of Marlon Brando's son was described on a season 7 episode of the Travel Channel show Mysteries at the Museum.

== Personal life ==
In the 1960s, Armes had a small private zoo in his home in the North Loop area. He raised German Shepherds, big cats and owned a chimpanzee. Later permits allowed him to keep the dogs and chimpanzee, own a cheetah, cougar, tapir, and several monkeys. Armes learned to drive, fly a jet plane and scuba dive. In 1977, he legally changed his name to Jay J. Armes.

He and his wife, Linda Chew, had three children. In September 2020, Armes put his El Paso estate up for sale.

Armes died in El Paso on September 19, 2024, at the age of 92.

== Awards and recognition ==
- 1975: featured in People Magazine as one of "The 25 Most Intriguing People" of the year
- 1976: received the "Golden Plate Achievement Award"
- 1977: featured in the Book of Lists
- 1979: selected as one of forty individuals honored as the "Most Successful Celebrities of America" by the Academy of Achievement in Beverly Hills, California
- 1981: featured in the book Dreaming and Winning in America
- 1989: received the "Most Successful Investigator in the Country" Award from the International Society of Private Investigators (ISPI)
- 1991: featured in the book Watching the detectives : the life and times of the private eyes
- 1992: honored as a member of the "Who's Who in Leading American Executives"
- 1994: featured in the Time Life book series, Crimes of Passion, along with son Jay J. Armes III, for their work on an international murder case
- 1997: featured in "The Hispanic-American Hall of Fame" poster, card set and learning guide
- 1998: Inducted into Investigator's Hall Of Fame, NAIS and named top ten investigators of the century for 1900s-NAIS. National Association Of Investigative Specialists
- 2016: Profiled in an episode of Snap Judgment titled "Jay J. Armes: Private Eye, Snap #721 - Fortress of Solitude."
