= Antonio de Otermín =

Spanish Governor of the northern New Spain province of Santa Fe de Nuevo México

26th Spanish Governor of New Mexico
- In office 1679 – 1680; 1680-1683 (in exile)
- Preceded by: Juan Francisco Treviño
- Succeeded by: Po'pay (Pueblo republic); Domingo Jironza Petriz de Cruzate (in exile)

Personal details
- Spouse: Ana María Ladrón de Guevara
- Profession: Political

Antonio de Otermín was the Spanish Governor of the northern New Spain province of Santa Fe de Nuevo México, today the U.S. states of New Mexico and Arizona, from 1678 to 1682. He was governor at the time of the Pueblo Revolt, during which the religious leader Popé led the Pueblo people in a military ouster of the Spanish colonists. Otermín had to cope with the revolt with help of the settlers and their descendants in New Mexico, fighting against the Pueblo in some military campaigns and establishing a refuge for the surviving settlers and loyal native Pueblo in the vicinity of the modern Ciudad Juárez, current Mexico.

== Biography ==
=== Early life ===
It is not known when or where he was born. It is assumed that he was born roughly between 1620 and 1630 in the Otermín family home, which in this time was recorded as Otromin House. It is located on the foothills of the Massif de Aralar, natural border between Gipuzkoa and Navarre, Spain. On the Gipuzkoa side is the house Otromin Haundi (‘Big Otromin’), which, by its size and name, was the ancestral home of the Otromin. However, two sources indicate that Otermín is the standard version and that it's from Guipúzcoan Basque oteme, in Spanish ‘árgoma’ ( ‘furze, broom’), the genera Ulex and Genista, spiny yellow-flowered evergreen leguminous shrubs.

=== Government of New Mexico and the Pueblo Revolt ===
Otermín was appointed governor of New Mexico in 1678. On August 9, 1680, two Pueblo leaders of the Galisteo Basin, allies of the Spanish, sent to Otermín the news of a rebellion of the Pueblo Amerindian against the Spanish. According to the message were two men from Tesuque who planned the attack on the Spanish cities and Franciscan missions. Because of that, he ordered the arrest of the messengers of the people. When the news about the arrest of the messengers was spread among the Pueblo, Popé decided to execute the plan of vengeance immediately. In the Pueblo Revolt, Popé's forces besieged Santa Fe, surrounding the city and cutting off its water supply.

Otermín assembled a council of war which decided to make a surprise attack on the Pueblo. On August 20, settlers and soldiers abandoned their fortified enclave and raided the Pueblo. However, the important number of weapons of the Pueblo was a fact and although the Otermín's army managed to defeat many Puebloans, the number of his soldiers killed was even greater. In fact, the Pueblo victory over the Otermín's government was such that, according to reports from the Pueblo captives, most of the people of the population of New Mexico had been killed by them. After the defeat of his army, Otermín and his council thought that if they wanted to survive of the Pueblo Revolt, they had to go to Isleta Pueblo, where had established the others people who had survived the revolt.

So, Otermín surrendered their arms to the settlers and, on August 21, they headed en masse at the Isleta Pueblo. After their arrival, they met another group of refugees who had arrived there a few weeks before them.

More late, to three days of his arrived, Otermín obtained the degree of lieutenant governor. On September 13, the number of refugees from Santa Fe overtook those from Isleta. Now, the insurgent population was already very large for fight against the Puebloans. Still, on that day, Otermín, being barricaded in the Palace of the Governors and believing that in northern New Mexico already all settlers had been killed by the Puebloans and he did not feel safe in the Isleta (although in reality the settlers of Santa Fe were alive and continued to resist the attacks of Puebloans), called for a general retreat. He and the Fray Cristóbal ordered to people of Isleta emigrate from New Mexico and on September 21 the Spanish settlers leave the capital city and headed to El Paso del Norte (current Ciudad Juárez), in order to plan the reconquer New Mexico. Five days later the settlers arrived to Salinetas, north of El Paso del Norte. Here lived up until the first week of October. At La Salineta was organized a meeting, so the number of persons accompanying to Otermín were (a least), 1,946. It was also decided to delay the re-conquest New Mexico, until the colonists do get the help of the viceroy and the advance of the group of people who were with Otermín at the Guadalupe mission, because of the dangers that had in El Paso del Norte. Thus, by October 9 the refugees already had arrived to two leagues downriver from the Guadalupe mission.

On September 16 came a group Queres warriors from Cochití and Santo Domingo led by mestizo Alonso de Catiti, whose brother was with the defenders of the governor's house in Santa Fe, New Mexico. He informed to the Spanish that the attackers of Santa Fe were 2,500 people and the city could not withstand their attacks. Otermín then blocked the Casa Real (Royal House), cutting the water supply, so the women and children, after exhausting their supplies in a few days, began to die of thirst. Because to that Otermín could not stand it any more, on August 21, he arranged the execution of 47 prisoners that he had captured in the combats and arranged a general exit to break the fence of the city. They succeeded it and in February, Otermín and his army went to El Paso (in the present Texas), along to many of the inhabitants of Isleta, while the others settlers fled to south and interior of Parral, Chihuahua and west into Sonora. New Mexico was already in hard of Puebloans.

In November 1681 Otermín attempted to return to New Mexico, burning both Isleta Pueblo (which had not taken part in the revolt) and Sandía Pueblo. He returned to modern Isleta del Sur, near El Paso, with some prisoners, but little else.

In Isleta Pueblo, the settlers were attacked by the Puebloans, but they were defeated. So Otermín held a ceremony in which he re-established the Spanish power in the region and spared the natives for their actions. Otermín also gave large amounts of corn of local inhabitants, as was claimed by them, although gave scarce amounts in the Isleta.

After the victory of Otermín, he sent to Juan Domínguez de Mendoza and a company of Hispanic men and Pueblo allies to north, to the Tiwa and Keres lands of Albuquerque and Bernalillo. There Mendoza spoke with Pueblo leaders who told him that his people had the intention of attacking and killing the settlers to return to the region. Therefore, Mendoza ordered the settlers were directed to Isleta, where was the governor. Otermín traveled with his army to northern New Mexico, but there he found that the region of the Puebloans was empty. Perhaps for fear of planning a new attack, he decided to reconvene several councils of war.

In August 1682, Otermín fell ill so he requested to be replaced in the government of New Mexico, being replaced by Domingo Jironza Pétriz de Cruzate. In this year, he, along with Fray Francisco de Ayeta founded La Misión de Corpus Christi de San Antonio de la Ysleta del Sur in Ysleta, Texas.

== Personal life ==
Antonio Otermín married Ana María Ladrón de Guevara on 24 May 1692 in Asunción, Mexico, one of the survivors of the Pueblo Indian Revolt. There are no data about his death.

== See also ==
- Sandia Pueblo
