= Josh Kirkland (coach) =

American football coach

Biographical details
- Born: Levelland, Texas, U.S.
- Education: West Texas A&M University (2009); Grand Canyon University (2014)

Coaching career (HC unless noted)
- 2009–2011: Daingerfield HS (TX) (WR)
- 2012–2014: Rudder HS (TX) (ST/WR)
- 2015: Westbury HS (TX) (OC/QB)
- 2016: Parkland HS (TX)
- 2017: Lehman HS (TX)
- 2018–2019: Incarnate Word (AHC/RB)
- 2020–2021: New Mexico Highlands
- 2022: Southwestern Oklahoma State

Administrative career (AD unless noted)
- 2016: Parkland HS (TX)
- 2017: Lehman HS (TX)
- 2023: North Texas (General manager)

Head coaching record
- Overall: 10–13 (college); 19–13 (high school)
- Bowls: 1-0

Joshua Kirkland is an American college football coach. He was last the general manager/offensive assistant for University of North Texas, a position he held in 2023. He was the head football coach for New Mexico Highlands University from 2020 to 2021, Southwestern Oklahoma State University in 2022, Parkland High School in 2016, and Lehman High School in 2017. He also coached for Daingerfield High School, Rudder High School, Westbury High School and Incarnate Word.

== Head coaching record ==
=== College ===
Year	Team	Overall	Conference	Standing	Bowl/playoffs
New Mexico Highlands Cowboys (Rocky Mountain Athletic Conference) (2020–2021)
2020–21	New Mexico Highlands	1–0	0–0	N/A	
2021	New Mexico Highlands	5–6	4–5	T–5th	
New Mexico Highlands:		6–6	4–5		
Southwestern Oklahoma State Bulldogs (Great American Conference) (2022)
2022	Southwestern Oklahoma State	4–7	4–7	7th	
Southwestern Oklahoma State:		4–7	4–7		
Total:		10–13			

=== High school ===
Year	Team	Overall	Conference	Standing	Bowl/playoffs
Parkland Matadors () (2016)
2016	Parkland	18–4	10–3	4th	
Parkland:		8–4	5–3		
Lehman Lobos () (2017)
2017	Lehman	1–9	0–6	7th	
Lehman:		1–9	0–6		
Total:		9–13			
