= J. M. Hanks High School =

Public school in Texas, United States

Location
- 2001 Lee Trevino; El Paso, TX; United States; 31.771092°N 106.319536°W

Information
- Type: Public, Secondary
- Motto: It's a great day to be a Knight
- School district: Ysleta Independent School District
- Principal: Daniel Gutierrez
- Staff: 107.15 (FTE)
- Grades: 9-12
- Enrollment: 1,495 (2020–21)
- Student to teacher ratio: 13.95
- Campus type: Urban
- Colors: Silver, black, and red
- Athletics conference: 5A-D1
- Mascot: Silver Knight
- Yearbook: The Shield
- Website: www.yisd.net/o/hankshigh

J. M. Hanks High School, commonly referred to as Hanks High School, is one of seven public secondary schools in Ysleta Independent School District, which encompasses much of east El Paso, Texas. Hanks' primary feeder school is J.M. Hanks Middle School. Additionally, many students from nearby Eastwood Middle School go on to attend Hanks High School.

== History ==
J.M. Hanks High School is named in honor of former Ysleta superintendent Jesse Mack Hanks, who retained the position for a full fifty years from approximately 1939 until his death in 1989. For his extended service to the district, Hanks was awarded an honorary Doctor of Laws from New Mexico State University in nearby Las Cruces, New Mexico in 1965 and was named superintendent emeritus by Ysleta.

The school was opened in 1978 to accommodate El Paso's eastward expansion and to ease overcrowding at nearby Eastwood High School, which lies 2.5 miles to the west of Hanks. The school initially enrolled seventh, eighth and ninth graders comprising the classes that would graduate in 1982, 1983 and 1984. The class of 1985 was added for the 1979–80 school year as those students became seventh-graders. As those four classes "moved up" each year, the student body thus remained virtually intact until Hanks reached standard high school set of grades 9-12 for the 1981–82 school year. Hanks' enrollment had reached 1,800 by 1980, with the inaugural class graduating 372 students in May 1982.

== Student publications ==
Hanks High School has four student-run publications, each produced in a different media. The Exeter is an annual magazine that is filled with student-submitted content including poems, short stories, and drawings, all based around the year's chosen theme. Scriptoria is the monthly news and features magazine (formerly a newspaper) that consists of current events ranging in scope from the small-scale school news to world news, as well as movie reviews, restaurant reviews, and editorials. It also manages [www.hanksmedia.com]. Hanks' yearbook is entitled The Shield and the theme of the book is chosen by the student staff at the beginning of each year. The Shield has won national awards in the past for its originality. Starting in 2003 the Shield Yearbook also started producing a DVD that highlights the year's events. KnightVision News is the student-run daily 10-minute closed-circuit television broadcast, and consists of school announcements, news, weather, sports and special features. It is produced by students in the Advanced Broadcast Journalism class.

== Athletics and athletic coaches ==
- Baseball
- Boys Basketball
- Boys Soccer
- Boys Track
- Boys Wrestling
- Cheerleading
- Football
- Girls Basketball
- Girls Soccer
- Girls Track
- Golf
- Softball
- Swimming
- Tennis
- Volleyball

== Clubs and organizations ==
- AVID
- Academic Decathlon
- Art Club
- Band & Flags- Silver Knights Marching Band
- Business Professionals of America
- Chess
- Choir
- Citizen Bee
- Close Up
- Crime Stoppers
- DECA
- Destination Imagination
- Drama
- Eco Club
- Exeter
- Future Business Leaders of America
- Future Career Consumer Leaders of America
- Future Homemakers of America
- Guitar Club
- Home Economics Related Occupations
- High Q
- Interact
- Intramurals
- Knight Force
- Knight Players (Theatre)
- KnightVision News
- Knights for Christ
- Mariachi
- Math Club
- Mock Trial
- Momentum
- National Honor Society
- Orchestra
- Pure Movement
- FRC Robotics
- Lego Robotics
- ROTC
- Scriptoria
- Secular Student Alliance
- Shield Yearbook
- Silhouettes Dance Team
- Social Studies Club
- Speech & Debate
- Student Council
- Teen Volunteer Corps
- Winter Color Guard
- Young Scholars' Bowl

== UIL Championships ==
- Band, 1986 UIL Wind Ensemble State Champion
- Girls Wrestling, 2014, 2015, 2016, 2017, 2018 and 2019 (6 straight State Championships)

- Boys Golf, 1995

== Notable alumni ==
- Gabe Camarillo, United States Under Secretary of the Army
- Ara Celi, Actress
- Mark Grudzielanek, Professional Baseball Player
- Ginger Kerrick, American physicist and first Hispanic female NASA Flight Director at NASA's Lyndon B. Johnson Space Center
- Bruce Ruffin, Major League Baseball Pitcher
- Ryan Stout, Comedian
- Ryan Piers Williams, Filmmaker
- Alan Zinter, Professional Baseball Player
- Gigi Causey, Production manager, Oscar nominee for best short film
- Danny Perez, Professional Baseball Player
- Leon Schydlower, U.S. Federal Judge, Western District of Texas
