= La Tapatia, Inc. =

Mexican restaurant in El Paso, TX

La Tapatia, Inc. is a Mexican restaurant and tortilla factory located in the Ysleta neighborhood of El Paso, Texas. The restaurant has been at the same location for over 65 years and is especially known for their tamales. Over time, the restaurant has had several owners, including Alicia R. Chacón. In the 1970s, La Tapatia sponsored a softball team that was also known as "The Tamale Kings."

== About ==
La Tapatia is located in the Ysleta neighborhood of El Paso, Texas and has been in business at the same location for over 65 years. Its Mexican food is influenced by Borderland culture and they are well-known for their tamales. The El Paso Times has written that La Tapatia is one of the city's "can't miss tamales." La Tapatia makes their own masa for their tamales. Other dishes served for breakfast and lunch include enchiladas, chile rellenos, and rolled tacos.

The restaurant has also participated in events by sending large amounts of tamales to other parts of Texas.

== History ==
La Tapatia was originally a tortilla factory that was founded by Marcelino and Felipa Galvan in the early 1950s. The Galvan's daughter, Santos Garcia, worked as a tamalera at the restaurant, and continued to do so into her 70s.

In 1970, the factory was sold to Gus and Ted Rallis, who later moved the restaurant to its final location. In July 1971, a request was made to the city to rezone 61,008 square feet of land for commercial use for the new spot In July 1972, the permits were approved for building at the new location. During a corn husk shortage in 1973, Ted Rallis had to temporarily substitute parchment wrappings for their tamales.

El Paso politician, Alicia R. Chacón, looked into buying La Tapatia in 1979. Chacón eventually used her retirement funds and winnings from raffle tickets at a church event in San Antonio to purchase the restaurant in March of that year. She went into business with Edward Alvarez and his wife. When Chacón worked as an alderman in the early 1980s, her husband, Joe Chacón, ran the restaurant. In 1989, the restaurant was selling around 300 dozen tamales every day. In the early 90s, Chacon sold her interest in the restaurant to her sister. Esther Rosencrans was the owner of the restaurant in 1994.

In 2021, La Tapatia was featured with author, Sergio Troncoso, on La Frontera with Pati Jinich which airs on PBS.

=== Sports ===
La Tapatia sponsored a softball team in the 1970s. The team was part of the El Paso Major Softball League and the players were known as "The Tamale Kings." One player for the Tapatia team, Paul "Hoss" Lopez, was nominated for the El Paso Athletic Hall of Fame in 1972.
