= Mike Williams (American football, born 1957) =

American football player (1957–2013)

No. 40, 83
- Positions: Fullback, tight end

Personal information
- Born: October 14, 1957; New Kingstown, Pennsylvania, U.S.
- Died: December 23, 2013 (aged 56); El Paso, Texas, U.S.
- Listed height: 6 ft 3 in (1.91 m)
- Listed weight: 222 lb (101 kg)

Career information
- High school: Parkland (El Paso)
- College: New Mexico (1975–1978)
- NFL draft: 1979: 8th round, 195th overall pick

Career history
- Kansas City Chiefs (1979–1981)

Awards and highlights
- WAC Offensive Player of the Year (1978)

Career NFL statistics
- Rushing yards: 261
- Rushing average: 3.7
- Rushing touchdowns: 1
- Receiving touchdowns: 3
- Stats at Pro Football Reference

Michael Anthony Williams (October 14, 1957 – December 23, 2013) was an American professional football player who played three seasons with the Kansas City Chiefs of the National Football League (NFL). He was selected by the Chiefs in the eighth round of the 1979 NFL draft after playing college football at the University of New Mexico.

== Early life ==
Michael Anthony Williams was born on October 14, 1957, in New Kingstown, Pennsylvania. He attended Parkland High School in El Paso, Texas.

== College career ==
He lettered for the New Mexico Lobos from 1975 to 1978. He rushed 121 times for 511 yards and three touchdowns while catching ten passes for 66 yards and two touchdowns his freshman year in 1975. In 1976, he recorded 258 rushing attempts for 1,240 yards and nine touchdowns, and nine receptions for 161 yards and two touchdowns. His rushing attempts, rushing yards, and rushing touchdowns all led the Western Athletic Conference (WAC) that season. In 1977, he rushed 265 times for 1,096 yards, and six touchdowns while catching nine passes for 150 yards. He led the WAC in carries for the second straight season. His senior year in 1978, Williams totaled 213 carries for 1,015 yards, and nine touchdowns, and 17 receptions for 112 yards, earning WAC Offensive Player of the Year honors. He once again led the WAC in carries, rushing yards, and rushing touchdowns.

== Professional career ==
Williams was selected by the Kansas City Chiefs in the eighth round, with the 195th overall pick, of the 1979 NFL draft. He signed with the team on June 16. He played in 14 games, starting three, for the Chiefs during his rookie season in 1979 and was listed as a fullback. He rushed 69 times for 261 yards and one touchdown that season while catching 16 passes for 129 yards and two touchdowns. Williams was listed as a tight end in 1980 and played in all 16 games, starting 11, but only recorded two receptions for nine yards and a touchdown. He appeared in three games for the Chiefs in 1981 before being placed on injured reserve on September 22, 1981. Williams was released on August 10, 1982.

== Death ==
Williams died of heart failure on December 23, 2013, in El Paso, Texas.
