= Mike Jefferson (American football) =

American football player (born 1982)

- Jefferson (85), week 1 of the 2008 season.

No. 85
- Position: Wide receiver

Personal information
- Born: December 28, 1982 (age 43); El Paso, Texas, U.S.
- Listed height: 6 ft 1 in (1.85 m)
- Listed weight: 206 lb (93 kg)

Career information
- High school: Parkland (TX)
- College: Montana State
- NFL draft: 2007: undrafted

Career history
- Dallas Cowboys (2007–2008); Buffalo Bills (2008–2009)*; Dallas Cowboys (2009)*
- * Offseason or practice squad member only

Awards and highlights
- All-Big Sky (2006)

Michael Jefferson (born December 28, 1982) is an American former football wide receiver in the National Football League (NFL) for the Dallas Cowboys and Buffalo Bills. He played college football at Montana State.

== Early life ==
Jefferson attended Parkland High School. As a senior, he had 29 receptions for 954 yards, 11 receiving touchdowns, 10 carries for 216 yards, 2 rushing touchdowns, 2 punt returns for touchdowns, 60 tackles and 2 interceptions. He received All-city and All-district honors.

He also practiced basketball and track.

== College career ==
=== University of Arizona ===
Jefferson accepted a football scholarship from the University of Arizona. As a freshman in 2003, he recorded 16 receptions for 214 yards and two touchdowns.

As a sophomore, he posted 16 receptions for 249 yards and three touchdowns. As a junior in 2005, he recorded only 4 receptions for 64 yards and no touchdowns.

=== Montana State University ===
In 2006, he transferred to Montana State University to take advantage of an NCAA rule, which allowed a player to transfer down a division and be eligible to play the same year.

In his one season at Montana State, he recorded 66 receptions for 1,023 yards and nine touchdowns. His 1,450 all-purpose yards led the Big Sky Conference. He set a school record with 305 all-purpose yards against Idaho State University, including 207 receiving yards. He left with two of the school's top five receiving games.

== Professional career ==
=== Dallas Cowboys (first stint) ===
Jefferson was signed as an undrafted free agent by the Dallas Cowboys after the 2007 NFL draft. He was waived on September 1 and signed to the practice squad two days later.

On September 8, 2008, he was released after playing in the season opener. On September 10, he was re-signed to the practice squad. He was promoted to the active roster the day before the season opener to serve as the team’s fourth wide receiver due to injuries at the position, but did not play. He tested positive for taking a banned supplement and was suspended four games. On October 29, he was released from the practice squad after being reinstated by the league.

=== Buffalo Bills ===
On November 26, 2008, he was signed by the Buffalo Bills to their practice squad. He was released on May 21, 2009.

=== Dallas Cowboys (second stint) ===
On May 28, 2009, Jefferson was re-signed by the Dallas Cowboys. He was released September 5.

== Personal life ==
In the early summer of 2014, Jefferson served in the United States Air Force Reserve 610th Security Forces Squadron. Jefferson is now currently serving as a patrolman under the AGR program with the 452nd Security Forces Squadron at March ARB, California.
