= David Leonard Wood =

American serial killer (born 1957)

- Leonard 1993 Mugshot
- Born: June 20, 1957 (age 69); San Angelo, Texas, U.S.
- Other name: "The Desert Killer"
- Convictions: Capital murder (x6); Sexual assault Kidnapping; Indecency with a child
- Penalty: Death

Details
- Victims: 6–9
- Span of crimes: May 30 – August 28, 1987 (confirmed)
- Country: United States
- State: Texas
- Date apprehended: October 27, 1987
- Imprisoned at: Allan B. Polunsky Unit, West Livingston, Texas

David Leonard Wood (born June 20, 1957), known as The Desert Killer, was convicted of raping and killing at least six girls and women in El Paso, Texas between May and August 1987, and later burying their bodies in the desert. He was sentenced to death, and was most recently scheduled to be executed on March 13, 2025, but his execution was postponed again. For four decades, Wood has denied he committed the crimes. In September 2026, a judge granted Wood's request for additional DNA testing of evidence from the killings.

== Early life ==
Wood was born on June 20, 1957, in San Angelo, Texas, the second of four children. In the 1960s, his father, Leo, moved the family to a luxurious neighborhood in El Paso, where he held an executive position with the El Paso Electric Company. While the family was considered well off, their private life was troublesome, as Wood's mother Betty, who had started showing signs of mental illness, began to frequently argue with his father. In turn, his father would beat him with a paddle whenever he misbehaved.

In the mid-1960s, Betty Wood was committed to a psychiatric hospital for six months, where she was treated via electroconvulsive therapy. While she was allowed to return home after her release, she was prescribed drugs that she later began abusing, further deteriorating her mental health. Due to the numerous problems between them, Wood's parents paid little to no attention to their children, due to which David and his siblings were sent off to live with relatives in Chaparral, New Mexico, and spent time in foster homes.

From an early age, Wood was described as nervous and hyperactive, so much so that he was admitted to a hospital and given medical treatment, due to which he had to repeat the first grade of school. Eventually, he lost all interest in school, and due to his failing grades and truancy, he had to repeat the third and ninth grades. By his own admission, he also claimed that he began feeling sexual attraction towards girls at an early age and lost his virginity at age 12.

In the early 1970s, Wood began spending most of his free time outdoors, during which he developed an addiction to alcohol and drugs. In 1974, at the age of 17, he quit Parkland High School after the ninth grade and attempted to enlist in the Army, but was rejected. Because of this, Wood resorted to doing manual labor and odd jobs to make a living for a few years.

According to his appeals, Wood is a member of the Aryan Brotherhood of Texas.

== Early criminal activity ==
On August 30, 1976, Wood was arrested on charges of indecency with a 12-year-old girl, for which he was convicted the following year and given a 5-year prison sentence. After serving approximately two years, he was granted parole and released on December 28, 1978.

In March 1980, he committed, and was found guilty, of two rapes only eight days apart: in the first incident, he raped a 19-year-old female acquaintance, and in the second, he raped a 13-year-old girl whom he did not know. He was soon after found guilty and given a 20-year sentence, and during his incarceration, Wood developed a reputation as a model inmate and underwent several sex offender rehabilitation programs.

After serving only six years of his sentence, Wood was again granted parole and released on January 14, 1987, whereupon he returned to El Paso. Shortly afterwards, he found a job at a furniture store, but occasionally moonlighted as a laborer and auto mechanic. In his spare time, Wood frequented various bars and nightclubs, favoring those with topless dancers. In addition, he was acquainted and even became a member of a motorcycle club, as this activity had become a keen interest of his during his imprisonment. With his self-described “charismatic” personality, long hair, and many tattoos, Wood has claimed to have been popular amongst young girls and young adult women. He claims to have had “many admirers and multiple girlfriends”, one of whom even became his permanent roommate.

== Murders ==
=== Disappearances ===
Between February and August 1987, nine girls and women aged between 13 and 24 went missing in the El Paso area. The first of them was 14-year-old Marjorie Knox, who disappeared on February 14. She lived in Chaparral, New Mexico, a suburb of El Paso, but on that day, she had gone to the city to attend a Valentine's Day party in Veterans Park with friends. Three weeks later, on March 7, 13-year-old Melissa Alaniz also went missing. Both girls' parents knew each other, as they worked at the Rockwell Company. Alaniz's parents told police that in the months prior to her disappearance, their daughter had been going through puberty and had become acquainted with a group of young men with criminal records.

On June 7, El Paso police received a report concerning the disappearance of 15-year-old Desiree Wheatley. During their investigation, several witnesses claimed that they had last seen her five days prior in the company of a man with numerous tattoos on his arms at a convenience store. Wheatley attended H.E. Charles Junior High School, lived near Wood's home and was not known to consume alcohol or use drugs.

Three days later, the police received another report about the disappearance of 20-year-old Karen Baker, who was last seen alive on June 5 on the grounds of the Hawaiian Royale Motel. The case proved tough, as witnesses gave conflicting accounts of her actions prior to her disappearance, with her own mother claiming that she had been kidnapped and taken to Mexico, prompting the FBI to investigate her claim.

On June 28, 19-year-old Cheryl Lynn Vasquez-Dismukes, an employee at a local Whataburger, went missing in El Paso, after going to buy cigarettes at a Circle K. According to witnesses, she was last seen talking to a man in a pickup truck. On July 3, a 17-year-old girl named Angelica Jeannette Frausto was also reported missing. The latter girl was a repeat runaway since the age of 12, and often absent from home for days and even months. At age 15, she dropped out of Henderson Middle School before taking on a job as a dancer at Red Flame, a bar frequented by Wood. During the investigation, police discovered that on the day of her disappearance, Frausto was given a motorcycle ride by one of her biker friends.

A month later, on August 20, the parents of 24-year-old Rosa Maria Casio contacted the police. They claimed that she had been visiting her sister in Ciudad Juárez on August 12, and in the evening, she went to El Paso by car to buy postage stamps, but then vanished. On the following morning, her 1974 Ford Gran Torino was found abandoned at a street, with Casio's belongings still inside it. Interviews with local residents provided no useful information relating to her vanishing. Casio worked as a topless dancer in a bar in El Paso, but according to her parents, she was not involved in prostitution and planned to enroll in Dallas College Brookhaven Campus to complete her education.

In September 1987, 14-year-old Dawn Marie Smith, a student at Parkland High School, was reported missing. She had gotten into an argument with her parents in June before running away from home, saying that she would never return. She remained in contact with some of her family members until August 28, when all contact ceased. Local informants told police officers that Smith had been shot and killed by a biker on a property in Chaparral, but this has never been conclusively verified.

== Location of remains, investigation, and arrest ==
On September 4, El Paso Water Utilities workers found Casio's remains in a shallow grave in the desert northeast of the city. Police were called to the crime scene and, while investigating the area with K-9 units, accidentally discovered Baker's remains about 100 meters away in another shallow grave. Both were identified by family members via their clothing and personal items found at the crime scene. Casio's cause of death was tentatively ruled as strangulation because her jaw had been broken in two places, but Baker's could not be determined due to her body's advanced state of decomposition.

On September 19, El Paso police were contacted by Judith Kelling Brown, a prostitute and drug addict who lived in the area. She told them that on one day between July 26 and August 7, she met a young man who lured her into his pickup truck with the promise of driving her home. According to her, the man missed the right turn and explained that he would take her back after he first visited his friend, whereupon he stopped outside an apartment building and went inside. When he returned about three minutes later, a rope was dangling from one of his pockets.

Brown claimed that the man then drove her to the northeastern section of the town towards the desert, in the opposite direction of where her house was. He explained to her that there was a shipment of cocaine buried there and he had to get it, and after some time, he stopped the truck, got out, and told her to exit as well. He then pulled a blanket and shovel from the back of the truck, and then tied her to the vehicle at gunpoint. After digging a hole in the ground, he proceeded to rape her before attempting to strangle her but could not finish as some passers-by were approaching. The man then took Kelling to another spot in the desert and raped her at gunpoint again, but as passers-by interrupted again, he abandoned her and fled.

After finishing her testimony, Kelling indicated on a map the alleged location of the attack and was asked to look at five photographs of criminals convicted of similar crimes in the past. One of the men was Wood, whom she positively identified as her assailant.

On October 20, hikers accidentally discovered the remains of Wheatley and Smith, both of whom were buried in shallow graves close to one another and about 1.5 kilometers away from those of Casio and Baker. The location where they were found matched the area where Kelling testified that she had been attacked by Wood, making him a suspect in the murders.

After re-interviewing witnesses to the girls' disappearances, investigators learned that Casio had been seen in the company of Wood shortly before she vanished. Charles Lloyd, a witness in the Baker case, told them that Wood knew the victim and often gave her rides on his motorcycle, and on the day of her disappearance, Baker had gotten into a beige pickup truck that closely matched Wood's own vehicle. Friends and acquaintances of Smith also testified that she knew Wood, as they had repeatedly suggested that she go out with him. Based on these facts, Wood was arrested on charges of kidnapping and raping Kelling on October 23, 1987, to which he pleaded not guilty.

Two weeks later, another shallow grave was discovered not far from where Wheatley and Smith had been found, with the victim being identified as Frausto.

On March 14, 1988, a couple searching for aluminum cans in the desert stumbled upon the partially buried remains of a woman, located only a few hundred meters away from where the other victims had been found. Based on a comparison of X-rays and jaws, the woman was identified as 23-year-old Ivy Susanna Williams, a Colorado native who had moved to El Paso after getting married. Williams was last seen on May 30, but her disappearance was not reported by either family or friends. During interviews with acquaintances, police determined that she had worked as a dancer at a club and was affiliated with members of the biker subculture. The coroner's report also found that Williams had been stabbed multiple times, including to the face. As she was found in an area that had previously been searched, the El Paso Police Department resumed an operation to locate more potential burial sites, which turned up nothing new.

On June 16, 1988, Wood was found guilty of kidnapping and raping Kelling. The fact that he was on parole at the time was considered an aggravating factor, and he was sentenced to a total of 50 years imprisonment.

== Murder trial ==
After Wood's conviction, police obtained a search warrant for his car, personal items, and apartment based on testimony from friends and acquaintances of the murdered girls and women, all of whom claimed that they had last seen him in each of the victim's company. Wood's roommate told police that in the fall of 1987, shortly before his arrest, he had carefully cleaned the interior of his car of various debris with a vacuum cleaner. Because Kelling claimed that before committing the rape, Wood had taken a shovel and a blanket out of his truck, police concentrated their efforts on finding the blanket.

While searching his apartment, police seized a vacuum cleaner, in the bag of which they found yellow and orange colored fibers. Upon analyzing them, experts concluded that the lint found inside the bag matched the samples of lint found on the victims' clothing. Wood's roommate testified during questioning that he had kept an orange-colored blanket and a number of different shovels in the back of the truck throughout the year.

After his arrest, Wood was placed in the county jail, where a number of other inmates claimed that he boasted of his crimes, describing the victims as topless dancers and prostitutes whom he had lured into his truck with the offer of sharing drugs, but instead drove them to the desert, tied them to his truck, then raped and killed them before burying the bodies in shallow graves near roads. The El Paso County District Attorney's Office charged Wood with the murders of Williams, Wheatley, Baker, Frausto, Casio, and Smith. The bodies of Knox, Vasquez-Dismukes, and Alaniz were never found and their fate remains unknown, but Wood remains the sole suspect in their respective cases.

Since the announcement of the charges, Wood and his attorneys attempted to delay the start of the trial using multiple legal avenues. Their first attempt was to have a change of venue to Dallas, as the attorneys claimed that the intense publicity surrounding the killings would prejudice the jury against their client. Eventually, after a series of pretrial hearings, the motion was granted, with the trial date being set for September 1992.

Throughout the proceedings, Wood insisted on his innocence and stated that he knew many girls in the northeastern El Paso area, many of whom continued to communicate with him even after his arrest. As a convicted criminal, he admitted to analyzing methods of kidnapping and raping women without risking being arrested but claimed that he had not murdered anyone, saying that if he were to do that, he would have buried the bodies in a mountainous area where not even coyotes would find them. At one court hearing, Wood admitted to being present at the parking lot on the day when Vasquez-Dismukes had disappeared, but denied being the one responsible, claiming that he had been with a 16-year-old girl that night and even gave her name, which was later corroborated. He also admitted under pressure that he was acquainted with Baker, but claimed that they had dated five months prior to her disappearance. When pressed about the murders of Wheatley and Smith, Wood claimed that he had never met them.

In November 1992, the jury found Wood guilty of the six murders and was officially sentenced to death on January 14, 1993.

== Aftermath ==
Since his conviction, Wood has continued to insist on his innocence, and with the help of his attorneys, he has filed several appeals. Thus far all of these have been denied. His original execution date was scheduled for August 20, 2009, but the day prior to that, it was postponed due to a legal appeal filed by his lawyers, who claimed that their client showed signs of mental disability. The execution of mentally disabled offenders was deemed unconstitutional following the ruling of Atkins v. Virginia by the Supreme Court in 2002.

Wood's attorneys provided the court with evidence that their client had taken six IQ tests from 1977 to 2011, with his scores being in the following chronological order: 111, 64, 71, 101, 67, and 57. However, because the tests were categorized by age group and showed a person's development appropriate to his age, the records did not provide details about which versions of the tests Wood took when he was younger, leading to the dismissal of his appeal in 2014. After reviewing the legal document, the Texas Court of Criminal Appeals ruled that the forensic psychiatric findings were questionable and the psychologists' methods for assessing Wood's adaptive functioning were not thorough or reliable. Thusly, the court ruled that Wood and his attorneys had failed to produce clear evidence of his alleged intellectual impairment.

In subsequent years, no new execution date was set, as Wood's lawyers filed another post-conviction appeal in 2016 to have his sentence overturned and a new trial scheduled. They also petitioned for a new trial based on findings of DNA testing, claiming that this would prove their client's innocence. The El Paso County District Attorney's Office provided a yellow shirt that one of the victims, Dawn Smith, had been wearing at the time of her death and on which biological traces from a male contributor were extracted. Also among the items to be used for the DNA test were Angelica Frausto's pantyhose, jacket and pieces of her hair; pieces of Desiree Wheatley's hair and a bloodstained knife found among Wood's personal possession, which prosecutors believed was used in the murder of Ivy Williams. In addition, they demanded that documents concerning two acquaintances of Wood, Salvador Martinez and Edward Dean Barton, be unsealed, as both men had been considered as alternative suspects in the killings. The trial judge denied this appeal in 2022, and the ruling was upheld by the Texas Court of Criminal Appeals.

Following the denial of the post-conviction appeal, a new execution date was scheduled for March 13, 2025 by the 171st District Court of El Paso County, to be carried out in the Huntsville Unit death chamber. On March 11, however, his execution was stayed by the Court of Criminal Appeals with a 6–2 majority after a last-minute appeal by Wood's legal team. On July 30, the justices returned Wood's case to the trial court and ordered it to review his claims of innocence and ineffective representation. The court did not provide a reason for its decision. Retired Texas judge Dick Alcalá was appointed to hear Wood's appeal.

As of September 2026, Wood remained on death row at the Allan B. Polunsky Unit in West Livingston. On 4 September 2026, a judge granted his request for additional DNA testing of evidence from the 1987 killings, potentially involving around 90 items that may contain biological material.

== Psychology ==
Dr. Thomas Allen diagnosed Wood as having antisocial personality disorder, describing him as “self-motivated [and] manipulative” and stating that “[The fact] that [Wood] volunteered to be questioned by the police is indicative of his arrogance, narcissism, and antisocial personality.” He further stated that “[Wood’s] social and interpersonal skills are impaired by his antisocial personality disorder and aggression.”

== In the media and culture ==
Wood's murders were covered on an episode of the Oxygen true crime series Mark of a Killer, titled "Deaths in the Desert". The case was also featured on an episode of On the Case with Paula Zahn.

The case and David Wood's attempts to stay his execution are the subject of a five-part podcast entitled The Last 12 Weeks which was made in collaboration between The Marshall Project, the New York Times and Serial Productions.

== See also ==
- Capital punishment in Texas
- Capital punishment in the United States
- List of death row inmates in the United States § Texas
- List of serial killers in the United States
