= Eric Jack =

American football player (born 1972)

No. 39
- Position: Cornerback

Personal information
- Born: April 19, 1972 (age 54); Dallas, Texas, U.S.
- Listed height: 5 ft 10 in (1.78 m)
- Listed weight: 177 lb (80 kg)

Career information
- High school: Eastwood
- College: New Mexico
- NFL draft: 1994: undrafted

Career history
- Atlanta Falcons (1994–1995)

Awards and highlights
- First-team All-WAC (1993)

Career NFL statistics
- Tackles: 10
- Fumble recoveries: 1
- Touchdowns: 1
- Stats at Pro Football Reference

Eric Desmond Jack (born April 19, 1972) is an American former professional football player who was a cornerback for one season in the National Football League (NFL). He played college football for the New Mexico Lobos.

== Professional career ==
Jack signed with the Atlanta Falcons as an undrafted free agent following the 1994 NFL draft. He saw action in all 16 games, making 10 tackles and returning one fumble for a touchdown.

On July 22, 1995, Jack was placed on injured reserve. Jack was eventually released by the Falcons, and did not appear in a game during the 1995 season.

=== NFL statistics ===
==== Regular season ====
Season		Games		Tackles				Interceptions						Fumbles	
Year	Team	GP	GS	Comb	Total	Ast	Sack	PD	Int	Yds	Avg	Lng	TD	FF	FR
1994	ATL	16	0	10	8	2	0.0	0	0	0	0.0	0	0	0	1
Career		16	0	10	8	2	0.0	0	0	0	0.0	0	0	0	1
