= Riverside High School (El Paso, Texas) =

Public school in Texas, United States

Location
- 301 Midway Drive; El Paso, Texas 79915; United States; 31°44′0″N 106°22′19″W

Information
- Type: Public
- Motto: The Pride of the Lower Valley
- Established: 1969
- School district: Ysleta ISD
- Principal: Victor Lara
- Faculty: 70.36 (on an FTE basis)
- Grades: 9 to 12
- Enrollment: 1,001 (2022–23)
- Student to teacher ratio: 14.23
- Colors: Burnt orange, white, and navy
- Athletics conference: 4A-D1
- Mascot: Ranger
- Nickname: Rangers
- Website: www.yisd.net/riversidehigh

Riverside High School is a public high school in El Paso, Texas.

== History ==
Riverside High School in El Paso, Texas opened its doors in 1969. It is a traditional four-year high school and a part of the Ysleta Independent School District. The school sits in El Paso's Lower Valley only a few hundred yards from the Rio Grande and Mexico. In 2006, the Texas Education Agency (TEA) rated the school as "Academically Acceptable." Due to its location within El Paso, Riverside has historically had an overwhelmingly predominant Hispanic population. TEA lists it at 97 percent (with 3 percent white and less than 1 percent African American).

Riverside has long been recognized for its academics. In the early 1990s, Riverside sent more Hispanics to Ivy League colleges than any other public high school in the country. Riverside is one of few high schools in El Paso to achieve the recognized rating from the Texas Education Agency. Also, the school has never failed to meet the Adequate Yearly Progress outlined by the No Child Left Behind Act of 2001. Riverside previously housed the Ysleta district's technology magnet program. It currently houses the Socratic Institute for teachers interested in pedagogy as well as the Academy for Sciences and Technology.

In 1993, Chicano activist César Chávez visited the school to talk about his then boycott on grapes to protest the use of pesticides in the fields where poor, Hispanic farm workers labored. He told students the pesticides were affecting the health of the farm workers and their families. Chávez died months after his visit. Nearby César Chávez Academy is named in his honor.

For years, the Riverside campus remained unchanged. In the mid-1980s, the school received a new library and classroom wing. In the early 1990s, the facade of the school was drastically changed and a theater was added. Riverside is currently undergoing heavy renovations that include the construction of a field house for athletic teams and a new fine arts wing for music and theater instruction.

== Notable alumni ==
- Shawn Jordan - professional mixed martial artist, formerly competing in the UFC's Heavyweight Division
- Susana Martinez - 31st Governor of New Mexico.

== Feeder schools ==
- Riverside Middle "Rebels”
- Ramona Elementary "Rams"
- Thomas Manor Elementary "Wranglers”
- Riverside Elementary “Cowboys”

César Chávez Academy and Tejas School of Choice (at old Riverside Elementary) are in the Riverside area. They are both alternative education schools that serve students throughout the Ysleta Independent School District.
