= Jim Price (linebacker) =

American football player (1940–2012)

No. 67, 56
- Position: Linebacker

Personal information
- Born: September 17, 1940; Nettleton, Mississippi, U.S.
- Died: August 10, 2012 (aged 71); Leicester, North Carolina, U.S.
- Listed height: 6 ft 2 in (1.88 m)
- Listed weight: 228 lb (103 kg)

Career information
- High school: Ysleta (El Paso, Texas)
- College: Auburn
- NFL draft: 1963: 3rd round, 34th overall pick
- AFL draft: 1963: 6th round, 43rd overall pick

Career history
- Dallas Cowboys (1963)*; New York Jets (1963); Denver Broncos (1964)
- * Offseason or practice squad member only

Awards and highlights
- Third-team All-SEC (1962)

Career AFL statistics
- Interceptions: 1
- Stats at Pro Football Reference

James Bluford Price (September 17, 1940 – August 10, 2012) was an American professional football linebacker in the American Football League (AFL) for the New York Jets and Denver Broncos. He was selected by the Dallas Cowboys in the 3rd round (34th overall) of the 1963 NFL draft. He played college football at Auburn University.

== Early life ==
Price attended Ysleta High School, where he was a two-way player. He accepted a football scholarship from Auburn University, where he was a three-year starter at center and linebacker.

As a sophomore, he was named the starter, replacing graduated All-American Jackie Burkett, but suffered a dislocated right shoulder and missed 3 games before returning to play against Georgia Tech. In 1962, he was named third-team All-SEC as a center.

== Professional career ==
=== Dallas Cowboys ===
Price was selected by the Dallas Cowboys in the third round (34th overall) of the 1963 NFL draft and by the New York Jets in the sixth round (43rd overall) of the 1963 AFL draft.

He signed with the Cowboys, but his play during training camp was disappointing and was released before the season started in September.

=== New York Jets ===
On September 5, 1963, he signed as a free agent with the New York Jets (at the time the New York Titans) and became a starter. On January 1, 1964, he was part of the largest trade ever made in the American Football League, when he was sent along with Dick Guesman, Ed Cooke, Charlie Janerette and Sid Fournet, to the Denver Broncos, in exchange for Gene Prebola, Wahoo McDaniel, Gordy Holz and Bob Zeman.

=== Denver Broncos ===
In 1964, the Denver Broncos played him as a linebacker and offensive lineman. He suffered a knee injury in the fourth game against the Boston Patriots and was lost for the year.
