= Ara Celi =

American actress

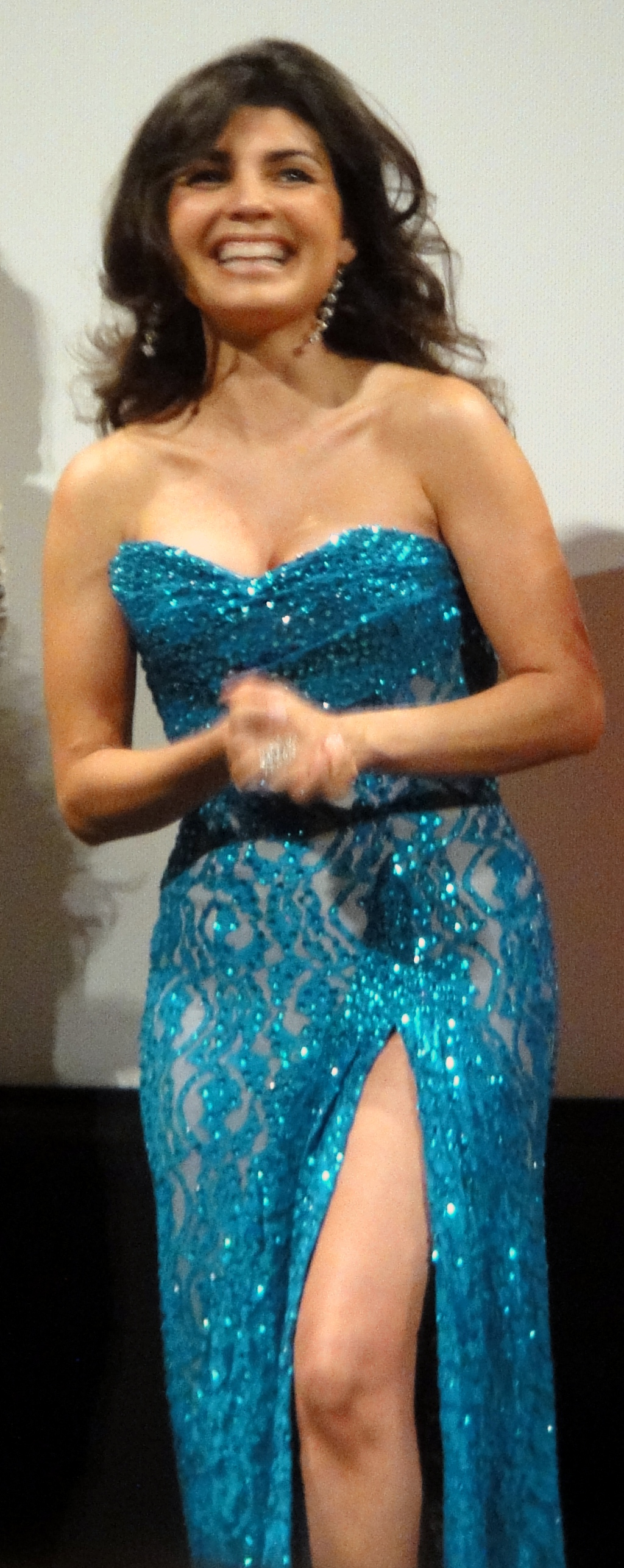
- Ara Celi in 2010
- Born: Araceli Valdez; May 31, 1974 (age 51); El Paso, Texas, U.S.
- Occupation: Actress
- Years active: 1993–present
- Spouse: Robert Godines
- Children: 2

Ara Celi (born May 31, 1974) is an American actress active in American film and television. She had a starring role in the minor 1997 dance movie Looking for Lola, but she is probably best known for her guest starring role as Inca Princess a.k.a. Ampata Gutierrez in season two of Buffy the Vampire Slayer, "Inca Mummy Girl". She is now most often seen in television advertisements for Universal Toyota car dealership in San Antonio, Texas, Charles Maund Toyota dealership in Austin, Texas, Boggus Ford dealership in McAllen, Texas, and Jim Norton T-Town Chevrolet in Tulsa, Oklahoma.

== Early life ==
Celi, a Mexican-American, was born Araceli Valdez in El Paso, Texas, one of six children. She attended J. M. Hanks High School, graduating in 1992. While at Hanks, she appeared in student productions of Splendor in the Grass, Crimes of the Heart, and The Wiz. She later attended the University of Texas at El Paso. While there, she entered and won the GuyRex Mrs. Texas Pageant (1994), later becoming a semifinalist in The GuyRex Miss World USA pageant (also 1994).

== Film career ==
At age 18, she moved to Mexico, where she had a role on a Spanish language soap opera. After three months she decided to move to Los Angeles, where she landed a guest appearance on Saved by the Bell: The College Years. She made several other guest appearances in television series, including The Brothers García, Nip/Tuck and Buffy the Vampire Slayer.

In 1999, she played Raquel Dion Santos in a nine-month attachment to All My Children. She was also in Bruce Almighty, American Beauty and From Dusk Till Dawn 3: The Hangman's Daughter, playing Esmeralda/ Santanico Pandemonium. She acted in the 2000 independent feature film Go Fish, directed by Lawrence L. Simeone. She has also provided her voice as Katarina DeLeon in Pirates: The Legend of Black Kat. She played a reporter in Robert Rodriguez's film Machete (2010).

== Personal life ==
In 2000, she married Robert Godines, a financial advisor, and in 2006 they moved to the Texas Hill Country near San Antonio to start a family. They have two children, a boy and a girl. Celi is a spokesperson for a local automotive dealership, and she and her husband own a barbering franchise in San Antonio.
