= Alicia R. Chacón International School =

- Escuela Internacional Alicia R. Chacón
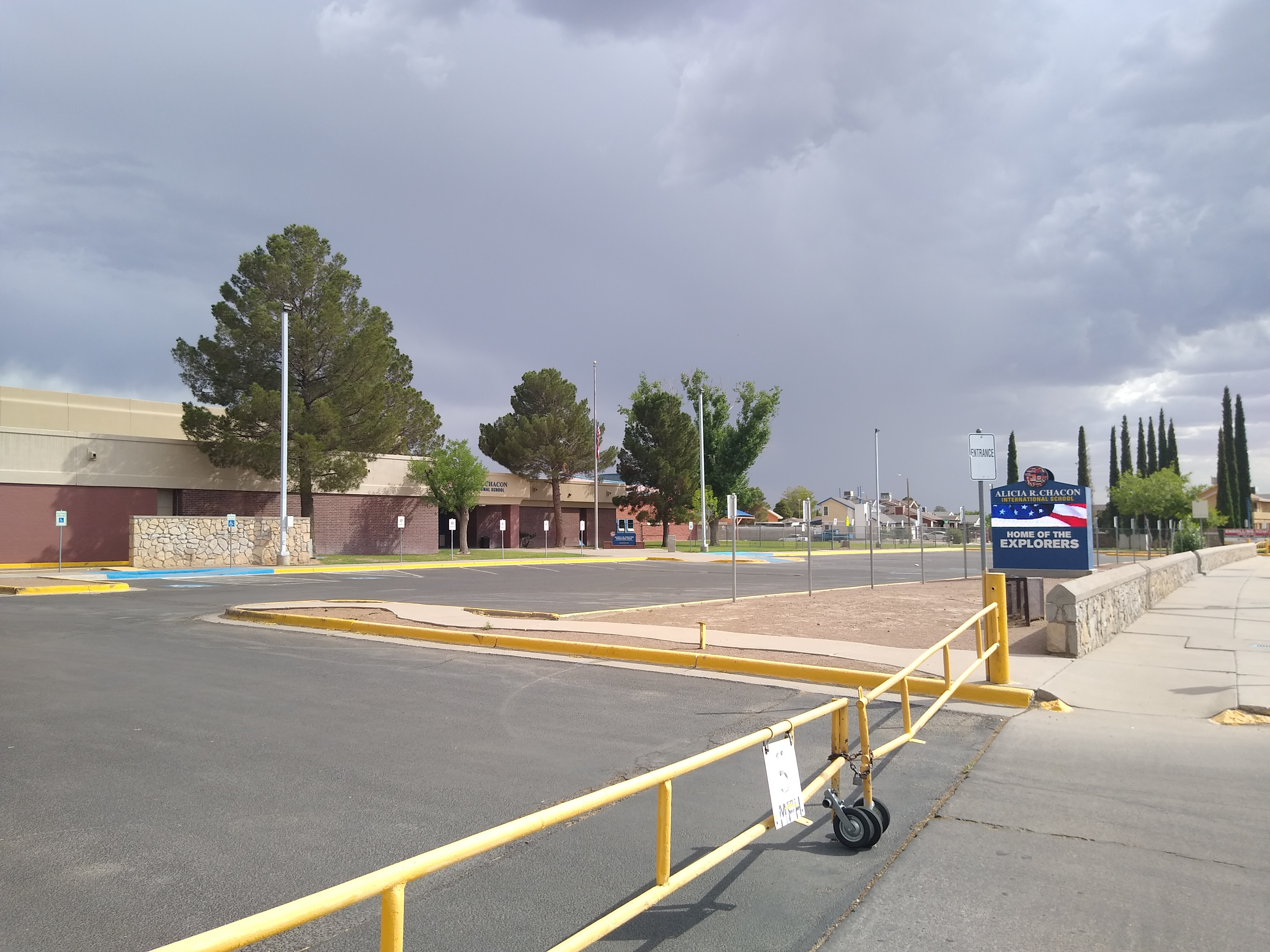

Location
- 920 Burgundy drive El Paso, Texas 79907; United States; 31.705087°N 106.348571°W

Information
- Type: Public school
- Principal: Candice Power
- Faculty: 48
- Grades: K–8
- Enrollment: 792 (2014–2015)
- Website: www.yisd.net/aliciarchacon

Alicia R. Chacón International School (Spanish: Escuela Internacional Alicia R. Chacón) is a K–8 school in El Paso, Texas. It is operated by the Ysleta Independent School District.

Chacón has a two-way bilingual education program that is intended to teach Spanish-speaking students English and English-speaking students Spanish. Students may also take a third language; available third languages are Chinese, German, Japanese, French, and Russian. The bilingual education program was developed to encourage speakers of one language to retain their language and to also learn a second language at the same time. This differs from other bilingual programs in Texas, where non-English speaking students are expected to learn solely in English once they achieve a certain competency in English. As of 2009 Chacón has long waiting lists of students. Nate Blakeslee of Texas Monthly argued that other Texas school districts should use Chacón's bilingual program.

== History ==
The school, which opened in 1995, was named after Mexican American politician and judge Alicia R. Chacón. Its two-way bilingual program for kindergarten through grade 3 opened that year as part of the U.S. Department of Education-funded Project Mariposa ("Mariposa" means butterfly), an effort between different school districts. Each following year an additional grade level with bilingual education was established; in 2000 the school's first eighth-grade class graduated.

In 1995 the school had 352 available spaces for students. By June 25, 1995, 234 places were taken.

== Curriculum ==
Students are expected to gain a high level of literacy in Spanish. As of 2009 early grades course content is primarily taught in Spanish, but in later grades English becomes the predominant language of instruction.

Mandarin Chinese, German, Japanese, French and Russian were to be offered in the coursework from the school's beginning.

== Student body ==
As of 2001 95% of the students are Hispanic and Latino, and the remainder belong to other ethnicities.
