= Inca Mummy Girl =

- Buffy the Vampire Slayer episode
- Episode no.: Season 2 Episode 4
- Directed by: Ellen S. Pressman
- Written by: Matt Kiene; Joe Reinkemeyer
- Production code: 5V04
- Original air date: October 6, 1997

Guest appearances
- Kristine Sutherland as Joyce Summers; Ara Celi as Ampata Gutierrez / Inca Princess; Seth Green as Oz; Jason Hall as Devon MacLeish; Henrik Rosvall as Sven; Gil Birmingham as Peru guard; Danny Strong as Jonathan Levinson

Episode chronology
← Previous "School Hard"	Next → "Reptile Boy"
- Buffy the Vampire Slayer season 2

"Inca Mummy Girl" is episode four of season two of the television series Buffy the Vampire Slayer, originally airing on The WB on October 6, 1997. The episode was written by former series story editors Matt Kiene and Joe Reinkemeyer (penning their second and final script for the show) and directed by Ellen S. Pressman.

Buffy and Giles are suspicious of Ampata, a Peruvian exchange student staying at Buffy's house, when a fellow student goes missing during a school field trip to the Natural History Museum and a broken Peruvian pictogram-cover plate is found in his place. Meanwhile, after Xander falls head over heels for Ampata, he faces certain death when his love interest is revealed to be an ancient mummy who must kill to stay alive.

== Plot ==
To prepare for Sunnydale High's cultural exchange program, Buffy visits an Incan exhibit with her schoolmates. She is paired with an exchange student with whom her mom signed her up. Xander becomes jealous when he learns that she will room with a guy.

The students learn that the mummy in the museum is one of a beautiful Incan princess, sacrificed by her people to save them from destruction. Willow and Buffy express remorse for the princess; dying before she could really live her life. After everyone leaves the museum, a class clown breaks the seal on the mummy while trying to steal it. The princess wakes up, for the curse is broken, and pulls the student into her coffin. She mummifies him by a kiss on the lips. When the Scoobies rush to the museum, cracking uneasy jokes, they encounter a sword-wielding guard and the remains of the missing student.

Buffy's exchange student arrives at the bus station, but the mummy girl sucks out his life too. The 500-year-old becomes a beautiful teenager, and poses as "Ampata", the boy who was supposed to stay with Buffy (everyone simply assumes that the information was wrong on her gender). Xander is smitten with her, and the two begin a relationship.

Giles asks Ampata to decipher the seal from her tomb, and she reluctantly explains that it describes a girl chosen to die to save her people, and a bodyguard who will keep her from straying from that path. She also tells Giles to destroy the seal completely. The bodyguard appears again and again, trying to stop Ampata, until she finally manages to use her kiss on him in the bathroom, sucking out his life to keep herself from dying.

Buffy and Ampata bond over the tale of the Inca Princess, Ampata stating that the princess was forced into her destiny by her people, as they claimed she was the only girl of her generation who could save them; Buffy miserably notes that this parallels her own life. Xander asks Ampata to the dance to enliven her; she gladly accepts. Willow is downcast to see her crush with another girl. Students dress up in "cultural" outfits. The band playing at the dance is Dingoes Ate My Baby, and the lead guitarist, Oz, notices Willow in her parka.

Meanwhile, Buffy and Giles open Ampata's trunk and discover the real Ampata's body. Giles tries to piece together the seal while Buffy tries to save Xander from Ampata's deadly kiss. But Ampata feels too much for Xander and leaves for the museum. She tries to stop Giles from reconstructing the seal. Buffy shows up to fight her but is tossed into Ampata's sarcophagus alongside Giles. When Ampata tries to feed off Willow, Xander shows up and insists that if she must feed on anyone to save her life, it should be him; despite Ampata's feelings for him, she reluctantly agrees to do so. However, Ampata hesitates and weakens to the point of returning to her dead form; Buffy pulls her off Xander and she instantly breaks into pieces on the floor.

At school the next day, Buffy consoles Xander and tells him about the parallels between her and Ampata's lives and how they were both chosen to die. She then thanks him for saving her from that fate.

== Continuity ==
Vox notes, "There’s the introduction of Oz, and Jonathan's first appearance on the series proper after he showed up in the unaired pilot."

Xander asks Ampata, "You're not a praying mantis, are you?" in reference to Xander's crush in "Teacher's Pet."

== Cultural references ==
The Inca Princess in this episode was inspired by the story of Mummy Juanita, a real mummy discovered on the extinct volcano Ampato near Arequipa, Peru, in 1995.

Xander's costume for the exchange student dance references the Man with No Name, the character Clint Eastwood plays in The Dollars Trilogy.

Oz mentions the theme from A Summer's Place.

== Reception ==
"Inca Mummy Girl" had an audience of 3.2 million households.

In 2023, Rolling Stone ranked this episode as #133 out of the 144 episodes in honor of 20th anniversary of the show's ending, calling it "forgettable." Vox ranked it as #140 out of the 144, saying that "it did take a while for season two to outgrow season one's reliance on fun-but-dumb monsters of the week," and this is "one of the dumbest and the least fun."

Reviewer Mike Loschiavo applauded "the gruesomeness of the episode... It explored a horror trope with compassion. ... this was about a creature that struggled with killing," and "we find out that she was a chosen one herself."

"Inca Mummy Girl" was ranked at #126 on Paste Magazine's "Every Episode Ranked" list and #128 on BuzzFeed's "Ranking Every Episode Of Buffy The Vampire Slayer" list.

InsectReflection.com discusses the similarities between two Chosen Ones, specifically with Buffy's choice to sacrifice herself for the sake of others in "Prophecy Girl", while Ampata chooses to live and make others pay that price:

In both cases, a Slayer is told by their Watcher that they must die. The difference lies in how Ampata and Buffy react to that. ... While Xander's kiss revitalises Buffy and fills her with new strength, Ampata's kiss drains others of their life force. ... In a way, she could be seen as a more weak-willed version of Angel in "Amends" – who is prepared to sacrifice her love, to lose herself and her humanity in the embrace. Ampata is in fact doing double-shifts in the metaphor here – she is Buffy of course, but she is also Angel, the undead creature threatening to consume her Heart.

IsPrettyAwesome.com observes that the Mummy Girl's "real name is never revealed" and wrote similar sentiments:

She was an innocent girl chosen for an unpleasant fate, and now she is willing to sacrifice people in order to experience some of the joys she missed before. Her powers are classic Bathory – draining the life from other people to maintain her own youth! It's really just vampirism in a slightly different form... The show is savvy enough to complicate this metaphor, because the people who sacrificed the Inca Mummy Girl were indeed monstrously unfair, and submitting to her fate will indeed ruin her life. So the show cleverly has its cake and eats it too – it criticises that selfishness while also agreeing that teenagers can be right about stuff.

Here, the comparison is with Ampata and Xander, rather than with Ampata and Angel: "The climax brings Xander's and IMG's respective selfishnesses into collision. Xander is the one who demands the Inca Mummy Girl leave Willow alone – if she's going to murder anyone, it's got to be him. It's his turn to step up to his responsibilities, the same test that Buffy passed, and that Inca Mummy Girl failed."

An essay on Willow's costumes and dress in Buffy discusses the "themes of identity, costume, and duality" in "Inca Mummy Girl" and the later episode "Halloween". Oz notices her for the first two times when she is costumed - here, in "her adorable but slightly cultural appropriate-y "Inuit" costume," and at Halloween in "the full-body ghost costume and the 'generically sexy' costume. Both are very much performances in their own way."
