= Lamberto Alvarez =

American artist

Lamberto™
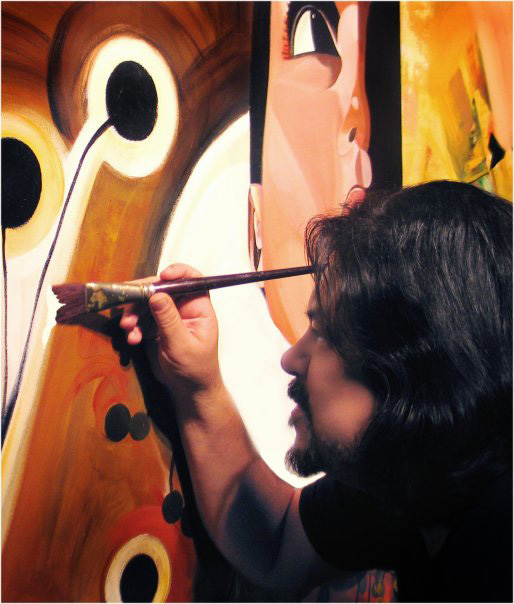
- Lamberto works on a large-scale painting titled "Arielle."
- Born: Lamberto Alvarez Jr. March 21, 1953; El Paso, Texas
- Known for: Painting, Drawing, Sculpture, Printmaking, Illustration, Design, Logos, Photographer and Musician
- Spouse: Elizabeth Cruce Alvarez (m. 1987)
- Website: http://www.lamberto.com/

Lamberto Alvarez (born March 21, 1953) is an American painter, sculptor, photographer, musician and author of Mexican-American descent living in Texas. "Lamberto" is his registered trademark. He was one of three Latinos chosen by the Walt Disney Company in 2004 to create a life-size statue to commemorate the 75th anniversary of Mickey Mouse.

He was also a contributor to the San Jose Mercury News's 1985 Pulitzer Prize-winning investigative series of articles "The Hidden Billions" about massive corruption in the government of Philippine President Ferdinand Marcos and his hidden wealth in the United States and abroad.

== Early life ==
Lamberto was born in El Paso, Texas, to Lamberto Alvarez Sr. and Ana Espino. Although a native-born American who claims El Paso as his hometown, Lamberto spent his earliest years in neighboring Ciudad Juárez, Mexico, his mother's hometown. Divided by the customs bridges, Lamberto Sr. commuted for several years from Juarez to work for an American construction company as a cement finisher. Although it was not common for American citizens to live in Mexico when they could legally live in the United States, Ana's bond with her own parents was strong, and it provided the foundation for Lamberto's study and knowledge of the Spanish language.

In his early grades, Lamberto attended Escuela Narcisa Primero, a strict yet creative private school in Juarez, which catered to gifted students and instilled in him both discipline and a love of the arts. Young Lamberto became a distinguished student in the arts, math and science, and became fluent in Spanish. At age 6, he also discovered the magic of art from his parents, who both possessed a gift for drawing. They would spend weekend evenings entertaining their children by drawing and scribbling around the kitchen table.

At age 11, his family moved to El Paso, where his teachers noticed his gift for math and art. He attended Southloop Elementary School, a predominantly Latino school, and quickly became fluent in English. With encouragement from his mother and his friends, Lamberto learned to play the guitar and formed a band called "The Finks". He also learned to play the bass guitar and the drums, and continued to play in bands for much of his adult life.

== Education ==
Lamberto graduated from Ysleta High School in 1972, where he was an active art student, participating in many art projects and contests.

Lamberto attended the University of Texas at El Paso, studying fine art and photography. During college, he was heavily influenced by surrealist artist Salvador Dalí, which is revealed in some of his early oil paintings. Diego Rivera, Picasso and Jackson Pollock also influenced his later, more mature body of work.

== Career ==
In 1975, during his junior year of college, Lamberto was hired by the El Paso Times as an artist and photographer. Lamberto worked at the Times for several years, producing artwork for all sections of the newspaper. The body of artwork he established at the Times was integral in his being hired by San Jose Mercury News in San Jose, California. After five years with The Mercury News, Lamberto became an art director at the Fort Worth Star-Telegram and later at The Dallas Morning News.

During his time in Fort Worth, Lamberto began to broaden the scope of his artwork to include children's books, national magazines and college textbooks. In 2004, he made the leap from publications to fine art and now works as a painter of figurative and abstract fine art, and creator of stained concrete art, assemblage art and three-dimensional sculptures.

Lamberto and his artist son, Beto Alvarez, collaborated on creating illustrations for a children's book entitled Muffler Man, or El Hombre Mofle, published by Arte Publico Press of the University of Houston. Both father and son worked together for several years at The Dallas Morning News, Lamberto as Director of Illustration and Beto as a news illustrator.

Both father and son also were accepted in an international show sponsored by Nordstrom entitled "El Amor Ahora", ("Love Now"), a celebration of National Hispanic Heritage Month. They were invited to participate in the annual show from 2004–2006.

Lamberto also illustrated another children's book for Arte Publico, Dancing Miranda, or Baila Miranda, Baila.

In addition to his work with newspapers, Lamberto's artwork has been published by Time magazine, Harcourt Brace College Publishers, The Boston Globe, Los Angeles Times, Scholastic Books, Arte Publico Press, among many others.

With author Michael H. Price, Lamberto contributed to a self-published novel entitled "Muñeca: An Anthology of Crime Stories".

Lamberto, who owns a fine art studio, Lamberto Art and Design, has received attention from the media for his innovative acid-stain concrete art (www.acidstainconcreteart.com). These concrete creations are an outgrowth of the work he created in scratchboard in the early 1990s, marked with Lamberto's distinctive style of using motion, color and bold strokes. Lamberto explores many art forms, including assemblage artwork, sculpture, music, photography, literature, songwriting and design.

Lamberto's publishing company is Solare Media, which publishes inspirational schoolbook covers for children in need of positive role models. The Shining Star Heroes book cover series depicts heroes from all walks of life who are encouraging examples for children to follow.

In 2006, Lamberto was involved in a year-long event to celebrate the 50th anniversary of Southlake, Texas, the city in which he currently resides. He designed and painted three longhorn statues, with the help of his wife, Elizabeth, and daughter, Veronica, to represent the sponsors that selected him to paint their longhorns: Verizon, Sabre Holdings and Aeristo.

== Accomplishments ==
During his time working in the newspaper industry, Lamberto received many illustration and design awards, most notably from the Society for News Design (SND), the Associated Press, Print Regional Design Annual, the Headliners and the Associated Press Managing Editors. Lamberto also was a contributor to a 1985 Pulitzer Prize–winning investigative article "The Hidden Billions", about Ferdinand and Imelda Marcos of the Philippines, which was published while he was working for The San Jose Mercury News.

Lamberto came into the national spotlight as a personality when he was involved in the Walt Disney Company's 75th anniversary celebration of Mickey Mouse — the "75 InspEARations" celebration. He was invited to create a life-size statue of Mickey Mouse in his own style, which he called "El Mickey". Lamberto was one of 75 celebrities, and one of only three Latinos, involved in the project. Lamberto's "El Mickey", number 66, represented the Dallas/Fort Worth-based Disney Radio station. The 75 statues were exhibited throughout the United States for one year and are on permanent public display at Disneyland in California. Although the statues reside at Disneyland, they were auctioned at Sotheby's in New York to raise money for a variety of charities; proceeds from the sale of "El Mickey" benefited the "Make-A-Wish Foundation." Mickey Mouse, as a pop culture icon, was visited by millions. Other celebrities participating in this event included John Travolta, Ben Affleck, Elton John, Kelly Ripa, Tom Hanks, George Lopez, Shaquille O'Neal, Jamie Lee Curtis and Andy García.
