= Justin Maese =

American baseball pitcher (born 1996)

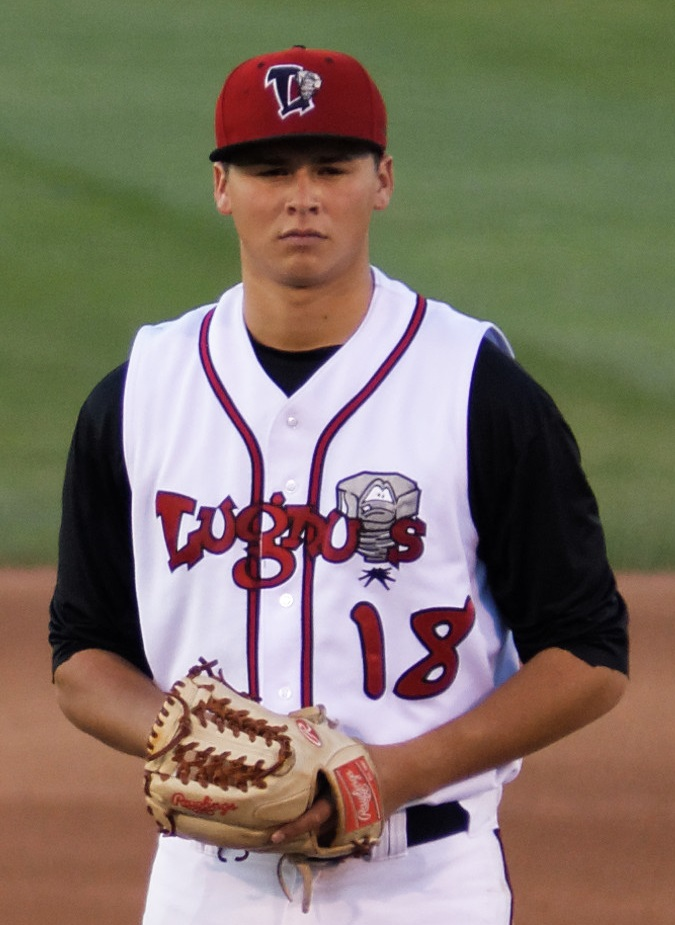
- Maese with the Lansing Lugnuts in 2016
- Pitcher
- Born: October 24, 1996 (age 29); El Paso, Texas, U.S.
- Bats: Right Throws: Right
- Stats at Baseball Reference

Justin Alex Maese (born October 24, 1996) is an American former professional baseball pitcher. He was drafted by the Toronto Blue Jays in the 3rd round of the 2015 Major League Baseball draft, but never played in the majors after playing parts of seven minor league seasons.

== Career ==
Maese attended Ysleta High School, where he excelled in both baseball and football, and later had his jersey in both sports retired by the school. In his senior season, Maese, who played quarterback, led Ysleta to a 7–4 record by throwing for 5,328 yards and 38 touchdowns. He was scouted by several nearby colleges, and ultimately signed a letter of intent to play baseball for Texas Tech University.

=== Toronto Blue Jays ===
Maese was drafted by the Toronto Blue Jays in the third round of the 2015 Major League Baseball draft, and signed with the team for a $300,000 bonus. Maese was assigned to the Rookie-level Gulf Coast League Blue Jays for the 2015 season. In 35 2/3 total innings over 8 pitching appearances, he would post a 5–0 win–loss record, 1.01 earned run average (ERA), and 19 strikeouts. Maese began the 2016 season with the Low-A Vancouver Canadians of the Northwest League, and was the team's Opening Day starter. He would pitch five innings in a 5–3 win over the Spokane Indians, yielding only one run on two hits, with six strikeouts and no walks. In July, Maese was promoted to the Single-A Lansing Lugnuts. Maese pitched to a 4–6 record in 15 total starts in 2016, with a 2.94 ERA and 64 strikeouts in 82 2/3 innings. Maese began the 2017 season with Lansing. On June 7, he was named a Midwest League All-Star. Maese made 15 starts in 2017, and went 5–3 with a 4.86 ERA and 69 strikeouts in 79 2/3 innings.

Maese missed the entire 2018 season after undergoing surgery to address a shoulder impingement, and made only 3 appearances for the Gulf Coast Blue Jays in 2019. Maese did not play in a game in 2020 due to the cancellation of the minor league season because of the COVID-19 pandemic. In 2021, he made 33 appearances for the High-A Vancouver Canadians, posting a 4.75 ERA with 63 strikeouts in 53 innings pitched. He elected minor league free agency following the season on November 7, 2021.

=== Atlanta Braves ===
On January 13, 2022, Maese signed a minor league contract with the Atlanta Braves organization. He was assigned to the Double-A Mississippi Braves to begin the season. Appearing in 50 games for Mississippi, Maese worked to a 2-6 record and 4.70 ERA with 69 strikeouts and 11 saves in 53 2/3 innings pitched. He elected free agency following the season on November 10.

=== New York Yankees ===
On February 8, 2023, Maese signed a minor league contract with the New York Yankees organization. Pitching in 14 games for the Double-A Somerset Patriots, he struggled to a 7.04 ERA with 26 strikeouts in 23 innings pitched. Maese was released by the Yankees on May 30.

=== Toros de Tijuana ===
On June 30, 2023, Maese signed with the Toros de Tijuana of the Mexican League. He appeared in only 3 games for Tijuana, recording a 3.86 ERA with two strikeouts across 2 1/3 innings pitched.

On February 14, 2024, Maese retired from professional baseball.
