= Pedro Reneros de Posada =

Spanish army general

28rd Spanish Governor of New Mexico
- In office 1686 – 1689 (in name only)
- Preceded by: Domingo Gironza Petriz Cruzate
- Succeeded by: Domingo Gironza Petriz Cruzate

Personal details
- Born: Unknown
- Died: Unknown

Pedro Reneros de Posada was a general who served as interim governor of Santa Fe de Nuevo Mexico in 1686–1689, during the Pueblo Amerindian revolt, as well as leader of the Presidio of El Paso.

== Military career ==
Posada joined the Spanish Army when he was young, reaching the rank of General. Posada, for some time, served the Presidio of the city of El Paso, a region that belonged to Santa Fe de Nuevo Mexico until the incorporation of the province to the United States in the 19th century. After retiring from office, he lived in Mexico City and reportedly had dealings with important figures in Spanish politics.

== Administration of New Mexico ==
Later, in February 1686, Posada was appointed governor of New Mexico and began serving in that capacity in the fall of that year. In this year, Posada had to faced to several Amerindian tribes that had rebelled against the Spaniards in the West El Paso: Sumas, Mansos, Jocomes and Janos.

In 1687 Posada passed a law prohibiting the sale of horses by New Mexico soldiers. In addition, he led a troop against one of the groups of the Santa Ana Amerindian tribe in the summer of that year, particularly against those who resided in La Mesa, New Mexico. The war ended with Posada's victory and the Santa Ana people was captured and sentenced.

In 1688 Posada led a troop to northern New Mexico in search of the Pueblo Amerindians, who had rebelled against the Spaniards, in order to repress them. The troop arrived in the region of Sia (also known as Cia). However, his expedition was a failure and Posada was only able to catch a few horses and sheep. He also led an expedition to the territory of the Queres Amerindian tribe.

His administration was considered negative by the Viceroy of New Spain for not having achieved its objectives. In addition, he was accused by the soldiers of the presidio El Paso of not having paid their salaries during his administration. This complaint brought him to trial. For all these reasons, he was dismissed from his political post in 1689 and was replaced by Domingo Gironza Petriz Cruzate, who had already governed Santa Fe de Nuevo Mexico previously.
