= Domingo Jironza Petriz de Cruzate =

Spanish soldier (c.1640–??)

Domingo Jironza Pétriz de Cruzate

27th and 29th Spanish Governor of New Mexico
- In office 1683 – 1686 (in name only)
- Preceded by: Antonio de Otermin
- Succeeded by: Pedro Reneros de Posada
- In office 1689 – 1691 (in name only)
- Preceded by: Pedro Reneros de Posada
- Succeeded by: Diego de Vargas

Personal details
- Born: 1640 Huesca, Aragon, Spain
- Died: Unknown

Domingo Jironza Pétriz de Cruzate (or Domingo Gironza) (born c. 1640) was a Spanish soldier who was Governor of New Mexico from 1683 to 1686, and again from 1689 to 1691. The independent Pueblo republic ruled most of what had been Santa Fe de Nuevo México north of El Paso del Norte after the 1680 Pueblo Revolt. With limited resources, he was unable to reconquer the Pueblo peoples.

== Early career ==
Domingo Jironza Pétriz de Cruzate was born around 1640 in the province of Huesca in Aragon, Spain. Possibly he was the Domingo Xironza who married Sebastiana de Oquendo in Mexico City on 30 April 1663. If so, he was the son of Antonio Xironza and Ana Mangues Pérez. He joined the Spanish armed forces and served in the wars between Spain and Portugal. On 10 April 1680 Jironza sailed from Cadiz as Captain in command of fifty soldiers, bound for New Spain. On his arrival the viceroy, Payo Enríquez de Rivera, made him mayor of Metztitlán, an office that he held until 1682.

== New Mexico governor ==
The Spanish were driven out of New Mexico in 1680 after the Pueblo Revolt. In 1683 Jironza was appointed Captain General and Governor of the New Mexico frontier, with the mandate of fighting the Apaches and attempting to re-conquer the territory. His headquarters were at El Paso del Norte.

On 15 October 1683 a party of seven Jumano Indians from La Junta de los Ríos, at the junction of the Rio Conchos and Rio Grande near modern-day Presidio, Texas, came to El Paso, asking for the Spanish to send missionaries to their country and beyond. Their spokesman, Juan Sabeata, talked of the great wealth of these lands, and those of the great kingdom of Texas that lay beyond. Jironza sent Juan Domínguez de Mendoza, an experienced militia leader, and Fray Nicolás López to explore the Jumano country and establish missions. The expedition left El Paso on 15 December 1683, going down the Rio Grande to La Junta, then on to the Edwards Plateau. They spent six weeks there, building a fort as defense against Apaches near the location of modern San Angelo, Texas, and hunting buffalo for hides and food. They fed and baptized many of the friendly local people who visited their camp. On their return, Domínguez and López made a strong case for sending soldiers and missionaries to the Jumano country. However, Governor Jironza was unable to help since his forces were tied up fighting the Pueblos.

On March 14, 1684, friendly Tiwas and Piros told Jironza of a Manso plot to kill all the Spaniards in El Paso. The Mansos were "tired of everything having to do with God and with the church, which is why they wanted to do what the Indians of New Mexico had done." The Spanish imprisoned the ringleaders of the plot, who included an Apache and a Quivira Indian (probably a Wichita). Ten of them were executed. Later, in November, the Spanish garrison of 60 men plus friendly Indians attacked a gathering of hostile Indians who apparently intended to carry out the plot.

Jironza led an expedition against the Apaches in 1684. He was not given sufficient soldiers to effect the reconquest of New Mexico, because resources were held back due to rumours that the French were conducting an expedition in Texas, and preventing this would be the higher priority. This was the invasion of eastern Texas by René-Robert Cavelier, Sieur de La Salle in 1685.

In 1685 Jironza made an effort to collect the refugees from New Mexico who had disobeyed royal orders and left the El Paso area.

Jironza was temporarily removed from office in 1686 since his activities in the Nueva Vizcaya region had caused conflict with both the church and the civil authorities.

Jironza's successor Pedro Reneros de Posada proved ineffective and Jironza was reinstated in 1688 or 1689. His first action was to march north, where he sacked and burned Zia Pueblo. This was the bloodiest engagement during the Pueblo Revolt, causing the Indians to abandon their settlements and retreat into the mountains. Six hundred Indians were killed, but the Spanish again did not have sufficient resources to follow through, and Jironza was forced to retire to El Paso. On this expedition he was accompanied by seventy Franciscan Friars.

He was planning to make another effort to reconquer New Mexico in 1691, but had to cancel the expedition while he dealt with uprisings by the Suma Indians to the south of El Paso.

He was succeeded as governor that year by Diego de Vargas.

Documents apparently signed by Jironza in 1689 granted land to eleven Pueblos. However, two centuries later these were found to be forgeries.

His successor, Captain General Diego de Vargas Zapata Lujan Ponce de León y Contreras, set out from El Paso around the end of August 1692, and took possession of Santa Fe on 14 September 1692 without having to fight.

== Later career ==
Jironza was made captain of the mobile Presidio de las Fronteras de Sonora force in 1691, operating from various temporary bases on the northern frontier, the last being the mining camp of San Juan Bautista de Sonora which was at the time under the jurisdiction of Nueva Vizcaya, New Spain. He fought against the Apaches, Janos, Jocomes, Upper Pimas, and Sumas. His nephew Juan Mateo Mange left Spain to join his uncle in 1692. He was appointed lieutenant, alcalde mayor and capitan á guerra, and was given the duty of accompanying the missionaries in Sonora and recording their discoveries. These reports provide an excellent source of information on the exploration of northern Sonora.

In 1701 Domingo Jironza Pétriz de Cruzate was replaced as captain by General Jacinto de Fuensaldaña. He remained in San Juan Bautista after his retirement. The last record that mentions him is dated September 1708, when he was mayordomo of the community church.
