= Ysleta Mission =

- U.S. National Register of Historic Places
- Recorded Texas Historic Landmark
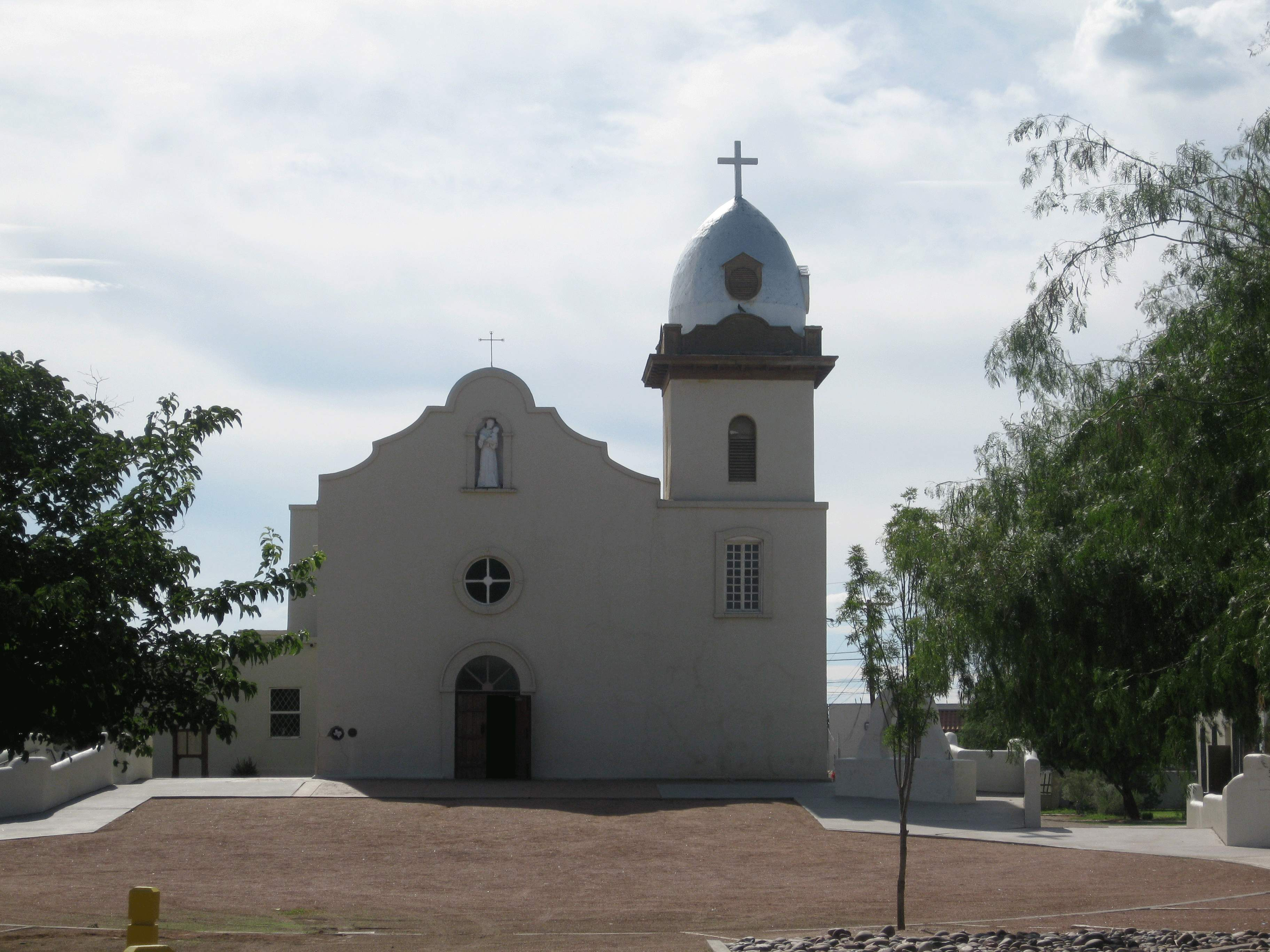
- East side of mission as of July 2009

- Location within Texas Location within the United States
- Location: 131 South Zaragoza Rd, El Paso, Texas
- Coordinates: 31°41′27″N 106°19′38″W
- Area: 2 acres (0.81 ha)
- Built: 1682
- Architectural style: Classical Revival, Late Victorian
- NRHP reference No.: 72001360
- RTHL No.: 15485

Significant dates
- Added to NRHP: July 31, 1972
- Designated RTHL: 1962

The Ysleta Mission, located in the Ysleta del Sur Pueblo within the municipality of El Paso, Texas, is recognized as the oldest continuously operated parish in the State of Texas. The Ysleta community is also recognized as the oldest in Texas and claims to have the oldest continuously cultivated plot of land in the United States.

== Early history ==
In 1680, as a result of the Pueblo Revolt, the Tigua (Tiwa) tribe was forced to flee from their ancestral home, Isleta Pueblo, located south of present-day Albuquerque, New Mexico. Some of the pueblo people fled to Hopi territory in Arizona while others followed Spanish colonists as they retreated southward. The Spanish and their Pueblo allies eventually settled in El Paso del Norte (present day El Paso, TX) where they established the Ysleta del Sur Pueblo and where the Ysleta Mission was founded. The spelling of Ysleta with a "Y" and the term del Sur (south) was to differentiate the new settlement from the mother pueblo, Isleta. In 1682, the Tigua people built a permanent structure out of adobe and, in October of that year, the building was formally dedicated by Bishop Salpointe of Tucson and named La Misión de Corpus Christi de San Antonio de la Ysleta del Sur in honor of the Tigua's patron saint, Saint Anthony (San Antonio).

Over the next two centuries the mission was relocated several times due to flooding of the Rio Grande. In 1829 one such flood washed away the structure. The flood also resulted in the river cutting a new course further south and the area where the church had been located was no longer considered a part of Mexico but of the Republic of Texas. In 1897 the structure was remodeled and the now familiar gables and bee-hive bell tower were added. A fire in 1907, caused by chemicals stored in the bell tower to repel bats, resulted in massive damage to the building. The church was rebuilt in 1908 and remains much the same today. The church prospered and in 1918 Our Lady of Mount Carmel School was established and remained open until 2005 when the church closed it. The Texas Historical Commission erected historical markers at the Ysleta Mission in the following years: 1936 – First mission and pueblo in Texas, 1962 – Site of first mission in Texas, and 1970 – Oldest mission in Texas. On July 31, 1972, the Ysleta Mission was added to the National Register of Historic Places.

== The mission today ==
In 1990 members of the community began efforts to restore and preserve the Ysleta and Socorro missions as well as the Presidio Chapel of San Elizario, Texas. That same year the City and County governments of El Paso formed the Office of Heritage Tourism and received technical support for the project from the National Trust for Historic Preservation in the form of a grant. The newly created Office of Heritage Tourism established a board with representatives from various local governments, the Catholic Diocese, and private organizations who had been working separately on projects to restore the missions. Two Mexican architects with expertise in restoring adobe buildings were retained with the help of a grant from the National Park Service and they developed a comprehensive restoration plan which was the basis upon which Bishop Armando Ochoa began a much publicized fund raising effort to pay for the restorations. The two missions and chapel comprise The El Paso Mission Trail, which stretches approximately 9 miles along Socorro Rd. (FM 258) and is considered to be a part of El Camino Real de Tierra Adentro (The Royal Road to the Interior).

The Tigua people continue to be closely associated with the church and remain loyal to their patron saint, Saint Anthony of Padua. The Tigua feast day of San Antonio is observed on June 13, with a morning mass followed by traditional dancing. Directly adjacent to the church, the Tiguas built a large gaming center called Speaking Rock Casino; however, after a few years the state government of Texas successfully challenged its legality and it was subsequently closed down. It was later reopened but no longer offered casino style gaming. The Tigua Tribal Government offices are located a short distance from the church as is the Tigua Cultural Center.

The church is currently owned by the Catholic Diocese of El Paso and staffed by Conventual Franciscans. For nearly a century, the church has hosted the Ysleta Mission Festival on the second weekend of July. This three-day event is one of El Paso's largest and proceeds from the event help fund the maintenance and preservation of the Ysleta Mission. In the 1960s a newer church building was constructed to accommodate the growing number of parishioners. The old church is now primarily reserved for special occasions such as weddings, quinceañeras, and baptisms. Many handwritten baptismal, marriage, and burial records span centuries, with surviving historical collections ( such as records from 1772 to 1956) archived by groups like family search catalog

== Timeline ==
- 1680 – Spanish settlers and Tigua (Tiwa) Indians are driven from northern New Mexico and Isleta Pueblo by the Pueblo Revolt. They travel southward to El Paso del Norte where El Paso, Texas, and Cd. Juarez, Chihuahua, Mexico exist today. Mexico Governor Antonio de Otermin, representing the crown of Spain, established the Ysleta Mission (Ysleta del Sur Mission) for the refugees.
- 1682 – A permanent structure for the Ysleta Mission was established. In October the building is formally dedicated and named La Misión de Corpus Christi de San Antonio de la Ysleta del Sur in honor of the Tigua's patron saint, Saint Anthony (San Antonio) by the Bishop of Tucson, Arizona.
- 1691 – Governor Diego de Vargas gives the first official land grant for the church to Father Joaquin de Hinojosa.
- 1693 – The church was renamed Corpus Christi de los Tiguas de Ysleta by Governor Diego de Vargas under the authority of King Charles II of Spain.
- 1740s, 1829 – Flooding of the Rio Grande damaged/destroyed the mission.
- 1874 – The first formal property deed for the church was granted to Bishop Salpointe of Tucson. This deed outlined the boundaries of the church's property and remain the same today. French clergy petitioned the Bishop of Tucson to change the church's name to Our Lady of Mount Carmel.
- 1881-1891,1894-1990 – The church was administered by Jesuits from Mexico Province, Mexico City, Mexico.
- 1907 – Fire caused massive damage to the church structure. It was rebuilt the following year.
- 1919–1921 – Sisters of the Immaculate Heart of Mary (México-Cuba Province, El Paso, Texas and United States Province, Los Angeles, California) established and staffed Our Lady of Mount Carmel School (Twa).
- 1922–1980s – Sisters of Charity of the Incarnate Word from the New Orleans, Louisiana, province staffed the school.
- 1980s–2005 – Lay teachers and Sisters of Charity of the Incarnate Word staffed the school.
- 1990–1992 – The church became a parish and was administered by diocesan priests.
- 1992–present –Conventual Franciscans from Our Lady of Consolation Province, Mount St. Francis, Indiana, administer Our Lady of Mount Carmel.

== Photo gallery ==
=== May 1936 ===
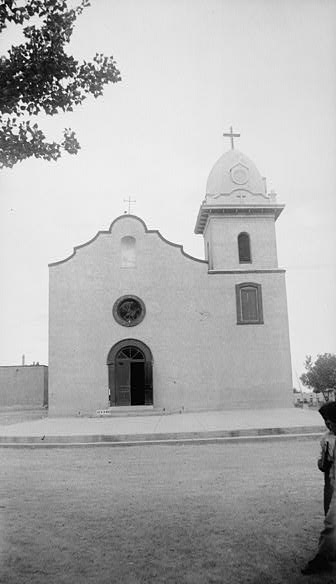
Front (north) view

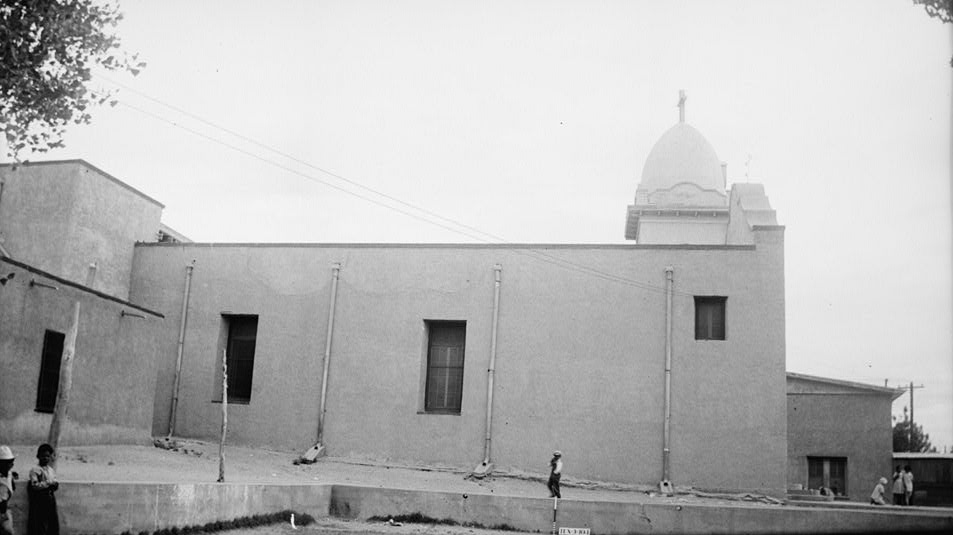
Rear (south) view

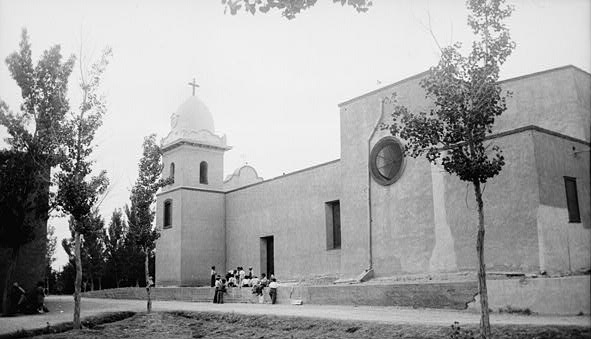
Northwest view

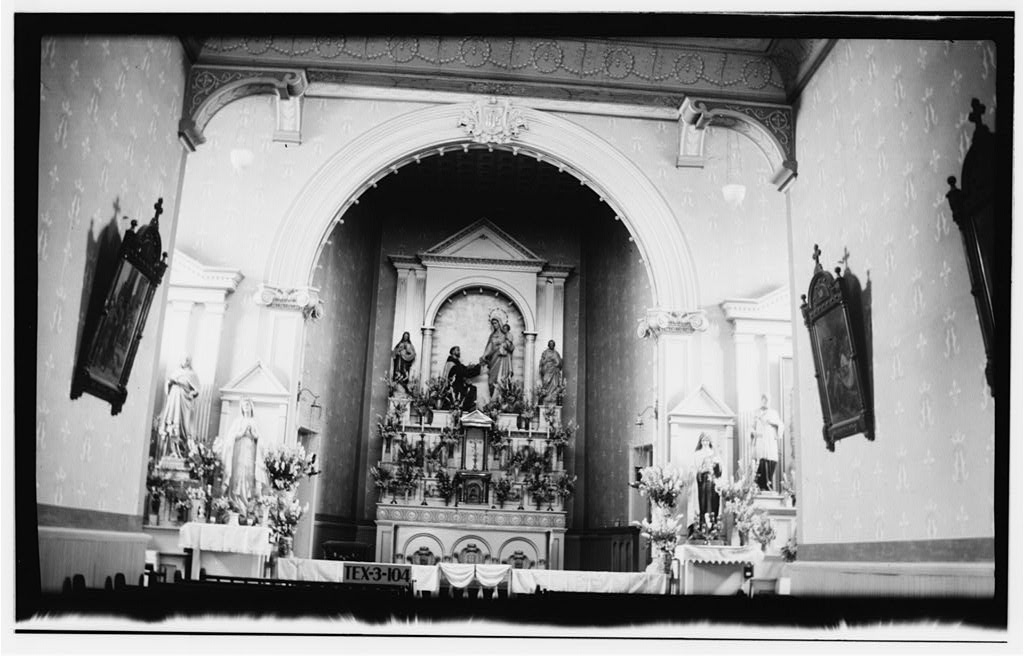
High Altar

=== July 2009 ===
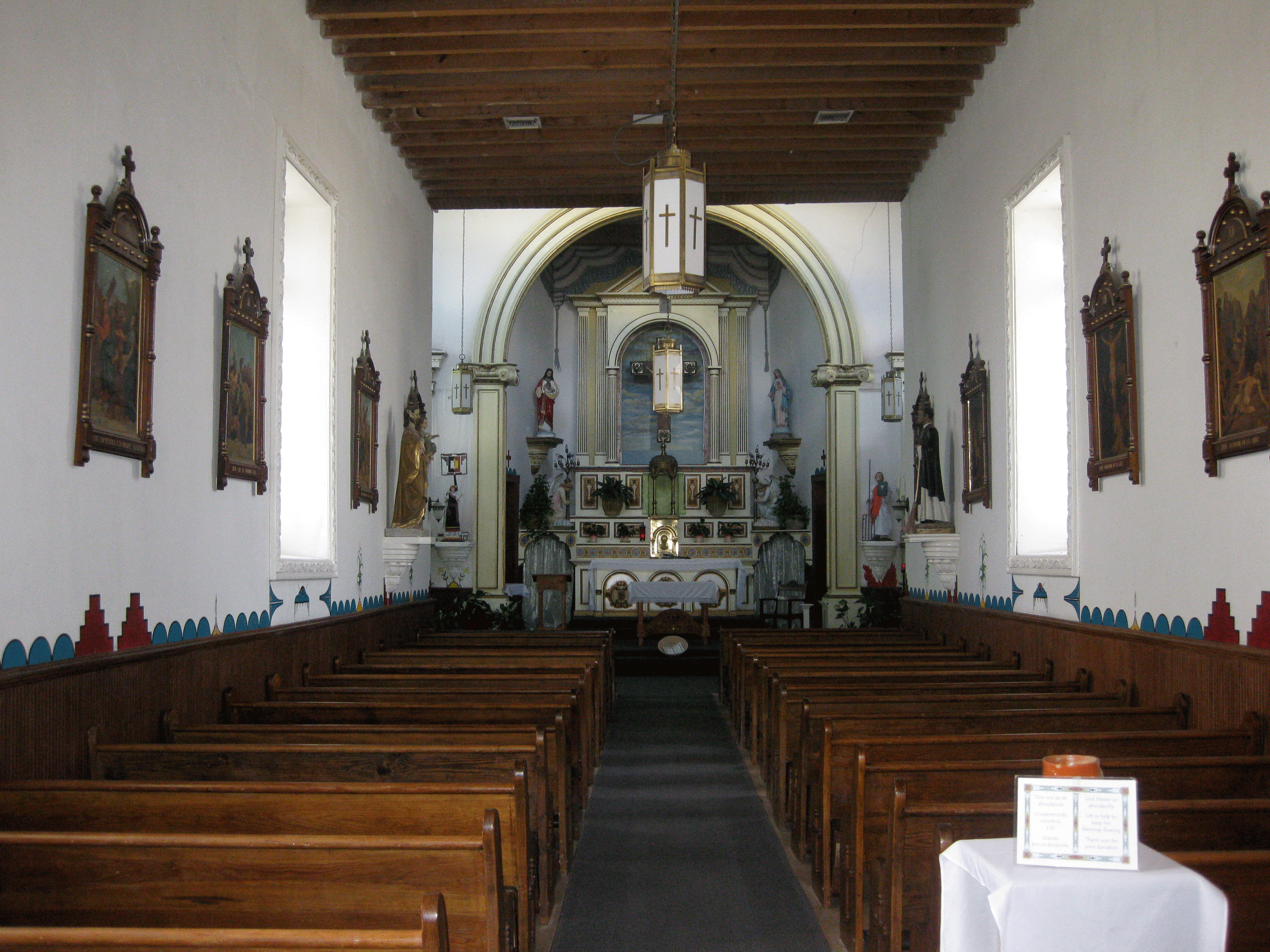
Interior of Church from front door. The altar is straight ahead.

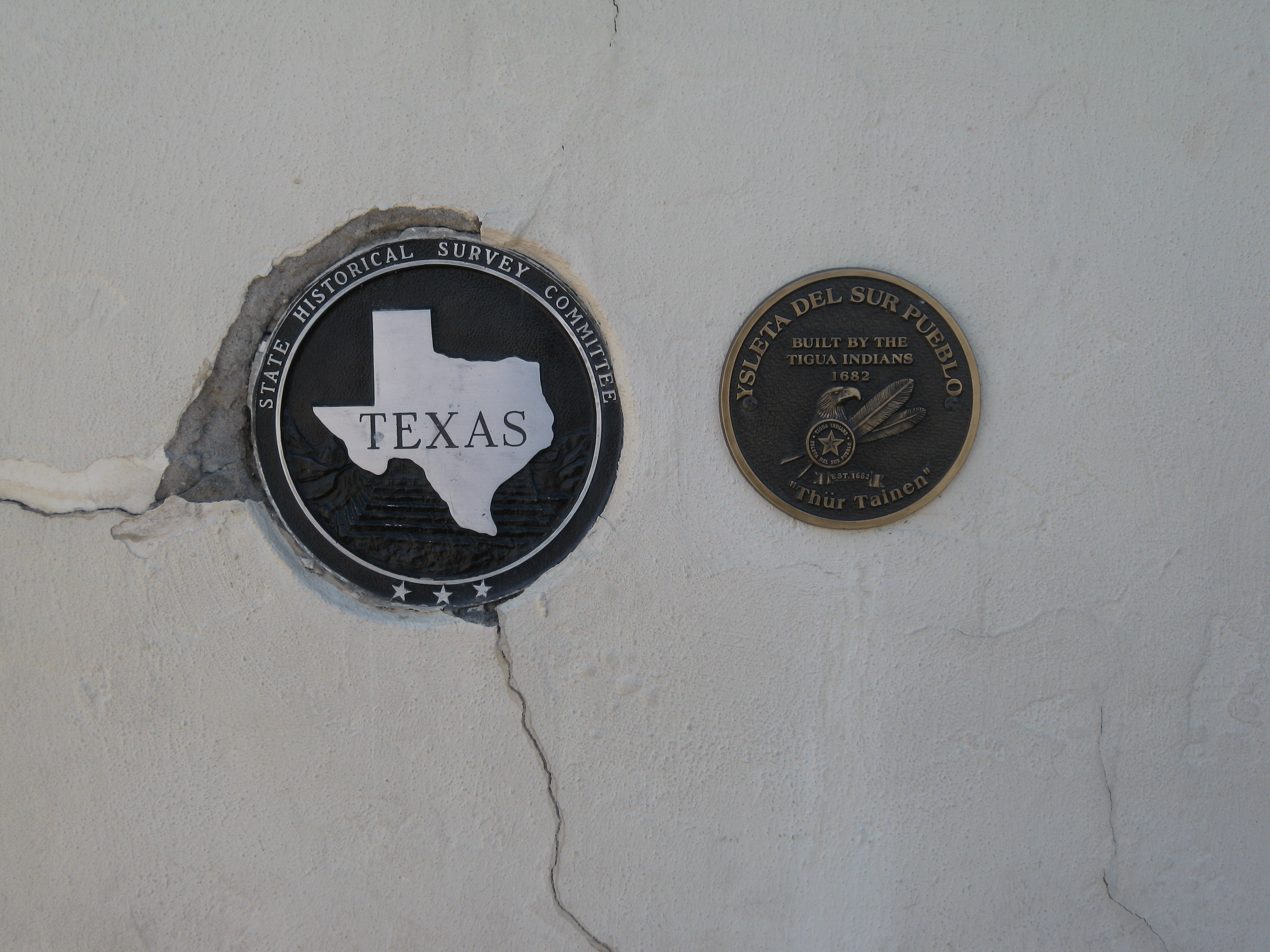
Historic markers.

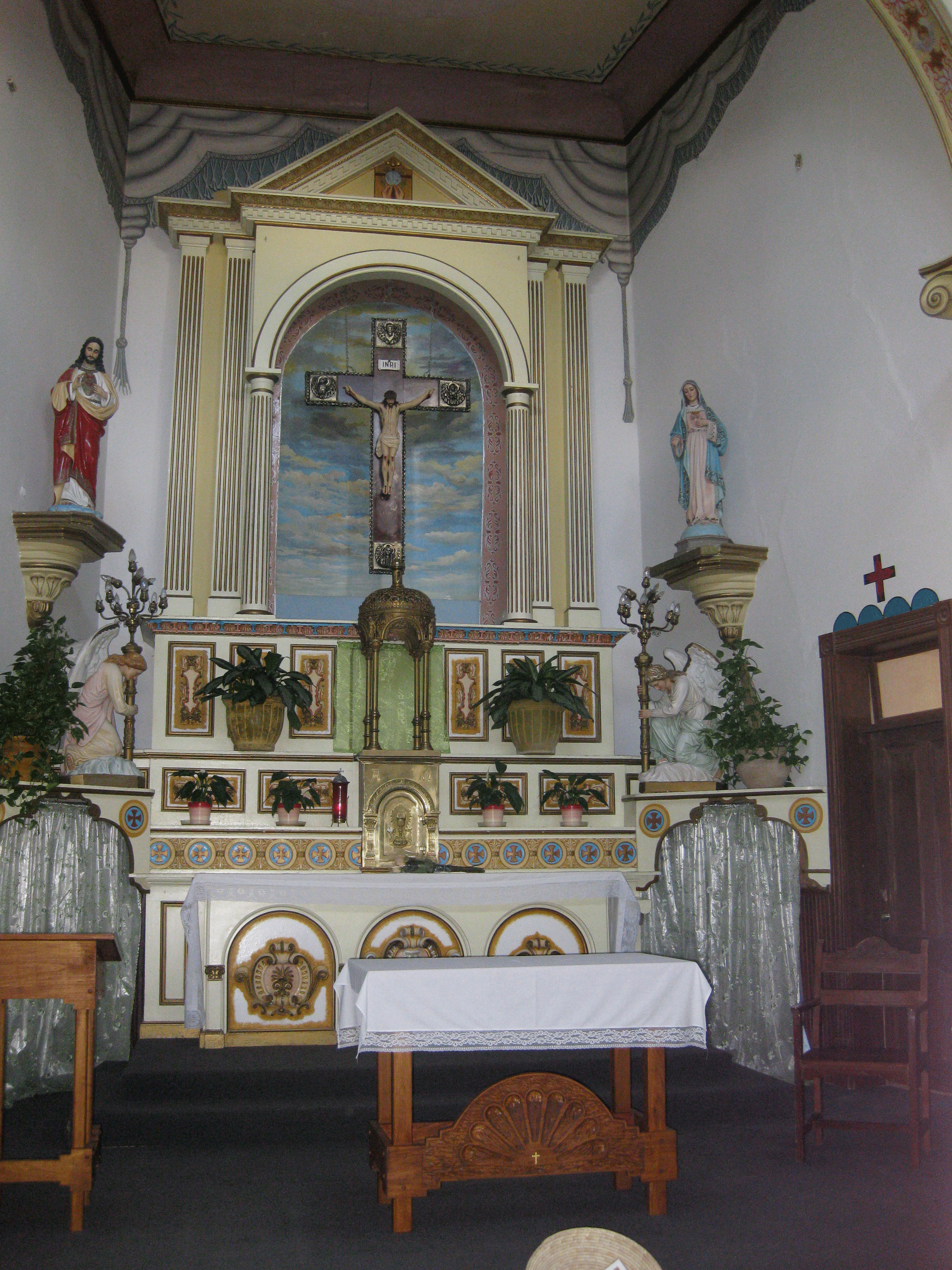
High Altar.

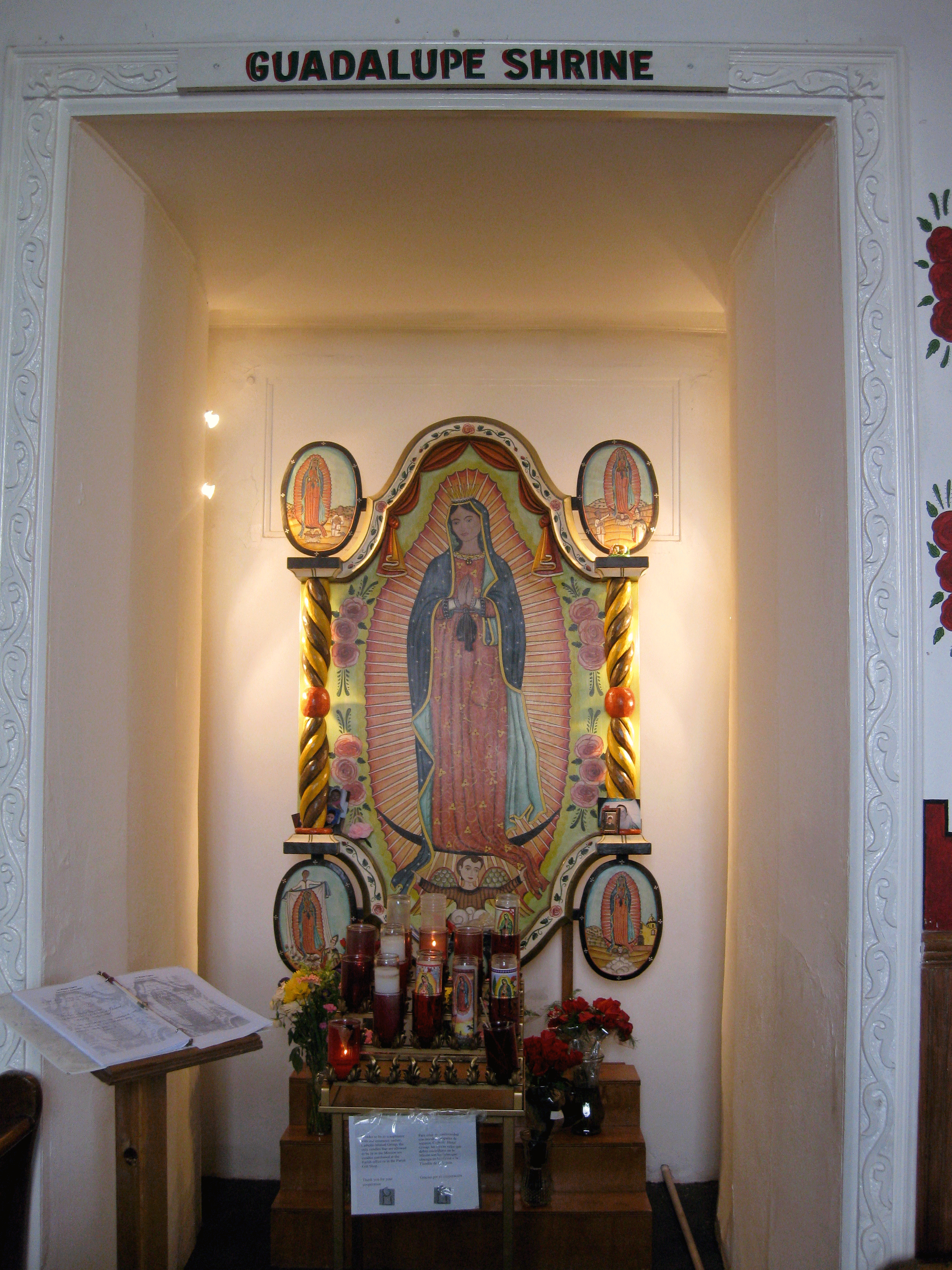
Our Lady of Guadalupe Shrine

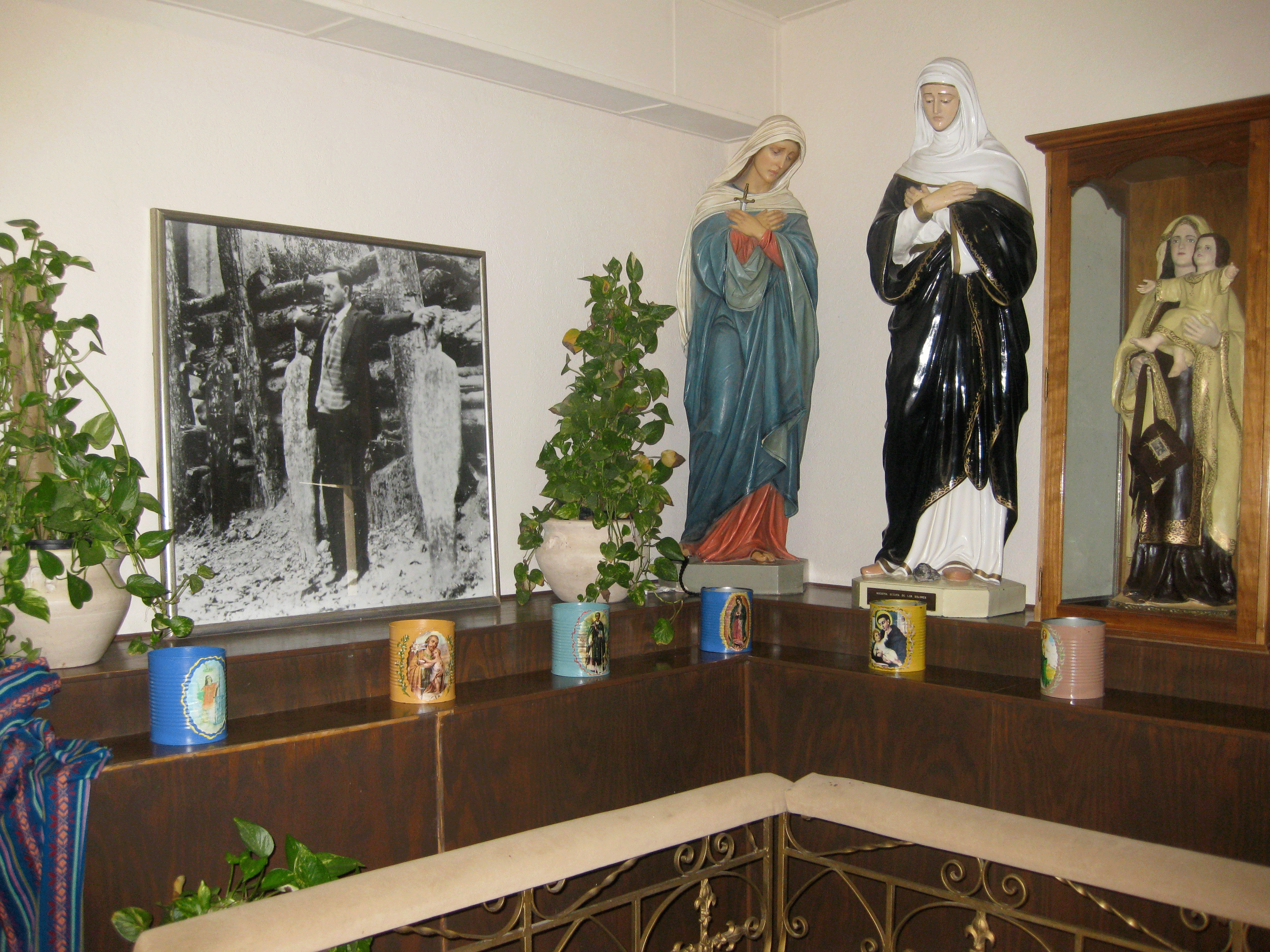
All Saints Chapel.

== See also ==
- Hueco Tanks
- Socorro Mission
- Mission Nuestra Señora de Guadalupe
- Town of Ysleta, El Paso, Texas
- National Register of Historic Places listings in El Paso County, Texas
- Recorded Texas Historic Landmarks in El Paso County
