= Ysleta High School =

School in El Paso, Texas, United States

Location
- 8600 Alameda Avenue; El Paso, Texas, El Paso 79907-6199; United States
- 31°42′6.2″N 106°20′27″W

Information
- School type: Public high school
- Motto: "Once An Indian, Always An Indian"
- Founded: 1927
- School district: Ysleta Independent School District
- Principal: Amelia Garcia
- Teaching staff: 76.30 (FTE)
- Grades: 9–12
- Enrollment: 1,168 (2024-2025)
- Student to teacher ratio: 15.31
- Colors: Maroon and white
- Fight song: All Hail, All Hail Ysleta
- Athletics conference: 5A-D1
- Mascot: Kawliga
- Newspaper: Pow Wow
- Yearbook: Otyokwa
- Feeder schools: Ysleta Middle, Rio Bravo, Ysleta Elementary, Pasodale, South Loop, Marian Manor and Capistrano.
- Website: www.yisd.net/ysletahigh

Ysleta High School is a high school in the Ysleta Independent School District in Ysleta, El Paso, Texas. It is located on 8600 Alameda and is the second-oldest school in the El Paso, TX area.

== Notable alumni ==
- Lamberto Alvarez (1972), artist
- Jay J. Armes, private investigator known for his prosthetic hands.
- Alicia R. Chacón (1957), member of the El Paso City Council
- John L. Chapin, United States Army captain
- Julio Gallardo (1976), professional basketball player in Puerto Rico and Mexico.
- Justin Maese, professional baseball pitcher
- Rafael Palomar (1969), basketball player, represented Mexico at the 1976 Summer Olympics
- Jim Price, former NFL linebacker for the New York Jets and the Denver Broncos.
- Sergio Troncoso, (1979) author, former president of the Texas Institute of Letters.
- Jesse Whittenton, former NFL defensive back for the Los Angeles Rams and the Green Bay Packers.
- Christopher Wilson, music producer/DJ known as Riot Ten.
