= Ysleta, El Paso, Texas =

Ysleta
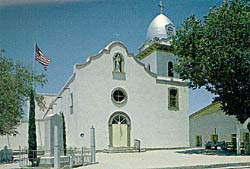
- Mission de Corpus Christi de la Ysleta

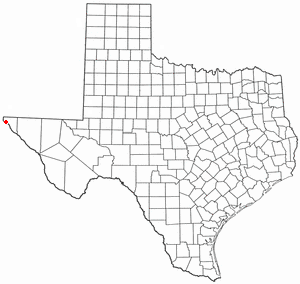
- Location in the state of Texas
- Coordinates: 31°35′05″N 106°16′22″W
- Country: United States
- State: Texas
- County: El Paso County
- Ysleta del Sur: 1682

Government
  - Tribal Governor: Vince Munoz

Area
  - Total: 0.066 sq mi (.17 km^{2})
- Elevation: 3,687 ft (1,124 m)

Population (2020)
  - Total: 26,161
- Time zone: UTC-6 (MDT)
  - Summer (DST): UTC-6 (CDT)
- Website: Ysleta Mission
- Average Annual Precipitation (inches)= 8.20

Ysleta is a community in El Paso, Texas, United States. Ysleta was settled between October 9 and October 12, 1680, when Spanish conquistadors, Franciscan clerics and Tigua Indians took refuge along the southern bank of the Rio Grande. These people were fleeing the Pueblo Revolt in New Mexico. Ysleta is the oldest European settlement in the area that is the present-day U.S. state of Texas.

== History ==
=== Settlement ===
Antonio de Otermín, the Spanish Governor, placed Fray Francisco de Ayeta as administrator of the refugee camp of those fleeing Popé's rebellion in 1680. The refugee camp and mission was placed approximately three miles south of the Rio Grande at the time. The Rio Grande was prone to both flooding and silt deposit.

=== Resettlement ===
The settlement and associated mission moved several times over the next few hundred years. In 1691, the original refugee mission was replaced by an adobe structure. A flood in 1740 washed away that mission. It was rebuilt on higher ground four years later. The Tigua (i.e. Tiwa people) of Ysleta were among the most faithful Christian converts in the area and the Spanish were keen to keep the settlement healthy and vibrant. In the period between 1829 and 1831, the river moved much further south than usual. In 1836, the new country of Texas claimed the new channel of the Rio Grande as the boundary. In 1848, with the ratification of the Treaty of Guadalupe Hidalgo, Ysleta was ceded to the United States. The mission was a stop on the Butterfield Overland Mail trail from 1858 to 1861.

=== The City of Ysleta ===
The neighboring community and county seat of San Elizario was a center of Hispanic influence in an increasing Anglo-dominated post-Civil War period. In 1873, Ysleta made a bid to become the county seat, but the elections were ignored or inconclusive until 1878, after the Salt War period. In response, the people of Ysleta incorporated as a Texas city in 1880. There were internal disputes as to whether the tax burden was worth the status as a city. There was also much opposition from the growing community of El Paso as to whether an "Indian" city should be the county seat. The railroad did not come to Ysleta, and in a strongly disputed election in which counted votes were nearly three times the number of voters, the county seat was moved to El Paso in 1883. The town government dissolved in 1895.

=== Fire ===
A chemical fire in 1907 damaged the Ysleta Mission. In 1916, the Rio Grande was dammed and the area was heavily irrigated. The resulting rise in the water table brought salt to the surface and the land became suitable for only salt-tolerant crops such as cotton.

=== Annexation ===
In 1955, El Paso annexed Ysleta, although residents voted against the change. Ysleta was allowed to keep its own school district (Ysleta Independent School District, which extends from the lower Valley into parts of Northeast El Paso), although that required an appeal to the Supreme Court.

=== Tiwa Revival ===
In the 1960s, Tom Diamond sued on the behalf of the Tiwa (known as the Tigua tribe in Spanish). The state of Texas was reluctant to recognize any Native American tribes, but in 1967 the Tiguas were formed legally as the Ysleta Del Sur Pueblo. The next year, the United States Congress also recognized the tribe.

== Education ==
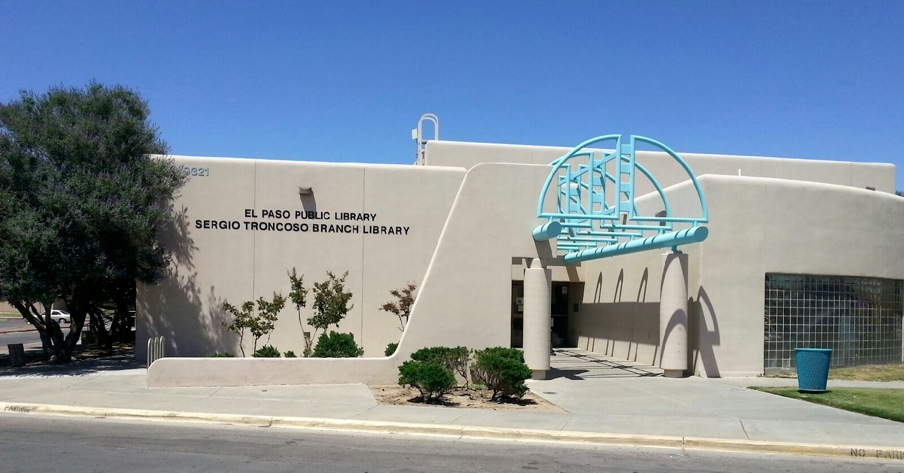
The Sergio Troncoso Library

Residents are served by the Ysleta Independent School District. Ysleta High School serves Ysleta.

The El Paso Public Library operates the Sergio Troncoso Branch in Ysleta.
