= Parkland High School (Texas) =

Public school in Texas, United States

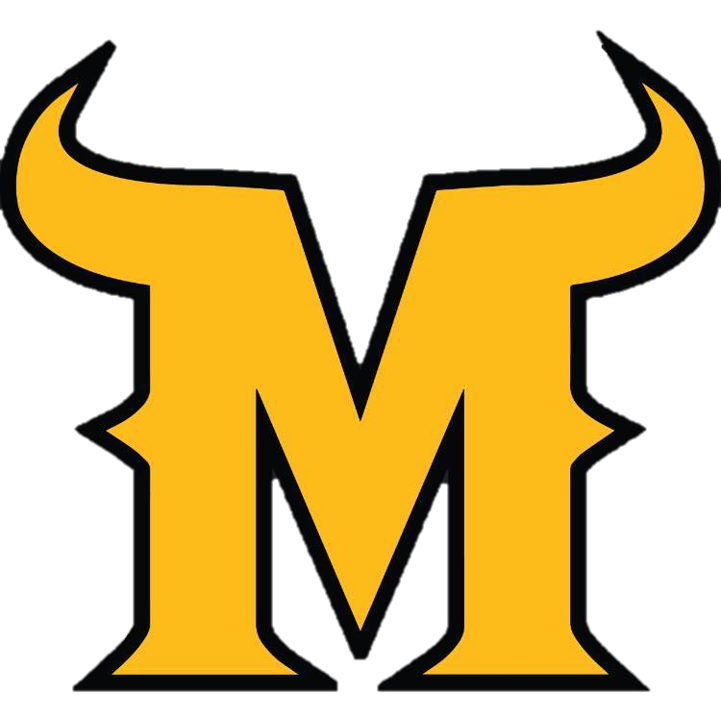

Location
- 5932 Quail Ave; El Paso, Texas 79924; United States; 31°54′9″N 106°24′7″W

Information
- School type: Public High School
- Opened: 1962
- School district: Ysleta Independent School District
- Principal: Javier Salgado
- Teaching staff: 102.44 (FTE)
- Grades: 9–12
- Enrollment: 1,582 (2023–24)
- Student to teacher ratio: 15.44
- Colors: Gold and black
- Nickname: Matadors "Mats"
- Publication: Parkland Panorama
- Newspaper: Parkland Sun
- Yearbook: The Arena
- Website: www.yisd.net/parklandhigh

Parkland High School is part of the Ysleta Independent School District in El Paso, Texas.

== Sports ==
Parkland High School offers the following sports:

- Baseball (boys)
- Basketball
- Cross Country
- Football (boys)
- Golf
- Soccer
- Softball (girls)
- Swimming
- Tennis
- Track and Field
- Volleyball (girls)
- Wrestling

== History ==
In 1958, Parkland Elementary School opened as the first Ysleta school in Northeast El Paso during a time of rapid population growth in the area. The school helped serve the growing community and laid the groundwork for the later opening of Parkland High School.

Parkland High School opened for the 1961-62 school year with C.G. Matthews as principal. The mascot chosen was the Matador. The first graduating class of Parkland was in 1964.

In 2017, Parkland High School opened a new chapter in its history with the new Parkland Early College High School

== Notable alumni ==
- Mike Jefferson, former NFL player
- Mike Williams, former NFL player
- Deion Hankins, NFL player
- David Leonard Wood, serial killer
