= Valle Verde, Quintana Roo =

Coordinates: 21.1112°N 86.9338°W

Valle Verde is a community in the municipality of Benito Juárez, Quintana Roo, Mexico.

The village was the scene of a dispute in September 2003 between two groups one composed of activists from Committee for a Constructive Tomorrow (CFACT), the Congress of Racial Equality (CORE), and the Competitive Enterprise Institute (CEI) wishing give away food to promote genetically modified crops and the other activists who were members of Friends of the Earth to discourage them.
