= Eastwood High School (Texas) =

Coordinates: 31.7718°N 106.3547°W

- 2430 McRae Blvd. El Paso, Texas; United States

Information
- Type: Public
- Motto: Home of El Paso's Finest
- Established: 1961
- School district: Ysleta Independent School District
- Principal: Robert Robledo
- Faculty: 143.38 (on an FTE basis)
- Grades: 9-12
- Enrollment: 2,295 (2024–2025)
- Student to teacher ratio: 16.01
- Campus: Urban
- Colors: Trooper Blue; Trooper Gold
- Athletics conference: 6A
- Mascot: Sarge the Trooper
- Yearbook: Eastwood Salute
- Website: www.yisd.net/o/eastwoodhigh

Eastwood High School is a public high school in the Ysleta Independent School District the city of El Paso, Texas, United States.

== History ==
Eastwood High School, "Home of El Paso's Finest," is located in the city of El Paso, Texas. Eastwood opened in the Fall of 1961 and had its first graduating senior class in 1965. Today, Eastwood High School has 400+ graduates annually. The school is in the Ysleta Independent School District. In 1976, Eastwood High School Troopers won the Class 4A (now 6A) State Championship in basketball as the underdog of the state tourney; as of 2025, the feat has yet to be repeated by any other El Paso basketball team.

The famed Trooper mascot is based on the Union Cavalry Soldiers during the American Civil War. Both the school and the cavalry units share the blue and gold color scheme.

In 2013, the Texas UIL changed the realignments. As of 2025 Eastwood High School is now in the UIL 6A division and the only 6A high school in the Ysleta Independent School District.

Following the passage of a district-wide renovation bond, the original 1965 Eastwood building was demolished and replaced with a state-of-the-art, 21st-century school building. The total cost of the building is $93 million, with it being completed in August 2019.

== Extracurricular activities ==
=== Sports ===
==== Boys ====
- Baseball
- Basketball
  - Won the Texas 4A State Championship in 1976
- Cheerleading
- Cross Country
  - Won the Texas 5A State Championship in 2018 and 2019
- Football
- Golf
- Gymnastics
- Soccer
- Swimming
- Tennis
- Track and field
- Wrestling

==== Girls ====
- Basketball
- Cheerleading
- Cross Country
- Golf
- Gymnastics
- Saltatrix
- Soccer
- Softball
- Swimming
- Tennis
- Track and Field
- Trooperettes
- Volleyball
- Wrestling
  - UIL 2020 5A State Champions

== Notable alumni ==
- Jack Handey, best known for his Deep Thoughts segments on Saturday Night Live
- Butch Henry, former Major League Baseball pitcher
- Frank Castillo, former Major League Baseball pitcher
- Eric Jack (class of 1990), former National Football League defensive back, Atlanta Falcons, University of New Mexico
- Cesar J. Blanco, Texas State Senator representing District 29, former member of the Texas House of Representatives from House District 76 (2015 —2021)
- Ronn Lucas, American ventriloquist and comedian
