= Valle Verde Early College High School =

Public school in Texas, United States

Location
- 919 Hunter Drive; El Paso, Texas 79915; United States; 31.753115°N 106.365749°W

Information
- School type: Early College High School
- Established: 2007
- School district: Ysleta Independent School District
- Principal: Claudia Canava-Flores
- Teaching staff: 19.12 (on an FTE basis)
- Grades: 9–12
- Gender: Coed
- Enrollment: 307 (2023–24)
- Student to teacher ratio: 16.06
- Colors: Yellow and Green
- Athletics conference: 4A
- Mascot: Spartan
- Publication: Spartan Media
- Yearbook: Xiphos
- Website: https://www.yisd.net/valleverdeearlycollege

Valle Verde Early College High School is a high school located in El Paso, Texas. Students graduate from high school with both a high school diploma and an associate degree from El Paso Community College. As an early college high school, VVECHS is a school that boasts students of a high academic rigor, who are chosen to be best suited for the task of taking high school and college courses in tandem.

== History ==
Valle Verde Early College High School opened on August 27, 2007. 125 students were accepted the first year with five teachers on staff. The students successfully finished the year with a 100% passing average on the reading TAKS, something no other high school in the Ysleta Independent School District has ever achieved. On August 25, 2008 a new class of 108 students was introduced, making the estimated number of students 233, since some students were not allowed to return the following year due to not being able to keep up with the intense teaching environment. The second class also achieved a 100% passing average on the reading TAKS. As of August 23, 2010 there are four classes (9th Grade, 10th Grade, etc.) with a total of 383 students currently attending VVECHS, typical of a North American secondary school.

== Campus ==
The school is located on El Paso Community College's Valle Verde campus, just south of Interstate 10 at Hawkins and North Loop. Classes are currently held in portable classrooms, there are currently no plans to construct a purpose-built structure on the school campus.

== Curriculum ==
Students take high school and college courses concurrently. Students may choose to pursue an Associate of Arts Degree, Associate of Science Degree or Associate of Arts in Teaching Degree.

== Intramural activities ==
Texas Early College High Schools do not offer the traditional high school extracurricular activities, such as sports, and prefers to focus on a rigorous academic curriculum instead. Students are expected to participate in at least one of the numerous intramural activities offered. Student groups and activities at Valle Verde include Academic Decathlon, Art Club, Class of 20XX, Drama Club, FBLA, High Q, National Honor Society, Chem Club, Robotics Team, Social Studies, Student Council, UIL Math, and Yearbook.
