= Ysleta Independent School District =

School district in Texas, United States

District information
- Superintendent: Xavier De La Torre
- Schools: 59

Students and staff
- Students: 43,680
- Faculty: 6,155
- Teachers: 3,075

Ysleta Independent School District is a school district based in El Paso, Texas (USA). Ysleta ISD is the third largest school district in the city of El Paso. All of the district area covers sections of El Paso.

The Ysleta Independent School District was founded in 1915 as a rural education district with one high school, Ysleta High School and a number of elementary and intermediate schools. As the city of El Paso grew, many of the schools of the YISD were absorbed into the city. Today the district has 59 campuses.

During the 1990s, the district operated at state minimum achievement levels. Due to changes in leadership, the district turned itself around and in 1998 it emerged the first urban school district anywhere in the state to be named a "Recognized District" for student performance on the Texas Assessment of Academic Skills test or TAAS. Ten district schools have been named National Blue Ribbon Schools while eight others are National Title One Distinguished Campuses.

Ysleta ISD's superintendent is Xavier De La Torre.

In 2009, the school district was rated "academically acceptable" by the Texas Education Agency.

The Texas Education Agency's college readiness performance data shows that only 5% (148 out of 2836 students) of the graduates of the class of 2010 of the Ysleta school district met TEA's average performance criterion on SAT or ACT college admission tests.

== Demographics ==
Mexican Americans make up a large number of students. Margarita Espino Calderón and Liliana Minaya-Rowe, authors of Designing and Implementing Two-Way Bilingual Programs, wrote that the student population of Ysleta ISD was "heterogenous."

== List of schools ==
As of 2005, 22 schools had two-way bilingual educational programs.

=== Secondary schools ===
==== High schools ====
- Bel Air High School-
  - 1999-2000 National Blue Ribbon School
- Del Valle High School -
- Eastwood High School -
- J. M. Hanks High School -
- Parkland High School -
- Riverside High School -
- Ysleta High School -
- Valle Verde Early College High School -

==== Middle schools ====
- Bel Air Middle School
- Del Valle Middle School
- Desert View Middle School (Abandoned)
  - 1983-84 National Blue Ribbon School
- Eastwood Middle School
  - A Texas School to Watch: 2011–2012, 2013-2014
- Hanks Middle School
- Parkland Middle School
- Rio Bravo Middle School (CLOSED)
- Riverside Middle School
- Ysleta Middle School

=== Elementary-intermediate (K-8) schools ===
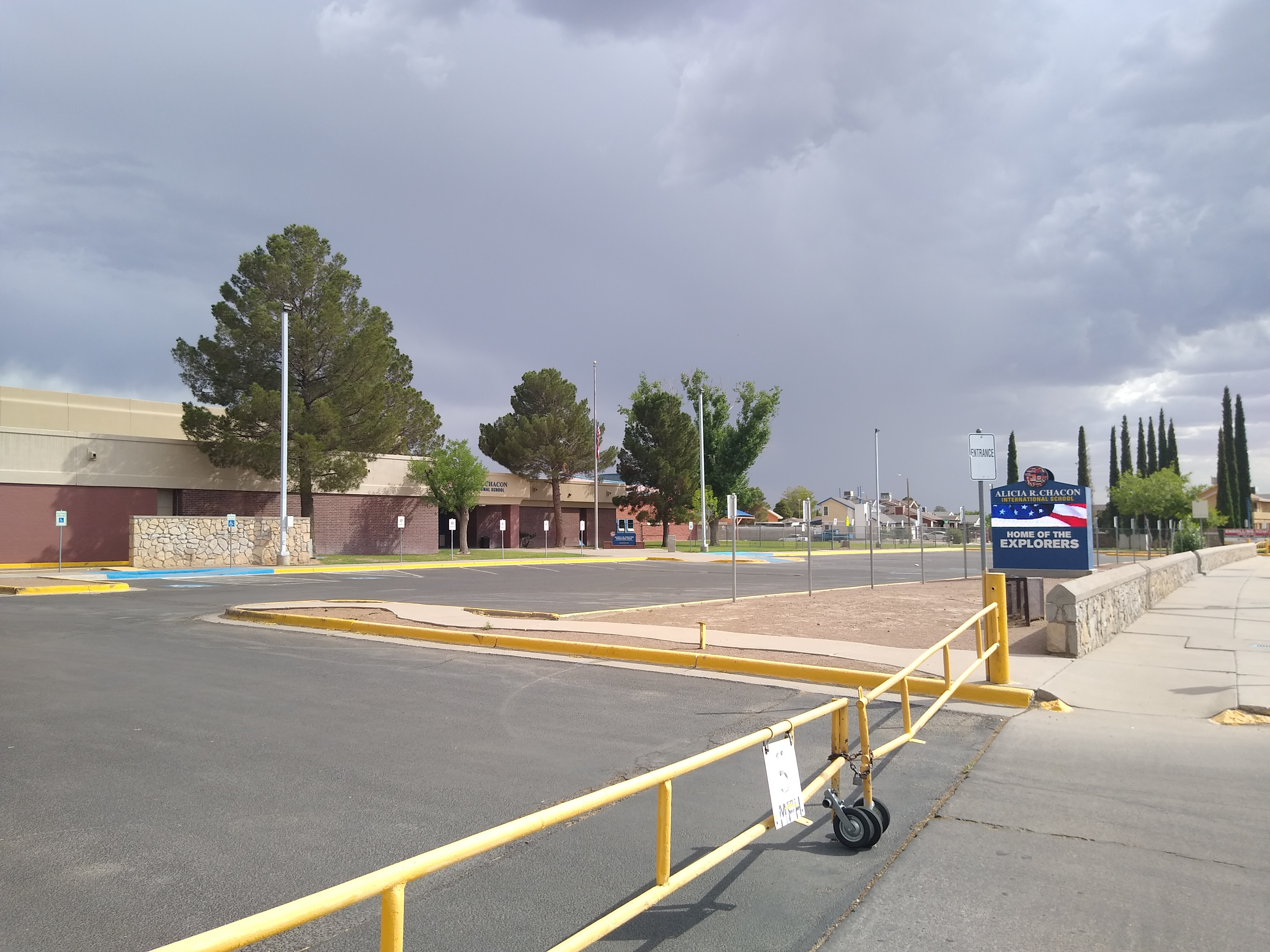
Alicia R. Chacón International School

- Alicia R. Chacón International School
- Eastwood Knolls School

=== Elementary schools ===
- Ascarate Elementary School
  - 1998-99 National Blue Ribbon School
- Capistrano Elementary School
- Cedar Grove Elementary School (Demolished)
- Constance Hulbert Elementary School (CLOSED)
- Del Norte Heights Elementary School (CLOSED)
- Del Valle Elementary School
- Desertaire Elementary School
- Dolphin Terrace Elementary School
- East Point Elementary School
- Eastwood Heights Elementary School
- Edgemere Elementary School
  - 2000-01 National Blue Ribbon School
- Glen Cove Elementary School
  - 2000-01 National Blue Ribbon School
- Hacienda Heights Elementary School (Closed)
  - 2000-01 National Blue Ribbon School
- Lancaster Elementary School
- LeBarron Park Elementary School (CLOSED)
- Loma Terrace Elementary School
- Marian Manor Elementary School (CLOSED)
- Mesa Vista Elementary School (CLOSED)
- Mission Valley Elementary School
- North Loop Elementary School
  - 1987-88 National Blue Ribbon School
- North Star Elementary School
- Parkland Elementary School
- Pasodale Elementary School
- Pebble Hills Elementary School
- Presa Elementary School
- R.E.L. Washington Elementary School
- Ramona Elementary School (Renamed Ramona STEM)
  - 2007, 2021 National Blue Ribbon School
- Riverside Elementary School
- Sageland Elementary School
  - 1998-99 National Blue Ribbon School
- Scotsdale Elementary School
- South Loop Elementary School (CLOSED)
- Thomas Manor Elementary School
- Tierra Del Sol Elementary School
- Vista Hills Elementary School
- Ysleta Elementary School

=== Pre-kindergarten centers ===
- Parkland Pre-K
- Ysleta Pre-K

=== Alternative campuses ===
- Cesar Chavez Academy
- Thrive Academy

=== Special campuses ===
- Ysleta Community Learning Center
- Young Women's Leadership Academy

== See also ==
- List of school districts in Texas
