= Francisco de Ayeta =

Spanish Franciscan missionary

Personal details
- Born: 17th century (c. 1640) Pamplona, Spain
- Died: ca. 1690 (aged 49-50) unknown
- Profession: Franciscan missionary
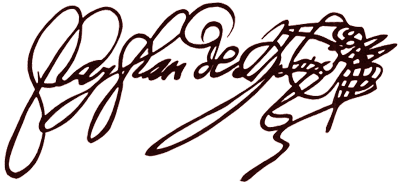
- Signature

Francisco de Ayeta (dates unknown) was a Spanish Franciscan missionary of the 17th century, in New Spain.

== Life ==
Francisco de Ayeta, missionary, was born in Pamplona, Spain, in 1640. He entered the Franciscan order at the age of nineteen, he became successively Visitor of the Province of the Holy Evangel of New Mexico, and its Procurator at Madrid as well as Commissary of the Inquisition in New Spain.

Ayeta investigated remote missions personally, especially those of New Mexico, and he was the first to warn the Spanish authorities of the incipient Pueblo Revolt. His report, from 1678, induced the authorities of New Spain to reinforce the garrison at Santa Fe, but it was too late. The Pueblos broke out on 10 August, 1680, and for 14 years New Mexico was lost to Spain. Ayeta hurried to El Paso, and when 2000 fugitives from the North reached that post, Ayeta was the first to offer them the needed relief in food and clothing. Ayeta died in 1690 in Spain.

== Works ==
Three books are known to have been published by him, all without date and place.

- Apología del orden de San Francisco en América (about 1690)
- Defensa de la provincia del Santa Evangelio de México sobre la retención de los curatos y doctrinas
- Ultimo recurso de la provincia de San José de Yucatan sobre despojo de parroquias

In these works, he aggressively defended the missionary work of the regular clergy in Mexico.
