= Juan Durán de Miranda =

Spanish governor of New Mexico (fl. 1664–75)

21st and 24th Spanish Governor of New Mexico
- In office 1664–1665
- Preceded by: Tomé Dominguez de Mendoza
- Succeeded by: Fernando de Villanueva
- In office 1671–1675
- Preceded by: Juan de Medrano y Mesía
- Succeeded by: Juan Francisco Treviño

Personal details
- Profession: soldier and administrator (governor of New Mexico)

Juan Durán de Miranda was a soldier who served as governor of New Mexico in the 1600s. He occupied the charge of governor of New Mexico twice (1664-1665 and 1671-1675). The existing information on him is scarce.

== Career ==
Durán de Miranda was appointed governor of New Mexico for in 1664. He was expelled and arrested in 1665. Despite this, he was appointed for a second term in New Mexico in 1671.

However, one year later, in 1665 a faction led by Tomé Domínguez de Mendoza accused (and filed charges against) Durán de Miranda, which caused Miranda to be imprisoned in a brief time period in the Casa de Cabildo (Council jail) in Santa Fe. In addition, all his goods were seized. However, he was released when he presented arguments against the charges for which he is charged in Mexico City, recovering his property and position.

Again in the New Mexico government, church and state clashed, which weakened the colonial administration. This caused Native American people to increasingly reject the Spanish Empire. In addition, the Mission Supply Service, founded by the Mansso administration, reduced the food and other products that distributed among the indigenous population, causing them to rebel against the Miranda government.

In July 1671, Durán de Miranda elevated Juan Dominguez de Mendoza to Field marshal rank and led a military campaign against the Gila Apache and the "Siete Ríos Apaches", in the South of New Mexico.

In 1675, Durán de Miranda was replaced by Juan Francisco Treviño and he emigrated to Mexico City.
