= Toboso people =

Indigenous group of Chihuahua

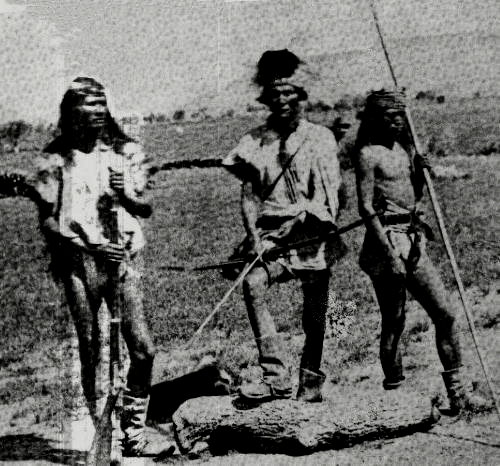
Tobosos in Coahuila

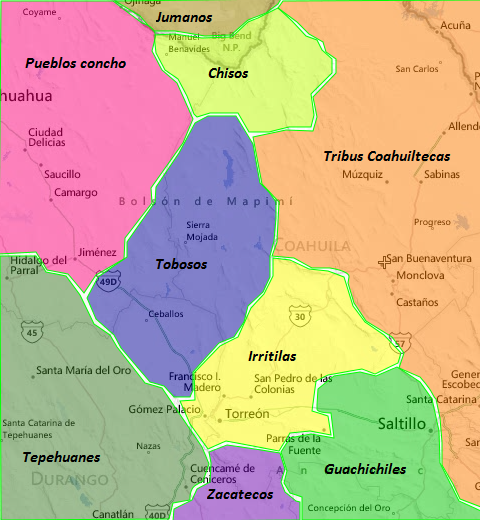
Map of Toboso territory

The Toboso people were an Indigenous group of what is today the northern Bolsón de Mapimí region. They were associated with the Jumano and are sometimes identified as having been part of the Jumano people.

The Toboso were associated with the inhabitants of La Junta de los Rios near Presidio, Texas. However their living further south and more exposed to Spanish slaving raids led to them having a different reaction to Spanish explorers. For example, while the Indians at La Junta, often collectively called Jumanos, welcomed Antonio Espejo's expedition in 1583, the Toboso fled from his expedition in terror.

The Toboso began to attack Spanish controlled and Rarámuri inhabited missions and mines to their west in the 1640s. Later many of the Toboso were taken to the missions around Monterrey, Mexico. While there they learned Spanish. A large number of the Toboso left the missions and rejected Christianity. The Toboso were classed as "ladinos" Indians by the Spaniards, a term meaning "cunning" and indicating they knew the Spanish way of life and used it to be more effective in fighting the Spanish. The Toboso also made significant raids against the Rarámuri missions and ranches in the 1690s.

In the 1680s the Jumano at La Junta were so little aligned with the Toboso that Juan Sabeata was still willing to cooperate with Juan de Retana after Retana spent some time fighting against the Toboso.

The Toboso were organized by bands. The number of bands decreased over time. In the 1680s there were 12 bands. As of 1693 the Spanish identified only four Toboso bands, the Osatayogliglas, Guazapayogliglas, Chichitames, (Note: Alternate spellings include Chichitamen and Chuchitamen.) and Sisimbles.

By 1800 the Toboso who remained in modern Mexico had been essentially absorbed into Hispanic culture. However other Toboso migrated to coastal Texas where they resided in and near Mission Nuestra Señora del Refugio from 1807 until at least 1828. These dates are based on baptismal records kept at that mission identifying Toboso present there. Matagorda Island was known in the 18th century, at least from 1776 on as Toboso Island and was inhabited by people who had fled Mission Rosario and Mission Espiritu Santo as well as Karakawans. It is possible this name reflected some Tobosos people being among those who lived on the island.
