= Mission San Lorenzo =

Spanish mission in New Mexico

Mission San Lorenzo was established near El Paso del Norte by Fray Francisco Ayeta. Arriving there on October 9, 1680, Governor Antonio de Otermín established the site as his headquarters after fleeing the Pueblo Revolt. Suma Indians then occupied the area, with their numbers falling from 155 in 1750 to 58 in 1760. Eventually incorporated into the town of Ascarate, the area is now part of El Paso, Texas.

== See also ==
- Spanish missions in Texas
- Spanish missions in New Mexico
- Santa Fe de Nuevo México
- Pueblo Revolt
