= Diego de Guadalajara expedition =

1654 Spanish Expedition to the Concho River, Texas

The Diego de Guadalajara expedition of 1654 was a Spanish expedition dispatched to follow up on the finding of freshwater pearls from pearl mussels in the Concho River in what is now Texas. Although results were disappointing, the expedition led to continued contact with the people of the area and then to Spanish settlement in and around San Angelo, Texas.

== Castillo-Martin expedition ==
In 1650, Hernando de Ugarte y la Concha, governor of New Mexico, dispatched an expedition from Santa Fe, led by Captains Diego del Castillo and Hernan Martin, to explore what is now north-central Texas. The Castillo-Martin expedition travelled about 520 miles (840 km) southeast from Santa Fe along the route that had been taken by Dominican friar Juan de Salas when he visited the Jumano Indians in 1632. They reached the Concho River, and then what they called the Río de las Perlas ("Pearl River"). They named the Concho River ("river of shells") after the Tampico pearly mussel (Cyrtonaias tampicoensis), which they found there.

Some members of the expedition went another 130 miles (210 km) southeast until they came to the boundary of the large and populous territory of the Tejas Indians, but did not continue further because they were unsure of how they would be received. The Tejas chief heard of the Spanish presence and sent an envoy to meet with them. The expedition remained in the region for six months, and collected samples of the freshwater pearls. These were sent to Luis Enríquez de Guzmán, 9th Count of Alba de Liste and viceroy of New Spain, and were part of the reason for the subsequent Guadalajara expedition.

== Guadalajara expedition ==
The Diego de Guadalajara entrada (expedition) was launched in 1654 to follow up on Castillo's findings. The expedition probably set out before Easter of 1654, led by Sergeant Major Diego de Gaulalajara and including 30 soldiers and 200 Christian Indians, and travelled to the Concho River in Jumano country as had the previous expedition. According to Christoval de Anaya, speaking in 1663 when on trial for heresy, the expedition traveled 300 leagues east for nine months through country inhabited by friendly but non-Christian Indians.

The main body of the expedition remained on the Concho, encamping among the Jumanos. The Jumanos were recruited to harvest mussels in the hope that they would contain gem-quality pearls. Meanwhile, Captain Andrés López travelled with a party of 12 soldiers about 80 miles (130 km) east, where they found a ranchería of "Cuitao" (Note: The Cuitao are only mentioned in 17th-century records. They may well have been Wichita people.) people. They fought these people and took 200 prisoners, with 200 bundles of animal skins. When the López party rejoined the main expedition, the combined force returned to Santa Fe with their rich haul of pelts and slaves.

== Results ==
The expedition had found far fewer pearls than they had expected, but the Spanish had become interested in the region. No records remain of specific expeditions during the next 30 years, but the Mexican archives hold evidence that many trading journeys were undertaken. The Spanish probably exchanged iron tools and horses for pelts and buffalo meat. Juan Domínguez de Mendoza, who had been a member of the 1654 Guadalajara expedition, led another expedition into the area in 1683-1684. The Spanish built missions, and eventually built the town of San Angelo. In modern times, a fishery still exists for the mussels and their pearls.
