= Gila Apache =

Apache community indigenous to the southwestern United States

The Gila Apache, also known as Gileños, Gilans, or Apaches de Xila, are a Southern Athabaskan-speaking Apache community Indigenous to southwestern New Mexico, southeastern Arizona, and northern Mexico. Their homelands included the Gila, Mimbres, Mogollon, Black Range, Hatch, Monticello Canyon (Cañada Alamosa), and Mesilla Valley regions. Spanish colonial sources sometimes used the spelling Xila, which later developed into the modern form Gila.

The Fort Thorn Treaty of 1855 concluded between the United States and the Mimbres Bands of Gila Apache, identifying different bands and sub-band leaders from different regions. Today, descendants of the Gila Apache are based in Doña Ana County, New Mexico, and have family ties throughout Sierra, Socorro, Catron, Grant, Luna and Hidalgo Counties.

== Geography ==
The Gila Apache historically lived in the mountains, valleys, and river corridors of southwestern New Mexico, including the Rio Grande, the Mimbres, the Gila, and the San Francisco River. The San Andres, Sierra Madre, Burro, and Datil Mountains marked their ancestral eastern, southern, western, and northern territorial borders. Significant valleys include Hatch, Mesilla, Animas, Gila, Monticello Canyon (Cañada Alamosa), and Tularosa (Catron County). These areas supported a mixed subsistence system of hunting, gathering, and irrigated farming, with archaeological and documentary evidence of fields and irrigation ditches in the Mimbres–Gila drainages.

The Mesilla Valley connected Gila Apache communities to the wider New Mexico–Texas–Chihuahua borderlands, where interaction occurred with Puebloan, Piro–Manso–Tiwa, Suma, and Spanish/Mexican populations at El Paso del Norte. Records from the mission of Nuestra Señora de Guadalupe describe a multi-tribal population that included Apaches among its residents.

In the late 17th century, Gila Apache leader El Chilmo and Capitán Chiquito, a Manso ranchería leader, appear in accounts from the El Paso–Janos–Suma region. Their alliances with Manso and Suma groups were tied to uprisings of the 1660s–1680s, which also involved Gila Apache in the Mesilla Valley and Black Range. Following the Pueblo Revolt (1680) and subsequent unrest (1684), some Gila Apache joined western Pueblos, Navajo, and other Apache communities in regional alliances.

== Ethnographic Framing ==
In some modern scholarship, the terms Apaches de Xila (Xila Apache) or Gileño Apache are described as subdivisions of the Chiricahua. However, ethnohistorical evidence indicates that these groups were a part of a broader Gila Apache identity. The Gila Apache were made up of four principal bands. Early Spanish references place the Apaches de Xila, recognized as early as 1626, in what is now Sierra and Socorro Counties of New Mexico, a region later associated with the Chilmos Apache, and with the Mimbreños Apache (Chihene). The colonial spelling 'Xila' later evolved into the current spelling 'Gila.'

This identity was formally acknowledged in treaties. In 1790, four Gila Apache leaders, including Jasquenelte, signed an agreement with Spain outlining territorial boundaries in southwestern New Mexico, described through mountain ranges as landmarks. These boundaries were reaffirmed in the 1838 treaty with Mexico. A separate treaty was signed the U.S. at Acoma, New Mexico, in 1852 and later ratified by the U.S. Senate. There were subsequent treaties in 1853 and 1855.

Historian John Upton Terrell noted multiple Apache groups, some of whom had adopted Christianity through peace established with Spaniards in Gila Apache territory. Historian John P. Wilson emphasized that the Gila, Mimbres, Mogollon, Black Range, and Mesilla Valley areas formed the cultural and geographic core of Gila Apache life, predating later colonial and American ethnographic classifications.

Colonial records often used "Gila Apache" as a general term for Apachean groups west of the Rio Grande. Pollard’s Map 3 accurately distinguishes between ‘Gila’ and Chiricahua Apache reservations (during 1860–1879) listing Santa Lucia, Tularosa, and Hot Springs under ‘Gila’ and the Chiricahua reservation separately, rather than merging Gila into the Chiricahua identity. Opler's use of the label 'Eastern Chiricahua' tends to privilege the Chiricahua name and obscure the separate recognition of the Gila identity. Evidence of this broad application includes Gila Apache reservation, established northwest of Silver City, New Mexico, which remained mostly unoccupied for two decades before being returned to the public domain by 1882. Government and academic records sometimes blurred the distinctions between Western Apache, Chiricahua, and Gila Apache perpetuating a false hierarchy. Instead, Chiricahua bands were part of the wider Gila Apache identity, with overlapping territories and kinship networks extending into Arizona, New Mexico, and northern Mexico.

== History ==
=== Spanish colonial period (1600s–1821) ===
Spanish records from the early 17th century identify the Apaches de Xila, also called Gileños. In 1626, Fray Alonso de Benavides described contact with a Gila Apache leader named Sanaba, one of the earliest named references to the group. Archaeological and documentary sources indicate that Gila Apache communities combined hunting and gathering with farming and irrigation in valleys such as the Gila, Mimbres, and Black Range.

During the mid-17th century, leaders including El Chimo (Apache) and Capitán Chiquito (Manso) appear in records from the El Paso–Janos–Suma corridor. These alliances placed Gila Apache in regional resistance movements of the 1660s–1680s. Following the Pueblo Revolt (1680) and subsequent uprisings (1684), some Gila Apache and allied groups relocated into western Pueblo, Navajo, and Apache communities. As the 17th century drew to a close, the Spaniard had identified four principal Gila Apache bands west of the Rio Grande - the Chilmos, the Gileños, the Apache Colorados, and the Salineros.

Griffen documents that, in 1768, the 'Gileños Chafalotes,' journeyed from the Gila River region to Albuquerque to broker a peace treaty with Spanish officials. By 1786, the Spanish were negotiating sanctuaries of established peace near presidios, where Apaches would be safe from Spanish military campaigns being launched against their kinsmen. In 1790, the Gila Apache leader Jasquenelte signed a treaty with Spain, which used mountain ranges to mark boundaries of Gila Apache territory in what is now southwestern New Mexico.

=== Mexican period (1821–1848) ===
After Mexican independence, Gila Apache communities remained active across southwestern New Mexico and northern Mexico. Military campaigns from presidios in Chihuahua and Sonora sought to contain Apache groups, while raiding and counter-raiding persisted. By the time of the 1831 uprising, Mexican officials had identified the four regional bands - Mimbreños, Gileños, Chiricaguis, and Mogolloneros. While all were a part of the larger Gila Apache community, Mexican records most often misrepresented the Gileño band as synonymous with the Gila Apache identity. The self-identified Gileño band leader and intermediary Juan José Compa, whom the Mexicans called "General," negotiated treaties in 1832, on behalf of 29 Apache leaders, which may have reinforced this conflation. At the same time, evidence shows continued agricultural practices in the Gila, Mimbres, Hatch, and Mesilla Valleys. In 1838, a treaty signed with Mexico reaffirmed boundaries for Gila Apache territory.

=== U.S. period (1848–present) ===
With the Treaty of Guadalupe Hidalgo (1848) and the Gadsden Purchase (1854), Gila Apache lands were divided between U.S. and Mexican jurisdictions. Conflict with U.S. settlers and the military increased after this period.

In 1852, a treaty was signed at Acoma, New Mexico, between Gila Apache representatives and the United States. A year later, a treaty with the Rio Mimbres and Rio Gila Apache was signed by some of the same families at Fort Webster. Two years later, they signed the Fort Thorn Treaty of 1855 which was concluded in the Hatch Valley. Contemporary records described these groups as multiple bands and sub-bands with homelands in the Black Range, the Mimbres, Hatch, and Mesilla Valleys, and into Janos, Chihuahua.

After broken treaty commitments and intensified campaigns, many Gila Apache were forced onto the Mescalero and San Carlos reservations and some were exiled by train to Florida, then moved to Alabama before Fort Sill, Oklahoma. Individuals like Bonsee, Frank (Francisco), and Massai evaded capture and lived outside of formal reservations evading deportation and later reconnecting with family on reservations.

Some families who remained in northern Mexico were identified in U.S. and Mexican records as "Bronco Apaches" or "Wild Ones." These terms are now regarded as derogatory; descendants instead identify as Gila Apache with a specific band or regional identifier (e.g., Mimbreño/a or Gileño/a). While some remained in Mexico, others reappeared in New Mexico and Texas before and after the release of Apache prisoners of war from Fort Sill, Oklahoma, in 1914. While considered related to the prisoners of war, Gila Apache acknowledge a separate political identity and backstory of staying home and negotiating settler colonialism. Despite dispossession due to settler encroachment, Gila Apache families maintained identity through kinship ties that linked them to Western Apache, Navajo, and Mescalero families.

== Culture ==
Gila Apache communities combined hunting, gathering, and farming with ceremonial and kinship practices shared across Apachean groups. Seasonal movements through the Gila, Mimbres, Mesilla Valley, Black Range, and Sierra Madre created connections through trade, intermarriage, and alliances with neighboring Pueblo, Athabaskan, and Spanish/Mexican populations.

Ceremonial traditions included song cycles, social dances, and rites of passage, which reinforced ties to both landscape and broader Apachean identity. Intertribal alliances, such as those with Manso and Suma neighbors in the seventeenth century, are also noted in the historical record.

In the present day, Gila Apache descendants continue ceremonial life and cultural preservation. Activities emphasize language, oral history, and gatherings, forming part of the broader effort to maintain continuity despite displacement and the absence of federal recognition.

== Education ==
Gila Apache descendants today live throughout New Mexico and the U.S.–Mexico borderlands. Elders play a central role in teaching cultural knowledge, oral history, and customs to younger generations, preserving language, kinship practices, and ceremonial life. Students from New Mexico pursue higher education at institutions across the state, while Gila Apache youth and community members also work to educate the public about their people’s ongoing presence.

From 2025 to 2027, the Branigan Cultural Center in Las Cruces is hosting an exhibit Land of the People, featuring the Gila Apache alongside other Indigenous groups of the region. The exhibit provides opportunities for schools and the wider community to learn about Gila Apache traditions, oral histories, and contemporary cultural preservation.

== Descendants ==
Gila Apache people are enrolled in the Fort Sill Apache Tribe of Oklahoma, Mescalero Apache Tribe of the Mescalero Reservation, and San Carlos Apache Tribe of the San Carlos Reservation today. The Chihene Nde Nation of New Mexico, which submitted a petition for federal recognition to the U.S. Bureau of Indian Affairs in 2024, identifies as descendants of the Gila Apache.
