= Amotomanco language =

Extinct and unclassified language

Amotomanco
- Otomoaco
- Native to: United States, Mexico
- Region: La Junta de los Rios
- Ethnicity: La Junta Indians (Otomoaco)
- Extinct: colonial period
- Language family: unclassified (Uto-Aztecan?)

Language codes
- ISO 639-3: None (mis)
- Glottolog: amot1239

Amotomanco is an extinct and poorly attested language of southern Texas and northern Mexico. Only 4 words are known.

== Vocabulary ==
Four words are known of Amotomanco, being abad 'water', teoy 'corn', ayaguate 'beans', and porba or payla 'copper'. A two-word expression, of which the meaning is unknown, was said to be sung in a dance, ayia canima.

== See also ==
- List of extinct Uto-Aztecan languages
