= Juan de Medrano y Mesía =

23th Spanish Governor of New Mexico
- In office 1668–1671
- Preceded by: Fernando de Villanueva
- Succeeded by: Juan Durán de Miranda

Juan de Medrano y Mesía was the governor of Santa Fe de Nuevo México between 1668 and 1771. During his term he had to send troops against the Apaches, who carried out various attacks against the Christian communities of New Mexico. This event was a fundamental fact of his administration in the province.

== Career ==
After being appointed governor of the province of Santa Fe de Nuevo México by Viceroy Antonio Sebastián de Toledo, succeeding Fernando de Villanueva, he took office in November 1668. During his government, important conflicts arose between the Apaches of various tribes (Gilas, Salineros, and the natives of “Casa Fuerte”) and the Christian communities (both of Spanish and indigenous origin). Thus, the Apaches, in alliance with the Navajos, attacked these communities, leading to the murder of a large number of people (including six Spanish soldiers and some three hundred and seventy-three Christianized Indians, according to estimates made by Mesía himself) and the theft of a large number of horses, mules and sheep (which Mesía estimates at more than 2,000 in the case of equines). In 1670 (and coinciding with the harvest season), the Apaches attacked Las Humanas región. They killed eleven people who lived there, stole church property and kidnapped thirty-one people. The Apache attacks contributed to the destruction of the populations of at least six towns in Piro and Salinas. These towns were affected by a combination of the attacks, famine, drought and disease.

The famine caused by Apache attacks in one of the missions caused the indigenous residents to steal food from the convents. To stop the attacks, Mesía promised to send a troop of fifty soldiers and six hundred indigenous people against the rebels. The indigenous members of the troop would be selected from among those who had assumed the Christian religion. The troop would depart from Jemez Pueblo. However, Mesía asked the clergy for help to carry out his mission. He asked Father Talabán for help in particular to provide food in the convents, such as wheat and corn. Talabán distributed them among a large number of convents, including those of Senecu, Socorro, Ácoma, Nambé, San Ildefonso and San Juan (the last three belonging to the Tewa people). The distribution of food among the convents not only alleviated the hunger of the parishioners but also prevented the priests from abandoning these religious buildings. In addition, convents in regions such as Galisteo, Sandía, and Zia received food from Pecos. A chaplain, two hundred sheep, and more than twenty cows were also sent to these regions. Mesías noted that thanks to these aids, there were still natives alive. Mesías left the government of Santa Fe in 1671, being replaced by Juan Durán de Miranda.

By 1673, Mesía was established in Mexico.
