= Penalosa =

Peñalosa or Penalosa is a surname. Notable people with the surname include:

- Diego de Peñalosa, (1690–?) Spanish governor of Cuba
- Gil Penalosa, (born 1956/57) Canadian urbanist and politician
- Dodie Boy Peñalosa (born 1962), Filipino boxer
- Enrique Peñalosa (born 1954), Colombian politician from Bogotá
- Francisco de Peñalosa (1470–1528), Spanish composer
- Gerry Peñalosa, Filipino boxer

== Other ==
- Penalosa, Kansas, city in Kingman County, Kansas, United States
