= Juan Sabeata =

Indian leader (c.1645–c.1692)

- Born: ca. 1645
- Died: ca. 1692
- Occupation: Native American leader

Juan Sabeata (c. 1645–c. 1692) was a Jumano Indian leader in present day Texas who tried to forge an alliance with the Spanish or French to help his people fend off the encroachments of the Apaches on their territory.

== Life ==
Sabeata (also written Xaviata) was born after 1640 at Las Humanas, the Tompiro Pueblo now called Gran Quivira. Sabeata later made his way to the city of Parral in northern Mexico. There, he was baptized a Catholic as an adult and given the Christian name of Juan. When he first came to prominence in 1683 he was a leader of the Jumano Indians and their allies. Sabeata apparently did not speak Spanish well as he communicated through an interpreter.

== Meeting with the Spanish ==
In 1683, the Spanish on the northern frontier were vulnerable. The Pueblo Revolt of 1680, led by Popay, resulted in more than 400 Spanish deaths and their expulsion from New Mexico. The 2,000 survivors retreated to El Paso, Texas. Thus, when a delegation of friendly Indians, headed by Sabeata, came to El Paso in October 1683 the Spanish were welcoming.

Sabeata said that he lived at La Junta, the junction of the Rio Grande and Conchos rivers near the present day town of Presidio, Texas. He said he had been sent by several Indian nations to request that the Spanish establish Christian missions in their territory. He also requested Spanish aid to the Jumanos and their allies against the depredations of the Apaches. The majority of his tribe, he explained, lived eastward from La Junta and were menaced by the Apache who lived nearby. Sabeata said that the Jumanos had good trade relations with 36 different tribes. Among those he named which can be identified are the Tejas, the Caddoan tribe that would give the state of Texas its name. Moreover, Sabeata mentioned that "other Spaniards"—meaning the French—were trading with the Tejas.

It was a masterful performance by Sabeata to excite Spanish interest in a potential harvest of souls among the Jumanos and their allies and to create Spanish concern about French encroachments on what they believed was Spanish territory. Sabeata went on to cement the interest of the Spanish by telling of a battle won by the Jumanos because of a cross that descended from heaven to protect them. He sent representatives to measure the church in El Paso, promising to build two similar churches at La Junta.

== The Dominguez de Mendoza expedition ==
In response to Sabeata's petition, three Spanish priests and a large delegation of Indians left El Paso for La Junta where they found that the seven or more tribes clustered there had in fact built churches and houses for the missionaries. The priests were followed by 20 Spanish soldiers led by Captain Juan Domínguez de Mendoza. On January 1, 1684 the soldiers reunited with the priests and with Sabeata and a large number of Indians the expedition left for the land of the Jumanos. It proved to be considerably more than six days away. On January 17, the expedition arrived at a settlement of the Cibolo Indians on the Pecos River, probably downstream from present day Pecos, Texas. Juan Sabeata had gone ahead to prepare the Indians to welcome the Spanish and they did so in grand style, firing several guns, including an arquebus fired by Sabeata himself—in violation of a Spanish prohibition against Indians owning guns.

Sabeata and the Indians then persuaded a reluctant Dominguez de Mendoza to assist them against the Apaches. The expedition, shepherded by large numbers of Indians, continued their march, now moving eastward toward the Concho River and sending out patrols to look for Apaches. It appears that they saw no Apaches in the flesh, but several horses were stolen during an Apache raid. One of the interesting things in the narrative is that the Jumano owned horses at this time—one of the earlier mentions in the Spanish records of mounted Indians in the United States.

Relations between Dominguez and Sabeata deteriorated. On February 19, he accused Sabeata of lying about the threat posed of the Apaches. At the same time Sabeata had probably become aware that the Spanish were more interested in bison hunting than fighting Apaches or spreading the gospel of Christianity. Sabeata departed the expedition along with some of the Jumano Indians, although many of the Indians remained with Dominguez. The Spanish and the remaining Indians continued their exploration eastward. Their route seems to have been down the Middle Fork of the Concho past the present day San Angelo, Texas to the Colorado River where they camped for almost two months to hunt bison. Their campsite may have been near present day Ballinger, Texas. During the expedition, the Spanish and their Indian colleagues killed 5,156 bison, the Spanish carefully preserving the skins to sell on their return to New Mexico. The priests baptized hundreds of Indians.

Sabeata's assessment of the threat of the Apaches was apparently accurate, as the Spanish camp was raided on several occasions. A Spanish soldier was wounded and two Indians were killed. Mendoza, however, in his written account accused Sabeata of plotting to kill the Spanish and stated that he was in ill repute with the Indians. However, the opposite would seem to have been true as a grand council of Indian tribes planned by the Spanish never took place. Most of the Indians who accompanied Mendoza seem to have departed and he feared an Apache attack. It was a much depleted group that broke camp in May and returned quickly to El Paso—along with thousands of valuable bison skins.

== Looking for an ally ==
With the failure of his effort to get the Spanish involved in a useful manner in contesting the Apache advances onto the southern Great Plains, Sabeata turned to the French. La Salle had just established a colony in eastern Texas and in 1686 a Jumano leader, probably Sabeata, met with the French, declared himself an enemy of the Spanish, and requested French assistance against the Apache. The failure of the La Salle mission precluded this request from being granted.

Sabeata's activities included trading. With contacts both in the Indian and Spanish world, he and the Jumanos were intermediaries, bringing Spanish goods to Indians in eastern Texas, and exchanging them for Indian products, mostly buffalo hides. There were well-organized trade fairs all over Texas which no doubt pre-dated the Spanish.

In 1688, the wide-ranging traveler was back at La Junta. He was appointed a governor of the Indians there by the Spanish, his altercations with Mendoza apparently forgotten. Juan de Retana was ordered to collect a force of 90 Spanish harquebusiers and Indian allies and expel the French from east Texas. Sabeata was ordered to collect the Indian allies and await the arrival of the Spanish force at La Junta. Retana was the commander of the presidio at San Francisco de Conchos near the headwaters of the Conchos River. On his march northward he decided to attack the Toboso people who were fighting against the Spanish primarily in reaction to slaving raids.

When Sabeata got the news that Retana was delayed, he decided to go contact the French on his own. departed La Junta, carried out his own reconnaissance, and was able to report to Retana that the French settlement in eastern Texas had been destroyed by Indians and most of the French killed, only eight or nine survivors living among the Tejas. Four or five of the Frenchmen requested to go with Sabeata to the Spanish settlements, and they went with him for three days. However they decided the group might be attacked by Coahuiltecans, and lacking the courage of Sabeata, they turned back. They did give Sabeata two pages torn from their books and a parchment painting of a ship to show the Spanish they were really French.

Sabeata appears again in the Spanish records in 1690 when a Spanish priest working in newly established Spanish mission among the Hasinai (Caddo) in east Texas asked him to carry a letter to Spanish authorities in El Paso and a year later he carried two more letters to the Governor of Coahuila. The letters requested that soldiers be assigned to the missions to protect them from the French.

It appears that Sabeata, the Jumanos, and other Indian tribes now spent the winters living on the Rio Grande near Eagle Pass, Texas and summers hunting buffalo in the Texas Hill Country near the Guadalupe River, apparently pushed out of their homeland along the Concho River further north. Sabeata also apparently made frequent visits to Spanish authorities in El Paso and Parral.

In 1691, a Spanish expedition visited an encampment, estimated to number 3,000, of Jumanos and other tribes on the Guadalupe River. Sabeata organized a welcome that included a procession featuring a wooden cross (presumably the same that had descended from Heaven to assist the Jumanos in a battle with the Apaches a decade earlier). The chief of the Cibola tribe and his people displayed an image of the Our Lady of Guadalupe and the chef of the Catqueasa, who spoke good Spanish, kissed the hand of the Priest in Catholic fashion. It was "a splendid show of piety and devotion" and Sabeata followed up with a request once again that a Spanish mission be established among his people. The Spanish demurred saying the Jumano visited Spanish settlements yearly and had no need of missions among them. The Spanish detected an undercurrent of hostility among the Indians and declined to remain encamped with them.

In 1692, Sabeata organized a campaign against the Chisos Indians who had attacked the Indians at La Junta. This is the last notice of him in the Spanish records. He may have died or been killed in 1692 or 1693.

== Importance ==
Sabeata is one of the few Indians who emerges from the myopic Spanish records as an individual. His appeals to the Spanish (and the French) to protect the Jumanos from their enemies failed. He lived at a time when the Spanish were weak and in retreat on their northern frontier and had few resources to extend their control beyond a few towns.

Much of what we know about the Texas Indians during this time comes from Sabeata filtered through the lens of the Spanish. He is known to have crisscrossed Texas on at least eight occasions and to have made numerous visits to El Paso, Parral, and other Spanish settlements in Texas and Mexico. He was accepted not only as a leader of the Jumanos, but also as a spokesman for the numerous Tonkawa, Caddoan, and Coahuiltecan bands and tribes that inhabited southern and central Texas. With the disappearance of Sabeata from the historical record in 1692, the Jumanos also soon disappeared. In 1716, the Jumanos again appear in the Spanish records, but as allies of the former enemies, the Apaches, and in 1771 comes the last mention of them as an independent people.
