= Santa Bárbara, Chihuahua =

City in the Mexican state of Chihuahua

Santa Bárbara
- City
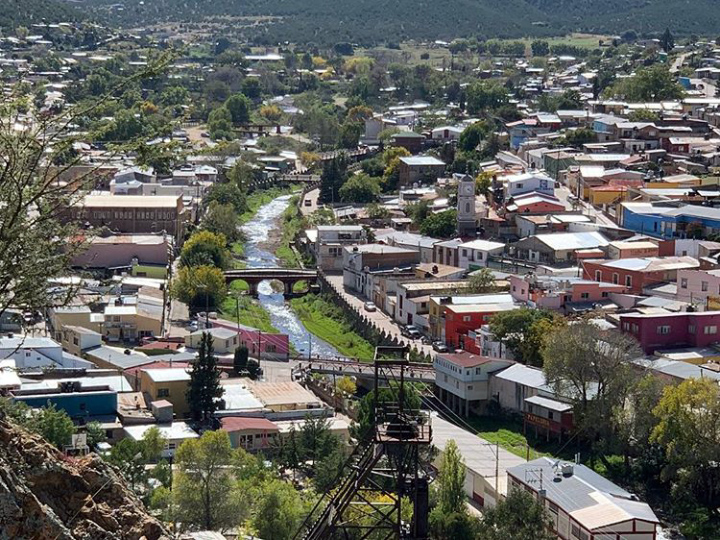

- Location within Chihuahua Location within Mexico
- Coordinates: 26°48′48″N 105°49′13″W
- Country: Mexico
- State: Chihuahua
- Municipality: Santa Bárbara
- Established: 1567
- Named for: Saint Barbara

Government
  - Federal electoral district: Chihuahua's 9th

Population (2020)
  - Total: 9,169
- Time zone: UTC-6 (Zona Centro)
- Website: santabarbarachih.gob.mx

Santa Bárbara is a city and seat of the municipality of Santa Bárbara, in the northern Mexican state of Chihuahua. As of 2010, the city of Santa Bárbara had a population of 8,765, up from 8,673 as of 2005.

== History ==
Santa Bárbara was established in 1567 by Spanish conquistador Rodrigo del Río de Losa during the rule of Francisco de Ibarra, governor of the state of Nueva Vizcaya, New Spain. The native peoples in the region when the Spanish arrived were the Conchos people who according to Spanish records lived on a diet consisting of mainly roots and prickly pears. The Spanish were attracted to the region by discoveries of silver and Santa Bárbara grew from a population of 30 in 1575 to 7,000 in 1600. It was the northernmost outpost of New Spain in the 16th century. Santa Bárbara became a wealthy frontier town of slavers, ranchers, miners, adventurers, and priests.

Santa Bárbara is located on a tributary of the Conchos River and was the jumping off spot for several expeditions to New Mexico including Chamuscado and Rodríguez in 1581–1582, Antonio de Espejo in 1582–1583, and Juan de Oñate in 1598.

On 17 December 1930, the town was designated a city by an act of the legislature. Today, Santa Bárbara is overshadowed by nearby Parral but the extensive mine tailings tell of its former prominence.

== Economy ==
The municipality produces wood products and nuts from trees such as walnuts, mesquite, junipers, gatuños, willows and madroños. Fruits grown in the region are peach, pear and apple. These products are being sold worldwide. The city also continues to rely on mining of lead, silver, gold, zinc, fluorite and other minerals. Lead is now the most important mineral produced in this city. The mines collectively occupy 7,180 hectares of the municipality.

== Tourist attractions ==
Tourists visit caves, mountain ranges, and other natural attraction in the region. The caves have ancient paintings on the cave walls made by early indigenous people who resided here long before the arrival of the Spaniards.
