= Baltasar Obregón =

Spanish explorer and historian

Baltasar Obregón (born 1534) was a 16th-century Spanish explorer and historian. He is most notable for publishing the Historia de los descubrimientos antiguos y modernos de la Nueva España, an account of his travels in the New World.

== Biography ==
Obregón was born the son of an encomendera in the Spanish colony of New Spain. At the age of 19 Obregón joined up with a Spanish expedition to California, from which he returned with travel experience. In 1554 at the age of 20 he joined the expedition of Francisco de Ibarra to explore the frontiers of Spanish territory and to secure mineral resources. The expedition was a success, founding several settlements and allowing the Spanish to colonize Zacatecas. Later in life Obregón published an account of his travels, the Historia de los descubrimientos de Nueva Espana, in which he described the landscape of northern Mexico. After cataloging his own life, he continued to publish the accounts of other Spanish expeditions, such as that of Antonio de Espejo.

== Bibliography ==
- Carte, Rebecca A. (2015-10-22). Capturing the Landscape of New Spain: Baltasar Obregón and the 1564 Ibarra Expedition. University of Arizona Press. ISBN 9780816532247.
