= Santa Bárbara Municipality =

Municipality in the Mexican state of Chihuahua

Santa Bárbara
- Municipality
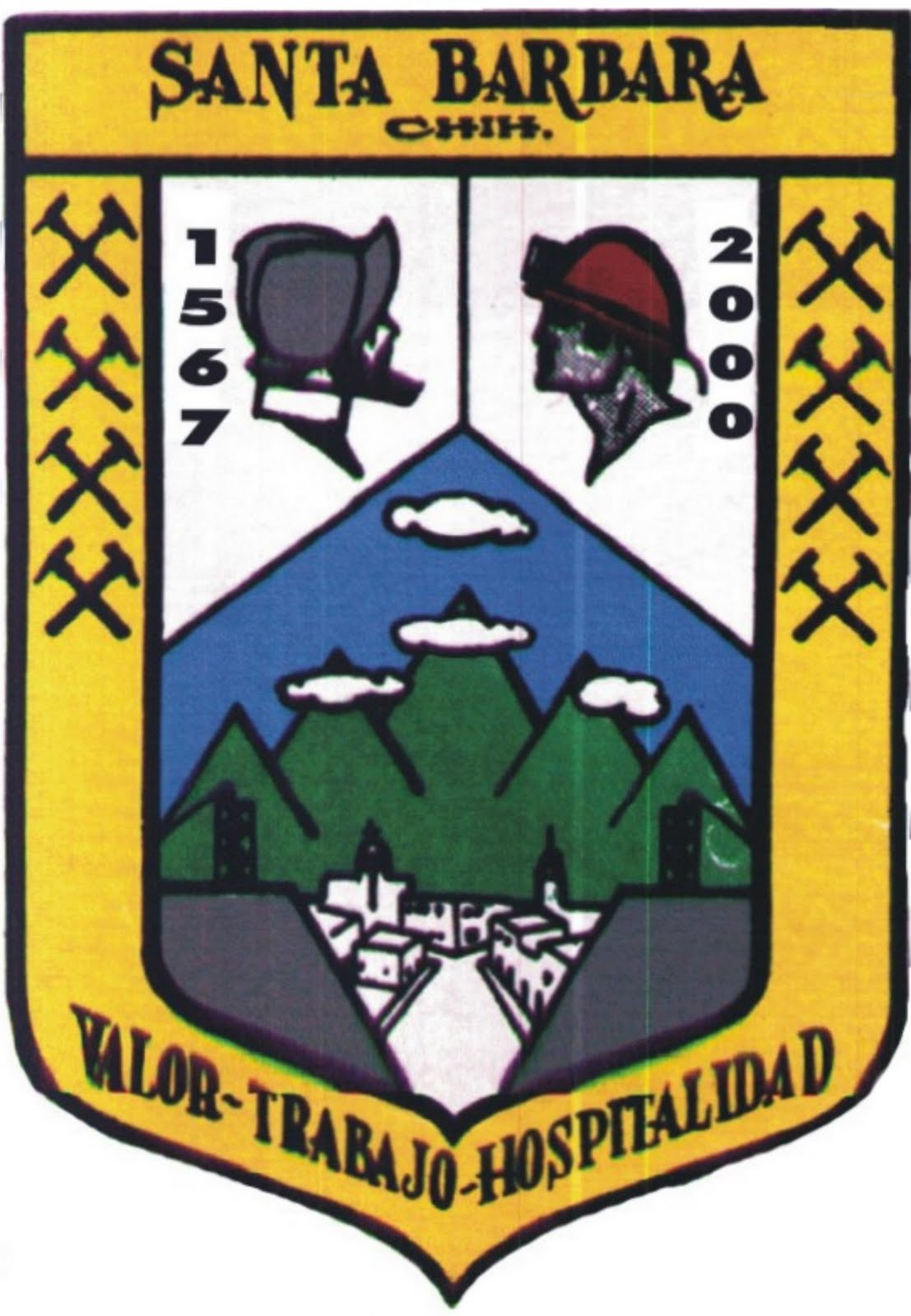
- Coat of arms

- Municipality of Santa Bárbara in Chihuahua

- Location in Mexico
- Coordinates: 26°48′N 105°49′W
- Country: Mexico
- State: Chihuahua
- Municipal seat: Santa Bárbara
- Named for: Saint Barbara

Area
  - Total: 424.2 km^{2} (163.8 sq mi)

Population (2020)
  - Total: 11,582
  - Density: 27.30/km^{2} (70.71/sq mi)

Santa Bárbara is one of the 67 municipalities of Chihuahua, in northern Mexico. The municipal seat lies at Santa Bárbara. The municipality, one of the smallest in Chihuahua, covers an area of 424.2 km^{2}.

As of 2010, the municipality had a total population of 10,427, up from 10,120 as of 2005.

As of 2010, the city of Santa Bárbara had a population of 8,765. Other than the city of Santa Bárbara, the municipality had 105 localities, none of which had a population over 1,000.

== Geography ==
=== Towns and villages ===
The municipality has 53 localities. The largest are:

| Name | Population (2005) |
|---|---|
| Santa Bárbara | 8,673 |
| Punto Alegre | 374 |
| Corral de Piedras | 334 |
| Total Municipality | 10,120 |
