= Francisco de Ibarra =

Spanish explorer (1539–1575)

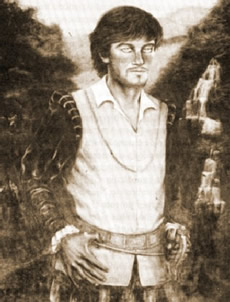
Francisco de Ibarra

Francisco de Ibarra (1539 –June 3, 1575) was a Spanish-Basque explorer, founder of the city of Durango, and governor of the Spanish province of Nueva Vizcaya, in present-day Durango and Chihuahua.

== Biography ==
Francisco de Ibarra was born about 1534 in Eibar, Gipuzkoa, in the Basque Country of Spain. He went to Mexico as a young man, and upon the recommendation and financing of his uncle, conquistador and wealthy mine owner Diego de Ibarra, Francisco was placed at the head of an expedition to explore northwest from Zacatecas in 1554. The young Ibarra noted silver in the vicinity of present-day Fresnillo, but passed it by. He explored further and founded towns at San Martín and Avino, where the silver mines made him a mine owner in his own right. Ibarra's expedition to Zacatecas was later documented by Spanish historian Baltasar Obregón, who traveled with Ibarra in 1554.

In 1562, Ibarra headed another expedition to push farther into northwest Mexico. In particular, he was searching for the fabled golden city of Copala. He did not find the mythical treasure, but explored and conquered what is now the Mexican state of Durango. Ibarra was appointed governor of the newly formed province of Nueva Vizcaya (New Biscay) in 1562, and the following year he founded the city of Durango to be its capital.

In 1564, Ibarra, following rumors of rich mineral deposits, crossed the Sierra Madre Occidental to conquer what is now southern Sinaloa. Prospectors discovered silver veins in the new territory, and in 1565, de Ibarra founded the towns of Copala and es:Pánuco (Sinaloa).

Soldiers under Ibarra's direction explored north from Durango in 1567, and founded the town of Santa Bárbara in present-day Chihuahua to mine the silver they found there.

Francisco de Ibarra died on 3 June 1575 in Pánuco, Sinaloa, one of the silver-mining cities that he founded.
