= Julimes people =

Former Indigenous tribe in North America

The Julimes (Note: Alternate spellings include: Xulimes, Hulimes, Geulimes, Chulimes, Jeulime.) people were a Native American people in the region of present-day Texas. They may have spoken a Concho or Jumano language.

Early Spanish explorers, including Juan Domínguez de Mendoza, recorded Julimes living around La Junta de los Rios in the mid-17th century. Over the next hundred years, the Julimes migrated south along the Rio Conchos, towards present-day Julimes, Chihuahua.

In 1890, archaeologist Adolph Bandelier reported that the Julimes were extinct.
