= Otomoaco =

Extinct Indigenous people of Texas, U.S., and Chihuahua, Mexico

Tomoacas
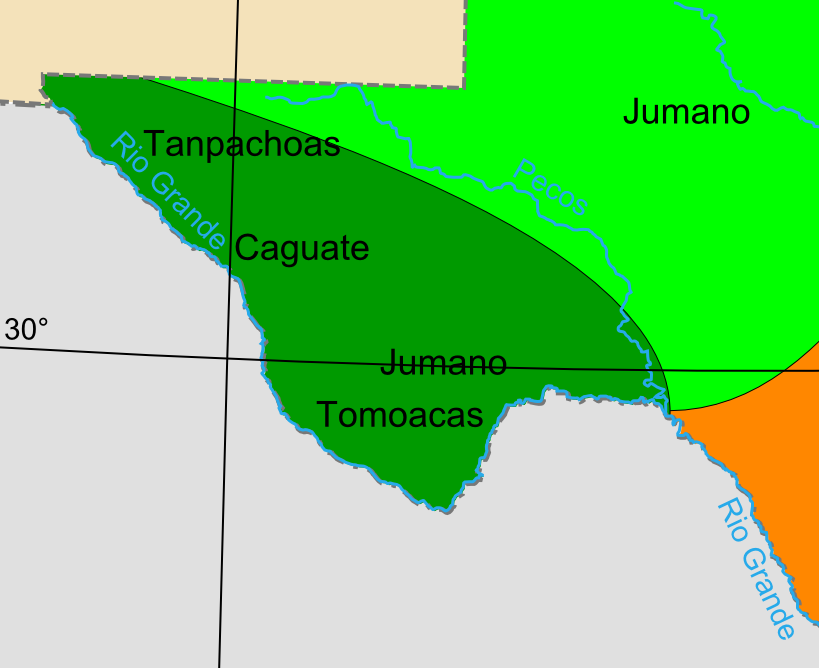
- Tomoaca territory in Texas, circa 1500 CE

Total population
- Extinct

Regions with significant populations
- Southwestern Texas, USA (La Junta de los Ríos, Big Bend area), and Chihuahua, Mexico

Languages
- Amotomanco language

Religion
- Indigenous religions (unspecified)

Related ethnic groups
- Jumanos, other La Junta Indians

The Otomoaco were an Indigenous people of the Americas who lived in present-day Southwest Texas and Chihuahua, Mexico. They lived in the Big Bend region, La Junta de los Ríos, and Río Conchos, part of the Aridoamerica cultural region.

The Otomoaco are believed to have been affiliated with the Jumanos.

== Name ==
The Otomoaco were also known as the Tomoacas, Amotomancos, Omotomoacos, Otomacos, Conchos, and Patarabueyes. Patarabuey was a pejorative Spanish term that translated as "ox kicker".

== Territory ==
In the 16th century, the Otomoaco and Jumanos were primary tribes in the area of Southwestern Texas that is now Big Bend Ranch State Park. They also lived along the Rio Grande and the Río Conchos in Chihuahua, Mexico.

== European contact ==
In 1583, early Spanish explorers (including Antonio de Espejo) encountered the Otomoaco at La Junta de los Ríos, a regional hub of Indigenous settlement and agriculture. Spanish chroniclers described the Tomoacas as wearing only well-tanned buffalo hides for clothing, and as skilled bow-and-arrow hunters of the buffalo.

== Language ==
They spoke the Amotomanco language, which is poorly attested but likely was a Uto-Aztecan language.
