= Tomé Domínguez de Mendoza =

20th Spanish Governor of New Mexico (Acting)
- In office 1664–1664
- Preceded by: Diego Dionisio de Peñalosa Briceño y Berdugo
- Succeeded by: Juan Durán de Miranda

Personal details
- Born: 1623 Mexico City, New Spain
- Died: 1681 (aged 57–58) unknown
- Profession: Soldier and administrator (Governor of New Mexico)

Tomé Domínguez de Mendoza (1623 – after 1692) was a Mexican-born Spanish general, field marshal and 20th Colonial Spanish Governor of New Mexico.

== Biography ==
Tomé Domínguez de Mendoza was born in Mexico City, into an ancient and noble family, the son of Tomé Domínguez, the elder, and Elena de la Cruz, also known as Elena Ramírez de Mendoza. The younger Tomé was baptized on February 19, 1623, in Mexico City. His father, the elder Tomé Domínguez, was a Spanish officer and former wine merchant who lived in Mexico City for a time before emigrating to New Mexico with his wife and at least 7 children.

Prior to emigrating north to New Mexico, the elder Tomé requested proof of his wife's noble lineage. On August 8, 1625, when the younger Tomé was just two years old, his parents Tomé Domínguez, "merchant [and] citizen of the City of Mexico," and his mother, Elena de la Cruz, gave power of attorney to Francisco Franco authorizing him to go to Vera Cruz to obtain legal proof of the lineage of Elena de la Cruz. Between, August 30-September 10, a formal inquiry was made in the usual form. Six witnesses were examined who testified:

1. that Elena de la Cruz was the daughter of Benito París and Leonor Francisca (de Mendoza), deceased citizens of Vera Cruz
2. that her paternal grandparents were Juan Gonzales and Isabel Gallega, former residents of Vera Cruz
3. that her maternal grandparents were Francisco de Mendoza and Leonor de Grimaldos, citizens of Puerto de Santa María in Spain
4. and that the said parents and grandparents were "old Christians," without mixture of blood with Moors, Jews, conversos, or persons who had been tried and punished by the Holy Office of the Inquisition.

Following in the footsteps of his father, the younger Tomé joined the Spanish Army. By 1656, the younger Tomé held the position of alcalde mayor and Lieutenant General of the Rio Abajo region. Sometime after 1659, Tomé was promoted to the rank of sargento mayor of the Spanish army.

By 1662 Tomé held several key positions in the New Mexico government, including Lieutenant General, perpetual regidor and treasurer of the Santa Cruzada.

In 1663 he led a faction against the sitting colonial governor of New Mexico Juan Durán de Miranda accusing him of "grave charges," which led to a brief imprisonment for Durán de Miranda and the seizure of all his goods.

Following the arrest of Durán de Miranda, Tomé Domínguez de Mendoza was appointed the new Colonial Governor of New Mexico in 1664. However, his government only lasted until Durán de Miranda was released from prison, after presenting satisfactory arguments rebutting the charges issued against him. The following year Durán de Miranda successfully recovered his government and deposed Tomé Domínguez de Mendoza as Colonial Governor.

In 1676, Tomé was again appointed Lieutenant Governor of the province by Juan Francisco Treviño. In June of that same year, Tome formed an army against the Apaches who were attacking Socorro and Senecú. In 1677 and 1680, he joined the cabildo of Santa Fe, the capital of New Mexico. During his final decade, Tomé continued to participate in political and military functions throughout the province of New Mexico.

In August 1680, Tomé and his family moved to El Paso del Norte (Ciudad Juarez, in modern Mexico), along with other residents of Rio Abajo, New Mexico. There, he held several positions, including maestre de campo "with full complement of arms."

In 1681, Tomé Domínguez de Mendoza, at sixty-one years old, died from gout and a stomach disease.

== Personal life ==
Tomé Domínguez de Mendoza married twice. His first marriage was to Catalina López Mederos, with whom he had 6 children: Tome III, Antonio, Juana and Francisco, all of whom died in the war against the indigenous Pueblo Native Americans; and Juan and Diego, who were both injured with poisoned arrows in the same war. His second wife was Ana Velásquez, with whom he had two additional children: José and Juana Domínguez.

About 1659, Governor Bernardo López de Mendizábal gave Tomé Domínguez de Mendoza an encomienda to the south of Isleta. When the encomienda passed into his hands, so too did the Native American population who resided there. Tomé took advantage of this to Christianize them and make them work for him as a way of "partial compensation" for the debts he owed to the Spanish Crown for several services that the crown provided.

In Isleta, the Domínguez de Mendoza family settled to the west of El Cerro de Tomé, near Tomé Hill (next to Rio Grande). However, when the Pueblo Revolt broke out in 1680, thirty-eight members of the Dominguez family were attacked and killed by the Pueblo Native Americans.

For the most part, those who survived the Pueblo Revolt were forced to leave, emigrating south to El Paso del Norte (modern Ciudad Juarez, North of modern Mexico). So, in 1682, Don Pedro de Tomé y Chaves (brother of the first wife of Tomé, Catalina López Mederos) got permission to emigrate to modern-day Mexico with his family and the family of Tomé Domínguez de Mendoza.

== Legacy ==
The village of Tomé was built in the place where he resided, after being named as Tomé Domínguez de Mendoza.
