= Chamuscado and Rodríguez Expedition =

The Chamuscado and Rodríguez Expedition visited the land on what became present day New Mexico in 1581–1582. The expedition was led by Francisco Sánchez, called "El Chamuscado," and Fray Agustín Rodríguez, the first Spaniards known to have visited the Pueblo Indians since Francisco Vásquez de Coronado 40 years earlier.

== Background ==
Fray Agustín Rodríguez, stationed near the mining town of Santa Barbara, Chihuahua, the northernmost outpost of New Spain, organized the expedition. In 1579, Rodríguez became interested when an Indian told him of settlements to the north in which the Indians grew cotton and wove cloth. To the Spanish this meant that the Indians were civilized beings who might be made Christian. Rodríguez got permission from Spanish authorities "for the purpose of preaching the Holy Gospel." Rodríguez apparently had little familiarity with Coronado's expedition but had read the account of Cabeza de Vaca.

The expedition left Santa Barbara on June 5, 1581. The appointed leader was Captain Francisco "El Chamuscado" Sánchez. Chamuscado was Spanish for "scorched" so-called because of Sánchez's flaming red beard. The expedition included nine Spanish soldiers, three Catholic clerics, including Rodriguez, and 19 Indian servants, including two women. The soldiers were well armed and mounted; the expedition took along ninety horses and 600 sheep, goats, cattle and pigs. The expedition was also authorized to explore the country for valuable minerals.

== The route and the Indians ==
The expedition proceeded down the Conchos River to its junction with the Rio Grande. Along more than one hundred miles of the Conchos River lived the Concho and Raya Indians who spoke the same language and were "naked and lived on roots and other things." Downriver, occupying 40 miles of the river banks were the Cabris or Pasaguantes, also "naked" but speaking a different language and cultivating squash and beans in addition to gathering wild plants. They were described as "very handsome."

Near La Junta, the junction of the Conchos River and the Rio Grande, Chamuscado and Rodríguez found several groups of Indians. At the junction and south were the Abraidres; northward were the Patarabueyes and Otomoacos or Amotomancos. They were friendly, the men described as "handsome" and the women "beautiful". They lived in wattled houses and grew squash and beans, but the Spanish considered them "naked and barbarous people." (See La Junta Indians) Northwards, near present-day El Paso lived the Caguates. They lived in mud brick houses and, while growing corn and beans, they also journeyed to the Great Plains to hunt buffalo and ate fish caught in the river. The explorers estimated that the Indians between La Junta and El Paso numbered about 10,000. The Indians directed the Spanish to follow the Rio Grande upstream to where they would find "houses two stories high and of good appearance, built of mud walls and white inside, the people being dressed in cotton." Scholars debate which of these various tribes, if any, were the people later known as Jumanos.

== The Pueblo Indians ==
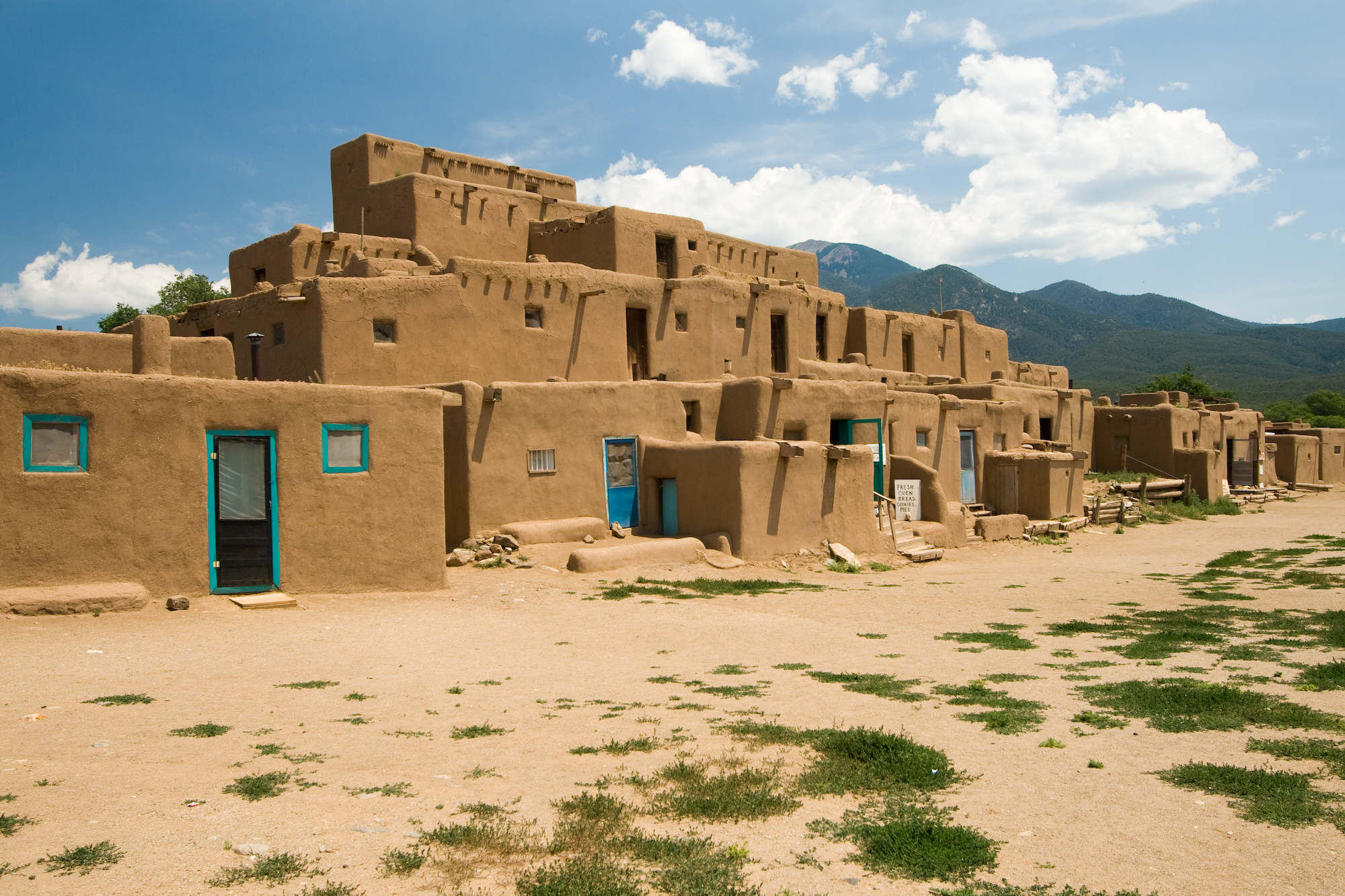
Taos Pueblo today is probably similar to the many Pueblo towns the expedition encountered near the Rio Grande.

After many days of following the Rio Grande through unoccupied territory, the expedition reached the first village of Pueblo Indians south of Socorro, New Mexico, near the future site of Fort Craig, and continued up the Rio Grande passing through many large and prosperous Pueblo villages. North of Albuquerque they left the Rio Grande and journeyed eastward to the largest of the pueblos at Pecos. It had 400 to 500 houses and rose to four or five stories—indicating a population of perhaps 3,000. The Spaniards described the Pueblo Indians as "handsome and fair-skinned and some of the women had "light hair". Coronado's army may have left its seed behind. They grew corn, beans, and squash and kept turkeys and, all in all, the Spanish were impressed with them and their manner of living.

On September 10, 1581, one of the three Catholic friars, Juan de Santa Maria, decided to return to Mexico. Reluctantly, Chamuscado acceded to his desire and he departed.

The soldiers ventured eastward onto the Great Plains in search of buffalo. On the Pecos River near Santa Rosa they encountered a rancheria of Querecho Indians. Four hundred men armed with bows and arrows came out to meet them, but Rodríguez calmed them. The Spanish described them as "naked"—uncivilized—people who hunted the buffalo. A short distance further east they found the buffalo in many herds of 200 to 300 and killed about 40 of them and made jerky. The Querechos were the people who would later be called Apaches.

Returning to the Rio Grande Valley they journeyed west to Acoma Pueblo and Zuni but were stopped by winter snows from continuing on to the Hopi pueblos. Then, they ventured east again to visit several pueblos in the salinas east of the Manzano Mountains.

The chroniclers of the expedition did not note any influence of the Coronado expedition on the Pueblos who apparently had not adopted any Spanish customs nor had they preserved any of the horses or other livestock left behind by Coronado. They had, moreover, apparently recovered in numbers from the disastrous levies on their resources that Coronado had imposed., Chamuscado and Rodríguez with their slight numbers made fewer demands on the Pueblos, although they had one altercation after Indians killed three Spanish horses.

Chamuscado and Rodríguez visited 61 Pueblo towns along the Rio Grande and its tributaries and counted a total of 7,003 houses of one or more stories in the pueblos. If all houses were occupied and if a later estimate of eight persons per house is accurate, the population of the towns visited may have been 56,000 people. In addition, they heard of other pueblos, including the Hopi which they were unable to visit.

== The return ==
The Spanish learned that Fray Juan had been killed by Indians only two or three days after leaving the expedition. Despite the killing of Juan, the two remaining friars were determined to stay in New Mexico. The soldiers left them, most of their supplies, and several Indian servants behind in the Tiwa town of Puaray and departed to return to Santa Barbara on January 31, 1582. During their return journey, Chamuscado, almost 70 years of age, died at El Xacal, near Julimes, Chihuahua. The eight remaining soldiers arrived in Santa Barbara on April 15, 1582.

The two friars and their Indian servants left behind were also soon stabbed by the Indians although two Indians escaped and returned to Mexico to tell the story. The Chamuscado and Rodríguez expedition was a modest affair, but revived Spanish interest in New Mexico leading to the establishment of Spanish New Mexico a few years later by Juan de Oñate.
