= La Junta Indians =

Indigenous people from present-day Texas and Northern Mexico

Total population
- ceased to exist as distinct peoples in the 17th century

Regions with significant populations
- Confluence of Rio Grande and the Conchos River in West Texas and Northern Mexico

Languages
- unattested

Religion
- Indigenous religion, Catholicism

Related ethnic groups
- likely Mogollon peoples

La Junta Indians is a collective name for the various Indians living in the area known as La Junta de los Ríos ("the confluence of the rivers": the Rio Grande and the Conchos River) on the borders of present-day West Texas and Northern Mexico. In 1535, Spanish explorer Alvar Nunez Cabeza de Vaca recorded visiting these peoples while making his way to a Spanish settlement. They cultivated crops in the river floodplains, as well as gathering local plants and catching fish from the rivers. They were part of an extensive trading network in the region. As a crossroads, the area attracted people of different tribes.

In the 18th century, the Spanish set up missions in the area, and the Native Americans gradually lost their tribal identifications. After suffering severe population losses through infectious disease, the Spanish slave trade, and attacks by raiding Apache and Comanche, the La Junta Indian communities disappeared. Some intermarried with Spanish soldiers and their descendants became part of the Mestizo population of Mexico; others merged with the Apache and Comanche; still others departed to work on Spanish haciendas and in silver mines.

== Territory ==
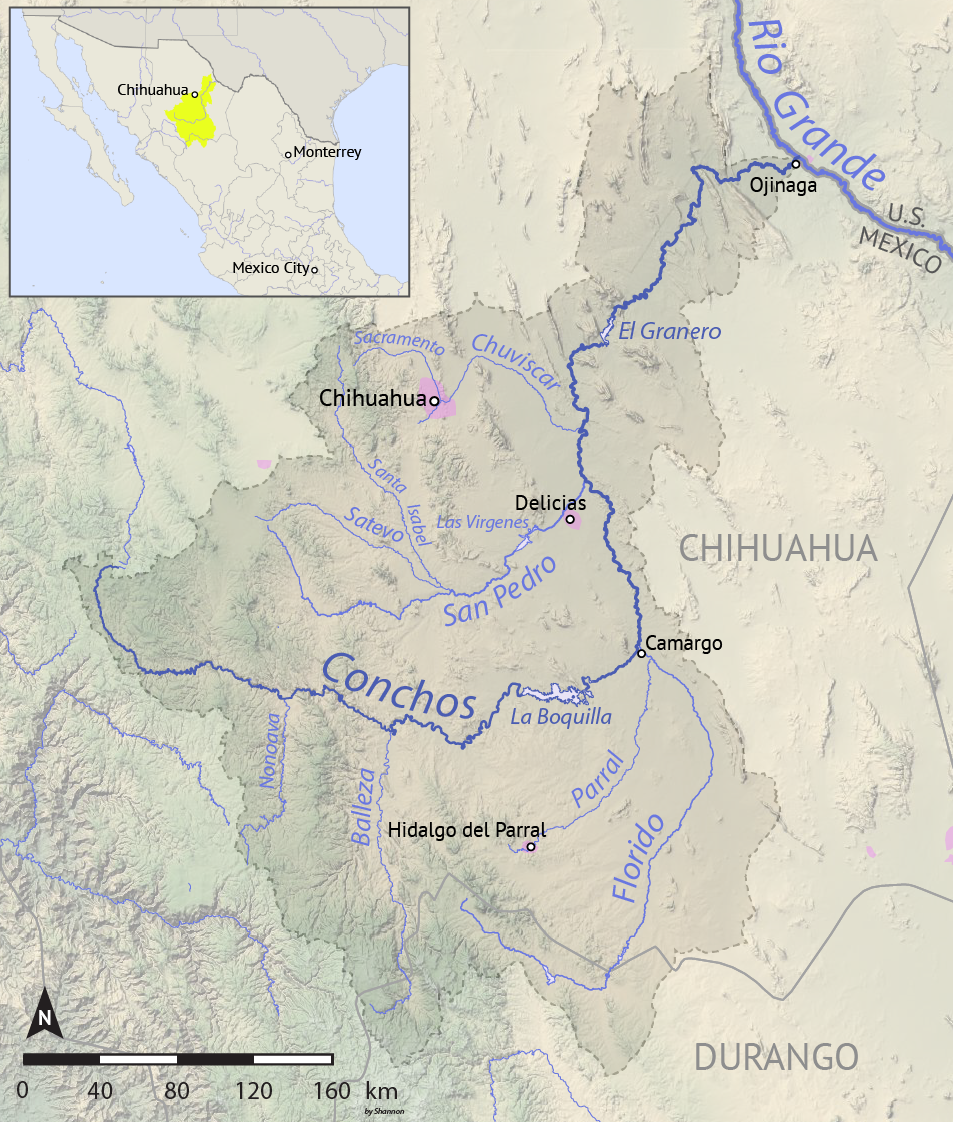
La Junta is located at the confluence of the Conchos River and the Rio Grande. The Conchos River is the larger of the two.

The Rio Grande and the Conchos River unite near the present-day cities of Presidio, Texas, and Ojinaga, Mexico. The Conchos is more than twice as large as the Rio Grande, but below the confluence the river is known as the Rio Grande. The area was named La Junta by Spanish explorers for the confluence, or junction, of rivers. A mile-wide floodplain extends from La Junta 35 miles upstream to Ruidosa and 18 miles downstream to Redford on the Rio Grande. It extends up the Rio Conchos 30 miles to Cuchillo Parado. The floodplain supports a thick growth of reeds, mesquite, willows, and groves of cottonwood trees.

Two terraces rise 20 and 60 feet above the floodplain. Only desert vegetation grows on the terraces. The La Junta Indians lived on the terraces and used the floodplain for agriculture, fishing, hunting, and gathering wild foods. Rugged mountains ring the river valley and terraces.

La Junta is near the center of the Chihuahua Desert and receives an average of 10.8 inches (270 mm) of precipitation annually. Lengthy droughts are common. Summers are very hot and winters are mild, although freezes are frequent.

== Precontact times ==
The abundant water, plant, and animal life attracted Indigenous peoples to the La Junta region for thousands of years. Settled village life, with agriculture supplementing traditional hunting and gathering, began by AD 1200. Archaeologists suggest that La Junta was settled as an expansion southeastward of the Jornada Mogollon culture and people who lived around present-day El Paso, Texas, 200 miles up the Rio Grande. It may also have been influenced by Casas Grandes, a notable precontact Indian civilization of the late 14th century located 200 miles west in present-day Mexico. Its people built complex communities with multistory buildings and used highly developed irrigation systems to support agriculture.

Based on recent research of architectural styles and mortuary practices, scholars believe that the people of La Junta may have been indigenous to the area. Between 1450 and 1500 many of the Jornada Mogollon settlements in western Texas were abandoned, possibly because of drought that made agriculture infeasible. The inhabitants possibly reverted to a hunter-gatherer culture that has left few traces in the archaeological record. The settlements at La Junta apparently survived the drought, although changes in the types of dwellings occurred and distinctive, locally produced pottery became common—or more common.

The architectural styles of the houses and mortuary practices differ from the Mogollon. Most of the pottery at La Junta from precontact times is Jornada Mogollon. In precontact times, La Junta communities imported much of their pottery from places such as Casas Grandes, southern New Mexico, and southern Arizona. El Paso Polychrome was a common locally made style of pottery from circa 1200 to 1450. It was brown earthenware painted with black, brown, and rep slips.

La Junta people continued to depend on hunting and gathering even after they became settled villagers and adopted agriculture. Archaeologists were surprised to learn that local people received less than 25 percent of their subsistence from maize; the majority came from game and wild foods. This contrasted with typical agricultural cultures in which people received the majority of nutrition from cultivated crops.

Little of their language, or languages, was recorded; scholars have not agreed on the language of the La Junta people. The most common guess is that they spoke Uto-Aztecan, but Kiowa–Tanoan and Southern Athabascan (Apache) have also been suggested. As the La Junta people lived at a crossroads in the desert, they may have been different ethnic groups who spoke multiple languages. For instance, the nomadic Jumano were frequent visitors and trading partners; they may also have been part-time residents of the area and were known to be ethnically distinct from the full-time villagers.

Given the limited amount of land suitable for agriculture and the austere environment, scholars estimate a population of 3,000 or 4,000 people at La Junta. But, the Spanish explorer Antonio de Espejo estimated the area's population at more than 10,000. The modern scholar Howard G. Applegate has calculated that the resources were sufficient to support such a population, but others disagree. The population during the year probably varied, as many of the Indians were semi-nomadic. The Spanish referred to the various peoples at La Junta as Amotomancos, Otomoacos, Abriaches, Julimes, and Patarabueyes. They were sometimes collectively called Jumano, although that name may more properly apply to the nomadic buffalo hunters who also frequented La Junta.

== 16th century ==
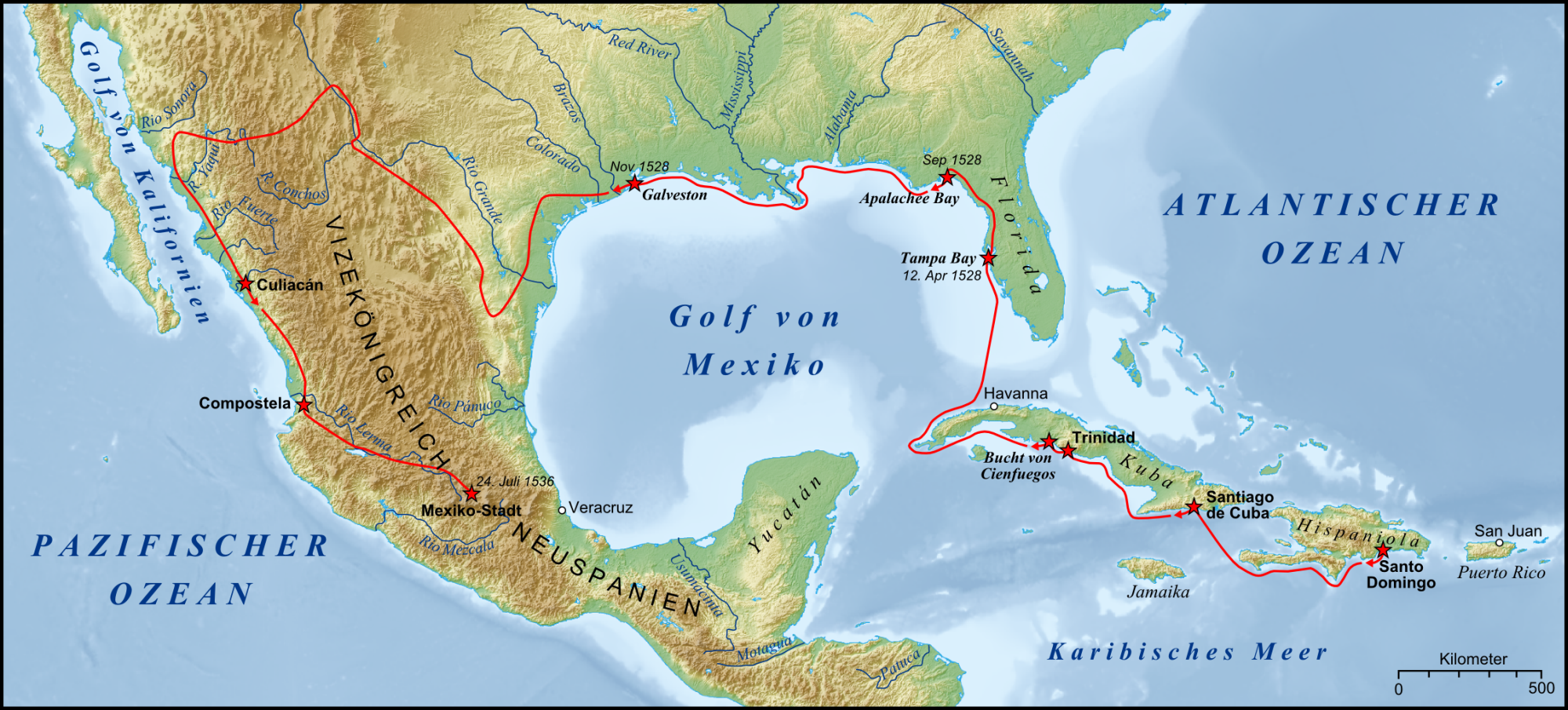
Cabeza de Vaca's route. La Junta is the area of the confluence of the Conchos River and the Rio Grande.

By 1500, La Junta people made a distinct style of pottery which archaeologists named La Junta ware.

The Spanish castaway Alvar Nunez Cabeza de Vaca probably passed through or near La Junta in 1535 on his way to a Spanish settlement. He reported encountering "the people of the cows" and said they were "people with the best bodies that we saw and the greatest liveliness." These were likely the Jumano, bison-hunting Indians who lived further north and east along the Pecos and Concho rivers, and traded and wintered in the La Junta region. Cabeza de Vaca described the area as well populated and agricultural, although with little good land. The Indians had not planted corn for the previous two years because of drought. Cabeza De Vaca noted that they put hot stones in gourds to cook their food. The Jumanos were not described as using pottery; like other nomadic peoples, they found it too heavy to be easily carried. (The Indians did not adopt horses from the Spanish until the 17th century.)

In the 1580s, two small Spanish expeditions, that of Chamuscado and Rodriguez and later Antonio de Espejo, passed through La Junta. They reported that the men were "handsome" and the women "beautiful," although "naked and barbarous people." The Indians lived in low, flat-roofed houses; grew corn, squash and beans; and hunted and fished along the river. They gave the Spaniards well-tanned deer and buffalo skins. The expeditions' descriptions of La Junta indicated a more settled agricultural people than those described 50 years earlier by Cabeza de Vaca.

They wrote that the houses at La Junta resembled

those of the Mexicans ... The natives built them square. They put up forked posts and in those they place rounded timbers the thickness of a man's thigh. Then they add stakes and plaster them with mud. Close to the houses they have granaries built of willow ... where they keep their provisions and harvest of mesquite and other things.

This type of house is called a jacal. The floors of the houses were usually dug about 18 inches below ground level, which helped protect against temperature extremes. Built on terraces above the river, their towns had populations averaging about 600 people.

The people grew crops on the floodplains below their towns, planting in areas moistened by overflow from the rivers or near ephemeral streams. Agriculture under such conditions is risky; the people also depended on gathering wild foods such as mesquite, prickly pears, and agaves. They caught catfish in the rivers. Some of the La Junta Indians journeyed to the Great Plains 150 or more miles northeast to hunt buffalo or trade for buffalo meat with the nomadic Jumano.

The Spanish found the Rio Grande Valley well-populated north to present-day El Paso, Texas. Beyond there, they encountered no people until the Pueblo settlements fifteen days' travel upriver from El Paso. Above La Junta they encountered peoples later called the Suma and Manso Indians. They seem to have been less agricultural and more nomadic than the people of La Junta.

Based on the development of their weapons and shields, warfare between the La Junta Indians and their neighbors seemed common. Spanish explorers described composite bows strengthened with buffalo sinews and "excellent shields" of buffalo hide.

Slave raids at La Junta by the Spanish may have begun as early as 1563; at about the same time that Apache Indians began raiding from the north. The Spanish transported captured La Junta Indians to work as laborers in the silver mines of Parral, Chihuahua.

== 17th century ==
After the Spanish found shorter routes to travel north to their colonies in New Mexico, they bypassed La Junta. It became a quiet backwater of little interest except to slavers and priests. In the 17th century, the accumulated losses due to Eurasian infectious diseases, and Apache and Spanish raids caused the population to diminish.

In 1683, Juan Sabeata (Jumano) reignited Spanish interest in La Junta. He appealed to the governor in El Paso to send priests to the area, saying that the Indians wanted to become Christian. Sabeata also asked the Spanish to help the La Junta to defend against the Apache. Four priests and several soldiers were assigned to La Junta, arriving to find that the Indians had already built thatched-roof churches for them. The Spanish appointed Sabeata as governor and La Junta became temporarily prominent as a regional trade center, but Sabeata could not gain Spanish assistance to combat the Apache.

When the Indians all over Northern Mexico revolted in 1689 to protest the continuing slave trade, the missions in La Junta were closed. The Spanish tried to reestablish a foothold there. A party visited in 1715, when they found the population had declined to 2,100. They did not build a fort and mission until 1760. By this time the La Junta Indians had further declined in number. Many of the survivors soon left the area, discouraged by the harshness of Spanish rule, continuing Apache raids, and a new threat from the Comanche, who had moved south from Colorado. Some La Junta Indians were forcibly transported to work in the silver mines of Parral; others intermarried with Spanish soldiers and their descendants became part of the Mestizo population; and still others joined their former enemies, the Apache and the Comanche.
