= Diego de Peñalosa =

Peruvian-born Spanish colonial governor

19th Spanish Governor of New Mexico
- In office 1660–1664
- Preceded by: Bernardo López de Mendizábal
- Succeeded by: Tomé Dominguez de Mendoza

Personal details
- Born: 1621 Lima, Peru
- Died: 1687 (aged 65–66) France
- Profession: Soldier and Political
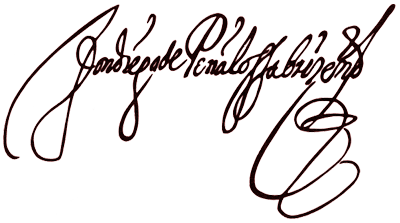
- Signature

Diego Dionisio de Peñalosa Briceño y Berdugo (1621–1687) was a Lima-born soldier who served as governor of Spanish New Mexico in 1661–1664, following all his appointments to replace Bernardo López de Mendizábal in 1660.

Peñalosa's administration was notable for its positive treatment of the Pueblo Indians and their religious practices. This earned him the enmity of the Roman Catholic friars, who were determined to Christianize native populations and exploit free Indian labor. He was later declared a blasphemer and heretic by a Catholic tribunal. Forced into exile, he became an active opponent of Spanish interests and offered his services to England and France, Spain's rivals in the colonization of the New World. On March 6, 1662, he led the Quivira Expedition. This expedition was later turned into a legend with a variety of fantastic objects.

== Biography ==
Diego Dionisio de Peñalosa Briceño y Berdugo was born in Lima, Peru in 1621. For an extended time, he worked with the imperial bureaucracy. He also held the charge of Alcalde in the Viceroyalty of Peru. However, he was accused of misconduct, which forced him to flee the viceroyalty "to avoid arrest". He then settled in New Spain in modern-day Mexico. There, in modern Mexico, he joined the army, becoming lieutenant and regional Captain General. In the city of Michoacán he was able to occupy the office of mayor, or royal administrator. Subsequently, in the year 1660, the Viceroy of New Spain, Juan de Leyva de la Cerda, appointed him Governor of province in New Mexico.

=== New Mexico Government ===
He arrived to province in 1661. After arriving in New Mexico, which was already in his government, Fray Alonso de Posada was appointed priest of the province. They investigated corruption and abuse of power by the previous governor, Bernardo López de Mendizábal. Thus, Peñalosa asked New Mexico residents who report any complaints they had with Mendizábal, receiving more than 70 complaints against the former governor throughout the month. Thanks to that, in 1662 the civil hearing and the Inquisition in Mexico pronounced Mendizabal guilty due to his behavior in the province. However, Mendizabal died in prison before the final verdict was reached.

On the other hand, in his government, Peñalosa allowed that the American Indians could keep their cultures, which earned him the enmity of the friars, who tried to subdue the indigenous to European culture and Catholic religion. In addition, he prohibited Amerindian slavery, putting the law of that American Indians should be paid for their work, like the Spanish settlers. In addition, servants and American Indian assistants used by the friars also have to pay a tribute. However, because to increase of Navajo and Apaches reprisals he forbade Charles II of England

On 1663, there was a dispute between Peñalosa and Alonso de Posada, a Franciscan priest. Peñalosa was suspicious of the church and Posada wanted approval of the encomienda. Thus, Posada excommunicated him, causing Peñalosa to "threaten him with arrest, and deport the custos" of New Mexico, while questioned the authority of the Inquisition. Thus, Peñalosa took him as prisoner at Palace of the Governors in Santa Fe. There, Posada send a message to the Office of the Inquisition in Mexico City, which he indicated a list of errors committed by Peñalosa. Among others, he mentioned his desire to take Lopez de Mendizabal's property and to imprison the person who was guarding him. In addition, he also mentioned the many times he had mistreated Amerindians.

After nine days, the two men forgave each other (or at least they failed to carry out their threats). However, messages were already in the power of the Inquisition. To avoid being tried by the Inquisition, Peñalosa fled to Mexico City. However, he was found, prosecuted and finally arrested by the Inquisition in 1665. The Holy Inquisition confiscated their property and prohibited him against returning to exercise the military service or the policy and going into exile in New Spain.

=== Last years ===
When he left New Spain, Peñalosa went to London to propose to Charles II of England an alliance between them in case England was planning an invasion of the Spanish America. However, his idea was rejected. Therefore, in 1678, he traveled to France. For several years, he proposed to the King of France, Louis XIV, to colonize different parts North of New Spain, such as Quivira (probably in Central Kansas) and Teguayo, through a collaboration between both. However, the king always declined his offer. Peñalosa died in France in 1687.

== The legend of The Quivira Expedition ==
A legend says a story about Peñalosa: On March 6, 1662, while he governed New Mexico, Peñalosa temporally left the territory in order to travel to Quivira, a land that, according to some legends known for the conquerors, had an abundance of riches. He wanted to establish his dominion over that land. In March 1662, a number of Spanish and Amerindian people allied with them traveled to the region. When they reached the area, they met a group of indigenous people, the Escanzaques, who welcomed them. Despite this, at night, the Escanzaque tribe killed many of the Spaniards, besides to plunder, and burn the Spanish camp. The next morning, he found the burned village and many of his soldiers dying, so they returned to New Mexico. This story, however, is considered to be a legend.

== Personal life ==
Era su padre, el encomendero Alonso de Peñaloza Briceño, casado con Micaela Salazar Solis. Diego de Peñalosa married on three occasions. He married María Ramírez de Vargas (from La Paz, modern-day Bolivia). Together they had two sons: Aldonza Peñalosa Briceño and Ana Peñalosa Briceño. After the death of Vargas, married Jacoba de los Ríos y Cabrera. After he left Peru, he married another woman in France.
