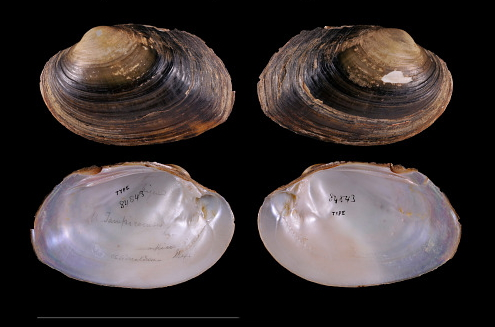
- Shell of Cyrtonaias tampicoensis (specimen at the Smithsonian Institution)

Conservation status
- Endangered (ESA)
- CITES Appendix I

Scientific classification
- Kingdom: Animalia
- Phylum: Mollusca
- Class: Bivalvia
- Order: Unionida
- Family: Unionidae
- Subfamily: Ambleminae
- Tribe: Lampsilini
- Genus: Cyrtonaias
- Species: C. tampicoensis

Binomial name
- Cyrtonaias tampicoensis (I. Lea, 1838)

Synonyms
- Cyrtonaias tampicoensis tampicoensis (I. Lea, 1838); Lampsilis (Cyrtonaias) berlandierii (I. Lea, 1857); Lampsilis (Cyrtonaias) tampicoensis (I. Lea, 1838) (recombination); Lampsilis (Cyrtonaias) tampicoensis berlandierii (I. Lea, 1857); Lampsilis (Cyrtonaias) tampicoensis heermannii (I. Lea, 1862); Lampsilis (Cyrtonaias) tampicoensis kusteriana Frierson, 1927; Lampsilis (Cyrtonaias) tampicoensis tecomatensis (I. Lea, 1841); Lampsilis (Proptera) berlandierii (I. Lea, 1857); Lampsilis (Proptera) tampicoensis (I. Lea, 1838) (recombination); Lampsilis (Proptera) tecomatensis (I. Lea, 1841); Lampsilis berlandieri (I. Lea, 1857); Lampsilis tampicoensis (I. Lea, 1838) (recombination); Lampsilis tampicoensis berlandieri (I. Lea, 1857); Lampsilis tampicoensis tecomatensis (I. Lea, 1841); Margarita (Unio) tampicoensis (I. Lea, 1838) (recombination); Margaron (Unio) berlandierii (I. Lea, 1857); Margaron (Unio) heermannii (I. Lea, 1862); Margaron (Unio) tampicoensis (I. Lea, 1838) (recombination); Margaron (Unio) tecomatensis (I. Lea, 1841); Unio berlandieri I. Lea, 1857 (incorrect spelling); Unio berlandierii I. Lea, 1857; Unio heermannii I. Lea, 1862; Unio tampicoensis I. Lea, 1838 (original combination); Unio tecomatensis I. Lea, 1841; Unio tecomensis (I. Lea, 1841) (incorrect subsequent spelling)

= Cyrtonaias tampicoensis =

Species of freshwater mussel

Cyrtonaias tampicoensis (also known as the Tampico pearly mussel) is a freshwater bivalve mollusc belonging to the family Unionidae.

It is indigenous to the rivers and reservoirs of northeastern Mexico and central Texas via the Rio Grande, all the way to Colorado. C. tampicoensis inhabits waters approximately 6 m (20 ft) deep but has been observed at more substantial depths.

This bivalve is known for one unique feature that separates it from others in its class: its pearl. The Concho pearl is its naturally occurring pink/lavender hue. Ultimately, the Concho led to the mussel being reported as an endangered species effective July 14, 1976.

== General information ==
Cyrtonaias tampicoensis is a bivalve mollusc, descending from Mollusca, the bivalve has undergone the loss of the typical head, and more development of the foot and calcareous shell. It possesses the ability of gonochoristic and Hermaphroditic reproduction, as fertilization is external. These bivalves undergo a Trochophore larvae stage, which is a form of indirect development. Also, bivalves and all trochophore larvae will experience spiral cleavage. Another general Bivalve characteristic will be the bilateral symmetry in shell and mass anatomy.

== Anatomy and characteristics ==
Cyrtonaias tampicoensis can reach sizes over 130 mm (5.1 in) in length and is similar to Mercenaria or Spisula marine bivalves. Most of these bivalves’ coloration appears as yellowish-brown and faint green rays, possibly with dark brown and black. The coloration and pattern of this bivalve are comparable to that of a tropical reef setting. The Concho pearl exhibits a light pink and lavender hue due to C. tampicoensis having the same coloration in the inner shell. Otherwise, C. tampicoensis follows the typical layout of a bivalve mollusc. Having a muscular foot for movement, a calcareous shell, and a lack of head, it lives the life of a typical bivalve. It can attach to the substrate via the byssus threads or move around, as the mussel filter feeds for survival.

== Habitat ==
Cyrtonaias tampicoensis inhabits a riverine habitat, which is why the Rio Grande is primarily where they are found. Therefore, they can be found in Texas, Colorado, New Mexico, and rarely Oklahoma (via river offshoots). In addition it is also found in the Coahuila region of Mexico. The river provides a muddy and murky fertile environment for these Mussels to grow and is quite different from a marine setting.

== Pearl ==
The Concho pearl is a coveted and rare occurring natural pearl, harvested from C. tampicoensis. These naturally forming pearls occur in 3-4% of C. tampicoensis, which is roughly 1 out of every 500–1,000 possessing a pearl. This pearl craze can be traced back to the early Spanish present-day Texas and Mexico in the mid-17th century. Even in the present day, the GIA (Gemological Institute of America), recognizes this pearl as a naturally occurring phenomenon, and exclusive to C. tampicoensis. Nine loose pearls were donated from Stone Group Laboratories for study and cataloging, as a natural Concho is hard to find in the present day.

== Endangerment ==
C. tampicoensis has been a federally endangered species of the United States of America since 1976. This is primarily due to the harvesting of the Concho pearls. Consumption of this mussel is generally not desirable. While considered endangered, the Texan Game and Wildlife has deemed C. tampicoensis as ‘Apparently Secure’. In contrast, Mexico does not have much information on the status of C. tampicoensis, but the U.S. Fish and Wildlife Service deems this mussel as Endangered wherever found. A survey of mussels in the Rio Conchos Basin, could not locate any specimens of C. tampicoensis. In contrast, Texas law still allows for 11 kg (25 lb) of whole mussel harvest per day with a 70 mm (2.75 in) shell length minimum for harvest of the Tampico Pearly Muscle. The species is restricted from international trade by its listing on Appendix I of the Convention on International Trade in Endangered Species of Wild Fauna and Flora (CITES), where it is listed under its synonym Unio tampicoensis tecomatensis.
