= Ascarate =

Ascárate is a surname. Notable people with the surname include:

- Gabriel Ascárate (born 1987), Argentine rugby union footballer
- Ignacio Baleztena Ascárate (1887–1972), Spanish folk customs expert, politician and soldier
- Joaquín Baleztena Ascárate (1883–1978), Spanish politician

== See also ==
- El Paso, Texas
