= Jumanos =

Historical tribe from Western Texas and Northern Mexico

Jumano
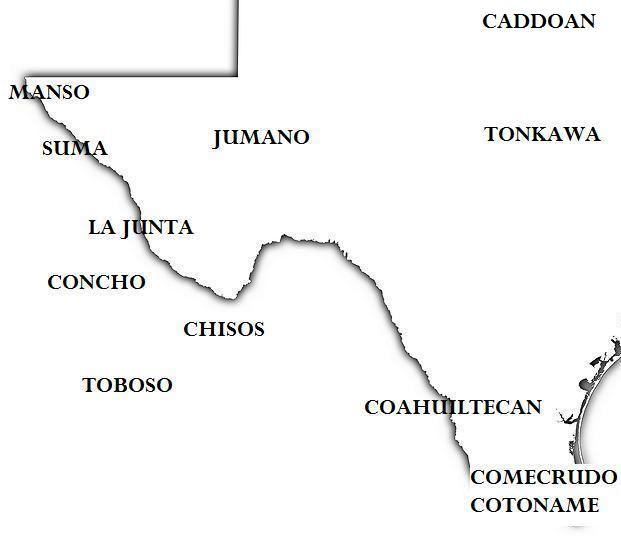
- The approximate location of Indian tribes in western Texas and adjacent Mexico, in the early 17th century

Total population
- Extinct as a tribe by the late 18th century. 20,000 and 30,000 (1580)

Regions with significant populations
- West Texas, Northern Mexico

Languages
- Jumano language (unattested)

Religion
- Indigenous religion, Roman Catholicism

Related ethnic groups
- possibly Apache, Wichita

The Jumanos were a tribe or several tribes, who inhabited a large area of western Texas, New Mexico, and northern Mexico, especially near the Junta de los Rios region with its large settled Indigenous population. They lived in the Big Bend area in the mountain and basin region. Spanish explorers first recorded encounters with the Jumano in 1581. Later expeditions noted them in a broad area of the Southwest and the Southern Plains.

The last historical reference was in a 19th-century oral history, but their population had already declined by the early 18th century. Scholars have generally argued that the Jumanos disappeared as a distinct people by 1750 due to infectious disease, the slave trade, and warfare, with remnants absorbed by the Apache or Comanche. Frederick Webb Hodge proposed that they merged into the Wichita people, having morphed first to be known as the Tawehash, considered a division of the Wichita.

== Name ==
Variant spellings of the name attested in Spanish documents include Jumana, Xumana, Humana, Umana, Xoman, Sumana, Chome, Humano, Juman, Xumano, and Xume.

== Enigma ==
Spanish records from the 16th to the 18th centuries frequently refer to the Jumano Indians, and the French mentioned them as present in areas in eastern Texas, as well. During the last decades of the 17th century, they were noted as traders and political leaders in the Southwest. Contemporary scholars are uncertain whether the Jumano were a single people organized into discrete bands, or whether the Spanish used Jumano as a generic term to refer to several different groups, as the references spanned peoples across a large geographic area.

The Jumano have been identified in the historical record of present-day Texas. They combined and became a new people in a process of ethnogenesis, formed from refugees fleeing the effects of disease, Spanish missions, and Spanish slaving raids south of the Rio Grande.

Cabeza de Vaca may have encountered the Jumano in 1535 near La Junta, the junction of the Conchos River and Rio Grande at Presidio, Texas. He describes his visit to the "people of the cows" in one of the towns, but these may have been the settled Indians of La Junta. They were people "with the best bodies that we saw and the greatest liveliness." He described their cooking method, in which they dropped hot stones into prepared gourds to cook their food, rather than cooking in pottery. Their cooking technique was common among the nomads of the Great Plains, for whom pottery was too fragile to be transported. For this reason, scholars think he may have been describing the semi-nomadic Jumano.

The Spanish explorer Antonio de Espejo first used the term Jumano in 1582, to refer to agricultural peoples living at La Junta. This area was a trade crossroads and seems to have attracted numerous Indians of different tribes, of which the Jumano were one group. Among the other names the Spanish used for Indian groups near La Junta were the Cabris, Julimes, Passaguates, Patarabueyes, Amotomancos, Otomacos, Cholomes, Abriaches, and Caguates. A member of Espejo's expedition identified some bison-hunters whom they encountered on the Pecos River near Pecos, Texas as being Jumano.

The hunters were known to have close relations with the Indians at La Junta, but whether they were full-time bison-hunting nomads, or lived part of each year in La Junta is uncertain. Charles Kelley has suggested that the sedentary people living at La Junta were Patarabueye and the bison hunters were Jumano. In this scenario, the nomadic Jumano maintained close relations—and possibly spoke a similar language—with the people living at La Junta, but were distinct from them. From their recognized homeland between the Pecos and Concho Rivers in Texas, the Jumano traveled widely to trade meat and skins to the Patarabueye and other Indians in exchange for agricultural products.

The Spanish identified as Humanas or Ximenas the people associated with the Tompiro Pueblos of the salinas, an area about 50 miles east of the Rio Grande on the border of the Great Plains. The pueblo later called Gran Quivira was the largest of several Jumano towns. This location enabled trading with the buffalo-hunting Indians of the Great Plains. The Jumano also mined extensive salt deposits, for which the Spanish named the region salinas. They traded salt for agricultural produce. The people living in the Tompiro pueblos have been identified as speaking a Tanoan language. The historian Dan Flores has suggested that the Jumano associated with the Pueblo villages were the ancestors of the Kiowa, who are also Tanoan-language speakers. The Tompiro towns were abandoned by 1672, probably due to fatalities from epidemics of introduced European diseases, Apache raids, and burdensome Spanish levies of food and labor.

Scholars have suggested that a fourth group of people in Texas may have been Jumano. In 1541, Francisco Vásquez de Coronado encountered a group of people he called Teyas at the headwaters of the Brazos River. Scholars have suggested that the Teyas were Apache, Wichita, or Jumano. American anthropologist Carroll Riley suggests that they were the nomadic relatives of the Pueblo villagers of Gran Quivira and the salines. Over the next two centuries, the people who became known as the Wichita were often referred to as Jumano in the historical record. Scholars agree that, at a minimum, the Jumanos comprised the nomadic bison-hunting people of the Pecos and Concho River valleys of Texas. Since as nomads and traders, they were often found far from their homeland, this may account for the Spanish having referred to a variety of Indians of different cultures and locations as Jumano.In his book The Indian Southwest: 1580-1830: Ethnogenesis and Reinvention (1999), Gary Anderson proposes that the Jumano includes multiple ethnic groups from diverse regions of Texas. They combined and became a new people in a process of ethnogenesis, formed from refugees fleeing the effects of disease, Spanish missions, and Spanish slaving raids south of the Rio Grande.

== History ==
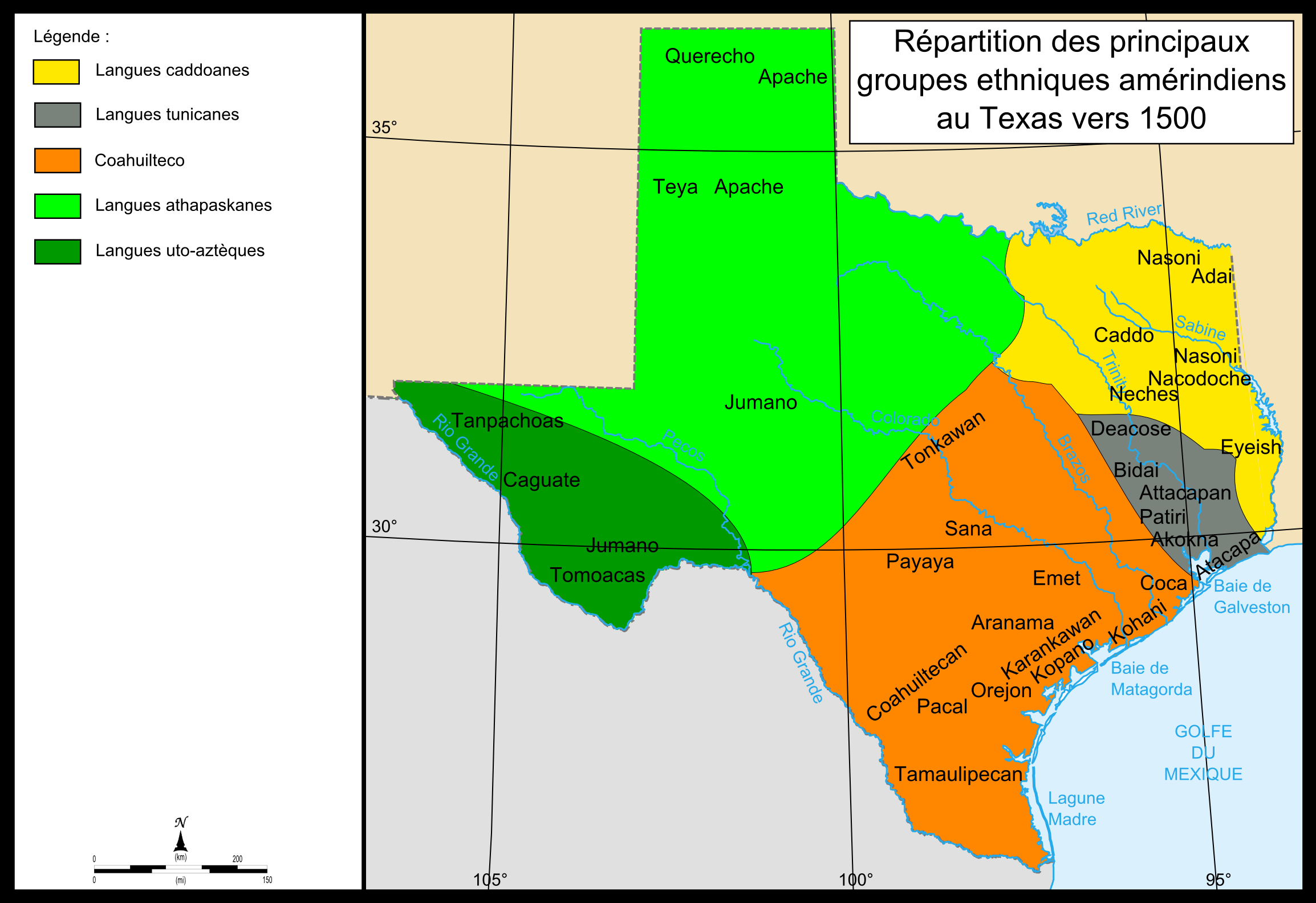
Map of Indigenous peoples in Texas around 1500

=== 16th century ===
In the 16th century when the Spanish came to the Tompiro Pueblos of New Mexico, the Tompiro traded extensively with the Jumano. Historical records indicate Franciscan missionaries, including Juan de Salas, were surprised when Jumanos approached them requesting baptism. The Jumanos stated that they received instruction from "a lady in blue", believed to be Sister Mary of Jesus of Ágreda.

Scholars estimate that in 1580, the population of Native Americans, partially or wholly Jumano, living along the Rio Grande and the Pecos River was somewhere between 20,000 and 30,000. Other people may have been identified as part of the Jumano people, or at least closely associated with them, living further east in Texas at this time. Other groups closely associated with the Jumano and who at times have been identified as Jumano were the Julimes, Tobosos, and Conchos living progressively further south along the Conchos River from its intersection with the Rio Grande.

=== 17th century ===
The Jumano of the late 17th century sought an alliance with the Spanish. They were under pressure from the Lipan Apache and Mescalero Apache advancing from the north, and drought had adversely affected the agricultural yields and the buffalo herds in their territory. The Jumano asked for Christian missions to be established in their territory; they tried to mediate between the Spanish and other tribes. The Spanish visited them in the homeland on the Concho River in 1629, 1650, and 1654. In 1654, the Spanish of the Diego de Guadalajara expedition aided the Jumano in a battle against the Cuitaos (probably the Wichita) and gained a rich harvest of bison skins. In the 1680s, the Jumano chief Juan Sabeata was prominent in forging trade and religious ties with the Spanish. In the latter part of the 17th century, the colonists seem to have lost interest in the Jumano, transferring their priorities to the Caddo of east Texas. The Caddo were more numerous and of greater concern to the Spanish because the French were trying to establish a trading foothold among them.

=== 18th century ===
In the early 18th century, the Jumano tried to create an alliance with their historical enemies the Apache. By 1729, the Spanish referred to the two tribes as the Apache Jumanos. By 1750, the Jumano had nearly disappeared from the historical record as a distinct people. They appeared to have been absorbed by bands of Lipan and Mescalero Apache, Caddo, and Wichita; died of infectious diseases, or become detribalized when living at Spanish missions in Central Texas. If Flores' speculation is correct, they may have migrated north to the Black Hills region and emerged on the Southern Plains about 1800 as the Kiowa.

== Language ==
Jumano
- Native to: United States, Mexico
- Region: Texas, New Mexico
- Ethnicity: Jumano
- Extinct: by 1750
- Language family: unclassified

Language codes
- ISO 639-3: None (mis)
- Glottolog: juma1248

Scholars have been unable to determine what language family the language was spoken by the historic Jumano belongs to, but Uto-Aztecan, Tanoan, and Athabascan have been suggested. A wordlist was recorded by Fray Nicolas Lopez in 1684, but it has been lost. Only four other words are known.
