= Fernando de Villanueva =

Fernando Villanueva and Armendaris

22nd Governor of New Mexico
- In office 1665–1668
- Preceded by: Juan Durán de Miranda
- Succeeded by: Juan de Medrano y Mesía

Personal details
- Born: San Sebastián, Guipuzcoa, Basque Country, Spain
- Died: May 17, 1679 Mexico City
- Profession: Soldier, judge, mayor, administrator

Fernando de Villanueva y Armendaris (died May 17, 1679) was a Spanish soldier, judge and politician who served as governor of Spanish New Mexico from 1665 to 1668.

== Biography ==
=== Military service ===
Fernando Villanueva y Armendaris was born in the early 17th century in San Sebastián, Gipuzkoa. He was the son of Fernando de Villanueva y Armendaris and Clara de Irigoyen. In 1630 he was enlisted in the Spanish Royal Armada of Ocean Sea. In the army, he was earning a bonus of two gold escudos. In 1634, after joining the Army of Catalonia, in the Crown of Aragon, he was promoted to the rank of alférez. As part of this army, Villanueva fought against the French Army in Leocata, Catalonia, in an attempt to protect it from the enemy siege. In April 1637, he joined the Spanish Royal Armada of the Indies, with whom he fought in the suppression of the Algarve.

Later, he served as a soldier in the presidio of St. Martin, rising to the rank of lieutenant and later sergeant major. On several occasions when went to Puerto Rico to collect supplies, Villanueva had to engage hostile forces. On another occasion, he destroyed the British fortifications of the island of Anguilla.

On several occasions, Villanueva traveled through the islands of the Caribbean for recognition purposes. Once, he fought against the British in San Martin and, after the British defeat, Villanueva did business selling everything captured (the ship and the armaments) in the neighbouring Puerto Rico.

=== Early political career ===
Later, he left Saint Martin and traveled to Nueva Vizcaya (the current Chihuahua and Durango, Mexico), where he served on the lands of the Tepehuán people, particularly in the Guanaceví mines and San Pedro. In these places, Villanueva obtained the titles of justicia mayor and capitán a guerra ("chief judge" and "war captain"). He managed to establish peace with the indigenous of the place, which allowed him to raise the tax known as the "Quinto Real". During his administration, Villanueva was faced with a revolt, which he managed to quell. After leaving the site, he joined the Armada de Barlovento.

In 1644 he fought in the Thirty Years War. On September 14, 1647, Villanueva was appointed as Alcalde Mayor y Capitán de Guerra in other three places: Autlán, and the ports of Christmas and the Cape. Also, on August 25, 1653, Villanueva began to serve as captain of the presidio of San Sebastian, Chiametla and Acaponeta, in the Kingdom of Nueva Vizcaya.

Later, on November 21, 1654, Villanueva traveled to Chametla and Acaponeta with a troop of soldiers from San Sebastian to stop a war that the various indigenous tribes were waging against each other. On the other hand, the Jesuit priests warned Villanueva that the Amerindian were planning a revolt against the Spanish government. So, over the next two years, Villanueva researched the villas and managed to prevent the revolt.

On September 12, 1659, Villanueva was assigned as judge protector of several Indigenous peoples of Saltillo, particularly of the Guachichiles and Tlaxcala. He began his duties on November 15, 1659. While he was in charge, he fought against the Amerindians from border areas who wanted to invade the Guachichiles territory, and protected the Saltillo's royal warehouses. During the conflict, the troops of Villanueva caught numerous invaders, including some children. However, the children were used to make a pact with the rebels: they would be returned to them if the rebels left the territory. The pact was a success. After the peace was established, Villanueva delivered supplies and clothes to forty-five warriors captured in order to ensure the peace was accepted by the former invaders. After that, Villanueva let them go. Villanueva left office on December 1, 1661.

=== Governorship of New Mexico ===
On January 14, 1665, as a direct result of his service as a judge protector of Guachichiles, he was appointed governor and captain general of New Mexico, replacing Juan Durán de Miranda. He assumed the post of governor on March 10, 1665.

The Puebloans planned a revolt in an alliance the Apache, with the aim of killing the governor and the priests. For their part, the Amerindians who had been Christianised would be slavered by them. The revolt was promoted by Piro Pueblos of Senecú, with the support of the Amerindians of Socorro. They killed 17 people among soldiers and Christianized Amerindians in the Magdalena Mountains, in Socorro. In order to prevent the revolt, Villanueva repressed the perpetrators and conspirators of the rebellion. He had the six Pueblo that promoted it, in addition to severely punishing to all the people he considered linked to the revolt, whether they were conspirators or accomplices, both in Senecú and Socorro. Villanueva then forgave to all other members of the revolt.

He ended his government on November 29, 1668.

=== Later years and Death ===
Later, Villanueva was elected mayor of Huauchinango, in Southern of modern Mexico. He held that position until 1678.

One year later, Villanueva was in Mexico City, where he died on May 17, 1679.
