= Suma people =

Suma
Total population
- extinct as a tribe

Regions with significant populations
- Mexico (Chihuahua), United States (Texas)

Languages
- Suma language

Religion
- Indigenous religion, Roman Catholicism

Related ethnic groups
- Jumano

The Suma were an Indigenous people of Aridoamerica. They had two branches, one living in the northern part of the Mexican state of Chihuahua and the other living near present-day El Paso, Texas. They were semi-nomadic hunter-gatherers who practiced little or no agriculture. The Suma merged with Apache groups in the US and in Mexico merged with the mestizo population of northern Mexico, and are extinct as a distinct people.

== Name ==
The Suma are often included in the term Jumanos. Their name has been written as Buma, Suna, Zuma, Zumana, and Sume. They are also called the Shuman and Zuma.

== Identity and livelihood ==
Confusion is rife concerning the complex mix of Indigenous peoples who lived near the Rio Grande in west Texas and northern Mexico. They are often collectively called Jumanos, a name which could only be applied to the Plains Indians who lived in the Pecos River and Concho River valleys of Texas but traveled to and traded with the people in the Rio Grande Valley. Near La Junta de los Rios, the junction of the Rio Grande and the Rio Conchos, were a large number of farming villages whose inhabitants were given more than a dozen names by the Spanish. It is unclear whether the La Junta Indians belonged to a single ethnic group and spoke the same language or were instead a mixture of languages and peoples. Also unclear is whether they were related to the more nomadic Jumano.

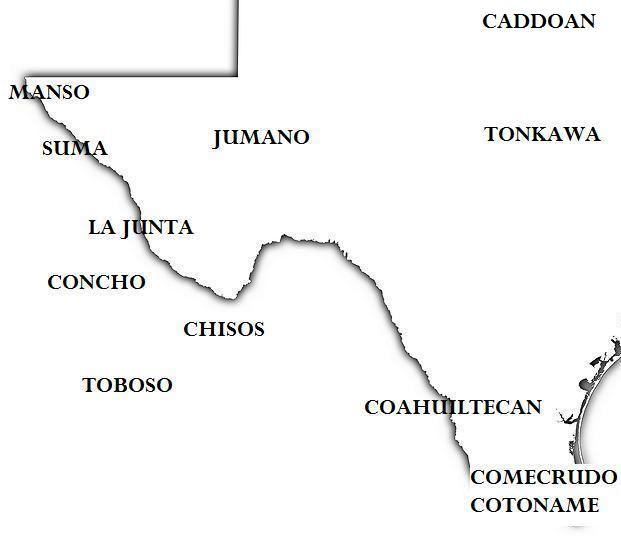
The approximate location of Indian tribes in western Texas and adjacent Mexico, ca. 1600

Upstream on the Rio Grande from La Junta were the people who came to be called the Suma, and further upstream from El Paso northward were the Manso Indians. The Manso and the Suma appear to have had similar cultures, although it is uncertain whether they spoke the same or similar languages. One theory is that the Indians of the El Paso and La Junta regions were intermixed when the Spanish arrived and that the Spaniards separated them into groups for "ease of government and increased control." The opposite is also proposed: that the Manso, Suma, Jumano, and La Junta Indians may have become mixed together in reaction to the threat from the Spanish and their diminishing population due to slave raids and European introduced diseases.

The Suma lived, at least during winter, along 130 miles (210 km) of the Rio Grande southeast (downstream) from El Paso. Their range extended westward from the Rio Grande valley approximately 200 miles (320 km) to the future municipalities of Janos and Nuevo Casas Grandes, Chihuahua. The Janos and Jocomes people of northwestern Chihuahua were probably sub-tribes or closely related to the Suma. As hunter-gatherers the Suma had no fixed habitations. During summer they dispersed in small groups to exploit the plant and animal resources of this territory. The Suma, said early visitors, "are hunters; they eat all sorts of game, wild reptiles, and acorns…mesquite beans, tunas and other cactus fruits, roots, seeds, and unspecific game animals. They have no knowledge whatsoever of agriculture, have no fixed homes, or ranches, and live a carefree life."

The Suma also raided their agricultural neighbors, the Opata, to the west in Sonora.

== Language ==
The language of the Suma is unknown. Scholars have speculated that it belongs to the Uto-Aztecan language family. Jack D. Forbes proposed that their language was Southern Athabaskan language (Apache), but that connection more likely came from their later associations with Apache people.

== Population ==
By 1744, the Suma were 50 family groups. In 1765, likely reduced by smallpox, there were only 21 families. Only one person in 1897 in Senecú, Chihuahua identified as being Suma.

== History ==
The Suma and their neighbors the Manso are believed to be the descendants of the Jornada Mogollon culture. About 1450 CE, the Mogollon pueblos near El Paso were abandoned and the Mogollon people seem to have abandoned agriculture to become hunter/gatherers.

=== 16th century ===
The Suma were not politically united, but rather a group of closely related autonomous bands and sub-tribes each of which acted independently. The Suma were probably encountered by Cabeza de Vaca in 1535, but the first definite mention of them was by Antonio de Espejo in 1583 who called them the Caguates. He was received cordially by more than one thousand of them near the Rio Grande.

=== 17th century ===
The first mention of them by the name "Suma" came in 1630. The Suma at the time were at war with the Opata in Sonora and endangering Franciscan missions. In 1659, a mission was established for the Manso and the "Zumanas", in present-day downtown Ciudad Juárez, and in 1663 another mission was established for them near the city of Chihuahua. Some of the Suma, Manso, and Jumano sought Spanish protection from the growing danger of Apache raids. Others seem to have continued their nomadic ways and joined the Apache.

By 1680, the Missions at El Paso were ministering to over 2,000 Indians, including Sumas. But the Pueblo Revolt in New Mexico caused an additional 2,000 Spaniards and allied Indians to take refuge in El Paso and stretched resources to their limits. A famine resulted in 1683-1684, and in 1684, the Indians revolted and fled the missions. Some of the Sumas returned to the mission later that same year, unable to find enough food to survive. However, some of the Suma, Janos, and Jocomes continued to be hostile to the Spanish, finding a stronghold in the Chiricahua Mountains in Arizona and becoming associated with the Apache and absorbed by them over time. A Chiricahua Apache band, the Chokone or Xocone, may be named after the Jocomes.

=== 18th century ===
During the 18th century, the Suma living at the Mission of San Lorenzo near El Paso were servants of the priests, grew crops, worked as laborers, and adopted many Spanish customs. They also revolted frequently, in 1710, 1726, 1745, and 1749, fleeing the mission and taking refuge in the mountains, often with the Apache. San Lorenzo Mission had a population of 300 in the 1750s of which 150 were Sumas. A smallpox epidemic in the 1780s killed most of the Sumas living at the mission and they soon lost their ethnic identity.

=== 19th century ===
The last known man identifying himself as Suma died in 1869.
