= Manso people =

Indigenous people who lived along the Rio Grande from the 16th to the 17th century

The Manso are an Indigenous people of New Mexico. The Mansos were semi-nomadic hunter-gatherers who practiced little, if any, agriculture. Farming Indians lived both upstream and downstream from them. They had a life style similar to the Suma and the Concho, who lived nearby. They lived along the Rio Grande, from the 16th to the 17th century. Present-day Las Cruces, New Mexico developed in this area. The Manso were one of the indigenous groups to be resettled at the Guadalupe Mission in what is now Ciudad Juarez, Mexico. Some of their descendants remain in the area to this day, mostly in Tortugas Pueblo.

== History ==
The first written account of the Manso is from the expedition of Spanish explorer Antonio de Espejo in January 1583. Traveling up the Rio Grande in search of the Pueblo Indians, Espejo encountered a people he called Tampachoas below El Paso.

"We found a great number of people living near some lagoons through the midst of which the Rio del Norte [Rio Grande] flows. These people, who must have numbered more than a thousand men and women, and who were settled in their rancherias and grass hunts, came out to receive us… Each one brought us his present of mesquite bean…fish of many kinds, which are very plentiful in these lagoons, and other kinds of food…During the three days and nights we were there they continually performed …dances in their fashion, as well as after the manner of the Mexicans."

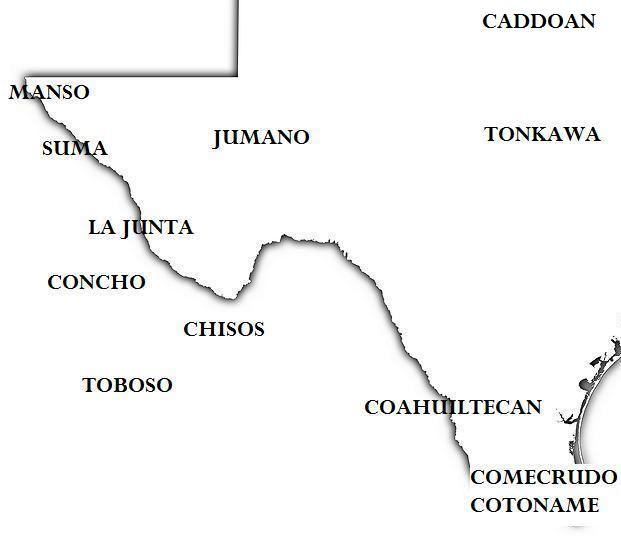
The approximate location of Indian tribes in western Texas and adjacent Mexico, ca. 1600

When the Chamuscado and Rodriguez Expedition passed by the same lagoons in July 1581, they found them uninhabited. Historians believe that the Manso were likely nomadic, living only part of the year along the Rio Grande and passing the remainder of the year hunting and gathering food in the surrounding deserts and mountains. They seemed to have lived along the Rio Grande from present-day El Paso northward to Las Cruces, New Mexico and in the nearby mountains. They may have shared their range with the Suma, whose history is quite similar.

The people whom Espejo called the Tampachoa were probably the same people encountered by Juan de Oñate in the same area in May 1598; he called the natives the Manso. Onate and his large expedition forded the Rio Grande near Socorro, Texas assisted by 40 "manxo" Indians. Manso meant “gentle" or "docile" in Spanish. Their name for themselves is unknown.

In 1630, a Spanish priest described the Manso as people "who do not have houses, but rather pole structures. Nor do they sow; they do not dress in anything particular; but all are nude and only the women cover themselves from the waist down with deerskins."

In 1663, a Spaniard wrote of them,

"The nation of Manso Indians is so barbarous and uncultivated that all its members go naked and, although the country is very cold, they have no houses in which to dwell, but live under the trees, not even knowing how to till the land for their food."

The Manso were also said to eat fish and meat raw. But they were described somewhat favorably as "a robust people, tall, and with good features, although they take pride in bedaubing themselves with powder of different colors which makes them look very ferocious."

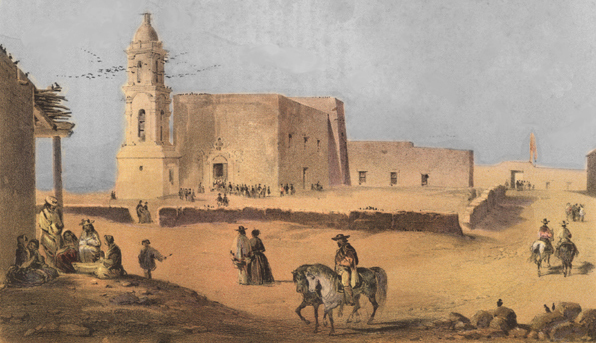
The Mission to the Manso was established by Spanish missionaries in 1659. The mission built by the Manso still exists and is located in downtown Ciudad Juarez, Mexico.

During the 1660s, hundreds of Manso converted to Christianity. The Spanish established a mission among the Manso. The people were of minor concern until the 1680s, when the survivors of the Pueblo Revolt in New Mexico took refuge in the new settlement of El Paso. There the Manso established close relations with the refugee Piro and Tiwa (Tigua) . It is likely that trying to support the 2,000 Spanish and Indian refugees in this area was difficult. The colonists noted that the Manso living at the Mission were "trouble-makers," along with the Apache and Suma still living in the mountains and the deserts.

In 1682, the Governor in El Paso reported that the Manso and the Suma had revolted and attacked the Janos people. On March 14, 1684, friendly Tiwa and Piro told the Governor Domingo Jironza Petriz de Cruzate of a Manso plot to kill all the Spaniards in El Paso. The Manso were said to be “tired of everything having to do with God and with the church, which is why they wanted to do what the Indians of New Mexico had done.”

The Spanish took the ringleaders of the plot as prisoners. They included an Apache and a Quivira (probably a Wichita). Ten of these Natives were executed. In November, the Spanish garrison of 60 men, plus friendly warriors, attacked a gathering of hostile Indians whom they suspected of planning their own revolt.

Following the revolt, the Manso increasingly assimilated into the de-tribalized atmosphere of El Paso. Disease and Apache raids decimated their numbers, although many may have joined the Apache. By 1765, El Paso had 2,469 Spanish inhabitants and only 249 Indians, tribes unspecified.

In 1883, however, Adolph Bandelier found a dozen families of Manso living across the Rio Grande from El Paso. Descendants of the Manso have survived as members of the combined Piro-Manso-Tiwa (PMT) tribe and as members of Tortugas Pueblo, an unincorporated village in Las Cruces, New Mexico. Splitting off the from main body, Manso helped found the Guadalupe Pueblo near Las Cruces in 1910 with the name of the people of the new pueblo becoming Los Indigenes de Nuestra Señora de Guadalupe, a tribal entity that the Piro-Manso-Tiwa tribe was once a part of before the faction occurred.

Two groups claiming descent and historical continuity from the Mission Indians of Paso del Norte have applied for federal recognition as an Indian Tribe: the Piro/Manso/Tiwa Tribe of San Juan de Guadalupe and the Piro/Manso/Tiwa Tribe of Guadalupe. In 2000, there were 206 members of the PMT tribe of San Juan de Guadalupe.

== Language ==
Only a few words of their language were recorded, such as arre 'yes' (cf. Yaqui alla and Opata ore) and ocae 'arrow'. Linguists have theorized about the affiliations of their language: alternatives have been Uto-Aztecan, Tanoan, or Athabaskan (Apache) language. What is known is that they spoke the same language as the Jano and Jocome peoples who lived to their west; it was most likely a Uto-Aztecan language related to the Cahitan languages of northwestern Mexico.
