= Blue Mesa Observatory =

Observatory in New Mexico, U.S.

- Organization: New Mexico State University
- Location: Sierra de las Uvas, New Mexico
- Coordinates: 32.4917°N 107.1666°W
- Altitude: 1,980 meters (6,500 ft)
- Established: 1967
- Closed: 1993

Telescopes
- unnamed telescope: 0.61 m reflector

Blue Mesa Observatory (BMO), also referred to Magdalena Peak Station for the International Planetary Patrol Program, was an astronomical observatory owned and operated by New Mexico State University (NMSU). It was located on Magdalena Peak in the Sierra de las Uvas (Grape Mountains) of southern New Mexico (US), approximately 43 kilometers (27 mi) northwest of Las Cruces. Founded in 1967 under the supervision of Clyde Tombaugh, the observatory was closed in 1993. The site and the 30 acres (0.047 sq mi; 0.12 km^{2}) surrounding it were conveyed to the Federal Aviation Administration, which tore down the observatory building and replaced it with a radar installation.

BMO's main telescope was a 0.61 m (24 in) Cassegrain reflector built by Astro Mechanics and installed in 1969. It was equipped with a Boller and Chivens spectrograph, a spectrophotometer, and a photoelectric photometer. After BMO closed, the telescope and instruments were acquired by Pittsburg State University (PSU) in 1993. It was installed at the PSU-Greenbush Astrophysical Observatory near Girard, Kansas in 1996. PSU operates the observatory in cooperation with several local school districts.

== See also ==
- Tortugas Mountain Observatory
- Corralitos Observatory
- Apache Point Observatory
- List of astronomical observatories
