= Tortugas Mountain Observatory =

Observatory in New Mexico, US

- Named after: Tortugas Mountain
- Organization: New Mexico State University
- Location: Las Cruces, New Mexico
- Coordinates: 32.2931°N 106.6980°W
- Altitude: 1,451 meters (4,760 ft)
- Established: 1963

Telescopes
- unnamed telescope: 0.61 m reflector

Tortugas Mountain Observatory (TMO) is an astronomical observatory owned and operated by New Mexico State University (NMSU). It is located on Tortugas Mountain, also known locally as 'A' Mountain, in southern New Mexico (USA), approximately 8 kilometers (5.0 mi) southeast of Las Cruces and 4 kilometers (2.5 mi) east of the NMSU campus. Founded in 1963 under the supervision of Clyde Tombaugh, the observatory focused on observing the planets. Much of the information captured at TMO is now available through the Planetary Data System's Atmospheres Node, which is managed by NMSU. The two-dome observatory building was completed in 1964, though observing began with one of the telescopes in 1963. A second building, with a larger single dome, was completed at the opposite end of the ridgeline of Tortugas Mountain in 1967. Regular use of TMO ceased in 1999 or 2000, but the observatory equipment was not dismantled. In 2008 it was used for the Lunar Crater Observing and Sensing Satellite project. In 2010, efforts to revive the observatory for use by the American Association of Variable Star Observers began. As of 10 June 2011, work on project was reported to be 60-75% done.

== Telescopes ==
- A 0.61 m (24 in) Cassegrain reflector built by Boller and Chivens was installed in 1967. It remains the largest telescope ever installed at TMO, and the only one reported as operation since 1990. In the 1990s it was used to monitor the Jovian cloud deck and Saturn.
- A 0.41 m (16 in) Gregorian telescope was installed in 1963 and began operating the following year. It was converted to a Cassegrain reflector in 1974.
- A 0.32 m (13 in) Schmidt camera was completed in 1979. It was tested by Tombaugh in 1980 and 1981, but it was never reported as being operational.
- A 0.3 m (12 in) Newtonian/Cassegrain reflecting telescope built by J.W. Fecker, Inc. was installed in 1963.
- A 0.2 m (7.9 in) Cassegrain reflector built by Tinsley Laboratories was installed in 1967.

== See also ==
- Blue Mesa Observatory
- Corralitos Observatory
- Apache Point Observatory
- List of astronomical observatories
