= KRWG =

KRWG may refer to:

- KRWG-TV, a Public Broadcasting Service (PBS) Public television station (channel 22 virtual/23 digital) licensed to Las Cruces, New Mexico, United States
- KRWG (FM), a radio station (90.7 FM) licensed to Las Cruces, New Mexico, United States
