= NGC 7177 =

Galaxy in the constellation Pegasus

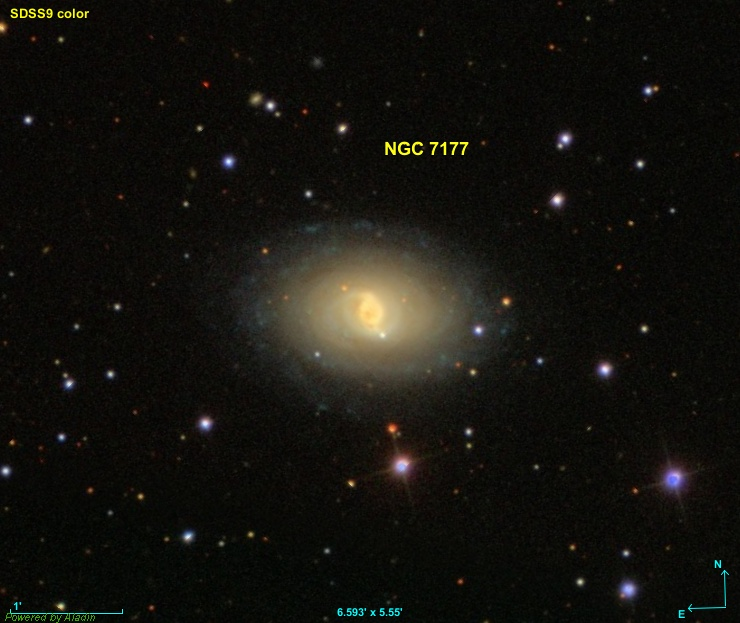
- NGC 7177 imaged by SDSS

Observation data (J2000 epoch)
- Constellation: Pegasus
- Right ascension: 22^{h} 00^{m} 41.2099^{s}
- Declination: +17° 44′ 16.638″
- Redshift: 0.003833
- Heliocentric radial velocity: 1,149±1 km/s
- Distance: 38.6 ± 2.9 Mly (11.82 ± 0.90 Mpc)
- Apparent magnitude (V): 11.2

Characteristics
- Type: SAB(r)b
- Size: ~88,100 ly (27.00 kpc) (estimated)
- Apparent size (V): 3.2′ × 2.1′

Other designations
- UGC 11872, MCG +03-56-003, PGC 67823, CGCG 451-002

NGC 7177 is a barred spiral galaxy in the constellation of Pegasus. Its velocity with respect to the cosmic microwave background is 801±24 km/s, which corresponds to a Hubble distance of 38.6 ± 2.9 Mly (11.82 ± 0.90 Mpc). However, 12 non-redshift measurements give a much farther distance of 86.49 ± 10.33 Mly (26.517 ± 3.166 Mpc). It was discovered by German-British astronomer William Herschel on 15 October 1784.

The SIMBAD database lists NGC 7177 as a LINER galaxy, i.e. a galaxy whose nucleus has an emission spectrum characterized by broad lines of weakly ionized atoms.

== Supernovae ==
Two supernovae have been observed in NGC 7177:

- SN 1960L (type unknown, mag. 16) was discovered by Milton Humason on 14 August 1960.
- SN 1976E (type unknown, mag. 16.5) was discovered by Justus R. Dunlap of the Corralitos Observatory at Northwestern University on 23 September 1976.

== See also ==
- List of NGC objects (7001–7840)
