= Socorro Mission =

Mission in Texas, USA

- U.S. National Register of Historic Places
- Texas State Antiquities Landmark
- Recorded Texas Historic Landmark
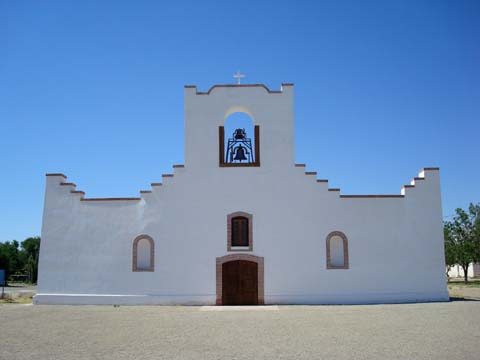
- Socorro Mission

- Location within Texas Location within the United States
- Location: 328 S. Nevarez Rd, Socorro, Texas
- Coordinates: 31°39′33.64″N 106°18′12.55″W
- Area: 11 acres (4.5 ha)
- Built: 1682, 1840
- NRHP reference No.: 72001359
- TSAL No.: 8200000247
- RTHL No.: 3407

Significant dates
- Added to NRHP: March 16, 1972
- Designated TSAL: December 18, 1992
- Designated RTHL: 1963

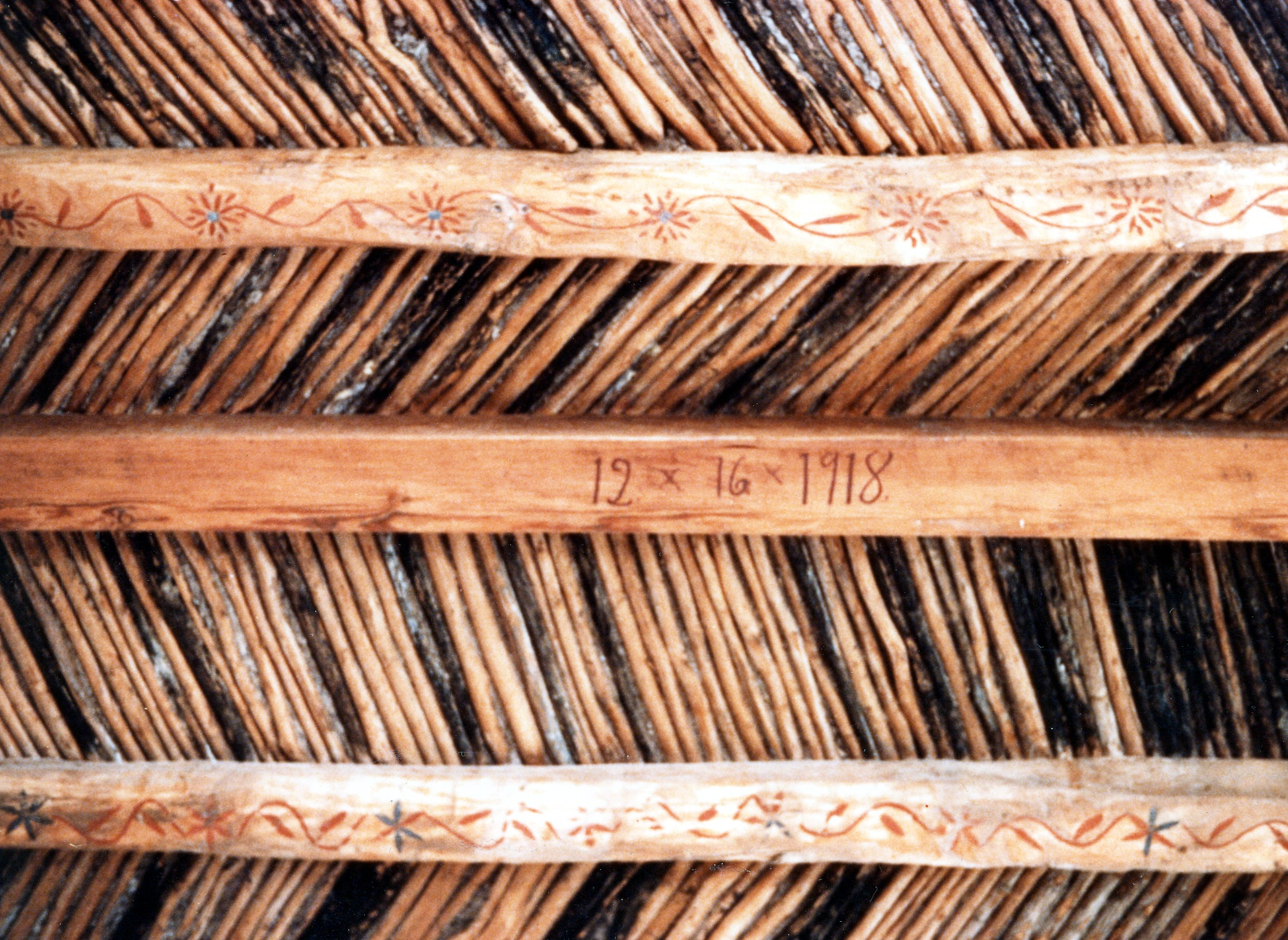
Vigas (ceiling beams) in the Socorro Mission, handcrafted and painted by Piro artisans in 1691

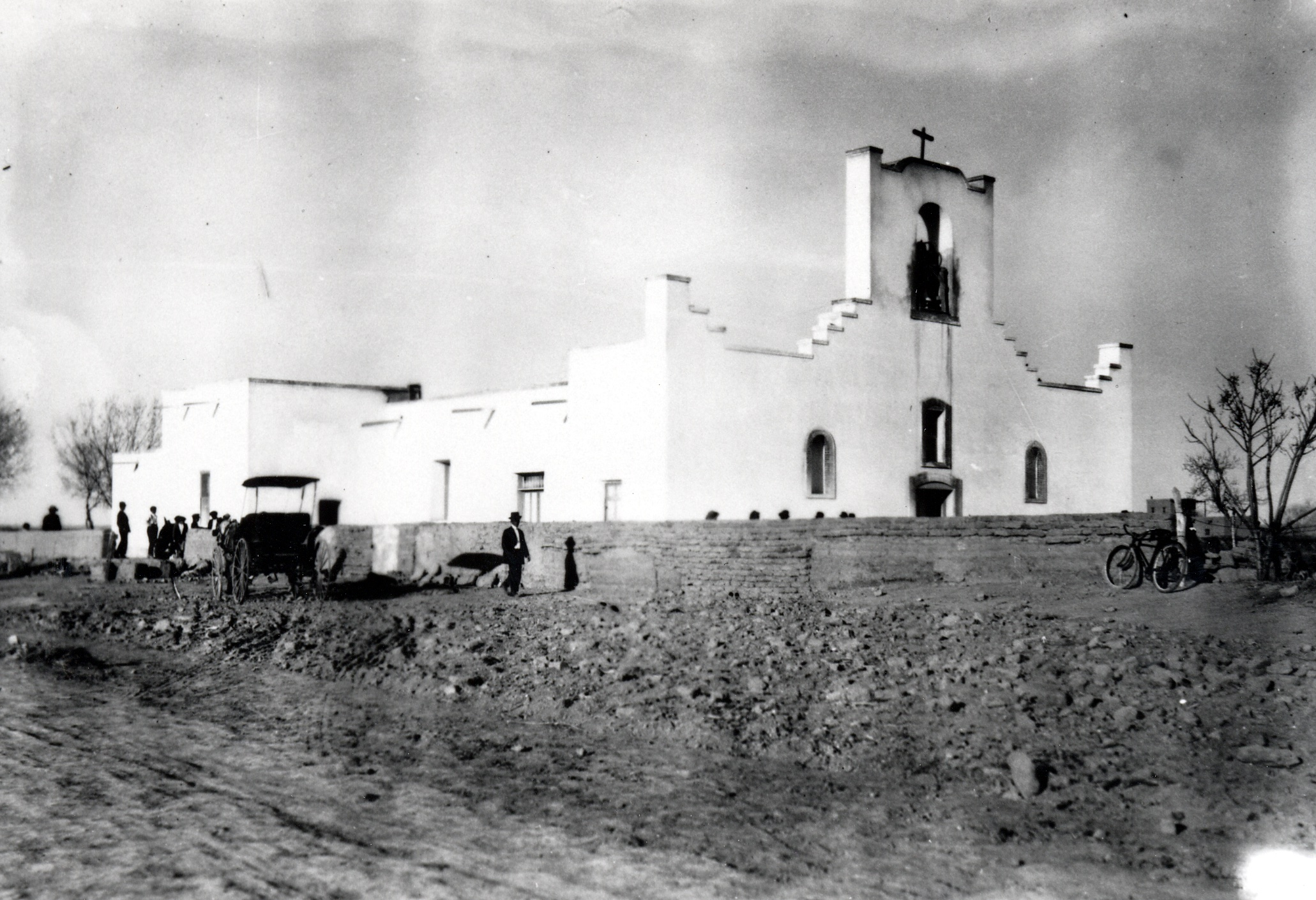
Socorro Mission circa 1900

The Socorro Mission, originally built in the late seventeenth century, is one of three Spanish missions under the stewardship of the Catholic Diocese of El Paso. The mission is a registered Texas historic landmark and listed in the national register as a site with national significance.

The original Franciscan mission, Nuestra Señora de la Concepción del Socorro, was founded in 1682 by the Franciscan order, to serve displaced Spanish families, American Indians (the Piro, Tano and Jemez) from New Mexico, who fled the central New Mexico region during the Pueblo Revolt.

Originally, Nuestra Señora del Socorro was established near the town of Fabens and was moved to present day Socorro in 1682. In 1691, Governor Diego de Vargas, in the name of King Carlos II of Spain, gave the name of Mission de Nuestra Señora de la Limpia Concepcion de los Piros de Socorro del Sur (Our Lady of Immaculate Conception of the Piros of the Socorro of the South) to the mission. By 1766, the Socorro Mission was being referred to as La Purísima Concepción del Socorro. In 1829, flooding on the Rio Grande shifted the river’s course, leaving the towns of Ysleta, Socorro and San Elizario on the future American side of the river and destroying the church in Socorro.

The present Socorro Mission was constructed around 1839 to replace the earlier mission destroyed in the 1829 flooding. The mission, constructed of adobe surfaced with stucco, is particularly notable for its interior. The finely painted and decorated beams, or vigas, were built in 1691 by Piro artisans and were reused when the present church was constructed. The massing, details and use of decorative elements of the Socorro Mission show strong relationships to the building traditions of seventeenth-century Spanish New Mexico.

A full-size replica of the Socorro Mission was featured in El Paso's exhibit in the 1936 Texas Centennial celebration, at the Cotton Bowl in Dallas. It was later dismantled and rebuilt as St. Anthony Church in Dallas.

The Socorro Mission is located at 328 S. Nevarez Road south of El Paso on I-10 at Moon Road and FM 258, in Socorro, Texas.

== See also ==
- Ysleta Mission
- Hueco Tanks
- Mission Nuestra Señora de Guadalupe
- Town of Ysleta, El Paso, Texas
- National Register of Historic Places listings in El Paso County, Texas
- Recorded Texas Historic Landmarks in El Paso County
