= NGC 2935 =

Large galaxy in constellation Hydra

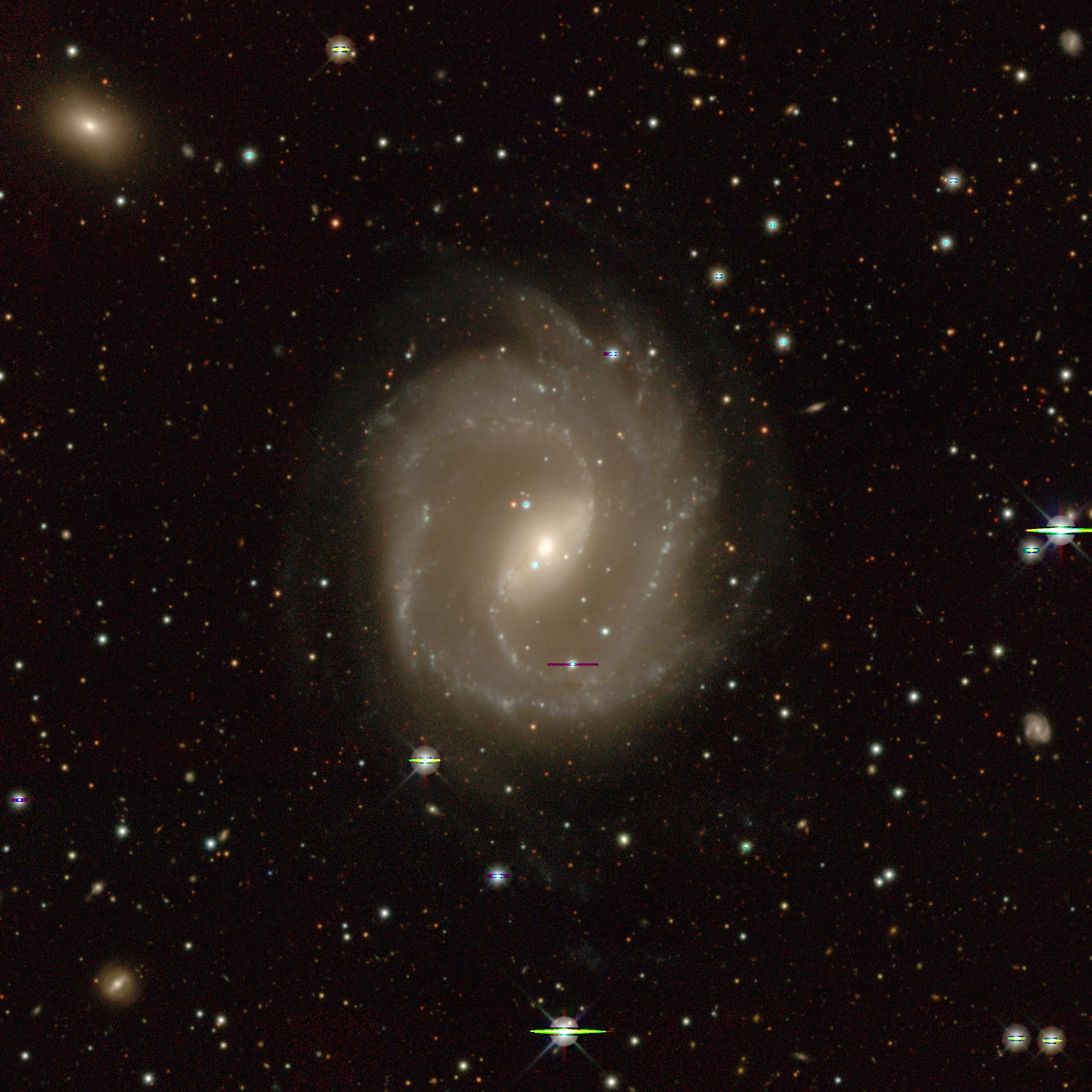
- NGC 2935 imaged by Legacy Surveys

Observation data (J2000 epoch)
- Constellation: Hydra
- Right ascension: 09^{h} 36^{m} 44.8615^{s}
- Declination: −21° 07′ 41.53″
- Redshift: 0.007575
- Heliocentric radial velocity: 2271 ± 3 km/s
- Distance: 90.97 ± 2.40 Mly (27.890 ± 0.736 Mpc)
- Apparent magnitude (V): 12.1
- Surface brightness: 23.9 mag/arcsec^2

Characteristics
- Type: (R')SAB(s)b
- Size: ~185,200 ly (56.79 kpc) (estimated)
- Apparent size (V): 3.7′ × 2.8′

Other designations
- ESO 565- G 023, IRAS 09344-2054, UGCA 169, MCG -03-25-011, PGC 27351

NGC 2935 is a large intermediate spiral galaxy located in the constellation Hydra. Its speed relative to the cosmic microwave background is 2,601 ± 23 km/s, which corresponds to a Hubble distance of 38.4 ± 2.7 Mpc (~125 million ly). It was discovered by German-British astronomer William Herschel on 20 March 1786.

NGC 2935 was used by Gérard de Vaucouleurs as a galaxy of morphological type (R2')SAB(s)b in his galaxy atlas. The luminosity class of NGC 2935 is II and it has a broad HI line. In addition, it is a star-forming burst galaxy.

To date, 29 studies and measurements based on redshift give a distance of 27.890 ± 3.962 Mpc (~91 million ly), which is outside the Hubble distance values. Note that it is with the average value of independent measurements, when they exist, that the NASA/IPAC database calculates the diameter of a galaxy and that consequently the diameter of NGC 2935 could be approximately 78, 1 kpc (~255,000 ly) if we used the Hubble distance to calculate it.

== Nuclei disk ==
Observations from the Hubble Space Telescope have concluded that a star-forming disk is present around the core of NGC 2935. The size of its semi-major axis is estimated at 530 pc (~1730 light years) at the estimated distance of this galaxy.

== Supernovae ==
Four supernovae have been discovered in NGC 2935:

- SN 1975F (type unknown, mag. 15) was discovered by Yvonne Dunlap and Justus R. Dunlap of the Corralitos Observatory at Northwestern University on 11 June 1975.
- SN 1996Z (Type Ia, mag. 16) was discovered by Wayne Johnson on 16 May 1996.
- SN 2021mwj (Type II, mag. 17.674) was discovered by ATLAS on 21 May 2021.
- SN 2021aczp (Type II, mag. 18.878) was discovered by ATLAS on 1 November 2021.

== NGC 2935 Group ==
NGC 2935 is part of a small group of three galaxies named after it. The other two galaxies in the NGC 2935 group are NGC 2983 and NGC 2986.

== See also ==
- List of NGC objects (2001–3000)
- New General Catalogue
- List of spiral galaxies
