= Tortugas Mountain =

Mountain in New Mexico

Coordinates: 32°17′33.47″N 106°41′51.59″W

Geography
- Country: United States
- State: New Mexico

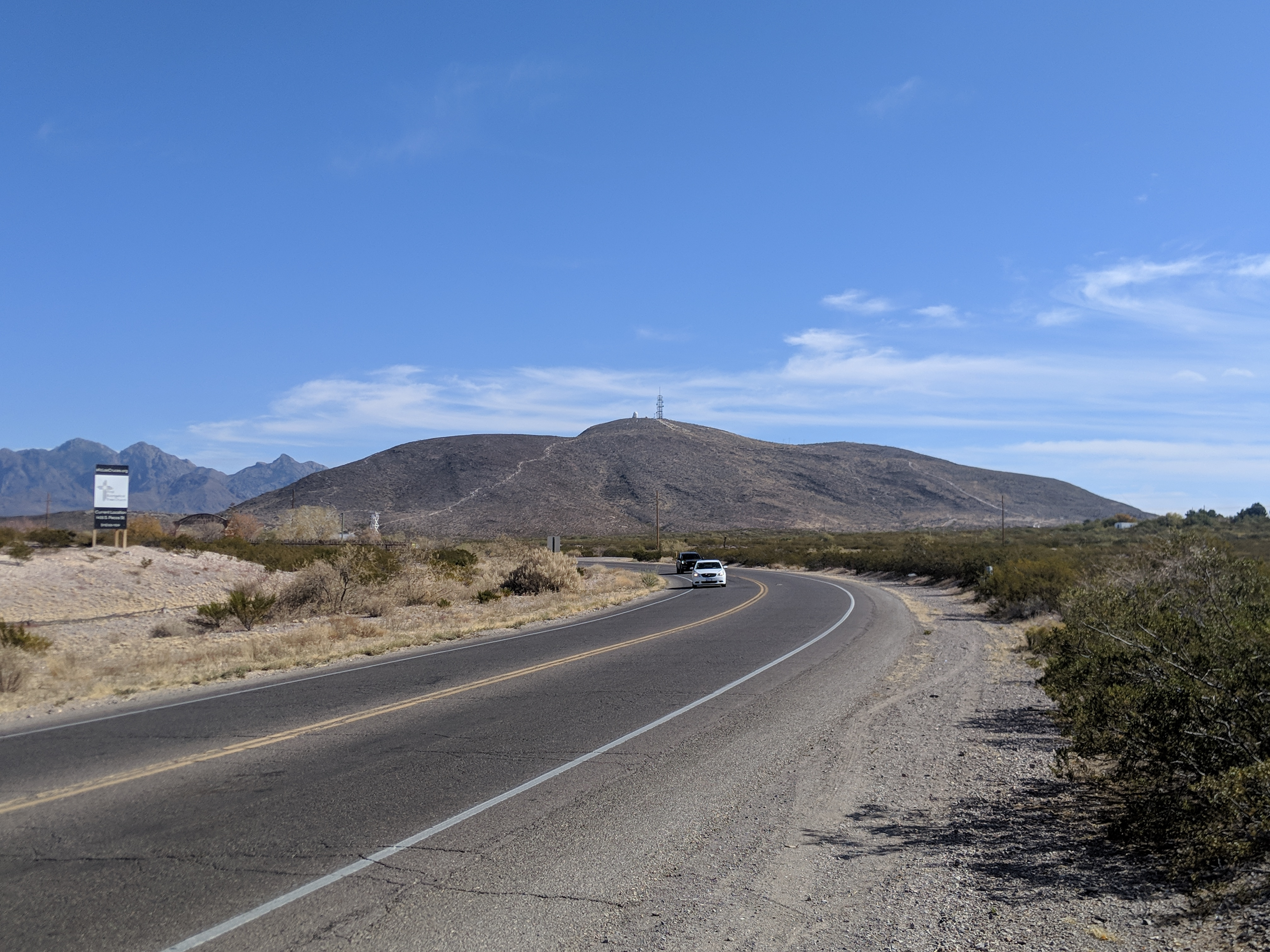
Tortugas Mountain

Tortugas Mountain is a mountain in southern New Mexico, in the village of Tortugas in Doña Ana County, New Mexico. It is also known locally as 'A' Mountain.

There is a letter "A" on the mountain referring to the Aggies, mascot of New Mexico State University.

It is the site of the Tortugas Mountain Observatory, an astronomical observatory owned and operated by New Mexico State University.

A pilgrimage to the top of the mountain is part of the annual Fiesta of Our Lady of Guadalupe. It is a 4 miles (6.4 km) climb, which some participants do barefoot.
