= Tortugas Pueblo =

Community in Doña Ana County, New Mexico

Tortugas, New Mexico
- Village
- Location within New Mexico Location within the United States
- Coordinates: 32°16′11″N 106°45′10″W
- Country: United States
- State: New Mexico
- County: Doña Ana
- Founded: 1852
- Elevation: 3,904 ft (1,190 m)

Population (2020)
  - Total: 579
- Time zone: UTC−07:00 (Mountain)
  - Summer (DST): UTC−06:00 (DST)
- GNIS feature ID: 2806700
- Website: https://tortugaspueblo.com

Tortugas Pueblo or Tortugas, New Mexico is a community in Doña Ana County, New Mexico, just outside of Las Cruces, New Mexico. As of the 2020 census, the CDP's population was 579.

Tortugas Pueblo, as it is commonly referred to as, was the area of land that was granted to tribal members of the Piro, Manso, and Tiwa tribe in Las Cruces.

== Geography ==
Tortugas is located just south of the New Mexico State University and Interstate 10.

The community is located near an oxbow of the Rio Grande, which in the past had many turtles ("tortugas" in Spanish).

== History ==
Tortugas was founded in 1852. Tortugas Pueblo, as it is commonly referred to as, was the area of land that was granted to tribal members of the Piro, Manso, and Tiwa tribe in Las Cruces. Originally Tortugas was made up of two Native villages, the Pueblo of Guadalupe and the Pueblo of San Juan de Guadalupe. Many of the people living in Tortugas today are members and descendants of the tribe, as well as descendants of various other tribes in the surrounding area including Jumanos, Sumas, Apaches, Conchos, and Rarámuri. Despite being considered extinct, Manso Indians are part of the population that make up members of the Tortugas community. The area of land in present-day Las Cruces down the Rio Grande into Juarez, Mexico was the territory of the Manso people before the Spanish came through and before other tribes began moving in. The Tiwa (or Tigua) from Isleta Pueblo and Piro people from near Socorro, New Mexico moved into the area after the Pueblo Revolt, when many Native Spanish allies as well and Native slaves of the Spanish, also known as genizaros, traveled south from Santa Fe into Paso del Norte (present day El Paso) where missions were established for the Natives in the area to attend. Many people in Tortugas are also descendants of Ysleta del Sur Pueblo, a pueblo in Texas that was established after the Pueblo Revolt as well. Despite not being federally recognized, Tortugas has maintained its Native cultural heritage and traditions and has thrived as an inter-tribal community. The current cacique is Patrick Narvaez.

Tortugas is home of the Tortugas Pueblo Fiesta of Our Lady of Guadalupe, a feast day celebration observed every year on December 10–12 that incorporates Native traditions with Catholic influence. There are four dance groups in Tortugas that dance during the ceremony, including the Pueblo Indian dancers, the Danzantes, the Danzantes Guadalupana, and the Danzantes Chichimecas, the latter two being matachines dance groups.

== Education ==
It is located in Las Cruces Public Schools.
