= Tortugas Pueblo Fiesta of Our Lady of Guadalupe =

- U.S. National Register of Historic Places
- Location within New Mexico
- Location: Bounded by Emilia Rd., E. Guadalupe St., Juan Diego Ave., and Stern Dr., Tortugas, New Mexico
- Coordinates: 32°16′11″N 106°45′10″W
- NRHP reference No.: 100001437
- Added to NRHP: August 7, 2017

The Fiesta of Our Lady of Guadalupe in the village of Tortugas, New Mexico, in Doña Ana County, New Mexico, is an annual three day festival in December. It includes processions, church services, traditional dances, and a 4-mile (6.4 km) pilgrimage up Tortugas Mountain. The festival is held December 10, 11, 12.

It honors the Virgin and relates to Nuestra Señora de Guadalupe.

The festival originated at the Mission Nuestra Señora de Guadalupe in what is now Chihuahua in Mexico and was moved later to Tortugas, New Mexico.

The Tortugas Pueblo Fiesta of Our Lady of Guadalupe is the name of a 2017 listing on the U.S. National Register of Historic Places. It presumably includes the shrine and parish of Our Lady of Guadalupe.

The announced bounds of the listing ("bounded by Emilia Rd., E. Guadalupe St., Juan Diego Ave., and Stern Dr.") enclose a five block area, which does include the Our Lady of Guadalupe school.

There was no festival in 2020.
