= KRWG-TV =

Television station in Las Cruces, New Mexico

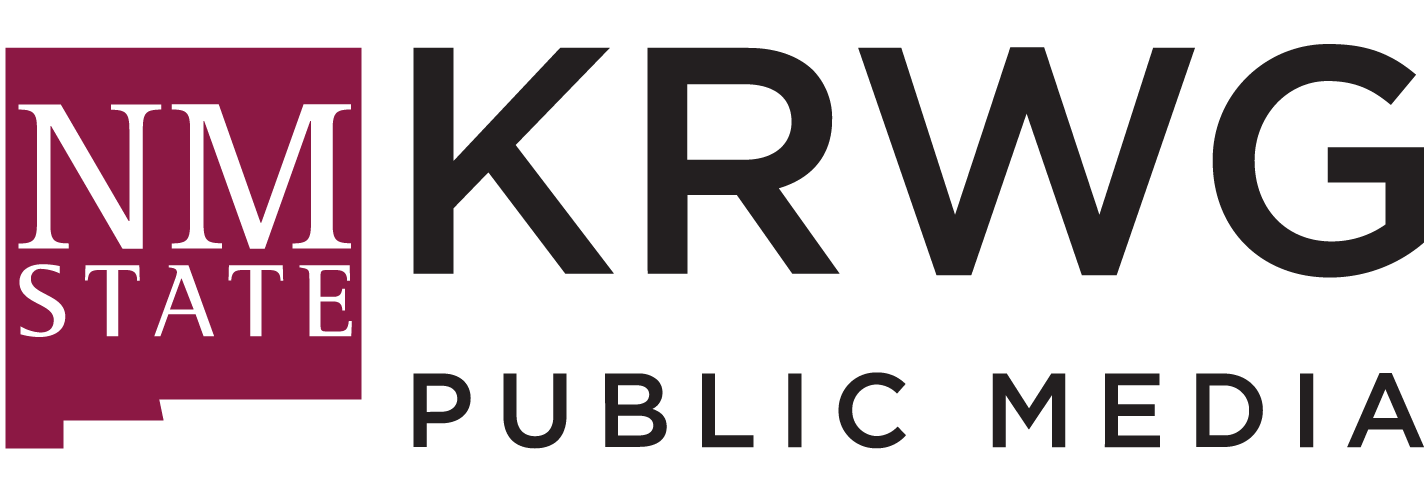
- Las Cruces, New Mexico; United States
- Channels: Digital: 23 (UHF); Virtual: 22
- Branding: KRWG Public Media

Programming
- Affiliations: 22.1: PBS; 22.2: World; 22.3: PBS Kids

Ownership
- Owner: Regents of New Mexico State University
- Sister stations: KRWG (FM)

History
- First air date: June 29, 1973
- Former channel numbers: Analog: 22 (UHF, 1973–2009)
- Call sign meaning: Ralph Willis Goddard, former dean of the NMSU engineering school, as with KRWG radio

Technical information
- Licensing authority: FCC
- Facility ID: 55516
- ERP: ① Tortugas Mountain: 200 kW; ② El Paso: 3.15 kW
- HAAT: ①: 205 m (673 ft); ②: 586 m (1,923 ft)
- Transmitter coordinates: ①: 32°17′33.4″N 106°41′51″W; ②: 31°48′55″N 106°29′22″W
- Translator(s): see § Translators

Links
- Public license information: Public file; LMS
- Website: www.krwg.org

KRWG-TV (channel 22) is a PBS member television station in Las Cruces, New Mexico, United States. It is owned by the Regents of New Mexico State University (NMSU) alongside NPR member KRWG (90.7 FM). The two stations, under the unified brand KRWG Public Media, share studios at Milton Hall on the NMSU campus on McFie Circle in Las Cruces. KRWG-TV has transmitters on Tortugas Mountain in central Doña Ana County, east of Las Cruces, and atop the Franklin Mountains in El Paso, Texas. KRWG-TV's signal is relayed on translator stations across southern New Mexico.

KRWG-TV began broadcasting in 1973 as an adjunct to KRWG radio and as a public broadcaster serving southern New Mexico. It also complements the NMSU journalism program; students produce a newscast that airs three times a week during the school year, and its other local programming also focuses on regional issues.

== History ==
As early as 1963, a year before KRWG (90.7 FM) began broadcasting, New Mexico State University (NMSU) considered establishing a public television station using the channel 12 allotment at Hatch. Channel 12 had been put there two years prior when the University of New Mexico was considering establishing a statewide educational network. However, NMSU soon found Hatch to be an unviable allocation for serving Las Cruces; the transmitter would have to be north of Las Cruces, to protect KELP-TV in El Paso, Texas, when most antennas were oriented south to El Paso. Channel 22 in the ultra high frequency (UHF) band was then assigned to Las Cruces. NMSU applied for a station on November 2, 1970, and received a construction permit on April 4, 1972. The United States Office of Education provided a $467,513 grant to support the construction of the new station. The federal grant primarily went to the facility. By that time, NMSU was programming an hour and a half a day on the local cable system in Las Cruces, an expansion of the university closed-circuit TV system which had been in place since 1965. In addition, equipment was donated by KOB-TV in Albuquerque and the ABC network.

While construction on the transmitter facility was completed by December 1972, a shortage of engineers and delays in equipment installation kept the station from debuting for several months. KRWG-TV began broadcasting on June 29, 1973; the first weekend on air featured a local talent marathon to dedicate the new station. It was the first UHF station on the air between Tucson, Arizona, and Lubbock, Texas, and it was the closest public television station to El Paso until KCOS began in 1978; the cable system in El Paso continued to carry KRWG-TV but dropped KNME-TV from Albuquerque when KCOS debuted.

In 1985, control of KRWG-TV was passed to the broadcast journalism department at NMSU. The original transmitter was replaced in 1991 due to increased unreliability.

KRWG-TV opened the El Paso transmitter in July 2026.

== Funding ==
In 2022, KRWG-TV generated $3.3 million in revenue. The station received $1.07 million in revenue from the Corporation for Public Broadcasting as well as $976,000 in grants from the state and more than $824,000 in equipment restricted grants. Memberships represented $235,847 in income.

== Local programming ==
Harvey Jacobs, head of the NMSU Department of Journalism and Mass Communication, envisioned KRWG-TV as a source of New Mexico–centric news and information for Las Cruces. To that end, the station began with a bilingual, student-produced local newscast, originally titled Panavista. For 20 years, the station aired Qué Pasa with Dolores, a bilingual weekly and previously biweekly talk show hosted by Dolores Lenko.

Most of KRWG-TV's local programming continues to concern southern New Mexico issues. During the fall and spring semesters, students produce News22, which airs three times a week and covers regional issues. When the newscast was threatened by budget cuts in 1997, students and professors expressed a willingness to donate time and money to keep the program on the air. It was saved through donations and a reduction from 44 weeks a year to 28. In 2005, an attempt to change News22 from a live 6:30 p.m. newscast to a taped and edited version broadcast at 10:30 p.m. was met with student pushback. Alumni of the NMSU journalism program that worked on News22 while students at the university include Gadi Schwartz, correspondent for NBC News.

Once a week, the station airs Noticias22, a Spanish-language newscast. Throughout the year, the weekly magazine Newsmakers airs in-depth features.

== Technical information ==
=== Subchannels ===
KRWG-TV's primary transmitter is located atop Tortugas Mountain in central Doña Ana County, east of Las Cruces. The station is a distributed transmission system with the second transmitter located atop the Franklin Mountains in El Paso, Texas. Its signal is multiplexed:

Subchannels of KRWG-TV
Subchannel	Res.	Short name	Programming
22.1	1080i	KRWG HD	PBS
22.2	480i	World	World
22.3	480i	PBSkids	PBS Kids

The PBS Kids subchannel was added in March 2017.

=== Translators ===
Not long after starting, KRWG-TV began extending its reach in southern New Mexico with the addition of translators. In 1976, it filled one of the larger remaining gaps in New Mexico when it opened a translator to serve Alamogordo. Silver City was added in 1978.

The Antelope Wells and Jacks Peak translators were authorized by the Federal Communications Commission in 2023 on a waiver to use money budgeted by the New Mexico state government. The transmitters provide public television service to Antelope Wells as well as datacasting capacity used by local educational and law enforcement agencies. The Jacks Peak transmitter was necessary to provide a signal to the Antelope Wells transmitter.

- Alamogordo: K30QI-D
- Antelope Wells: K25QU-D
- Caballo: K28QE-D
- Deming: K24MX-D, K29MK-D
- Hatch: K28GJ-D
- Hillsboro: K13UL-D
- Jacks Peak: K33QU-D
- Lordsburg: K21OW-D
- Silver City: K28LK-D
- Truth or Consequences: K33PE-D

=== Analog-to-digital conversion ===
KRWG-TV shut down its analog signal, over UHF channel 22, on June 10, 2009 (two days before most full-power television stations in the United States transitioned from analog to digital broadcasts under federal mandate on June 12). The station's digital signal remained on its pre-transition UHF channel 23, using virtual channel 22.
