= International Environmental Design Contest =

Annual competition at New Mexico State University

The International Environmental Design Contest (IEDC) is a competition hosted by the WERC Consortium and The Institute for Energy & The Environment at New Mexico State University. It is an annual event in which student teams prepare written, oral, poster, and bench-scale model presentations in response to design tasks. The student solutions are judged by industry and academic professionals.

== Description ==
The International Environmental Design Contest has been held annually at New Mexico State University in Las Cruces since 1991. The Contest occurs in April and draws college students from around the United States and the world. In the past, the contest has also held concurrent high school design contests.

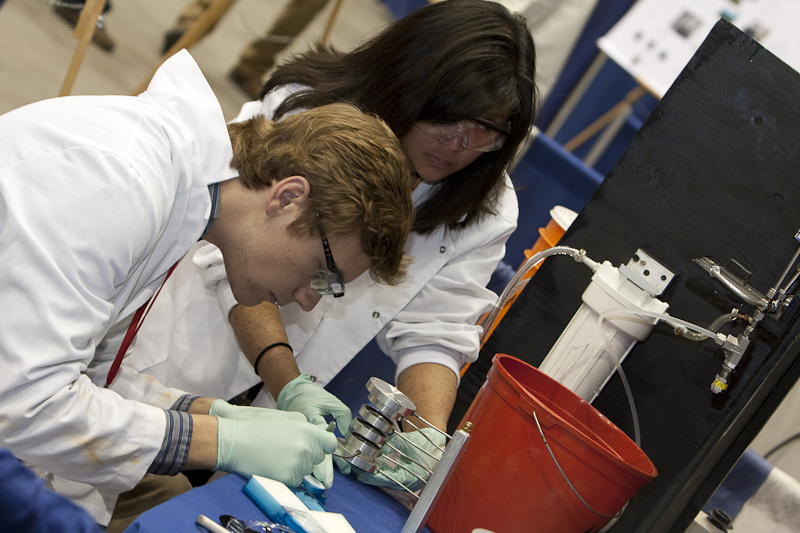
A student prepares a bench-scale demonstration at the International Environmental Design Contest

In response to design tasks posed by the hosting organization, student teams prepare written, oral, poster, and bench-scale model presentations. The design tasks are "based on real-world environmental challenges" and usually relate to water and renewable energy. The challenges are developed with assistance from government agencies, industrial affiliates, and academic partners. These assisting entities also serve as judges for the final competition. Judging criteria includes: process feasibility and practicality, cost analysis, community relations and outreach, adherence to various applicable regulations and permitting, safety considerations, and a discussion of potential waste streams.

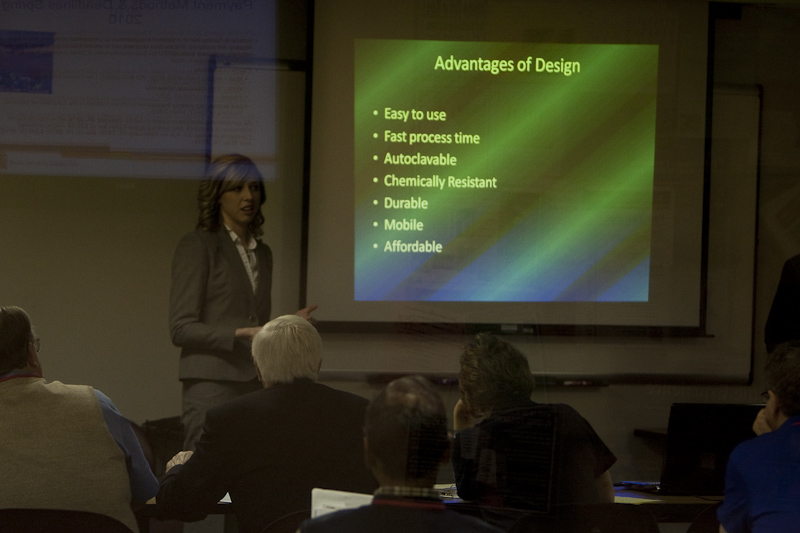
An oral presentation at the International Environmental Design Contest

Students consider alternative solutions to a given “environmental challenge” from all aspects including technical, legal, health, socioeconomic and community related issues. Other considerations include regulatory guidelines, public opinion, and cost. Winning solutions merit cash prizes and traveling trophies.

The Contest is hosted by the Institute for Energy & the Environment at New Mexico State University. The Institute for Energy & the Environment includes: WERC, a Consortium for Environmental Education and Technology Development, Southwest Technology Development Institute, a renewable energy research and development group, and Carlsbad Environmental Monitoring and Research Center, a nuclear waste-management and monitoring center.

The contest is a sponsored event. In 2007, it was sponsored by Intel, the U.S. Department of Energy, the U.S. Food and Drug Administration and the American Water Works Association and Research Foundation. In 2011, the State of New Mexico, Freeport-McMoRan Copper & Gold, Intel Corporation, the Office of Naval Research, the U.S. Bureau of Reclamation, and the U.S. Food and Drug Administration acted as sponsors for the event.

== Tasks ==
In 2003, there were 14 tasks. In 2011, there were seven. Tasks require students "to present design proposals, oral and poster presentations, and working bench-scale models to verify the design, functionality, and cost-effectiveness of their proposed solutions." The tasks are developed from input given by government agencies, industrial affiliates, academic partners to the Institute for Energy and the Environment.

Example Design Contest tasks from 2007:

- Develop a photovoltaic (solar panel) system performance indicator to determine that a residential utility-interactive PV system is operating properly and that the AC power output is following the solar power available to the PV array.
- Develop an inland desalination operation and disposal system for water in rural, isolated communities to demonstrate a low-cost, simple and reliable system.
- Convert a biomass resource to useful forms of energy and other products to demonstrate options using biogas or liquids.

== Awards ==
Cash prizes and traveling trophies are awarded at the Design Contest. Individual awards are also distributed at the event. Awards include Outstanding Award for best oral and paper presentation, the Terry McManus Award, the Intel Innovation award, and first and second place for the various tasks. The following is a listing of Design Contest Awards and their recipients at previous years' competitions:

=== 2014 Design Contest Awards ===
Award	University	Task
First place	Montana Tech. of Univ. of Montana	1
Second place	Roger Williams University	1
First place	University of Idaho	5
Second place	Cal Poly State Univ., San Luis Obispo	5
Freeport-McMoRan Copper & Gold Innovation in Sustainability Award	Montana Tech. of Univ. of Montana Team B	1
Intel Environmental Innovation Award	University of New Hampshire	3
Judges Choice: Team Dynamics	Northern Arizona University	3
IEE Energy Efficiency	Cal Poly State Univ., San Luis Obispo	5
IEE Pollution Prevention	Louisiana State University Team B	1
Peer Award	Roger Williams University	1
Peer Award	Northern Arizona University	2

=== 2011 Design Contest Awards ===
Award	University	Task
First place	University of California- Riverside	Task 6
Second place	University of Arkansas	Task 7
First place	University of Idaho	Task 3
Second place	Roger Williams University	Task 2
Freeport-McMoRan Copper & Gold Innovation in Sustainability Award	University of Waterloo	Task 5
Terry McManus Memorial Award	James Gutierrez	Task 6
Intel Environmental Innovation Award	University of Arkansas	Task 7
Judges Choice: Clean Energy Portable Safe Drinking Water System Award	Louisiana State University	Task 7
Judges Choice: Best Paper Award	Montana Tech	Task 7
Judges Choice: Best Engineering Analysis Award	South Dakota School of Mines and Technology	Task 5
Judges Choice: Innovation & Simplicity of Design Award	University of Idaho	Task 1
Judges Choice: Best Oral Presentation Award	University of Idaho	Task 3

=== 1991 Design Contest Awards ===
Award	University
First Place	New Mexico Tech
Second Place	University of Maryland
Third Place	West Virginia
Best Paper Design	New Mexico Tech
Best Paper Design	University of Maryland
Best Undergraduate Team Design	Arizona State University
Best Bench-Scale Demonstration	New Mexico State University
Most Cost Effective Design	University of New Mexico
Most Creative Design	State University of New York, Buffalo

== Participating teams ==
More than 5000 students have participated in the contest since its beginning. As of 2011, the following universities have attended the International Environmental Design Contest:

- Albuquerque Technical Vocational Institute
- Arizona State University
- California State University, Fullerton
- California State Polytechnic University Pomona
- California State Polytechnic University, San Luis Obispo
- Calvin College
- Case Western Reserve University
- Clarkson University
- Clemson University
- Cleveland State University
- College of Santa Fe
- Colorado School of Mines
- Colorado State University
- Cornell University
- Dalhousie University
- Diné College
- Florida International University
- Louisiana State University
- Lafayette College
- Manhattan College
- Massachusetts Institute of Technology
- Mesa State College
- Institute of Technology
- Michigan State University
- Michigan Technological University
- Mississippi State University
- Montana Tech of the University of Montana
- New Mexico Institute of Mining and Technology
- New Mexico State University
- Mexico State University, Carlsbad
- Northern Arizona University
- North Carolina State University
- Northeastern University
- Ohio State University
- Ohio University
- Oklahoma State University
- Oregon State University
- Pennsylvania State University
- Purdue University
- Santa Clara University
- South Dakota School of Mines and Technology
- Stanford University
- State University of New York
- Texas Tech University
- Tufts University
- University of Akron
- University of Alabama, Huntsville
- University of Alaska, Fairbanks
- University of Arkansas
- University of California, Riverside
- University of Colorado, Boulder
- University of Houston
- University of Idaho
- University of Illinois, Chicago
- University of Maryland
- University of Minnesota, Duluth
- University of Mississippi
- University of Missouri
- University of Nevada, Reno
- University of New Hampshire
- University of New Mexico
- University of Oklahoma
- University of Texas, San Antonio
- University of Tulsa
- University of Georgia
- University of Washington
- University of Wyoming
- Villanova University
- Washington State University, Tri-Cities
- Wayne State University
- Western New England College
- West Virginia University
- Widener University
- Worcester Polytechnic Institute

International Schools

- Boğaziçi University, Turkey
- Budapest Technical University, Hungary
- Dalhousie University, Canada
- Thadomal Shahani Engineering College, India
- United Arab Emirates University, UAE
- Universidad de las Américas, Mexico
- University of Manitoba, Canada
- University of Waterloo, Canada
