= NGC 2986 =

Galaxy in the constellation Hydra

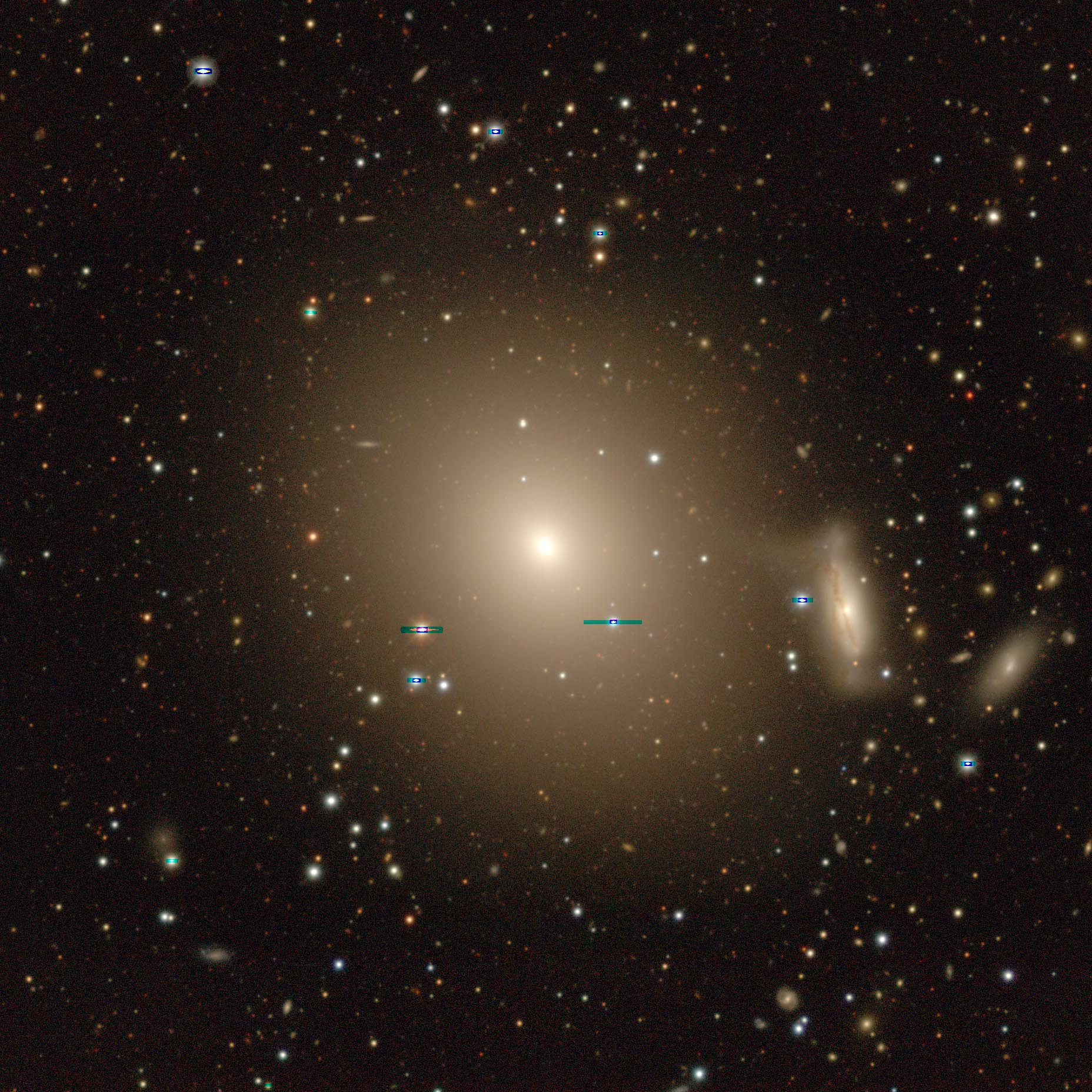
- NGC 2986 imaged by Legacy Surveys

Observation data (J2000 epoch)
- Constellation: Hydra
- Right ascension: 09^{h} 44^{m} 16.0188^{s}
- Declination: −21° 16′ 40.924″
- Redshift: 0.007679±0.000014
- Heliocentric radial velocity: 2,302±4 km/s
- Distance: 116.31 ± 8.30 Mly (35.661 ± 2.544 Mpc)
- Group or cluster: NGC 2935 Group
- Apparent magnitude (V): 11.72

Characteristics
- Type: E2
- Size: ~251,900 ly (77.23 kpc) (estimated)
- Apparent size (V): 3.2′ × 2.8′

Other designations
- ESO 566- G 005, 2MASX J09441604-2116418, UGCA 178, MCG -03-25-019, PGC 27885

NGC 2986 is an elliptical galaxy in the constellation of Hydra. Its velocity with respect to the cosmic microwave background is 2,637±24 km/s, which corresponds to a Hubble distance of 126.8 ± 9.0 Mly (38.89 ± 2.75 Mpc). Additionally, 18 non-redshift measurements give a distance of 116.31 ± 8.30 Mly (35.661 ± 2.544 Mpc). It was discovered by German-British astronomer William Herschel on 10 March 1785.

== NGC 2935 group ==
NGC 2986 is part of a small group of three galaxies, the NGC 2935 group. The other 2 galaxies in this group are NGC 2935 and NGC 2983.

== Supernovae ==
Two supernovae have been observed in NGC 2986:

- SN 1999gh (Type Ia, mag. 14.6) was discovered by Japanese astronomer Kesao Takamizawa on 3 December 1999.
- SN 2025gj (Type Ia, mag. 17.9125) was discovered by the Distance Less Than 40 Mpc Survey (DLT40) on 8 January 2025.

== See also ==
- List of NGC objects (2001–3000)
