= Sierra de las Uvas =

Mountain range in New Mexico, United States

Sierra de las Uvas Wilderness
- IUCN category Ib (wilderness area)
- Location within the United States
- Location: Doña Ana County, New Mexico, USA
- Nearest city: Hatch, New Mexico
- Coordinates: 32.57°N 107.20°W
- Area: 11,114 acres (45 km^{2})
- Established: 2019
- Governing body: U.S. Department of Interior Bureau of Land Management

The Sierra de las Uvas or Grape Mountains are a mountain range in Doña Ana County, New Mexico. The John D. Dingell Jr. Conservation, Management, and Recreation Act, signed March 12, 2019, authorized the establishment of the Sierra de las Uvas Wilderness as a component of the National Wilderness Preservation System, protecting approximately 11,114 acres in the Organ Mountains-Desert Peaks National Monument.
