= Mission Nuestra Señora de Guadalupe =

Spanish mission in New Mexico

By 1659, the Piro Indians had begun settling in the area of Paso del Norte. The Mission Nuestra Señora de Guadalupe was established by Fray García for them. This mission became the southernmost of the New Mexico chain of missions along El Camino Real, which connected Mexico City to Santa Fe. The original structure still exists as a side chapel of the Cathedral of Juarez.

The Piro settlement formed the core of the original Ciudad del El Paso del Norte, which later became La Ciudad de Benito Juárez, located in the present-day state of Chihuahua. The festival that originated there, the Tortugas Pueblo Fiesta of Our Lady of Guadalupe, was later moved Tortugas.

== In the lands of the Manso people ==
From the 15th century, the area of present-day Ciudad Juárez was inhabited by an Indigenous people whose original name is unknown. Juan de Oñate referred to them as the Mansos, the name by which they became known historically. Their territory extended from north of the Rio Grande to the area near Las Cruces, New Mexico, and they lived a semi-nomadic way of life.

In 1629, the Franciscan custodian Alonso de Benavides proposed their evangelization. The following year, friar Antonio de Arteaga began missionary work among them before turning his attention to the Piro, with whom he helped establish the missions of Senecú and Socorro. He was accompanied by García de San Francisco, who later returned to Mexico City to be ordained as a priest.

More sustained missionary efforts among the Mansos began around 1656, when friars Francisco Pérez and Tomás Cabal were sent to the El Paso region. They built a church and gathered a group of Indigenous inhabitants, but internal conflict among the Mansos led them to abandon the mission the following year. García de San Francisco, then serving at the Mission of San Antonio de Senecú, subsequently took an interest in continuing the missionary work among the Mansos of El Paso.

== See also ==
- Spanish missions in New Mexico
