= KRWG (FM) =

- Las Cruces, New Mexico; United States
- Broadcast area: Southeastern New Mexico
- Frequency: 90.7 MHz
- Branding: KRWG Public Media

Programming
- Format: Public radio; news-talk; classical
- Affiliations: National Public Radio; American Public Media; Public Radio Exchange; WFMT Classical Network

Ownership
- Owner: Regents of New Mexico State University
- Sister stations: KRWG-TV

History
- First air date: October 3, 1964
- Call sign meaning: Ralph Willis Goddard, 1920s university radio professor

Technical information
- Licensing authority: FCC
- Facility ID: 55515
- Class: C1
- ERP: 100,000 watts
- HAAT: 107 meters (351 ft)
- Transmitter coordinates: 32.2568°N 106.9767°W
- Translators: 89.5 K208AS (Alamogordo); 91.9 K220AN (Truth or Consequences); 91.9 K220AO (Lordsburg); 93.5 K228DK (Deming)
- Repeater: 91.3 KRXG (Silver City)

Links
- Public license information: Public file; LMS
- Webcast: Listen live
- Website: krwg.org

KRWG (90.7 MHz) is a non-commercial, listener-supported, public radio station in Las Cruces, New Mexico. KRWG is sister station to KRWG-TV, a PBS station. They are owned by the Regents of New Mexico State University, with offices and studios in Milton Hall on McFie Circle.

KRMG is a Class C1 station. It has an effective radiated power (ERP) of 100,000 watts, the maximum for most FM stations. The transmitter is on Speedway Road off Robert Larson Boulevard in Las Cruces, near Interstate 10. The signal covers Southeastern New Mexico and parts of the El Paso metropolitan area and the state of Chihuahua, Mexico. Programming is simulcast on 91.3 KRXG in Silver City and on several FM translators around New Mexico.

== Programming ==
KRWG airs a mix of news programs from NPR and other public radio networks, along with classical music, jazz and Latin contemporary music. On weekdays, national news and information shows include Morning Edition, All Things Considered, Fresh Air and Here and Now. Weekday classical shows include Performance Today and Intermezzo with Peter van de Graaff and Leora Zeitlin. Each weekday evening, the bilingual show Fiesta is heard, featuring a variety of Latin popular music. That is followed by jazz until midnight and programming from the WFMT Classical Network overnight.

Weekends feature specialty shows. One-hour weekly information programs include This American Life, Travel with Rick Steves, Hidden Brain, Latino USA, Reveal, The TED Radio Hour, It's Been A Minute, Milk Street Radio and Wait, Wait, Don't Tell Me. National weekend music programs include Mountain Stage, The Thistle and Shamrock, Hearts of Space, American Routes and World Cafe.

== History ==
KRWG signed on the air on October 3, 1964. It was originally powered at only 740 watts. It served as a college radio station for students training for careers in broadcasting. Its city of license was University Park, New Mexico, a community within the campus of New Mexico State University.

The call letters represent the initials of Ralph Willis Goddard. He was the dean of the Engineering School at New Mexico College of Agriculture and Mechanic Arts, the original name of New Mexico State University. Goddard was responsible for the founding of KOB radio). Before that station moved to Albuquerque, it was owned by the college and it broadcast in Las Cruces. Goddard was electrocuted in 1929 while working on the KOB transmitter.

In the 1970s, KRWG changed its city of license to Las Cruces. The station moved to its current frequency and got an increase in tower height and power, becoming a full Class C1 FM station. It also became a member of National Public Radio (NPR), airing NPR news shows along with classical and jazz music. Over the years, news and information has played a larger role in the station's schedule, with music programs still heard in middays, evenings and weekends.
