= New Mexico State University =

Public university in Las Cruces, New Mexico, US

Coordinates: 32.283°N 106.748°W

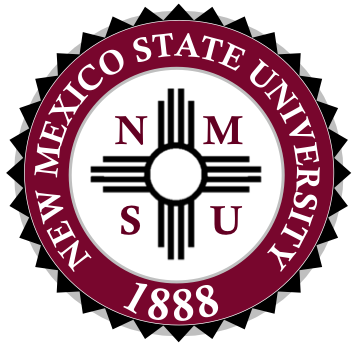
- Former names: Las Cruces College (1888–1889); New Mexico College of Agriculture and Mechanic Arts (1889–1960)
- Type: Public land-grant research university
- Established: September 17, 1888; 138 years ago
- Accreditation: HLC
- Academic affiliations: CONAHEC; URA; Space-grant
- Endowment: $421.5 million (2025)
- President: Valerio Ferme
- Faculty: 1,806
- Students: 23,888 (total headcount); 16,076 (Las Cruces campus)
- Undergraduates: 13,039 (Las Cruces campus)
- Postgraduates: 3,037 (Las Cruces campus)
- Location: Las Cruces address, New Mexico, United States
- Campus: 900 acres (360 ha); Midsize suburb
- Colors: Crimson and white Turquoise (unofficial)
- Nickname: Aggies
- Sporting affiliations: NCAA Division I FBS – CUSA
- Mascot: Pistol Pete
- Website: www.nmsu.edu

New Mexico State University (NMSU or NM State) is a public, land-grant, research university in University Park, New Mexico, United States, in the Las Cruces area. Founded in 1888, it is the state's oldest public institution of higher education, and was the original land-grant university in the region. NMSU is a university system, with its main campus in Las Cruces and satellite campuses in Alamogordo, Doña Ana County, and Grants. Through the NMSU Cooperative Extension Service, it has centers or programs in all 33 counties in the state.

Initially established as Las Cruces College, NMSU was designated a land-grant college in 1889 and renamed New Mexico College of Agriculture and Mechanic Arts; it received its present name in 1960. NMSU offers over 180 degree programs, including 28 doctoral, 58 master's, and 96 baccalaureate programs. It had approximately 22,711 enrolled in Fall 2024, with a faculty-to-student ratio of roughly 1 to 16. New Mexico State's athletic teams, the Aggies, compete at the NCAA Division I level in Conference USA.

NMSU has a research activity designation of "R1: Doctoral Universities – Very High Research Spending and Doctorate Production". NMSU is the lead institute for the New Mexico National Space Grant Consortium.

== History ==
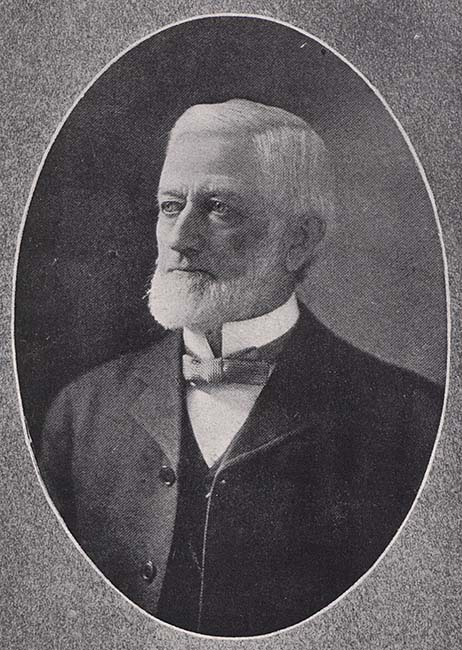
Hiram Hadley

Hiram Hadley, an Earlham College-educated teacher from Indiana, founded Las Cruces College. Upon its opening on September 17, 1888, it included an elementary school, a university preparatory school, and a business school; it "was not a college in the contemporary meaning of the word."

A year later, the Territorial Assembly of New Mexico provided for the establishment of an agricultural college and agricultural experiment station with the Rodey Act of 1889. It stated: "Said institution is hereby located at or near the town of Las Cruces in the County of Doña Ana, upon a tract of land of not less than one hundred (100) acres." Designated as the land-grant college for New Mexico under the Morrill Act, it was named the New Mexico College of Agriculture and Mechanic Arts.

Las Cruces College merged with the New Mexico College of Agriculture and Mechanical Arts and opened on January 21, 1890. It began with 35 students and six faculty members. The college was supposed to graduate its first student in 1893, but the only senior, Sam Steel, was murdered before he was able to receive his diploma. Classes met in the two-room adobe building of Las Cruces College until new buildings were erected on the 220-acre (0.89 km^{2}) campus three miles (5 km) south of Las Cruces. In February 1891, McFie Hall, popularly known as Old Main, opened its doors.

In 1960, to better represent its expanded programs and operations, New Mexico A&M was renamed New Mexico State University.

== Organization and administration ==
Regulated by the New Mexico Constitution, the Regents of New Mexico State University are a corporate body that implements legislation over the control and management of NMSU. The board is made of up five persons appointed by the governor of New Mexico with the consent of the senate.

Full-time faculty members number 840, with a staff of 3,113.

=== Presidents ===
"The president is the chief executive officer of the university system and is charged with responsibility for providing strategic direction and general supervision over all affairs of the university."

The following persons served as president of New Mexico State University:

No.	Image	President	Term start	Term end	Refs.
1		Hiram Hadley	1888	1894	
2		Samuel P. McCrea	1894	1896	
3		Cornelius T. Jordan	1896	1899	
4		Frederic W. Sanders	1899	1901	
5		Luther Foster	1901	1908	
6		Winfred E. Garrison	1908	1913	
7		George E. Ladd	1913	1917	
8		Austin D. Crile	1917	1920	
9		Robert W. Clothier	1920	1921	
10		Harry L. Kent	1921	1936	
11		Ray Fife	1936	1938	
12		Hugh M. Milton II	1938	1947	
13		John R. Nichols	1947	1949	
14		John W. Branson	1949	1955	
15		Roger B. Corbett	1955	1970	
16		Gerald W. Thomas	1970	1984	
17		James E. Halligan	1984	1994	
interim		William B. Conroy	1994	1995	
18		J. Michael Orenduff	1995	1997	
19		William B. Conroy	1997	2000	
20		G. Jay Gogue	July 1, 2000	2003	
21 interim		William V. Flores	2003	June 30, 2004	
22		Michael V. Martin	July 1, 2004	July 31, 2008	
23 interim		Waded Cruzado	August 1, 2008	May 31, 2009	
24 interim		Manuel T. Pacheco	June 1, 2009	December 31, 2009	
25		Barbara Couture	January 1, 2010	September 30, 2012	
26 interim		Manuel T. Pacheco	October 10, 2012	May 5, 2013	
27		Garrey Carruthers	May 6, 2013	June 30, 2018	
28; Main campus president (Note: In 2018, the NMSU regents split the duties of president between a system chancellor and a main campus president. In 2022, Floros resigned as president and the two offices were recombined.)		John Floros	July 1, 2018	January 7, 2022	
29; System chancellor		Dan Arvizu (Note: Arvizu became in charge of the main campus on January 7, 2022 and the 29th leader of the main campus.)	July 1, 2018	April 5, 2023	
30 interim (Note: Title changed back from chancellor to president during 2023–2024)		G. Jay Gogue	April 7, 2023	April 30, 2024	
31 interim		Monica Torres	May 1, 2024	December 31, 2024	
32		Valerio Ferme	January 1, 2025	Present	

Table notes:

== Campus ==
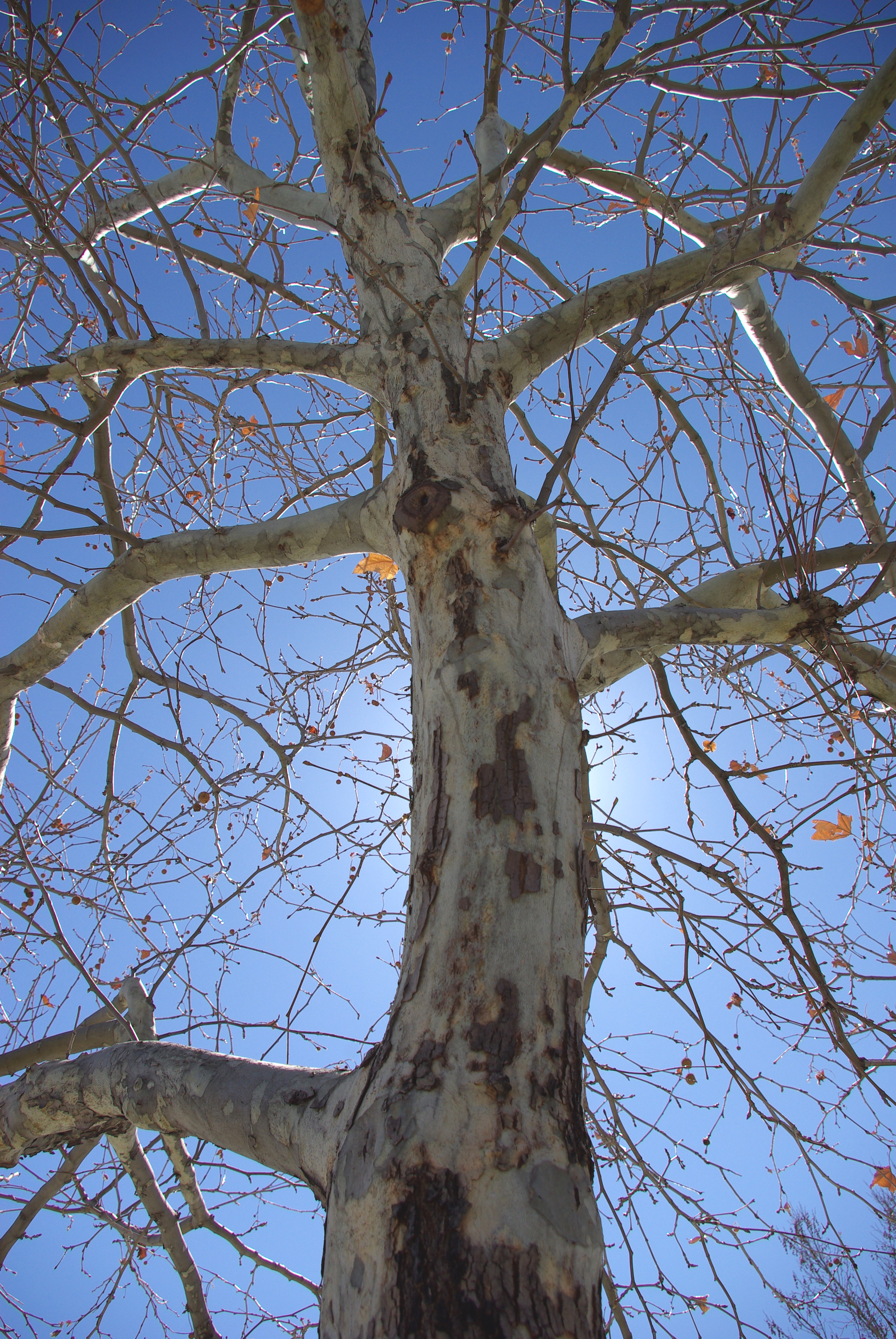
London plane tree in NMSU

The main campus of New Mexico State University occupies a core of 900 acres (360 ha), adjacent to but not within the city limits of Las Cruces. It is located adjacent to Interstate 25, surrounded by desert landscape and greenhouses. The main campus is also bordered by Interstate 10, which is the main east–west interstate highway across the southern part of the United States. To the east of Interstate 25, the campus facilities consist of the President's residence, NMSU Golf Course, the "A" Mountain west slope, and the New Mexico Farm and Ranch Heritage Museum. South of University Avenue are Pan American Plaza, 48 acres of horse farm, and the Fabian Garcia Science center, which houses the Chile Pepper Institute's research, teaching and demonstration garden, algal biofuels research equipment, grape vineyards and gazebos, and fields and greenhouses for plant research projects. About six miles south of campus, on 203 acres of land, is the Leyendecker Plant Science Research Center.

The Las Cruces campus is home to a nesting population of Swainson's hawks, a raptor species currently protected by federal law. Pedestrians are advised to be careful when walking on Stewart Street, as the birds can be aggressive during nesting season.

The first master plan of the university was to create a "horseshoe", a U-shaped drive, in an open large lawn. At the center was Old Main, the original campus building, originally known as McFie Hall, which was destroyed by fire in 1910 (the remains are now a college landmark). The cornerstone and remains of Mcfie Hall stand near the flagpole in the middle of the horseshoe. Today, the horseshoe is the center of campus and is the location of the main administration building, Hadley Hall, which sits at the top of the horseshoe, and other classroom buildings.

NMSU is a land-grant institution with a presence in all 33 counties of New Mexico, a satellite learning center in Albuquerque, 13 research and science centers, distance education opportunities, and five campuses in Alamogordo, Carlsbad, Grants, Doña Ana County, and Las Cruces.

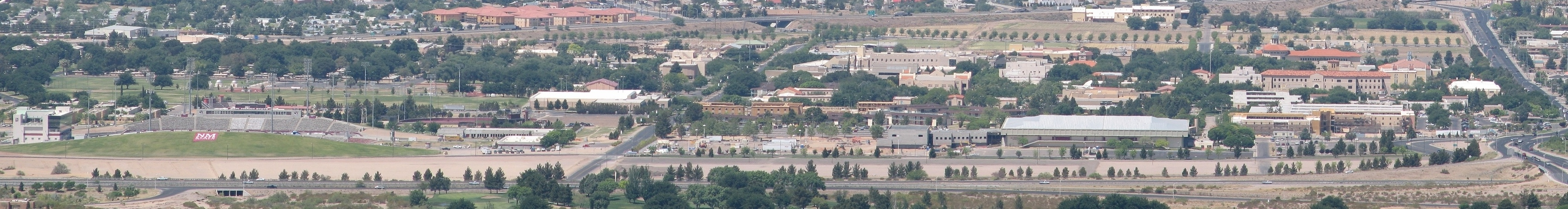
New Mexico State University's main campus, with Aggie Memorial Stadium on the left, and the primary "colleges" on the right, along University Avenue

=== Medical school ===
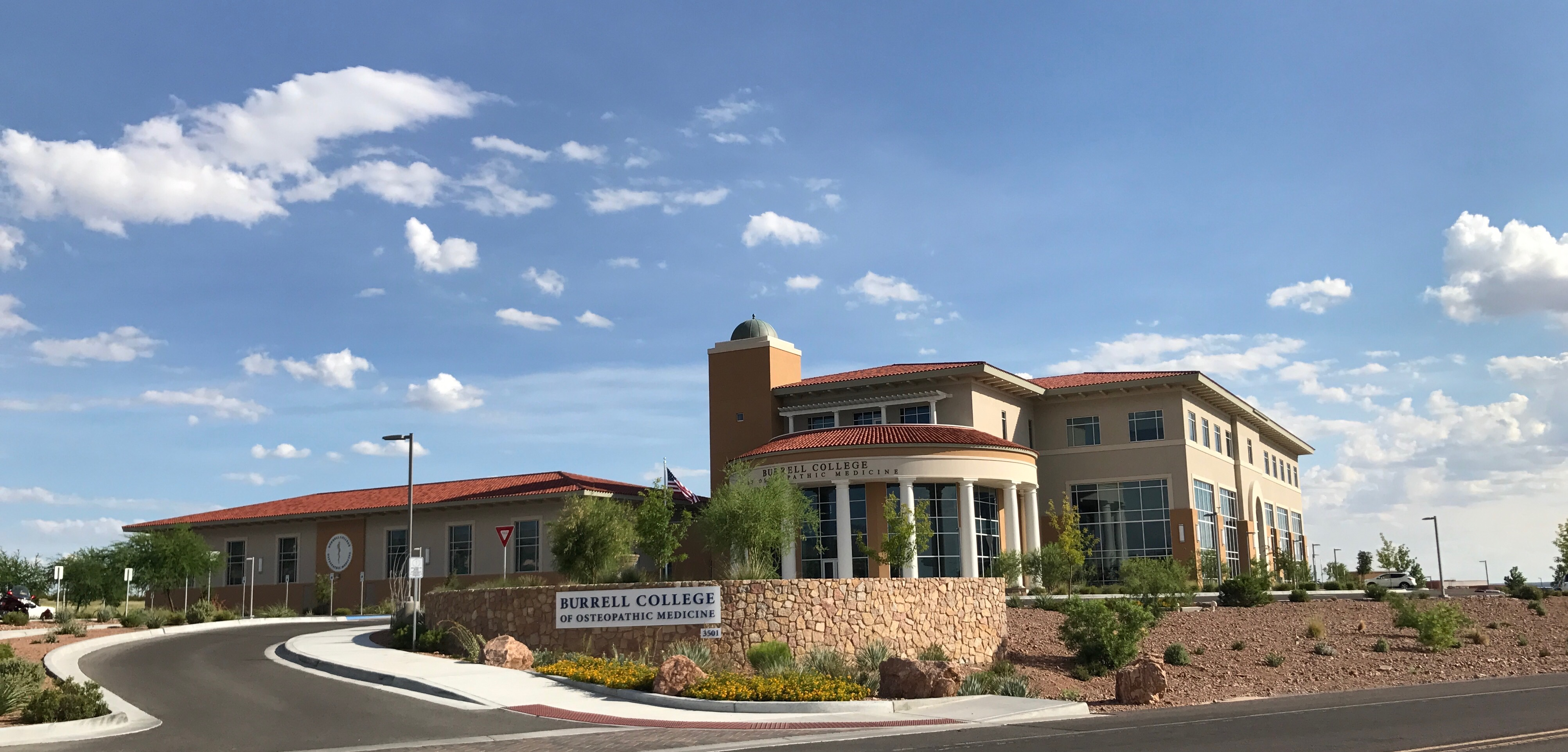
Burrell College of Osteopathic Medicine at New Mexico State University

The Burrell College of Osteopathic Medicine at New Mexico State University (BCOM), a private medical school, is located on NMSU's main campus. Medical students can utilize the facilities and amenities of NMSU's campus, including on-campus student housing. BCOM began instruction in August 2016 and graduated its first class in May 2020. BCOM and NMSU created a pipeline program whereby qualified NMSU students are guaranteed a seat at the medical school following graduating from NMSU. BCOM is the first osteopathic medical school in New Mexico and just one of two medical schools in the state, the other being in Albuquerque at the University of New Mexico.

=== Libraries ===
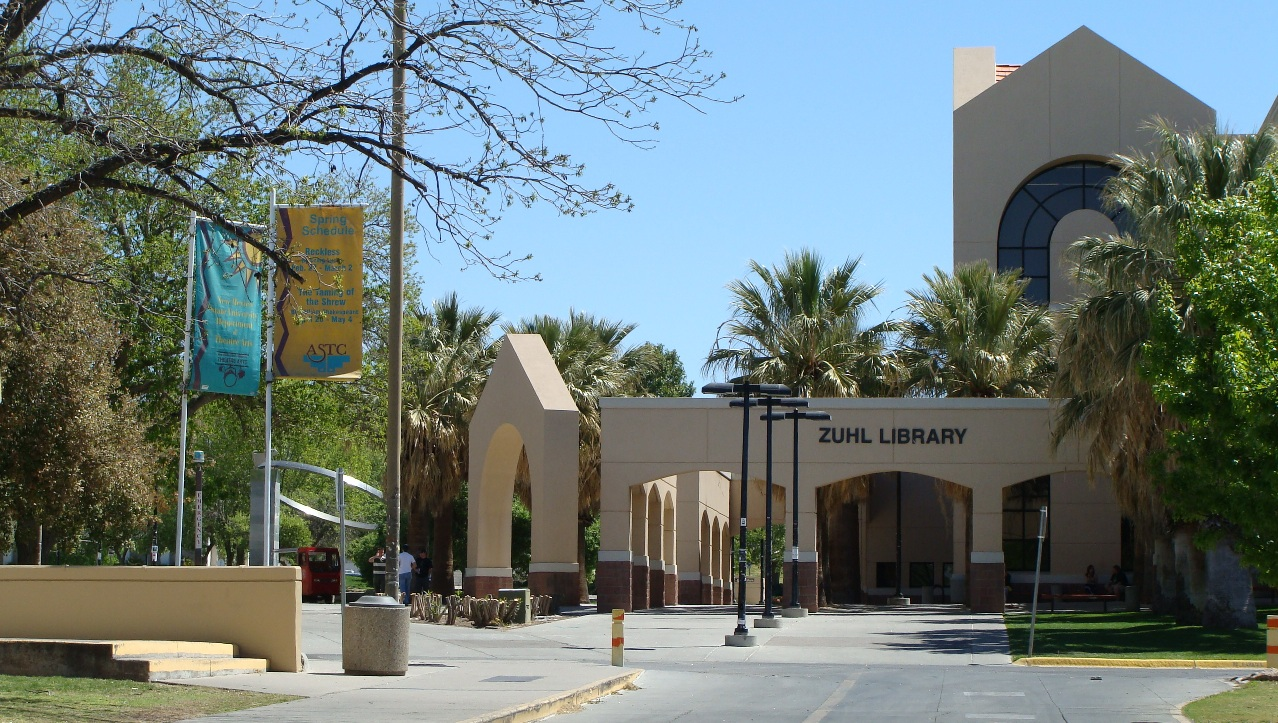
Zuhl Library

NMSU has two major libraries on the main campus, Branson Hall Library and Zuhl Library. Both libraries have a total collection of more than 1 million volumes.

==== Branson Hall Library ====
Branson Hall Library was built in 1951 and houses texts and resources related to engineering, business, agriculture, science, special collections, maps, government publications, and archives.

The New Mexico State University Library, part of the Branson Hall Library, is an official depository for documents produced by United States and State of New Mexico government agencies. The federal government established a system of depositories in 1813 in order to provide government information to the public free of charge. The New Mexico State University Library joined the depository program in 1907.

==== Zuhl Library ====
Zuhl Library was built in 1992. The library houses texts and resources related to the arts, humanities, and sciences.

=== Museums and collections ===
NMSU is home to several museums, collections, and galleries. The NMSU Arthropod Museum, which houses more than 150,000 research and 5,000 teaching specimens, is housed in Skeen Hall. Specimens are used globally for taxonomic research and within the state for community outreach. The University Museum (established in 1959) serves the community as a repository and exhibitor of local and regional culture and history. The Klipsch Museum contains materials representing more than 80 years of audio engineering. The Zuhl Collection combines the functions of an art gallery and natural history museum and showcases thousands of specimens of petrified wood, fossils, and minerals.

== Academics ==
The NMSU faculty senate consists of 70 elected faculty and has shared governance over academic policies across the NMSU system. Fifty NMSU faculty members are named among the world's top 2 percent of scientists worldwide, according to Stanford University and Elsevier.

NMSU offers a wide variety of programs across multiple disciplines, including agriculture, education, engineering, and the sciences. There are 58 master's degree programs, 96 baccalaureate degree programs, and 28 doctoral programs. Over 4,400 courses are available across 54 academic departments.

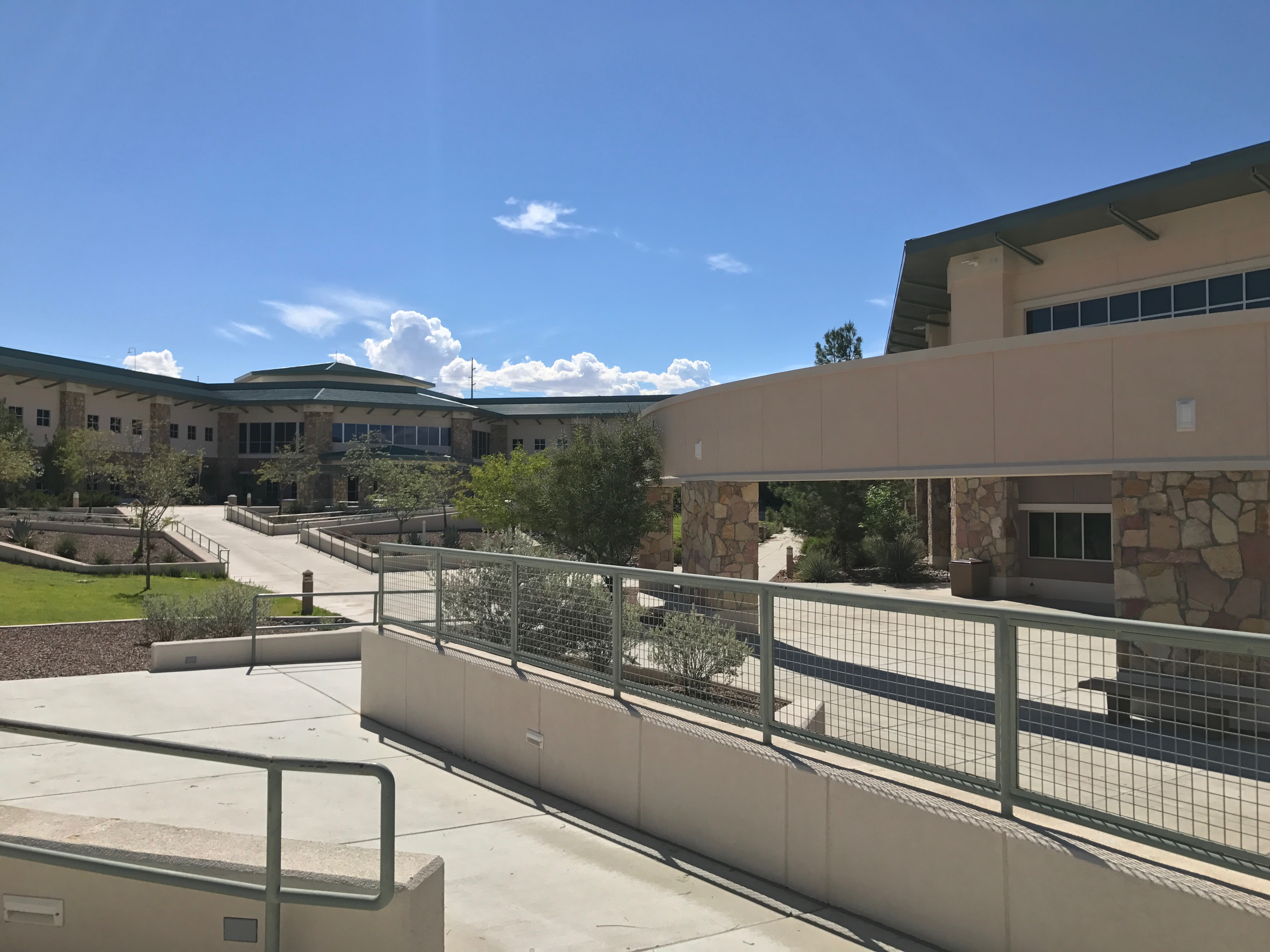
Dona Ana Community College is a branch of NMSU.

In addition to the main campus in Las Cruces, NMSU has community colleges in Alamogordo, Doña Ana County, and Grants, through which it offers academic, vocational/technical, and continuing education programs. In accord with its land-grant mission, the university provides informal, off-campus educational programs through the Cooperative Extension Service. Through a statewide network of nine research facilities, the Agricultural Experiment Station conducts basic and applied research supporting agriculture, natural resources management, environmental quality, and improved quality of life.

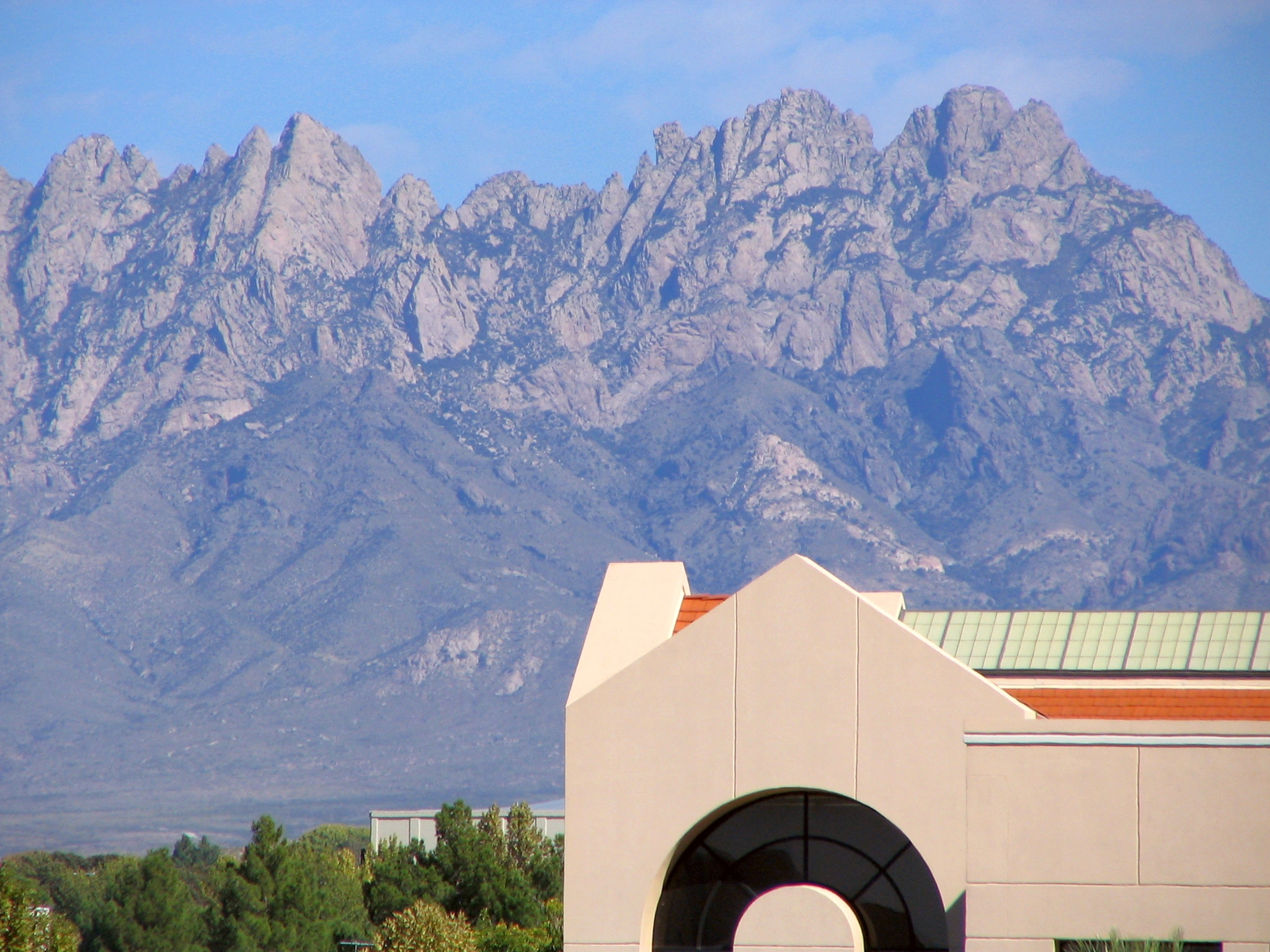
Zuhl Library with Organ Mountains in the background

NMSU is divided into six colleges and a graduate school:

- College of Agricultural, Consumer and Environmental Sciences
- College of Arts and Sciences
- College of Business
- College of Engineering
- College of Health, Education and Social Transformation
- Honors College
- Graduate School

=== Reputation and rankings ===
Academic rankings

National
- Forbes: 418
- U.S. News & World Report: 222
- Washington Monthly: 130
- WSJ/College Pulse: 401-500

Global
- QS: 1201-1400
- THE: 601-800
- U.S. News & World Report: 951

In the 2026 college rankings by U.S. News & World Report, NMSU ranked 222nd among National Universities, making NMSU the best undergraduate public institution in the state ahead of University of New Mexico which is ranked 242nd. USN&WR ranked several programs among the top 200 in the nation, including the college of engineering's graduate program at 149, the nursing school's master's program tied at 139 and doctoral program at 109, and the college of education's graduate program tied at 125. Forbes listed NMSU as one of "America's Top Colleges in 2021", based on indicators such as alumni salary, debt, return on investment, and graduation rate. In 2022, NMSU was among the top 35 percent of schools in the Social Mobility Index rankings.

In 2021, NMSU was recognized as one of the top 100 colleges and universities for Hispanics by Hispanic Outlook on Education Magazine. A 2017 report by the National Science Foundation's National Center for Science and Engineering Statistics ranked NMSU first for federal funding for science and engineering activities among minority-serving institutions. In 2016, NMSU was among the top ten universities in awarding bachelor's degrees to Hispanics, including for communications technologies/technicians and support services (seventh); agriculture, agriculture operations and related sciences (eighth); hospitality administration/management (ninth); engineering technologies and engineering-related fields (tenth); and education (tenth). The school also ranked among the top ten universities in conferring bachelor's degrees to Native Americans and ninth for awarding bachelor's degrees to minorities overall for agriculture, agriculture operations, and related sciences.

In 2024, New Mexico State University was ranked 16 in the nation by Washington Monthly for its support of women in STEM fields, particularly in Chemical Engineering.

== Institutes and research programs ==
=== Research programs ===
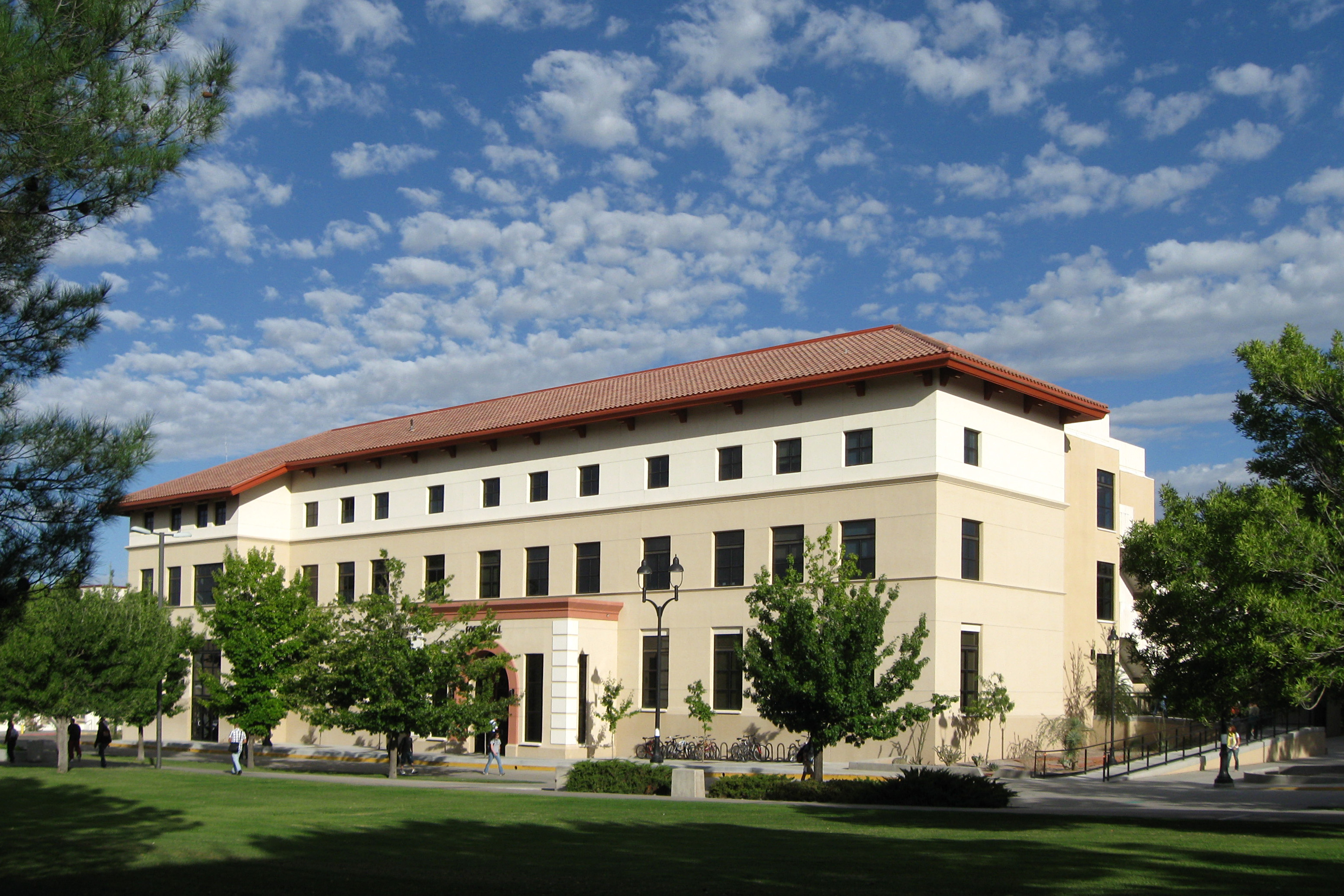
Foster Hall is home to the Department of Biology.

The university is the lead institution for New Mexico's Space Grant Program.

In 2010, the NMSU Physical Sciences Laboratory secured a study contract with Reaction Engines Limited, a British aerospace company that is developing technology for an airbreathing single stage to orbit, precooled air turboramjet based spaceplane.

The NMSU Department of Astronomy operates the Sunspot Solar Observatory and Apache Point Observatory, in Sunspot, New Mexico, including the site of the Sloan Digital Sky Survey.

NMSU is a research active university, with $150 million per year in externally funded research programs. Its estimated annual economic impact in New Mexico is $1 billion. Anchoring the southern end of New Mexico's Rio Grande Research Corridor, NMSU is the only university to reach the platinum, or highest, level of service to NASA's Space Alliance Technology Outreach Program. SATOP makes the expertise of corporate and university researchers available to small businesses.

=== Academic centers and research institutes ===
- Agricultural Experiment Station – conducts basic and applied research supporting agriculture, natural resources management, environmental quality, and improved quality of life.
- Arrowhead Center – provides business assistance, technology incubation, intellectual property commercialization, economic policy analysis to local businesses as well as students, staff and faculty at the university.
- Institute for Energy and Environment (IEE) – a multidisciplinary, energy sector and water resource institute. IEE's goal is to provide global leadership, expertise, and technology for public policy, technical and human resource development to meet growing energy and water needs. The International Environmental Design Contest is co-hosted by the IEE.
- Manufacturing Technology and Engineering Center (M-TEC) – supports economic development in New Mexico by providing manufacturing education, technical assistance, and other extension services to industries in New Mexico.

== Student life ==
Undergraduate demographics as of Fall 2023
Race and ethnicity	Total
Hispanic	63%
White	25%
American Indian/Alaska Native	3%
Two or more races	3%
Black	2%
International student	2%
Asian	1%
Unknown	1%
Economic diversity
Low-income (Note: The percentage of students who received an income-based federal Pell grant intended for low-income students.)	43%
Affluent (Note: The percentage of students who are a part of the American middle class at the bare minimum.)	57%

New Mexico State University enrolls more than 21,000 students from the United States and 71 foreign countries.

=== Student organizations ===
NMSU student organizations include a Greek system and several religious organizations. A list of current student organizations can be found on Crimson Connection.

=== The Associated Students of New Mexico State University ===
The Associated Students of New Mexico State University (ASNMSU) is the student government and is considered a departmental organization. It consists of an elected student body president, vice president, 30 senators, and an appointed student supreme court. Senators are elected to two-semester terms, with two elections each school year, in each, 15 senators are elected. There are 12 different departments within ASNMSU, that manage various events such as the homecoming parade, free student concerts, a free cab program for students, and many others. Each department is overseen by a director, who is appointed by the president and confirmed by the senate. ASNMSU manages a budget of over $1 million.

=== Greek life ===
There are numerous fraternities and sororities at New Mexico State University, with over 600 active affiliated members on campus. The Kappa Sigma fraternity was suspended in 2020 after a student was shot during hazing.

=== Media ===
Founded in 1907, The Round Up is the oldest student-run news publication at New Mexico State University. In fall 2017, it reduced its printing frequency and now provides current online news coverage as well as special print editions.

KRWG-TV is a full-service television station in Las Cruces, New Mexico, and is operated and owned by New Mexico State University. It is a member station of PBS (Public Broadcasting Service).

Puerto del Sol is a literary magazine run by graduate students in the English Department. It has been in print for over fifty years and currently publishes biannually. The magazine also curates a Black Voices series on its website.

News22 is a student-run television newscast that airs live on KRWG-TV three days per week during the nine-month academic year. The broadcast is produced by New Mexico State University journalism students. In 2011, News22 added Noticias22 en Español, a Spanish language broadcast that airs Tuesdays and Wednesdays in Las Cruces, Silver City and El Paso, Texas.

Kokopelli is an online news publication produced by New Mexico State University journalism students. It provides breaking news, features and weekly sports coverage during the nine-month academic year. Kokopelli is a member of the Associated Collegiate Press.

NMSU owns and operates two radio stations: KRUX (91.5 FM) and KRWG-FM. KRUX is entirely student–run and non-commercial; it was founded in 1989. KRUX is financed through student fees. KRWG-FM (90.7 FM) is a public, non-commercial, full-service FM radio station. It serves the area within southwestern New Mexico and Far West Texas. It is an affiliated station of National Public Radio and features NPR programming.

== Traditions ==
=== Aggies ===
The nickname was derived from its roots and beginnings as an agricultural school and the state's only designated land-grant university.

=== Victory Bell ===
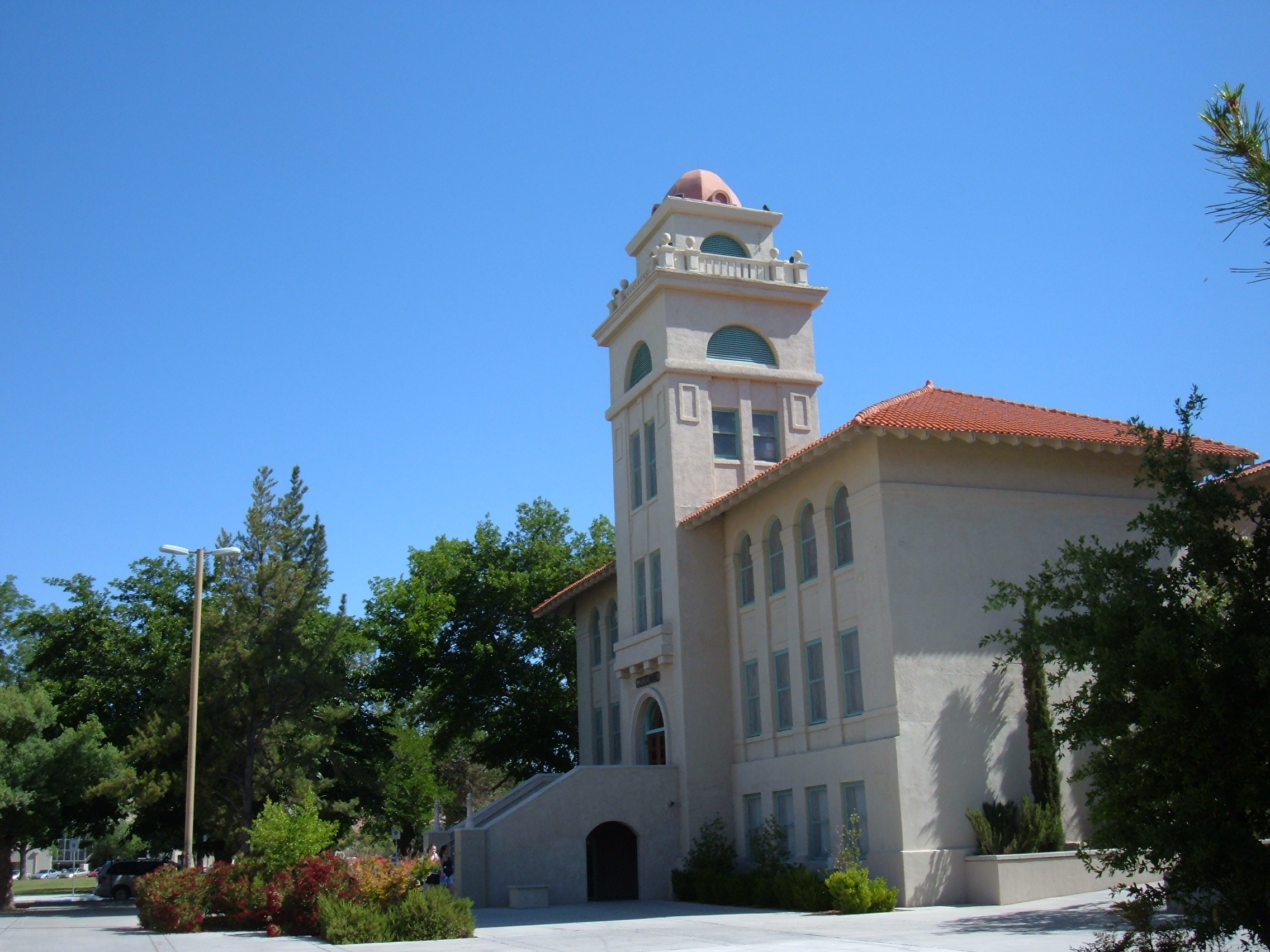
Goddard Hall

In the 1940s, the Victory Bell, a gift of the Class of 1939, was housed in an open-sided structure on the Horseshoe and rung to announce Aggie victories. In 1972, the bell was rededicated as the NMSU Engineer's Bell and mounted on a platform near Goddard Hall. On game days, various school organizations took turns in toting the ringing bell around Las Cruces before kick-off. The bell was then taken to Aggie Memorial Stadium where it rang after Aggie touchdowns. More recently, the bell has been permanently mounted at field level just behind the south goalpost.

=== "A" tradition ===
In 1920, students of then New Mexico College of Agriculture and Mechanic Arts scouted for an appropriate place to display their school letter. Tortugas Mountain, located three miles (5 km) east of campus and associated with the Piro, Manso, and Tiwa tribe members of Tortugas Pueblo, seemed a natural spot. Students gathered enough stones to form a big "A" easily visible from campus and the surrounding area. On the following day, April 1, they trudged up the mountain side with their five-gallon cans of whitewash and splashed it on the stones, turning them into a white "A". For many years, giving the "A" its annual fresh coat of whitewash was an all-school effort. The seniors mixed lime and water at the foot of the mountain and the freshmen and sophomores toted the mixture up to the juniors who splashed it on the "A." With the growth of the university through the years, the tradition was taken over by the Greek Council.

=== The Pride of New Mexico Marching Band ===
The marching band of New Mexico State University is known as the Pride of New Mexico. It is composed of approximately 200 musicians, dancers, and auxiliary.

=== The Wonder Dog ===
At kickoff of every NMSU home football game, Aggie fans await the "Wonder Dog" to retrieve the kicking tee from the football field. This tradition started in the mid-1990s. The first "Wonder Dog" was Smoki, a Border Collie-Australian shepherd mix born in Capitan, New Mexico, and trained by Joel Sims, an NMSU alumnus. Smoki "The Wonder Dog" entertained the Aggie crowd for six years and retired in 2002. She also debuted in a Hollywood film which co-starred Kevin Costner and Dennis Quaid, entitled "Wyatt Earp", as a town dog. Smoki "The Wonder Dog" died at the age of 15 in 2005. Since then, the tradition ended until 2012, when a tryout for the next "Wonder Dog" took place. A panel of celebrity judges chose a four-year old Border Collie, Striking as the next "Wonder Dog". Striking first appeared on August 30, 2012, at the NMSU-Sacramento State home game.

=== Crimson Fridays ===
Every Friday, some students, faculties, staff, and alumni of NMSU wear crimson colors to show support for the university and the school's sports programs.

=== NMSU ring ===
The official ring of New Mexico State University is given to students with junior and senior standing, and alumni of NMSU, to celebrate and commemorate their achievements and NMSU traditions. The official Ring Ceremony is sponsored by the Alumni Association, which is held every spring and fall Semester at the Aggie Memorial Tower.

The official ring is manufactured by Balfour, which comes with white gold and yellow gold, with an optional stone; diamond or cubic zirconia at the centerpiece of the ring; and is presented with Hatch Chile Ristra. The top of the ring highlights the NMSU three triangles school seal, encircled with the school name. The three triangles represent NMSU's role as a land-grant university – teaching, research, and service. It also represents the connection of Spanish, American Indian, and Anglo cultures in New Mexico, and the triangulation of NMSU campus with Interstate 10 linking Interstate 25 in the first principal interchange of the Pan American Highway in North America. The one side of the ring shows the Aggie Memorial Tower, in honor of Aggies who died for the country, and the other side of the ring displays the majestic Organ Mountains. Students wear the ring facing the school name. Upon granting of degrees, graduates should turn the ring around facing outward, which symbolizes that they are ready to face the world.

=== Noche de Luminarias ===
A tradition that signals the beginning of the holiday season is the "Noche de Luminarias" or "Night of Lights". A university tradition that started as the President's Holiday Reception in 1984, which starts the holiday season with a night of entertainment and festivities. It is considered one of the largest luminaria displays in the state of New Mexico. Each candle set is lit inside a paper bag. With more than 6,000 luminarias, it begins at the Educational Services Building, extends towards the International Mall and then encircles the Corbett Center Student Union. The display is set up by the Las Cruces High School band and accompanies visitors as they walk through the lighted path by the Las Cruces High School Brass Choir.

== Athletics ==
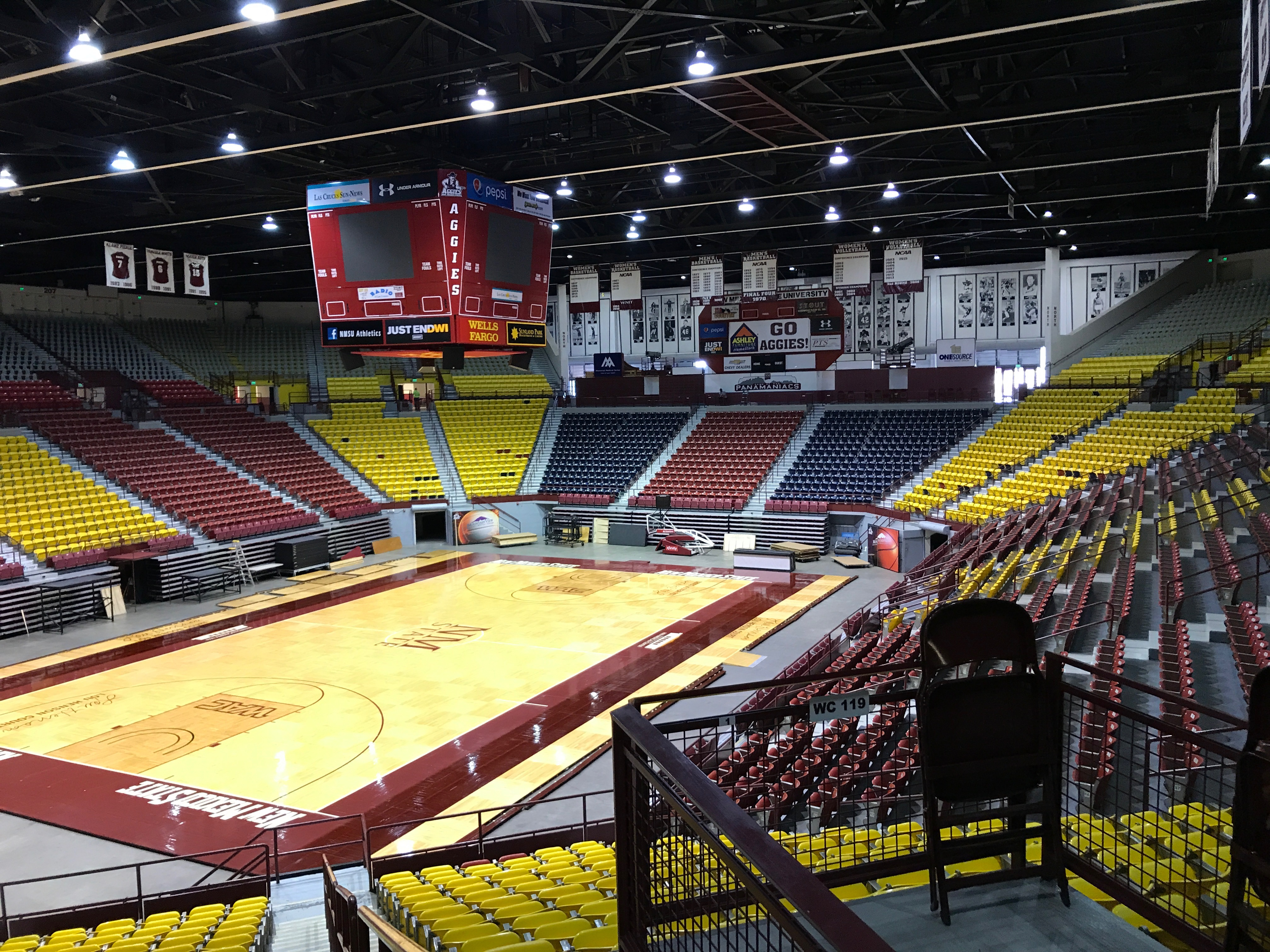
Pan American Center

NMSU's teams are called the Aggies, a nickname derived from the university's agricultural beginnings.

New Mexico State is a member of Conference USA (C-USA), as of July 1, 2023. Conference USA is the sixth conference NMSU has been affiliated with in its football history. New Mexico State spent the past eighteen seasons as a member of the Western Athletic Conference (WAC). Before that, NMSU was a member of the Big West Conference, Sun Belt Conference, Missouri Valley Conference and the Border Conference.

In 2023, two basketball players complained of sexual assault during hazing rituals. Deuce Benjamin settled out of court for $4.125 million, Shak Odunewu settled out of court for $3.875 million, and the case was dropped with no verdict. As a result of the investigation, the head coach Greg Heiar was fired and students were found guilty of a Title VI violation by the university and were removed. A criminal case against those students who were on the 2022-23 basketball team, is still ongoing. A second lawsuit was filed against the university, the athletic director and several coaches and students, alleging the presence of guns on campus and hazing, and that the coach was aware but failed to act, all in violation of university policy.

The Women's Equestrian Team was first established in 2004 and cut following the 2016–2017 season due to budget cuts.

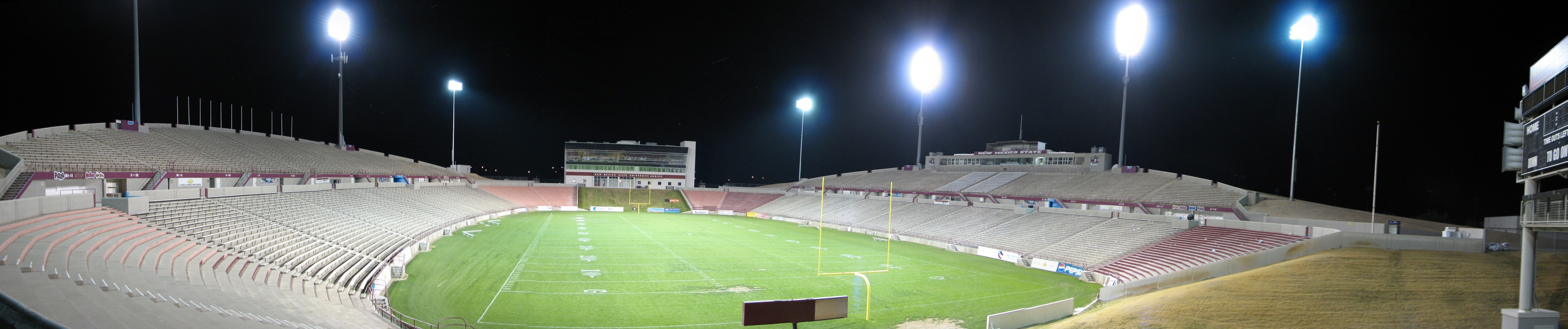
NMSU Aggie Memorial Stadium

=== Rivalries ===
NMSU maintains strong athletic rivalries with the University of New Mexico. The UNM-NMSU rivalry is called the Rio Grande Rivalry (aka Battle of I-25), a competitive series based on points awarded to the winners of head-to-head competitions between the two universities in every sport. A rotating trophy is granted to the winning university for a period of one year, until the award presentation the following year. Different traditions take place at each school the night before game day.

The university also has a strong rivalry with the University of Texas at El Paso known as The Battle of I-10. UTEP and NMSU are located just over 40 miles apart.

== Notable people ==
=== Alumni ===
There are approximately 120,000 living NMSU alumni. The NMSU Alumni Association is one of the university's oldest organizations, dating from May 24, 1898.

==== Notable alumni ====
- Kevin Johnson, president and CEO of Starbucks Corporation;
- Paul Wilbur Klipsch, founder of Klipsch Audio Technologies;
- Jorge Gardea-Torresdey, nanoparticle researcher and professor at the University of Texas at El Paso;
- Alvy Ray Smith, co-founder of Pixar;
- Kathy Lueders, the first woman to head NASA's human spaceflight program as the Associate Administrator of the Human Exploration and Operations (HEO) Mission Directorate.
- Jaron Lanier, computer scientist and writer; known as a founder of virtual reality

=== Faculty ===
Notable faculty include:

- Antonya Nelson, named by The New Yorker as one of the 20 best young fiction writers in America, has published three novels and more than 50 stories
- Stanley Tennenbaum, mathematical logician
- Clyde Tombaugh, astronomer best known for his discovery of Pluto
