= Corralitos Observatory =

Astronomical observatory in New Mexico, US

- Organization: Corralitos Astronomical Research Association
- Location: Las Cruces, New Mexico, US
- Coordinates: 32.3808°N 107.0438°W
- Altitude: 1,453 meters (4,767 ft)
- Established: 1965
- Closed: after 2001
- Website: Corralitos Observatory

Corralitos Observatory was an astronomical observatory located in the Rough and Ready Hills approximately 30 kilometers (19 mi) west of Las Cruces, New Mexico. It was formally dedicated on October 12, 1965, serving as a remote station of Dearborn Observatory, Northwestern University. In October 1965, a NASA program to detect transient lunar phenomenon (TLP) was begun by the staff. Using two-person observer teams, a total of 6,466 man-hours of lunar observation was recorded. The program was run until 1972 but did not confirm any TLP. Using ninety-eight selected reports of TLPs received from amateurs during this period, 39 were checked from Corralitos Observatory.

On October 22, 1966, a specialized Schmidt wide-angle camera was set up at the observatory. Sponsored by Chrysler, the telescope employed a 0.152 m (6.0 in) aperture correction mirror and a 0.3 m (12 in) spherical mirror with combined a 0.6 m (24 in) focal length. It was built as a test model for a far ultraviolet camera intended for the Apollo spacecraft. This may have been the first operational camera of its type. Also in 1966, a 0.3 m (12 in) optical diameter image orthicon system previously located at Organ Pass Station in the Organ Mountains east of Las Cruces was moved to Corralitos. It was replaced with a 0.4 m (16 in) system in 1969. The observatory was mainly staffed by students of New Mexico State University.

During the 1970s, the first operational semi-automated supernovae search program was conducted at the observatory, using 0.6 m (24 in) and 0.3 m (12 in) Cassegrain telescopes. After the telescope was automatically computer pointed to a galaxy, it would allow visual comparison of a high-resolution monitor to a master picture, though photographed also. For difficult galaxies the high-resolution screen photograph negatives were checked within an hour and compared to a prior master set. Ten supernovae were found at Corralitos. On April 14, 1970, U.T. James and Mickey Gallivan, using the 0.6 m telescope, were believed to have been the only ones to have photographed the explosion of Apollo 13 as it was approaching the Moon. In 1971, a photograph of Apollo 14 separating from the S-IVB rocket was taken by Justus Dunlap from the observatory.

In 1973, the site included 0.6 m (24 in) and 0.4 m (16 in) Cassegrain telescopes equipped with storage tubes, remote readouts and image orthicon electronic imaging tubes. The 0.6 m telescope had automated operation capability controlled by a computer. A 0.3 m (12 in) Cassegrain was available for photometry, and the 0.152 m (6.0 in) Chrysler Schmidt telescope was still available. By 1977, only the 0.6 m and 0.4 m telescopes were reported as operational.

In 1978 operations at the site were halted due to funding issues, and in 1981 the observatory was transferred to the Corralitos Astronomical Research Association (CARA).

As recently as 1997, the observatory was reported to be engaged in long-term photometric monitoring of faint Be stars. The CARA website had not been updated since 2001 prior to it being shut down in 2012, and there are no references to new observatory activities in the academic literature.

== See also ==
- Apache Point Observatory
- List of astronomical observatories
