= Lower Walnut Focus =

A part of the Great Bend Aspect, the Lower Walnut Focus is one of three major areas for archaeological sites. The Great Bend Aspect is a grouping of the foci Little River, Marion, and Lower Walnut that share general traits. A focus is considered the compilation of more than one site that shares distinctive traits on artifacts such as pottery. The artifacts found at these sites tell the story of the Wichita tribe that is in the area of the junction of the Walnut and Arkansas Rivers.

== Location ==
The Lower Walnut Focus is located in the lower part of Kansas and the northern part of Oklahoma. It lies on the Eastern portion of the state border. The main focal point of the focus is the junction of the two rivers. This is located in Cowley County which is one of the main counties in the focus, with Arkansas City being a major focal point for archaeological work.

== Wichita ==
The people of the Wichita tribe populated the Great Bend aspect which included the Lower Walnut during the period AD 1425-1650. Wichita had a settlement of 1200 strong at the Great Settlement which is now known as the archaeological site of Etzanoa. The Wichita subdivisions that populated the Lower Walnut Focus were the Etzanoa, Jumano, Ouisitas, and Pani Noir. There has been some archaeological evidence such as ceramics, obsidian, and turquoise that suggests that the Wichita people had connections with the Spanish, Puebloan, and Pawnee.

== Archaeological sites ==
There is a plethora of archaeological sites around the Lower Walnut. There are about 20 sites along an 8 km area on both sides of the Lower Walnut River. Some of the major sites are Larcom-Haggard, Country Club, and Etzanoa. Larcom-Haggard lies near the Arkansas City Bypass, which is where bell-shaped pits, obsidian, pottery sherds, and turquoise are found. These types of artifacts were also found at Country Club which is located along the river bluffs near Arkansas City. There were 10 to 15 mounds along the site which is evidence that the area was settled by a significant population. Etzanoa is one of the largest sites that has 22 sites combined which was also termed the “Great Settlement.” It is located at the conjunction of the Walnut and Arkansas Rivers.

== Artifacts ==
Among these sites, many artifacts were found by archaeologists. The most common of these artifacts found are ceramics and obsidian, with a few findings of turquoise as well. These materials were used for trade either into or out of the Lower Walnut Focus.

=== Obsidian ===
Larcom-Haggard, as well as the other Arkansas City sites, was the home of many obsidian flakes found by archaeologists over time. Waldo Wedel found three flakes of obsidian at Larcom-Haggard in the late 1940s. In the 1994-1996 data recovery, there were 17 flakes of obsidian found at Larcom-Haggard and 20 found at Country Club. Unnotched flakes are the most common in the Lower Walnut Focus but there are a few notched flakes.

=== Ceramics / Pottery ===
In the Lower Walnut Focus, the common form of ceramics is shell-tempered pottery and sherds. There was also a reasonable quantity of sand-tempered pottery. The ceramics tended to be flat bottom jars and bowls with loop handles. The techniques used in the manufacture of these ceramics included the pinch pot method, molding, and coiling. The shell-tempered vessels tended to have flat bases and surfaces. Based on the archaeological evidence the ceramics were made in-house and used as vessels for cooking. These vessels were minimally decorative with just simple techniques of trailed lines, ridges, incised lines, etc. There were non-local ceramics that were associated with the Little River focus which is also a part of the Great Bend Aspect. Pottery from this focus has been discovered in other regions of Kansas.

=== Turquoise ===
Along with obsidian, and pottery, turquoise had an increased rate of trade. During the 1994-1996 data recovery done by the Kansas State Historical Society, over 300 turquoise artifacts were recovered. The modified turquoise was in the shape of beads and pendant fragments. These were acquired by trade from areas in the Southwest, with one source being New Mexico. Compared to the other artifacts found, turquoise is the least popular in the Lower Walnut Focus.
