= History of slavery in New Mexico =

Slavery in New Mexico existed among the Native American (Indian) tribes prior to the arrival of the first Europeans. In 1542, the Spanish king banned the enslavement of the Indians of the Americas in Spanish colonies, but the ban was mostly ineffective. The enslavement of Indians was common during the Spanish exploration and colonization of New Mexico from 1540 to 1821. Slaves of the Spanish included a few of the Pueblos living in the Spanish colony, but most slaves were captured from other Indian tribes in the region. Women were more valued than men as slaves. Slaves were not only valued for their labour, but were also a prestige item among the more prominent and prosperous of the Spanish colonists. Enslavement of an individual was not always permanent. Slaves, especially women, often gained kinship relationships with their owners. The offspring and descendants of enslaved persons were called genizaros and made up one-third of New Mexico's population in the early 19th century. In the Spanish caste system genizaros had low status, but were important for frontier defense and cultural contacts with Indian tribes. Forced labor and debt peonage were also features of slavery in New Mexico. Some Indians captured and enslaved in New Mexico were sent south to work in Mexican mines or even to distant places like Cuba to work on sugar plantations.

Spanish, mixed-blood people, and other Indians were frequently captured and enslaved by the Comanche and other Plains Indians. Many of the slaves were integrated into Indian tribes; some were ransomed or purchased by Spaniards and Franciscan missionaries.

After Mexico gained independence from Spain in 1821, all slavery was declared illegal but institutions of involuntary servitude continued. New Mexico became United States territory in 1846 and slavery became legal until the American Civil War from 1861 to 1865. Very few African-Americans lived in New Mexico; most slaves were Native Americans.

== Native American slaves ==
The first Europeans to visit New Mexico were Francisco Vasquez de Coronado and his army. In 1541, Coronado used two slaves he found at Pecos Pueblo as guides for his expedition to Quivira in present-day Kansas. The slaves were probably Wichita and Pawnee Indians who had been captured or purchased by the people of the Pecos Pueblo. A Teyas Indian female slave accompanying Coronado escaped from the Spaniards, but had the bad luck to be recaptured in present-day Texas by Luis de Moscoso who was leading the Hernando de Soto Expedition. Moscoso took her to Mexico where she presumably remained the rest of her life. These stories are evidence that slavery and trade in slaves by the Native American people of New Mexico existed prior to the arrival of the Spaniards.

== Spanish rule ==
In 1542, King Carlos I of Spain enacted the "New Laws of the Indies for the Good Treatment and Preservation of the Indians" outlawing slavery in Spain's American colonies. However, the New Law was often violated on the remote frontiers of New Spain. Spanish settlement of New Mexico, led by Juan de Oñate, began in 1598. Only a few Pueblo Indians living in or near the Spanish settlements were enslaved. Many Pueblos quickly became nominal Christians and they were protected from slavery, albeit with their labor exploited and their freedom restricted, by Roman Catholic Franciscan missionaries who were independent of the colony's governor. Pueblos were sometimes enslaved by court order. The 1659 court case of Juan Suñi, a young Hopi man accused of stealing food and trinkets in the governor's mansion, resulted in a sentence of ten years of enslavement.

Indian slaves in the 17th century became colonial New Mexico's most valuable product, but the Indian population of the Americas declined precipitously, mostly from Old World diseases but partly because of slavery and war, after contact with Europeans. The Pueblos in New Mexico may have numbered 60,000 in the mid 16th century, but by 1680 their population was only 15,000. The Spanish colonies needed labor in silver mines hundreds of miles south of New Mexico and also employed slaves as servants, concubines, herders, farmers, and prestige items for households in New Mexico. In the 17th century, Apaches visited trade fairs in Spanish settlements with Wichita (Quiviran) captives for sale which settlers and Franciscans purchased as slaves. The Spanish also acquired Indian slaves by capturing Apaches and Utes who lived in areas surrounding the New Mexican settlements. Many were sold to mine owners southwards from New Mexico to help satisfy a large demand for mine workers; a slave purchased in New Mexico could be sold for more than double that price to mine owners in Chihuahua. Many slaves were also owned by Spanish settlers in New Mexico. In the late 18th century, some female Indian slaves were sent by the Spanish to Cuba. Slaves of African origin in colonial New Mexico probably numbered less than a dozen and by 1800 they had been absorbed into the general population.

Enslaving Indians and selling them or exploiting their labor was one of the few ways Spanish governors in New Mexico could profit from their appointment to this remote province of New Spain. As scholar Frank McNitt wrote, "Governors were a greedy and rapacious lot whose single-minded interest was to wring as much personal wealth from the province as their terms allowed. They exploited Indian labor for transport, sold Indian slaves in New Spain, and sold Indian products...and other goods manufactured by Indian slave labor."

The Spanish justified their slave raids as a "just war" against hostile Indians. The slave raids resulted in retaliatory raids by Indians, bringing death or captivity to many Spanish and Pueblos and impoverishing the colony. Although slaves were protected by the Laws of the Indies, many of them complained of mistreatment. Slaves were baptized as Christians and given Christian names, but often left the church if they escaped from the Spanish. Spanish officials and missionaries generally supported slavery, believing the "redeemed" captives were better off after being converted to Christianity.

=== Pueblo Revolt ===
In 1680, the Pueblo Revolt of the Pueblos of New Mexico against Spanish rule, killed or captured 422 Spaniards and expelled the remaining 1,946, including 426 Indian "servants" (most of whom were probably slaves) from New Mexico. The reasons for the revolt included the disruption of Pueblo trade with Apaches caused by Spanish slaving raids. The rebels also demanded that slaves living among the Spanish be released. Among the promises made by the rebels to encourage men to join the revolt was that for each Spaniard they killed they would receive one woman as a wife. Women and children in New Mexico were commodities to be traded among warring factions. Author James F. Brooks points out that a difference between African-American slavery in the southern United States and slavery in New Mexico is that slaves in New Mexico were integrated over time into the ethnic group in which they were captive. Through violence, the slave trade in women and children "knit diverse peoples into webs of painful kinship."

The Spanish reclaimed New Mexico beginning in 1692. In reconquering the capital of Santa Fe the Spanish enslaved 400 Pueblo women and children who were among the defeated rebels. However, the returning Spaniards recognized the limits of what their Pueblo subjects would endure. Early in the 18th century relations between Pueblos and Spaniards improved in response to raids on New Mexico by Apaches, Navajos, and Utes. Moreover, uniting the Spaniards and Pueblos, a new and dangerous threat to the colony appeared, the nomadic Comanche.

=== Comanches ===
In the words of historian Pekka Hämäläinen, the Comanches "were racially color-blind people who saw in almost every stranger a potential kinsperson, but they nevertheless built the largest slave economy in the colonial Southwest." In the 18th century, the Comanches pushed the Apaches off the Great Plains and built a proto-empire that stretched 600 km (370 miles) from north to south from the Arkansas River in Colorado to near the Rio Grande River in Texas. By the mid-18th century, the Comanche dominated the weaker tribes living on the plains east of New Mexico. They numbered 10,000 to 15,000 in 1750 and their population was growing rapidly as it was augmented by a large number of slaves and former slaves integrated into the tribe. By contrast the population of New Mexico (including the area of El Paso, Texas) was only slowly increasing, totaling 17,000 in 1750 and consisting of 5,000 "Spanish" (which included mestizos and Indian servants and slaves) and 12,000 Pueblo Indians. Comanche numbers began declining in 1780 due to recurrent epidemics of European diseases. The Comanches possessed huge horse herds and dealt also in bison robes and deer skins. They needed additional labor to achieve their economic interests, and they obtained it by slave raids and trade in slaves.

Comanche raids on New Mexico began in the 1710s and continued until 1786 when Comanches and New Mexicans negotiated a durable peace. Comanche raiding in Texas and south of the Rio Grande would begin again in the 1790s, but New Mexico and the Comanches remained on friendly terms, New Mexico being a reliable source of supply, a purveyor of gifts to the Comanches to keep the peace, and an ally in fighting their common enemy, the Apaches. Estimates of the number of Indian captives among the Comanches in the early 1800s range from 900 to 2,500. In addition to the captive slaves who remained with the Comanches, they ransomed many. A common vehicle to trade Comanche slaves for New Mexican goods was the trade fair held in Taos every July and August. The Comanches arrived at the fair with their captive slaves and sold them to the Spanish in exchange for maize, ammunition, tobacco, cloth, and other manufactured goods. Women slaves sold for more than double the price of male slaves.

=== Genizaros ===
Brooks estimates that 5,000 Indian captives of many different tribes were ransomed or purchased by the Spanish in New Mexico between 1700 and 1880, the Comanches being the largest purveyors of slaves. Newly acquired Indian slaves were baptized and given Spanish names, usually those of their masters. The offspring of an enslaved woman was called a "coyote". The father was often the slave's owner. Slaves served their purchaser for ten to twenty years. The ransomed slaves, their offspring, and their descendants in New Mexico were called genízaros. They worked primarily as domestic servants, sheep herders, and other laborers. Although no longer slaves, genizaros were the lowest class of Spanish society. By the end of the 18th century, genizaros were estimated to comprise about one third of the entire population of New Mexico which totaled 29,041 in 1793.

The settlements of Tomé and Belén just south of Albuquerque, were described by Juan Agustin Morfi in 1778:

In all the Spanish towns of New Mexico there exists a class of Indians called genizaros. These are made up of captive Comanches, Apaches, etc. who were taken as youngsters and raised among us, and who have married in the province ... They are forced to live among the Spaniards, without lands or other means to subsist except the bow and arrow which serves them when they go into the back country to hunt deer for food ... They are fine soldiers, very warlike ... Expecting the genizaros to work for daily wages is a folly because of the abuses they have experienced, especially from the Spanish authorities in the past ... In two places, Belen and Tome, some sixty families of genizaros have congregated.

Pueblo people, usually exempt from being slaves, were sometimes enslaved by court order. The 1659 court case of Juan Suñi, a young Hopi man accused of stealing food and trinkets in the governor's mansion, resulted in a sentence of ten years of enslavement.

Because they had few rights under the casta laws of the Spanish, acceptance of land grants and resettlement on the dangerous frontiers of New Mexico was the principal way for genízaros to become landowners. In 1754, to deal with the Indian raids and the faltering colony, New Mexico governor Tomás Vélez Cachupín gave 34 genízaro families a land grant in Abiquiú in exchange for them taking a prominent role in defense of the northern frontier of New Mexico. The 1786 peace treaty with the Comanches permitted the Spanish to expand eastward out of the narrow confines of the Rio Grande Valley onto the Great Plains. In 1794, San Miguel del Vado near the Pecos River was the first genizaro settlement on the plains and it was followed by several more along the Pecos River.

== Mexican rule ==
After Mexico gained independence from Spain in 1821, Mexico enacted the Treaty of Córdoba, which decreed that indigenous tribes within its borders were citizens of Mexico. Officially, the newly independent Mexican government proclaimed a policy of social equality for all ethnic groups, and the genízaros were officially considered equals to their vecino (villagers of mainly mixed racial background) and Pueblo neighbors. This never was completely put into practice. The Mexican slave trade continued to flourish. The average price for a boy slave was $100, while girls brought $150 to $200. Girls demanded a higher price because they were thought to be excellent house keepers and they were frequently used as sex slaves.

In the period of Mexican and early American rule (1821–1880), most of the genízaros and captive servants in New Mexico were of Navajo ancestry. Author Brugge estimates that 2,465 Navajos were captive servants during the 1860s as well as 1,000 from other tribes. During negotiations with the United States military, Navajo spokesmen raised the issue of Navajos being held as servants in Spanish/Mexican households. When asked how many Navajos were among the Mexicans, they responded (with exaggeration): "over half the tribe". Most of the captives never returned to the Navajo nation but remained as the lower classes in the Hispanic villages. Members of different tribes intermarried in these communities.

== United States rule ==
After New Mexico territory passed to American rule following the Treaty of Guadalupe Hidalgo which ended the Mexican–American War in 1848, the issue of slavery in the new territory became a major issue, with the Whigs wanting to keep Mexico's ban on slavery and the Democrats wanting to remove it. In the Compromise of 1850, it was decided that New Mexico Territory would be able to choose its own stance on slavery by popular sovereignty. In 1859, New Mexico passed the Act for the Protection of Slave Property. This was partially because Territorial Governor William Carr Lane and Chief Justice of the New Mexico Supreme Court Grafton Baker owned black slaves. Many local citizens had seen the issue in different terms; soon after the Treaty had been signed, a group of prominent New Mexicans went on record in opposition to slavery, in their petition to congress to change the military government to a temporary territorial form. They were likely motivated by their desire for self-government, and the fact that the slave state of Texas claimed much of New Mexico east of the Rio Grande, and that many believed that it was planning to invade again as it had in 1841 and 1843. However, black slaves never numbered more than a dozen during these years.

On June 19, 1862, Congress prohibited slavery in all US territories. New Mexico citizens petitioned the US Senate for compensation for 600 Indian slaves that were going to be set free. The Senate denied their request and sent federal agents to enforce the abolition of slavery. The Spanish practice of peonage, a type of involuntary servitude, became a legal workaround to the abolition of slavery. The Thirteenth Amendment to the United States Constitution legally abolished both slavery and involuntary servitude in December, 1865 (except as a punishment for convicts, which remains legal under the Constitution to this day). When Special Indian Agent J.K. Graves visited in June 1866, he found that slavery was still widespread, often in the form of peonage. Many of the federal agents had captive servants; in his report, Graves estimated that there were 400 slaves in Santa Fe alone. On March 2, 1867, Congress passed the Peonage Act of 1867, which specifically targeted enforcement against the practice in New Mexico.

=== Last slaves ===
Slavery in New Mexico and the southwestern United States persisted into the 20th century in isolated cases. In 1909, trader Louisa Wade Wetherill inherited 32 Ute slaves, all women, from a rich Navajo leader. She gave the women a herd of sheep and sent them on their way, but they gave away their sheep and came back destitute to her trading post. She built them hogans and permitted them to live nearby, feeding them and giving them work when they asked for it.

== Human trafficking ==
Today, some have argued that New Mexico has had slavery in the form of human trafficking. In cooperation with New Mexico attorney general, Life Link has created the 505 Get Free initiative, which promotes a hotline to report trafficking. Santa Fe, New Mexico, has also supported the initiative, both with funding and requirements for advertising the hotline. The Border Violence Unit has special training to combat human trafficking in the state. In 2015, New Mexico received a $1.5 million grant to combat human trafficking. On July 29, 2016, the city of Albuquerque held the New Mexico World Day Against Trafficking in Persons, which included speakers, entertainers and participation of SOLD: The Human Trafficking Experience.

== In popular culture ==
- "Along Came Mariana" an episode of Death Valley Days, set in 1857, concerns a young woman sold into peonage by her father in settlement of a debt.
