= El Turco (guide) =

16th-century Native American guide to Coronado

El Turco (died August 5 1541) was a Native American (either Wichita or Pawnee) guide and slave of Francisco Vázquez de Coronado along with Big Eyes and Ysopete. He was so called El Turco by the Spaniards because of his similar appearance to Turks. He was held captive at Cicúique near contemporary Pecos. In spring 1541, he led the Spaniards to the city of Quivira which was said to hold gold, silver and rich textiles. When El Turco told Captain Hernando de Alvarado That his Valuable gold bracelet had been taken by Natives at Cicuye (Pecos Pueblo) Alvarado returned to the Pueblo seeking its return, when Alvarado asked Cacique and Bigotes About the Bracelet both leaders denied any knowledge of the bracelet and refusing to accompany Captain Alvarado back to Colorado, angered by this he accuses the two of lying and disobeying him has El Turco Cacique and Bigotes placed in collars and chains After the Spaniards reached Quivira, they were disappointed to find out the stories weren’t true and that El Turco had lied and conspired with the Quivirans to kill the Spaniards and their horses. In anger, Francisco Vazquez de Coronado ordered his men to have El Turco tortured into confession then have him garroted before leaving Quivira on August 5, 1541. Today El Turco is regarded as an Indigenous hero in a display at Albuquerque's Indian Pueblo Cultural Center because his disinformation led Vázquez de Coronado onto the Great Plains and thus relieved the beleaguered pueblos of Spanish depredations for at least a few months.
