= Big Eyes (Wichita woman) =

Native American guide for the Coronado expedition

Big Eyes (c. 1520 – 1542 or later) was a Wichita woman from what is now the Texas panhandle enslaved by Tejas, Tiguex, and later Spaniards from around 1535 until her escape in 1541. During her time with the Spanish, she served as a guide for Francisco Vázquez de Coronado's expedition exploring what is now the southwestern United States.

Sometimes described simply as the tattooed woman, Big Eyes had two lines tattooed under her eyes, accentuating her cheekbones, as was customary among Wichita women. Sometime around 1535, Tejas people captured Big Eyes, and they later sold her as a slave to Tiguex people in what is now Arizona. She remained enslaved to the Tiguex until 1540, when Coronado's expedition defeated them in the Tiguex War near the Red River and captured her, after which she became a slave of Juan de Zaldívar, one of Coronado's officers. Being familiar with the area, Big Eyes acted as a guide for the expedition along with a man known as El Turco, who claimed to know the location of the mythical Seven Cities of Gold. By the time Coronado reached Quivira in the spring of 1541 it was clear that the cities would not be found; Coronado executed El Turco, and Big Eyes escaped from the Spaniards and returned to her Wichita village.

In 1542, another Spanish explorer, Hernando de Soto, reached the Mississippi Valley after traveling from Florida on the Atlantic coast. Hearing stories of a woman who had traveled with Coronado, de Soto's companion Luis de Moscoso Alvarado sought out Big Eyes to learn news of the expedition from the Pacific coast. She gave a chronology of the expedition and sketched a crude map in the dust, which Moscoso's soldiers copied onto parchment and which would eventually reach Europe.

Little is known of Big Eyes after her 1542 encounter with de Soto's expedition.
