= Umana =

Umana may refer to:

- Numana (in Curiate Latin), an Italian city, former bishopric and present Latin Catholic titular see
- Mario Umana (1914-2005), American judge and politician
- Rafael Alfonso Umaña Mendez, the Colombian artist known to most as Umaña, who created art for seven decades in New York, France, Spain, Florida, and Virginia
- Antonio Gutierrez de Umana and Francisco Leyba de Bonilla, Spanish explorers of the Great Plains in the 16th century
- Unama people, more commonly known as Omagua, Indigenous peoples of South America.
- Umana Yana, a thatched hut conference building in Georgetown, Guyana
