= Salvador Bucca =

Salvador Bucca (1920-2005) was professor of linguistics at the University of Buenos Aires. He was a Guggenheim fellow in 1958. He was a specialist in the Kitsai language and the indigenous languages of Argentina. His papers and recordings relating to his work are stored in the Archive of the Indigenous Languages of Latin America at the University of Texas at Austin. He donated materials on Chorote, Irish and Thai to the Laboratory of Documentation and Investigation of Linguistics and Anthropology in Buenos Aires.

== Selected publications ==
- Bucca, Salvador and Lesser, Alexander. 1969. "Kitsai Phonology and Morphophonemics". International Journal of American Linguistics 35. 7-20.

== See also ==
- Alexander Lesser
