= Big Eyes (disambiguation) =

Big Eyes is a 2014 film by Tim Burton.

Big Eyes may also refer to:

- "Big Eyes" (song), a Lana Del Rey song from the film's soundtrack
- Big Eyes (1974 film), a 1974 Israeli film
- Big Eyes (Wichita woman), a 16th-century person in North America
