= Escanjaque =

Native American tribe of the Southern Plains

The Escanjaques were an American Indian tribe who lived in the Southern Plains.

Juan de Oñate encountered the Escanjaque in 1601 during an expedition to the Great Plains of Texas, Oklahoma, and Kansas. The Escanjaques may have been identical with the Aguacane who lived along the tributaries of the Red River in western Oklahoma. If so, they were probably related to the people later known as the Wichita.

== Juan de Oñate ==
Juan de Oñate, governor and founder of the newly created Spanish province of New Mexico, led a Spanish expedition to the Great Plains in 1601. He followed the route taken by an unauthorized expedition in 1595, by Francisco Leyva de Bonilla and Antonio Gutierrez de Humana. A Mexican Indian named Jusepe Gutierrez, from Culiacan, Mexico, guided Oñate. Jusepe was a survivor of the Leyva and Humana expedition.

Accompanied by Jusepe, more than 70 Spanish soldiers and priests, an unknown number of Indigenous soldiers and servants, and 700 horses and mules, Oñate journeyed across the plains eastward from New Mexico. Departing June 23, 1601, he followed the Canadian River through the Texas panhandle into Oklahoma. Turning away from the Canadian River, he journeyed cross-country in a northerly direction. The land further north was greener, with more water and groves of walnut and oak trees.

== Description of the Escanjaques ==
Near a small river, Oñate found a large encampment of people he called Escanjaques. He estimated the population at more than 5,000 living in 600 houses. The Escanjaques lived in round houses as large as 90 feet (30 m) in diameter and covered with tanned buffalo hides, similar in form to the grass houses of Quivira. "They were not a people who sowed or reaped, but they lived solely on the cattle [bison]. They were ruled by chiefs ... [but] they obeyed their chiefs but little. They had large quantities of hides which, wrapped around their bodies, served them as clothing, but the weather being hot, all the men went about nearly naked, the women being clothed from the waist down. Men and women alike used bows and arrows, with which they were very dexterous."

The Escanjaques led Oñate to a large settlement of their enemies, the Rayados, about 30 miles (50 km) away. The Rayados abandoned their settlement and Oñate restrained with difficulty the Escanjaques from looting it. He sent them back to their own settlement. However, when Oñate returned to the Escanjaque settlement the next day, the Indians had turned unfriendly and he estimated that 1,500 men attacked him. Oñate fought a two-hour battle with them before retiring from the field and beginning his return to New Mexico. Oñate said that several Spaniards were wounded in the battle and claimed that a large number of Indians were killed.

A cause of the battle may have been that Oñate kidnapped several women and children from the Escanjaques. Oñate released — or was forced to release — several of the women but he "took some boys upon the request of the religious, in order to instruct them in the matters of our holy Catholic faith." One of those kidnapped was named Miguel, a captive of the Escanjaques himself from a land he called Tancoa, possibly the Tonkawa of North Texas and Oklahoma. Miguel would later provide information for the first map of the region.

== The identity of the Escanjaques ==
Some authorities have identified the Escanjaques as Apache, but Oñate's account would seem to distinguish them from the Apache who were by this time well known to the Spanish. They have also been identified as the Kaw, although not persuasively as the Kaw were not known to be on the Great Plains in 1601.

It is possible that "Escanjaques" was not the name of the Indians, but rather a greeting. On meeting Oñate, they extended their hands toward the sun and returned it to their breasts saying "escanjaque." "

Later, Miguel told the Spaniards that the Escanjaques were, in reality, a people called the Aguacane. His information enabled the Spanish to draw a map of the region in which the Aguacane seemed to be located in southwestern Oklahoma along the Red River and its tributaries. If so, it is likely the Escanjaques (Aguacane) were speakers of a Caddoan language and probably akin to the Wichita. Given their geographic location, the Aguacane might also be identical or related to the people called Teyas by Francisco Vásquez de Coronado 60 years before Oñate.

A few more references in the 16th century to the Escanjaques have survived. It has been suggested that their descendants were the Iscani, a Wichita tribe of the 18th century.

== Location of the Escanjaque settlement ==
The Escanjaque settlement Oñate found was probably a temporary camp. Its size, 600 tents and 5,000 people, precludes if from being a hunting camp. Perhaps the camp was large because the Escanjaques intended to go to war with the Rayados, or possibly it was formed to trade with the Rayados for Florence chert, a flint favored for arrowheads over much of Oklahoma and Kansas.

The site of the Escanjaque settlement has not been found and the geographical details in Oñate's account of his journey do not permit a location to be determined with certainty. Two possible locations are suggested: the Ninnescah River about 20 miles south of the present site of Wichita, Kansas or the Salt Fork River near Tonkawa, Oklahoma. Archaeological data best supports the Tonkawa site. An extensive archaeological site at Arkansas City, Kansas, is believed by many to be the site of the Rayado village. Extrapolating backwards a location near Tonkawa for the Escanjaque settlement fits with Oñate's account.

=== See also ===
- Quivira
