= Jusepe =

Jusepe is a masculine Spanish given name, equivalent to Joseph. Notable people with the name include:

- Jusepe de Ribera (1591–1652), Spanish painter
- Jusepe Leonardo (1616–1656), Spanish painter
- Jusepe Gutierrez (c. 1572–?), Native American guide and explorer
