= Kitsai language =

Extinct Caddoan language of North America

Kitsai
- Native to: United States
- Region: previously west-central Oklahoma and eastern Texas
- Ethnicity: Kichai
- Extinct: 1940, with the death of Kai Kai
- Language family: Caddoan: Northern; Pawnee–Kitsai; Kitsai

Language codes
- ISO 639-3: kii
- Glottolog: kits1249
- Linguasphere: 64-BAB-a

Kitsai (also Kichai) is an extinct member of the Caddoan language family. The French first record the Kichai people's presence along the upper Red River in 1701. By the 1840s Kitsai was spoken in southern Oklahoma, but by 1940 no native speakers remained. It is thought to be most closely related to Pawnee. The Kichai people today are enrolled in the Wichita and Affiliated Tribes (Wichita, Keechi), Waco and Tawakonie), headquartered in Anadarko, Oklahoma.

== Phonology ==
=== Consonants ===
Kitsai's consonant inventory consists of the phonemes shown in the chart below. /w/ is analyzed as a velar (i.e. labio-velar) rather than a labial so as to not be the only labial consonant.

	Alveolar	Palatal	Velar	Glottal
Stop	t		k	ʔ
Affricate	t͡s			
Fricative	s			h
Nasal	n			
Sonorant	r	j	w	

=== Vowels ===
Kitsai has the following vowel phonemes:

	Short		Long	
	Front	Back	Front	Back
High	i	u	iː	uː
Mid	e	(o)	eː	(oː)
Low	a		aː	

When adjacent to /k/, the vowels /o/ and /oː/ appear to mostly exist in free variation with /u/ and /uː/ respectively. There are a few instances where /o(ː)/ does not occur next to /k/, like the word for "owl" (pronounced /oːs/), but this is rare. Ultimately, the phonemic status of /o(ː)/ is unclear.

== Documentation ==
Kitsai is documented in the still mostly-unpublished field notes of anthropologist Alexander Lesser, of Hofstra University. Lesser discovered five speakers of Kitsai in 1928 and 1929, none of whom spoke English. Communicating to the Kitsai speakers through Wichita/English bilingual translators, he filled 41 notebooks with Kitsai material.

Kai Kai was the last fluent speaker of Kitsai. She was born around 1849 and lived eight miles north of Anadarko. Kai Kai worked with Lesser to record vocabulary and oral history and prepare a grammar of the language.

In the 1960s, Lesser shared his materials with Salvador Bucca of the Universidad Nacional de Buenos Aires, and they published scholarly articles on Kitsai.

== Vocabulary ==
Some Kitsai words include the following:

- wari:ni 'bear'
- kotay 'corn'
- 'taxko 'coyote'
- a'tsi'u 'grass'
- wí:ta 'man'
- 'ihts 'sweet potato'
- kaxtsnu 'white'
- ho'tonu 'wind'
- tsakwákt 'woman'
