= Battle of Stone Houses =

1837 battle in Texas

The Skirmish of Stone Houses
Date	November 10, 1837
Location	near present-day Windthorst, Texas 33°25′53.94″N 98°27′26.67″W
Result	Kichai victory

Belligerents
Texas Rangers	Kichai

Commanders and leaders
William M. Eastland; A. B. Van Benthusen	Unknown

Strength
18	150 to 180

Casualties and losses
10 killed	ranger's estimate: about 50 killed (probably exaggerated)
- Location within Texas Stone Houses Battlefield (the United States)

The Battle of Stone Houses was a skirmish between Texas Rangers and a band of Kichai Indians which took place on November 10, 1837. The skirmish, which took place ten miles south of what is now Windthorst, Texas, was named for three stone mounds near the battlefield which appeared to the Indians to be small houses.

== Background ==
A group of Kichai raided Fort Smith, Texas on the Little River sometime early in October 1837. On October 13, a company of Texas Rangers led by Captain William Eastland pursued them up the Colorado River; however, the Rangers soon lost the trail. Eastland then began quarreling with Lieutenant A. B. Van Benthusen, and as a result the company separated. Van Benthusen took 17 men north with him and located the Indians' trail on November 1. They then continued north to the Brazos River.

On November 3, near what was to become Fort Belknap, the Rangers found a band of Cherokee and Delawares being led by a Kichai guide, who was immediately killed. The others were spared when they claimed to be friends to all Texans and enemies of the Comanches.

== Skirmish ==
On November 10, the Rangers encountered the Kichais, who had stopped fleeing and were primed instead for an attack. It is said that some of the Cherokee and Delawares who were present attempted to mediate peace, but one of the Rangers, Felix McClusky, attacked and killed an Indian. McClusky was immediately reprimanded and replied that he would kill any Indian for a plug of tobacco; he then proceeded to show one which he had taken from the dead man. This infuriated the Indians, who attacked them.

The Rangers abandoned their horses and ran to a shallow ravine, where they sought protection. The Kichais lost their leader in their first attack but retired to elect a new one and soon took up the battle again. Close-quarter combat continued for two hours, after which the Kichais decided to set the prairie on fire and thus smoke out the Rangers. The Rangers charged through the smoke and the Indians, escaping into woods nearby. Four died in battle before the fire; six more were killed while fleeing. The eight that survived arrived at the settlement on the Sabine River on November 27. Having lost all of their horses and equipment, they had walked the entire way.

The site of the Skirmish of Stone Houses received a historic marker in 1970.
