= Etzanoa =

Historical city of the Wichita people in Kansas, United States

Coordinates: 37°04′03″N 97°00′40″W

- Tzanoa
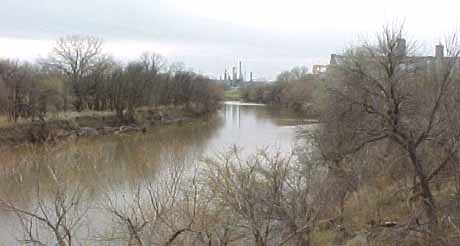
- Walnut River, Arkansas City, Kansas

- Location within Kansas
- Type: Settlement
- Cultures: Wichita people
- Location: Arkansas City, Kansas, United States
- Region: Great Plains

History
- Built: c. 1450
- Abandoned: c. 1700

Site notes
- Length: ~ 5 miles (8.0 km)
- Archaeologists: Donald Blakeslee
- Public access: Accessible to the public.

Etzanoa is a historical city of the Wichita people, located in present-day Arkansas City, Kansas, near the Arkansas River, that flourished between 1450 and 1700. Dubbed "the Great Settlement" by Spanish explorers who visited the site, Etzanoa may have housed 20,000 Wichita people. The historical city is considered part of Quivira.

When Spanish conquistador Francisco Vásquez de Coronado's expedition visited central Kansas in 1541, he dubbed the Wichita settlements "Quivira". The Umana and Leyba expedition visited the Etzanoa site in 1594 and Juan de Oñate visited there in 1601. They recorded the inhabitants as being the Rayados. In Spanish Rayados means "striped". The Wichita people were noted for the straight lines they tattooed onto their faces and their bodies.

In April 2017, the location of Etzanoa was discovered when a cannonball from the 1601 battle was found near Arkansas City by Adam Ziegler. Local researchers used this artifact to pinpoint the location of Etzanoa.

== Archaeological research ==
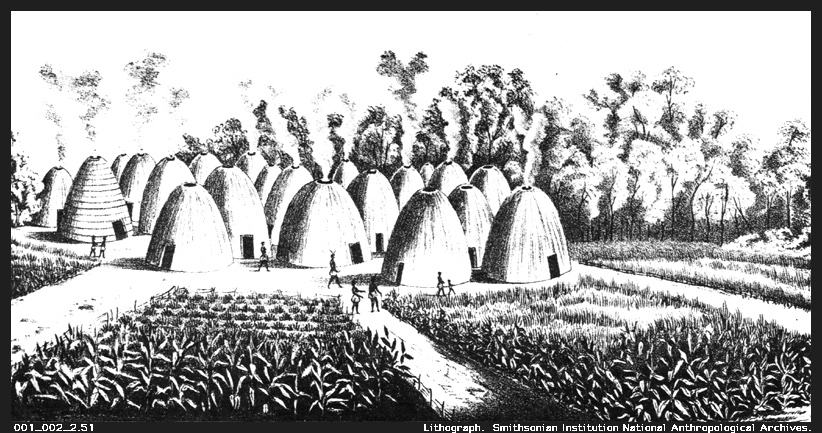
Sketch of 19th-century Wichita Indian village, with beehive-shaped grass houses surrounded by maize, that may be similar to those of Etzanoa

Donald Blakeslee, an archaeologist at Wichita State University, has led recent research on Etzanoa. In 2013, historians at the University of California, Berkeley, retranslated the early Spanish accounts of expeditions to Kansas. These clearer translations allowed Blakeslee to match written descriptions to archaeological sites. He located the 1601 Spanish battle site in Arkansas City.

During road construction in the area in 1994, thousands of artifacts were unearthed. Residents of Arkansas City regularly unearthed artifacts, such as potsherds or flint points.

Archaeologists have discovered more than a dozen large settlements along six miles of the Walnut River extending upstream from near its junction with the Arkansas River. These are called the Lower Walnut focus sites. The occupation of these sites has been dated from 1500 to 1720. Some artifacts of Spanish origin have been found at the site.

The Rayados probably abandoned the Walnut River site in the early 18th century. Perhaps they moved a few miles south to Kay County, Oklahoma, where two 18th-century archaeological sites, Deer Creek and Bryson Paddock, of the Wichita are known. They appear to have been much reduced in numbers by then, possibly as a result of European diseases, warfare, and the slave trade in Indians. The descendants of the Rayados were absorbed into the Wichita tribe.

A 2020 aerial investigation by Blakeslee discovered a probable Etzanoa ceremonial site near the previously identified sites along the Walnut River, with its most prominent feature a circular or semi-circular ditch of two meters width and 50 meters in diameter.

== Rayado Indians ==
Archaeologists and historians believe the Rayado Indians spoke a Caddoan language and were a Wichita sub-tribe. Their grass houses, dispersed mode of settlement, a chief named Catarax – a Wichita title – the description of their granaries, and their location all agree with descriptions of the Wichita. As Wichitas, the Rayados were related to the people that Coronado had discovered in Quivira 60 years earlier. Linguist Nancy Parrott Hickerson dissents and called them "Jumanos." Jumano seems to have been a generic term for Plains Indians with painted or tattooed faces, as were the Rayados.

Both Jusepe's and Oñate's accounts describe the Rayados as numerous. The more than 1,200 houses which Oñate estimated for the settlement indicates a population of at least 12,000, if the houses were as large as those of later Wichita tribes. Moreover, Chief Catarax told the Spanish explorers that there were additional settlements upstream on that river and on other rivers. The fact that the Rayados abandoned their settlement on the arrival of Oñate's expedition may be an indication that they had had previous, unfavorable dealings with the Spanish.

== Spanish chronicles ==
=== Jusepe, 1594/95 ===
In 1594 or 1595, Antonio Gutierrez de Umana and Francisco Leyba de Bonilla led the first known expedition to the Great Plains of Oklahoma and Kansas in more than 50 years. An Indigenous Mexican Jusepe Gutierrez was the lone survivor of the expedition.

Leaving New Mexico and traveling east and north for more than a month, Jusepe said that they found a "very large settlement." He said it extended for more than 10 leagues (about 26 miles) along a river and was two leagues wide. The houses had straw roofs and were built close together, but between clusters of houses were fields of maize, squash, and beans. The Indians were numerous, but "received the Spanish peacefully and furnished them with abundant supplies of food" The expedition encountered a "multitude" of bison in the region. It appears these were the same people later called "Rayados."

=== Oñate, 1601 ===
In 1601, Juan de Oñate, founder and governor of New Mexico, led an expedition that followed in the footsteps of Leyba and Umana. Jusepe guided Oñate, more than 70 Spanish soldiers and priests, an unknown number of Indian soldiers and servants, and 700 horses and mules across the plains.

Oñate met Apache Indians in the Texas Panhandle and, later, a large encampment of Escanjaques. The Escanjaques showed him the way to a large settlement about 30 miles away of a people whom Oñate called "Rayados." Rayado means "striped" in Spanish, referring to their custom of painting or tattooing their faces. The Escanjaques, enemies of the Rayados, attempted to enlist the help of the Spanish to attack the Rayados, who they alleged were responsible for the deaths of Leyba and Umana a few years earlier.

The Escanjaques guided Oñate to a nearby river, probably the Arkansas, where they saw a few hundred Rayados on a hill. The Rayados advanced, throwing dirt into the air as a sign that they were ready for war. Oñate indicated that he did not wish to fight and made peace with the group, who proved to be friendly and generous. Oñate said that, unlike the Escanjaques, the Rayados were "united, peaceful, and settled." They showed deference to their chief, named Catarax, whom Oñate detained as a guide and hostage, although "treating him well."

Catarax led Oñate and the Escanjaques across the Arkansas to a settlement on the eastern bank, a few miles from the river. The settlement was deserted, the inhabitants having fled. It contained "more than twelve hundred houses, all established along the bank of another good-sized river which flowed into the large one [probably the Arkansas]." The settlement of the Rayados was similar to those seen by Coronado in Quivira sixty years before. The homesteads were dispersed; the houses round, thatched with grass and surrounded by large granaries to store the corn, beans, and squash that they grew in their fields. Oñate restrained his Escanjaque guides from looting the town and sent them home. Catarax, who had been chained, was rescued by the Rayados in a bold raid.

The next day Oñate and his army proceeded onward through the settlement for three leagues (eight miles) without seeing many Rayados. The Spaniards were warned, however, that the Rayados were assembling an army to attack them. Discretion seemed the better part of valor. Oñate estimated that three hundred Spanish soldiers would be needed to confront the Rayados, and he turned his soldiers around to return to New Mexico.

Oñate feared a Rayados attack, but apparently it was the Escanjaques who attacked as they turned to New Mexico. Oñate claimed that many Escanjaques were killed in the battle, but many of his soldiers were wounded. After two hours, Oñate broke off the combat, retired from the field, and led his group to New Mexico.

An Escanjaque captured by Oñate, and later named Miguel, drew a map of the region for the Spanish. He called the "Great Settlement" of the Rayados, "Etzanoa" or "Tzanoa."

== Tours ==
Limited private tours of the site can be arranged through the Cherokee Strip Land Run Museum in Arkansas City. A visitors' center is planned.

== See also ==
- List of battles fought in Kansas
- History of Kansas
- Native Americans in the United States
