= Jusepe Gutiérrez =

Nahua guide (fl. 1590s)

- Born: c. 1572; Culhuacan, New Spain
- Occupations: Explorer, guide

Jusepe Gutiérrez (also known as Joseph and usually called only by his given name; born c. 1572, fl. 1590s, death date unknown) was a Native Nahua guide and explorer. He was the only known survivor of the Humana and Leyva expedition to the Great Plains in 1594 or 1595. In 1599 he guided Vicente de Zaldívar and in 1601 Governor Juan de Oñate on expeditions to the plains.

== Background ==
Jusepe was born in Culhuacan, New Spain, about 1572. He spoke Nahuatl and was illiterate. He surely spoke some Spanish, but may not have been fluent as his testimony was later recorded with the help of an interpreter. Jusepe's is the only account of the Umana/Leyba expedition. Jusepe probably took the surname of his employer (or owner), Antonio Gutiérrez de Umana.

In 1593, Jusepe Gutiérrez was recruited by Umana to join him on an expedition (entrada) to what would become New Mexico. Umana collected additional soldiers and servants in Santa Bárbara, Chihuahua, the northernmost settlement of New Spain, and the expedition journeyed north to New Mexico. At the time, there were no Spanish settlers in New Mexico. Gutiérrez and Umana remained about one year among the Pueblo people, mostly in San Ildefonso near the Rio Grande.

== Humana and Leyba expedition ==
The expedition of Humana and his partner, Francisco Leyba de Bonilla (also reported in the literature as Umana and Leyva), was carried out without the permission of Spanish authorities. The members of the expedition included both Spanish soldiers and indigenous Mexicans, although there is no indication of how many people accompanied Humana and Leyba. The sole source of information about this expedition is Gutiérrez, who told the story in an official inquiry with Oñate in 1599.

Humana and Lebya left New Mexico, probably in 1595, to explore eastwards, presumably in search of large cities and rich kingdoms rumored to be just over the horizon. Their route from San Ildefonso led them by the pueblo at Pecos, New Mexico, and out onto the Great Plains of what is today Texas, where they met the Apache. They found numerous rancherías, some of them abandoned, and herds of bison. Gutierrez said they found abundant water in many marshes, springs, and arroyos, as well as great numbers of plum trees and nuts.

Gutierrez said they traveled toward the north and the farther they went, the more abundant were the bison. After some 45 days they came to two large rivers, and beyond was a very large indigenous settlement that extended for 10 leagues (about 26 miles or 42 kilometers) and was two leagues wide. One of the two rivers flowed through the settlement.

Gutierrez gave a brief description of the "Great Settlement", which may have been Etzanoa near the much later Arkansas City, Kansas. The houses were built on a frame of stakes, with straw roofs. They were built close together, separated by narrow pathways, and in some places between the houses were fields of maize, pumpkins, and beans. The people of the settlement received the Spaniards in peace, and provided them with food. They depended upon bison hunting as well as agriculture.

Three days travel north of this settlement, they came upon a "multitude of buffalo", but no more indigenous settlements. Discord between the leaders broke out. After spending an afternoon and morning apparently writing up his account of the dispute, Humana called Leyba to his tent and stabbed him to death with a butcher knife. Humana told his soldiers that Leyba had threatened him. The expedition then continued, reaching a very large river ten days beyond the Great Settlement. The river was one-fourth of a league wide, about two-thirds of a mile or just more than a kilometer, deep and sluggish. "They did not dare to cross it."

It was here that five of the Mexicans, including Gutiérrez, deserted the expedition. Three became lost on the plains, and local indigenous people killed another. Gutierrez was taken captive by Apaches and lived with them for a year, until he escaped or was set free and made his way back to New Mexico. By this time, Oñate and a large group of settlers had arrived in New Mexico, and Gutiérrez took up residence at the San Juan Bautista Pueblo. On February 16, 1599, Oñate interviewed him concerning the Humana and Leyba expedition, and his story was recorded.

According to later accounts, Humana and the other members of the expedition were killed by indigenous people 18 days beyond the Great Settlement.

== Zaldivar expedition ==
On September 15, 1599, Sergeant Major Vicente de Zaldívar Mendoza led a group of about 60 soldiers east to the Great Plains from New Mexico. Gutiérrez served as the guide and interpreter as he had learned the Apache language during his sojourn with them. The objective of the expedition was to procure much-needed meat for the settlers and to see if the bison could be captured and domesticated.

Gutiérrez most likely led Zaldivar on the same route that he had taken with Humana and Leyba. They crossed the Pecos River, caught catfish in the Gallinas River, and six leagues (15 miles or 24 kilometers) hence, came across Apaches and a rancheria. Zaldivar and Gutierrez established friendly relations with the Apaches. Continuing, they saw their first bison probably near present-day Conchas.

Perhaps near Logan, the Spaniards and their Mexican associates built a corral and attempted to drive bison into it from a plain where they apparently saw "100,000" of them. What ensued was a comedy of errors, as the bison proved impossible to capture. However, Zaldivar procured a quantity of dried meat, and after exploring more of eastern New Mexico, near the present day border with Texas, he returned to the Spanish settlements, arriving November 8, 1599.

== Oñate follows Humana and Leyba's route ==
In 1601, Juan de Oñate, the founder of New Mexico and governor of the new colony, led a large expedition to the Great Plains, relying on Gutiérrez as a guide. Gutiérrez led Oñate to the same areas he had visited with Humana and Leyba. Oñate and Gutiérrez followed the Canadian River through the Texas Panhandle. Upon reaching Oklahoma, they encountered sand dunes that made the passage of their oxcarts difficult, so Oñate chose to turn north away from the Canadian to journey onward to the "Great Settlement".

En route, he came across a large encampment of friendly indigenous people he called Escanjaques. They were enemies of the people in the Great Settlement, whom Oñate called "Rayados", because they tattooed or painted their faces. Rayado means "striped" in Spanish.

Unlike the response to Humana and Leyba, the people of the Great Settlement fled on Oñate's arrival and, fearing an attack on his 70 Spanish and an unknown number of Mexican soldiers, Oñate turned back toward New Mexico. The Escanjaques also turned hostile, attacking Oñate, fighting a prolonged battle with him. The cause of the battle is uncertain, but may have been Oñate having kidnapped several boys to be taken back to New Mexico to be instructed in the Christian faith and to serve as interpreters.

The account of Oñate's expedition permits us to speculate about the location of the Great Settlement, possibly called Etzanoa, by its inhabitants. It was probably either at the site of present-day Wichita, Kansas, or along the Walnut River in Arkansas City, Kansas. Archaeological discoveries favor the Walnut River.

== The large river ==
Intriguing in Gutiérrez's account of the Umana and Leyba expedition is the mention of a large river found about ten days north of the Great Settlement. The river that best fits Gutiérrez's description is the Missouri, perhaps near Kansas City. The Missouri is about 500 yards (450 meters) wide at this point, not as wide as Jusepe estimated, but the largest river that could be reached by foot in about 10 days from the Great Settlement. This would mark the first known visit of Europeans to the Missouri River.

What does not fit very well with this possible route is Gutiérrez's comment that three days beyond the Great Settlement they came upon "such a multitude of buffalo that the plain - which was level, for there are no mountains -- was so covered with them that they were startled and amazed at the sight." If the Great Settlement were at Wichita or Arkansas City, three days travel toward the Missouri River would place the expedition in the rocky and rolling Flint Hills, not a plain. Moreover, in historic times, buffalo were most abundant in the shorter grass prairies west of Longitude 97 rather than the tall grass prairies to the east. Thus, the contradictions in Gutierrez's account continue to incite speculation among historians.

Possibly, the "large river" was the Kansas which, during high water, would have been deep and wide. The Platte River in Nebraska has also been suggested, but that would require a major recalculation of the route of Humana, Leyba, and Oñate as well as the location of the Great Settlement.

== Gutiérrez ==
Gutiérrez was one of many, usually anonymous, indigenous Mexican soldiers, servants, and slaves who aided the Spaniards in their explorations. Nothing more is known of him after the return of the Oñate expedition to New Mexico in November 1601.
