= Humana and Leyva expedition =

Spanish attempt to colonize the southern Great Plains

Antonio Gutiérrez de Umaña and Francisco Leyva de Bonilla, Spanish colonists, made an unauthorized expedition to the Great Plains of North America in 1594 or 1595. A native, Jusepe Gutiérrez, was the only survivor and the source of fragmentary information about the expedition. The route Umaña and Leyva followed can not be determined with certitude, but it probably included traveling to what is today the U.S. states of Texas, Oklahoma, and Kansas.

== Background ==
In 1593, Antonio Gutiérrez de Humaña (also spelled Umaña) recruited Jusepe Gutiérrez (usually called just Jusepe) in Culiacán, in the modern-day Mexican state of Sinaloa, to join him on an entrada (expedition) to what would become New Mexico. At the time, the Viceroy of New Spain was planning to authorize an official expedition and colonization of New Mexico. The expedition of Humaña and his partner, Francisco Leyva de Bonilla (also spelled Leyba), was therefore illegal.

After recruiting Jusepe, Humaña and Leyva found additional Spanish and Indian soldiers and servants in Santa Bárbara, Chihuahua, and proceeded onward into what is today New Mexico. They remained there, among the Pueblo Indians near the Rio Grande, about one year. At the time there were no Spanish settlers in New Mexico, although there may have been other fortune-seekers and slavers living among the pueblos.

== The expedition ==
Jusepe told the story of the expedition to Juan de Oñate.

Humaña and Leyva and an unknown number of Spanish and Indian soldiers and servants left New Mexico to explore eastwards, presumably in search of rich kingdoms which were rumored to be just over the horizon. Their route led them by the Indian pueblo at Pecos and out onto the Great Plains of Texas where they met the Vaquero (Apache) Indians. They found numerous rancherías, some of them abandoned, and herds of bison, the American buffalo. Jusepe said they found abundant water in many marshes, springs, and arroyos (brooks) as well as great numbers of plum trees and nuts. At some point they turned toward the north. The further they went the more abundant the bison became. After traveling 45 days, they crossed two big rivers and beyond was a very large Indian settlement ten leagues long (about 26 miles) and two leagues wide. One of the two rivers flowed through the settlement.

Jusepe gave a brief description of the "Great Settlement". The houses were built on a frame of stakes with straw roofs. They were built close together, separated by narrow pathways and, in some places, between the houses were fields of maize, pumpkins, and beans. The people of the settlement received the Spanish in peace and provided them with food. They depended upon buffalo hunting and also agriculture.

Leaving the Great Settlement, three days to the north they came upon a "multitude of buffalo", but no more native settlements. Discord between the leaders broke out. Humaña spent an afternoon and morning in his tent apparently writing up his account of the dispute and then sent a soldier, Miguel Pérez, to summon Leyva. Leyva came to Humaña's tent, dressed in shirt and breeches only. Humaña "drew a butcher knife which he carried in his pocket, unsheathed it, and stabbed Captain Leyba twice". Leyva died and was quickly buried. Then Humaña showed "some papers" to his men. He said that because Leyva had threatened to give him a "beating with a stick" he had killed him.

The expedition continued, reaching a very large river ten days beyond the Great Settlement. The river was one-fourth of a league wide (about two-thirds of a mile, or one kilometer), deep and sluggish: "They did not dare to cross it." It was here that five of the natives, including Jusepe, deserted. Three became lost on the plains and Indians killed another. Jusepe was taken captive by Apaches and lived with them for a year until he escaped or was set free and made his way back to New Mexico. By this time (1596), Oñate and a large group of settlers had arrived in New Mexico and Jusepe took up residence at the San Juan Bautista Pueblo. On February 16, 1599, Oñate interviewed him concerning the Humaña and Leyva expedition.

According to later accounts from Indians, Humaña and the other members of the expedition were killed by Indians 18 days beyond the Great Settlement.

== Etzanoa, the "Great Settlement" ==
In 1601, Jusepe guided Juan de Oñate, the founder of New Mexico and governor of the new colony, on a large expedition to the Plains. He took Oñate to the same area where he had gone with Humaña and Leyva. They found the "Great Settlement" or Etzanoa, which was located along the Walnut River in what is today Arkansas City, Kansas. The people of the Great Settlement were almost certainly Wichita Indians whom Oñate later called Rayados.

The large river where Jusepe deserted the expedition may have been the Missouri, perhaps near modern-day Kansas City. The Missouri is about 500 yards wide at this point, not as wide as Jusepe estimated, but the largest river that could be reached in about 10 days travel from the Great Settlement. This would be the first known visit of Europeans to the Missouri River.

What does not fit very well with this possible route is Jusepe's comment that three days beyond the Great Settlement that they came upon "such a multitude of buffalo that the plain—which was level, for there are no mountains—was so covered with them that they were startled and amazed at the sight". If the Great Settlement were at Wichita or Arkansas City, three days travel toward the Missouri River would place the expedition in the rocky and rolling Flint Hills not a plain. Moreover, in historic times buffalo were most abundant in the shorter grass prairies west of longitude 97° rather than the tall grass prairies to the east. Thus, the contradictions in Jusepe's account will continue to provoke speculation.

Conceivably the "great river" was the Kansas, which during high water would have been deep and wide. The Platte River in Nebraska has also been suggested, but that would require a major recalculation of the route of Humaña, Leyva, and Oñate and the location of the Great Settlement.
