= Querecho =

Historical Native American tribe in Texas

Regions with significant populations
- U.S. Southern Plains (northwestern Texas Panhandle)

Languages
- Plains Apache language

Religion
- Indigenous religion

Related ethnic groups
- other Plains Apache, possibly Teya people

The Querecho Indians were a historical band of Apache people living on the Southern Plains.

In 1541 the Spanish conquistador Francisco Vásquez de Coronado and his army journeyed east from the Rio Grande Valley in search of a rich land called Quivira. Passing through the Texas Panhandle, he met a people he called the Querechos.

This was the first known venture of Europeans across the Great Plains of the United States. Coronado and his chroniclers were the first Europeans to describe the buffalo-hunting nomads of the Plains.

== Name ==
The name Querecho was what the Pecos Pueblo people called this band of Apache. The term Apachu was not written down until 1601. The word Querecho passed out of usage, replaced by other names.

== History ==
=== 1540s ===
The Coronado Expedition were the first Europeans to encounter the Querecho in 1541. Coronado and his army found a Querecho settlement of about 200 houses on the Llano Estacado, of Staked Plains, of the Texas Panhandle and adjacent New Mexico. On the Llano they also saw vast herds of buffalo or bison. According to members of Coronado’s expedition:

[The Querechos lived] in tents made of the tanned skins of the cows (bison). They travel around near the cows killing them for food.... They travel like the Arabs, with their tents and troops of dogs loaded with poles... these people eat raw flesh and drink blood. They do not eat human flesh. They are a kind people and not cruel. They are faithful friends. They are able to make themselves very well understood by means of signs. They dry the flesh in the sun, cutting it thin like a leaf, and when dry they grind it like meal to keep it and make a sort of sea soup of it to eat.... They season it with fat, which they always try to secure when they kill a cow. They empty a large gut and fill it with blood, and carry this around the neck to drink when they are thirsty.

=== 1560s ===
In 1565, Francisco de Ibarra met a bison-hunting people he called Querechos near Casas Grandes, Mexico, hundreds of miles from where Coronado had visited them. There were about 300 men and their "attractive" women and children visiting the area, probably on a trading mission. They said that large bison herds could be found on a four-day journey to the North. This meeting indicates that the Querechos were far-ranging even before they acquired horses.

=== 1580s ===
This brief account describes many typical features of pre-horse Plains Indians culture: using hide for clothing and lodges (tipis), travois pulled by dogs, Plains sign language, jerky (food), and pemmican. In 1581, Spanish explorers of the Chamuscado and Rodriguez Expedition had another meeting with the Querechos. They found a large "rancheria" of 400 warriors on the Pecos River. probably near present-day Santa Rosa, New Mexico. The Spanish were especially interested in the Indian dogs which pulled travois with all their belongings. The Indians told the Spaniards that the bison herds were two days to the east and were "as numerous as grass in the fields."

In 1583, the explorer Antonio de Espejo met Querechos in the mountains near Acoma who traded salt, game, and deerskins to the townspeople in exchange for cotton blankets. He described them as warlike and numerous. These were the people later called Navajos, related to the Apache.

== Who Were the Querecho? ==
The Querecho were a band of Apache. They were Southern Athabascan people who had migrated to the Southwest and Southern Plains in previous centuries from the Athabascan homelands in Alaska and northwestern Canada.

The Apache arrived on the Llano Estacado perhaps possibly around 1450 CE years the Spanish visited them there. A village farming culture in the Texas Panhandle, the Antelope Creek Phase, disappeared about 1450. The reason for its disappearance may have been displacement by the Apache or the onset of a dryer climatic phase. By the time of Coronado, it appears that the Apache settled across a wide area of the Great Plains extending north from the Llano Estacado to Nebraska. They might be related to the Dismal River culture.
