= Great Bend Aspect =

The Great Bend Aspect is the region occupied by the Wichita people from 1475 to 1700 in modern day Kansas. The Great bend aspect consists of habitation sites in what are now known as McPherson, Butler, Rice, Marion, Cowley, and Wilson counties. In addition to this, there were several village clusters throughout the great bend aspect. These village cluster sites are known as Little River, Marion, Augusta, Lower Walnut, and Neodesha. These locations were determined by anthropologists and archaeologists by comparing artifacts found at each site, with the inhabitants having similar ceramic attributes. These settlement sites also had similar economies, mostly practicing hunter-gatherer subsistence.

== Inhabitants ==
The inhabitants of the great bend aspect included the Wichita people, that was made up of several subgroups, including the Tawakoni, Wichita, Waco, and Taovaya. The reason these subgroups are associated with the Wichita group and with the Great Bend Aspect is due to the similar artifacts found throughout all of the areas.

== Artifacts ==
Artifacts found in these various sites had similar materials, and styles. The common materials used were sand, shell, grog, bone, and caliche. The handles of their ceramics were also similar, coming mostly in the strap and loop forms. These artifacts included plates, blades, scrapers, perforators and jars.

== Economy ==
The economy of the Great Bend Aspect was based on subsistence and light agriculture. The inhabitants of villages within the Great Bend Aspect practiced hunting and gathering, fishing and some crops, including sunflowers, maize, squash and beans.
