= Quivira =

Province of the American Wichita people

Quivira was a province of the ancestral Wichita people, located near the Great Bend of the Arkansas River in central Kansas, The exact site may be near present-day Lyons extending northeast to Salina.

The Wichita city of Etzanoa, which flourished between 1450 and 1700, is likely part of Quivira.

Spanish conquistador and explorer Francisco Vázquez de Coronado visited in 1541.

== Description ==
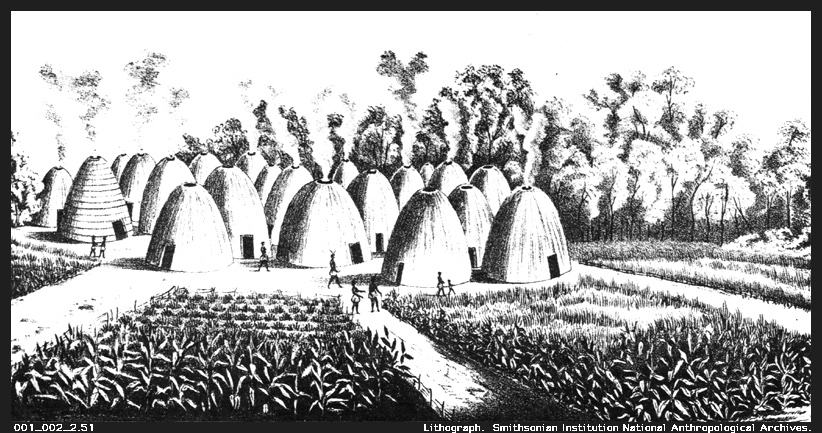
A sketch of a Wichita community in the 19th century. The beehive-shaped grass lodges surrounded by cornfields are characteristic and appear similar to those described by Coronado in 1541.

Archaeological evidence suggests that Quivira was located near the Great Bend of the Arkansas River in central Kansas. The remains of several Indigenous communities have been found near Lyons along Cow Creek and the Little Arkansas River along with articles of Spanish manufacture dating from Coronado's time.

The Quivirans were almost certainly the Wichita. Coronado's meager descriptions of Quivira resemble more recent post-contact Wichita communities. The Quivirans seem to have been numerous, based on the number of settlements Coronado visited, with a population of at least 10,000 persons. They were good farmers as well as bison hunters. Judging from Coronado's description, they were a healthy, peaceful people.

The nation of Harahey that Coronado found on the borders of Quivira may have been located on the Smoky Hill River near the present city of Salina, Kansas.

The next confirmed European visitor to the Great Bend region after Coronado was Étienne de Bourgmont. In 1724, along with a company of Kaw and other Indigenous explorers, de Bourgmont traveled westward from the Missouri River to a large Indigenous community believed to have a Plains Apache population. The village was near Lyons, precisely where Quivira had been almost 200 years earlier.

The original inhabitants of Quivira migrated to eastern Kansas and south to Oklahoma. Their reason for relocating may have been to escape the encroachment of the Plains Apache, whose expansion created war and hostilities among the nations of the Great Plains. It also appears that the 18th-century Wichita were fewer in number than in the 16th century. This decrease is likely due to smallpox and other European diseases.

== Etymology ==
The origin of the word "Quivira" is uncertain. The inhabitants of Coronado's Quivira called themselves "Tancoa" and "Tabas. These two names are similar to the Wichita tribes, the Tawakonis and Taovayas.

== Expedition ==
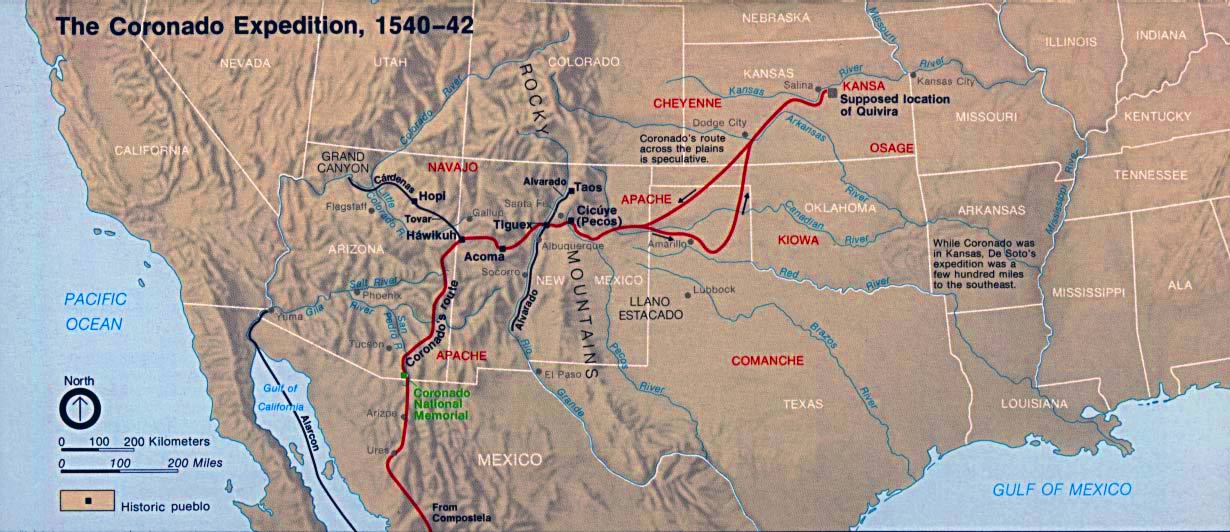
Route of the Coronado Expedition, 1540–1542.

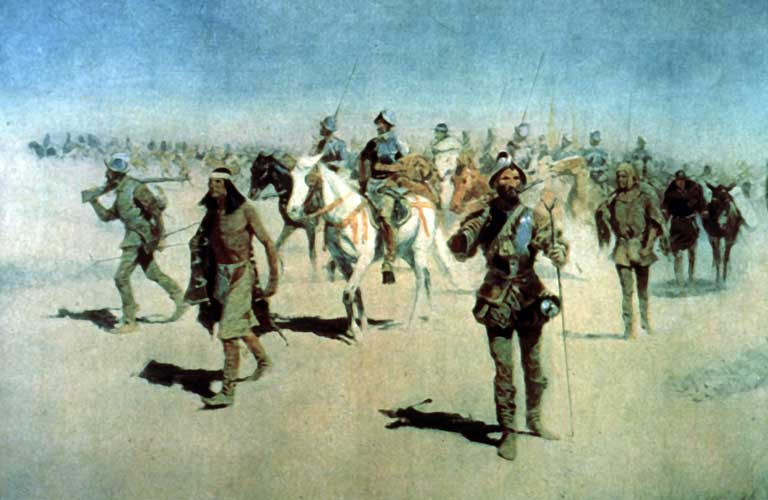
Depiction of Coronado's expedition.Coronado sets out to the north, oil painting by Frederic Remington, c. 1900.

In 1540, Spaniard Francisco Vásquez de Coronado commanded a large expedition north from Mexico to search for wealth and the Seven Cities of Cibola. Instead of wealth, he found Indigenous farmers living in an array of communities and villages in what are now Arizona and New Mexico. These were the Hopi, Zuni, Rio Grande Pueblo, Apache, and Navajo peoples.

As Coronado arrived at the Rio Grande, he was disappointed by the lack of wealth among the Pueblo people, but he heard from a Plains Indian informant dubbed “The Turk” of a wealthy nation named Quivira far to the east, ruled by a bearded king named "Tartarrax", who wore a golden bracemate, worshipped a cross of gold, and an image of the Queen of Heaven. Hearing of this, Coronado commanded an expedition of more than 1000 Spanish and Indigenous persons onto the Great Plains in 1541. The Turk served as the expedition’s adviser.

On his journey, Coronado traversed the Llano Estacado, home to two Indigenous nations: the Querecho and Teya. He was heading southeast when the Teyas told him that the Turk was taking him in the wrong direction and that Quivira was to the north. It appears the Turk was luring the Spaniards away from New Mexico with tales of wealth in Quivira, hoping perhaps that they would get lost in the vastness of the Great Plains. Coronado sent most of his slow-moving expeditionary force back to New Mexico. With 30 mounted Spaniards, Indigenous persons, priests, the Turk and Teya captives forced into service, Coronado changed course northward in search of Quivira. After a march of more than 30 days, he found a large river, probably the Arkansas, and soon met several Indigenous bison hunters, who guided him to Quivira.

== Spanish visit ==
Coronado found Quivira "well settled.... The land itself being very fat and black and being very well watered by the rivulets and springs and rivers. I found prunes like those of Spain, and nuts and very good sweet grapes and mulberries." It was, he said, the best land he had seen during his long trek north from Mexico. Coronado spent 25 days in Quivira and traveled about 25 leagues 100 km (65 mi) from one end of the country to the other. He found nothing more than straw-thatched villages of up to 200 houses each and fields of corn, beans, and squash, Tartarrax was indeed found, but he was naked, and wore a copper necklace, not a golden bracemate. Coronado found no gold, other than a single small piece, which he speculated the Indigenous owner acquired from a member of his own expedition.

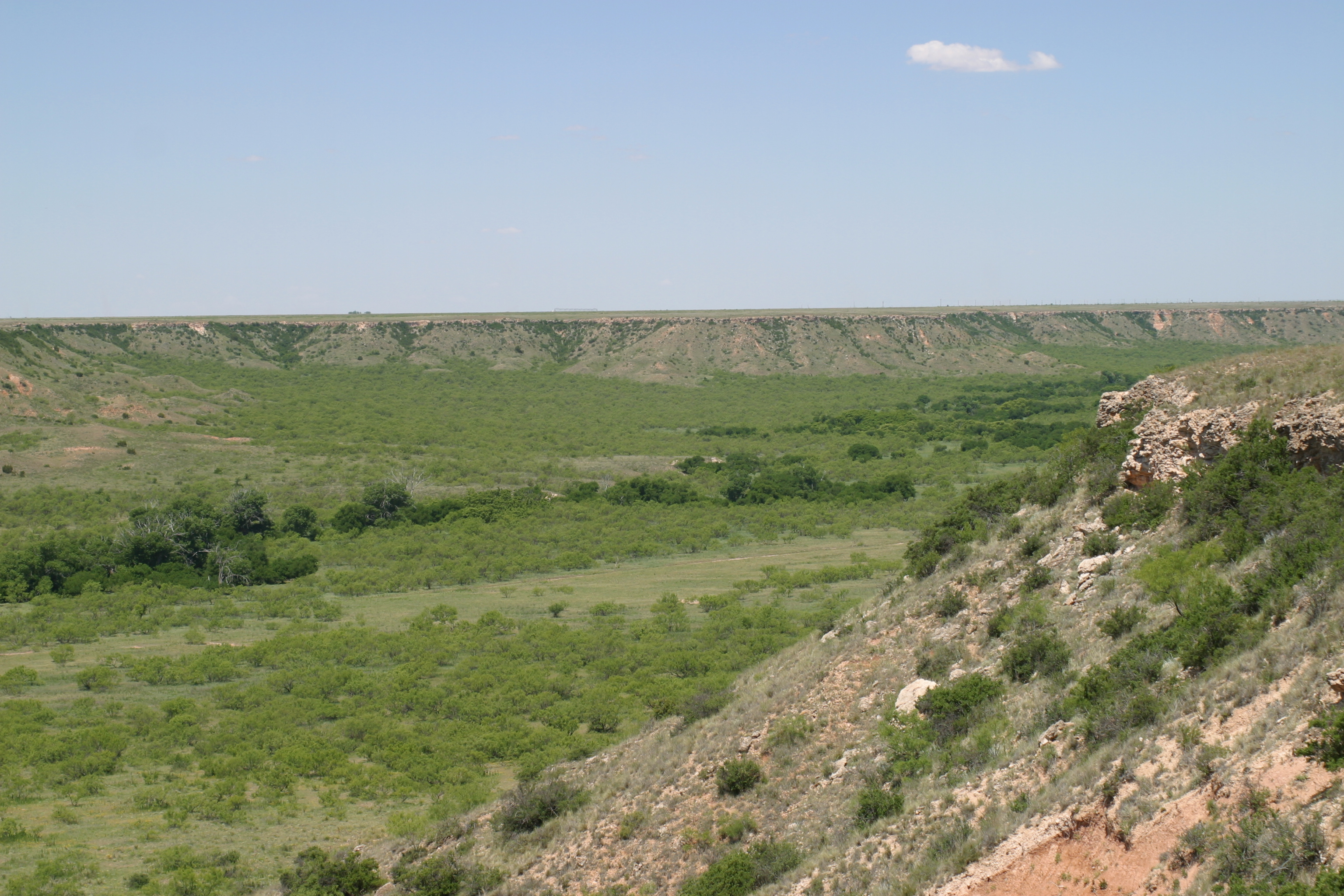
Coronado found the Teyas Indians in Blanco Canyon, east of present-day Lubbock, Texas. The Querechos lived on the flat Llano Estacado above the canyon.

The Spaniards described the locals as being a "large people of good build" with many of the men being more than 6 ft (180 cm) and seemed very tall to the Spaniards. Both sexes wore minimal attire.

Coronado was escorted to the border of Quivira at an area called Tabas where the neighboring nation of Harahey began. He summoned the "Lord of Harahey" who, with a retinue of nearly 200, came to meet the Spanish. The Harahey delegation were "all naked — with bows and some sort of things on their heads, and their privy parts slightly covered. It was the same sort of place ... and of about the same size as Quivira." Disappointed at his failure to find wealth, Coronado turned toward New Mexico and marched back across the plains, met the rest of his army there, and the next year returned to Mexico. Before leaving Quivira, Coronado ordered the Turk executed by garroting. The Coronado expedition had failed in its quest for gold.

Coronado left behind in New Mexico several Catholic priests and their helpers, including Friar Juan de Padilla. Padilla journeyed back to Quivira with a Portuguese assistant and several Indigenous converts. The friar and most of his companions were soon killed by people from Quivira, apparently because he wished to leave their country to visit their enemies, the Guas. Portuguese and Native survivors reported the story.

== Later expeditions ==
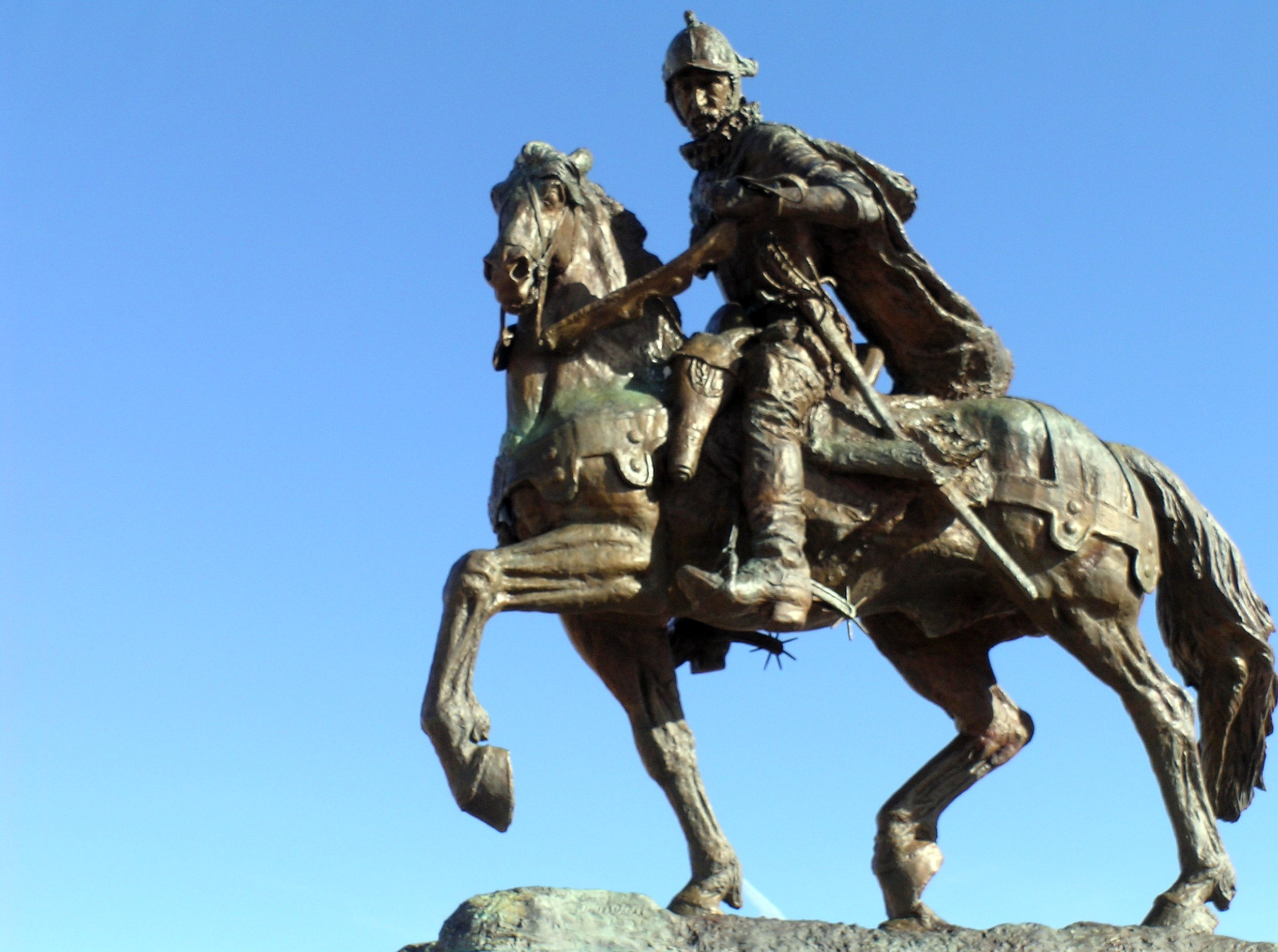
Juan de Oñate commanded an expedition to Quivira in 1601. Oñate was married to a granddaughter of Hernán Cortés and Isabel Moctezuma.

In 1594, Francisco Leyba (Leyva) Bonilla and Antonio de Humana (Umana) made another attempt to find the Quivira of Coronado, though it was denounced as unauthorized by Spanish officials. Only Jusepe Gutierrez, a Nahua, returned from this journey. He related that Leyba had killed Umana in a quarrel and that he (Jusepe) had deserted the expedition.

After this, in 1601, the governor of New Mexico, Juan de Oñate, undertook another expedition in search of Quivira. He found settlements of the Escanjaque and Rayados in the Central Great Plains, but no gold or silver. He learned that Leyba and other members of the Umana and Lebya expedition had been killed by Indians. In 1606, 800 people from Quivira reportedly visited Oñate in New Mexico to trade.

In his 1634 expedition, Captain Alonzo Vaca found Quivira 300 leagues east of New Mexico (this suggests more than 1,200 km (750 mi)). Another reputed expedition was undertaken in 1662 by Diego Dionisio de Penalosa, who allegedly found a large settlement he called a city, but a modern re-examination of his account concluded that the story is fanciful.

Spanish accounts said Quivirans were enemies of the Escanjaques. In 1675 and 1678 came "two Spanish royal orders for the conquest of Quivira".

== In cartography ==
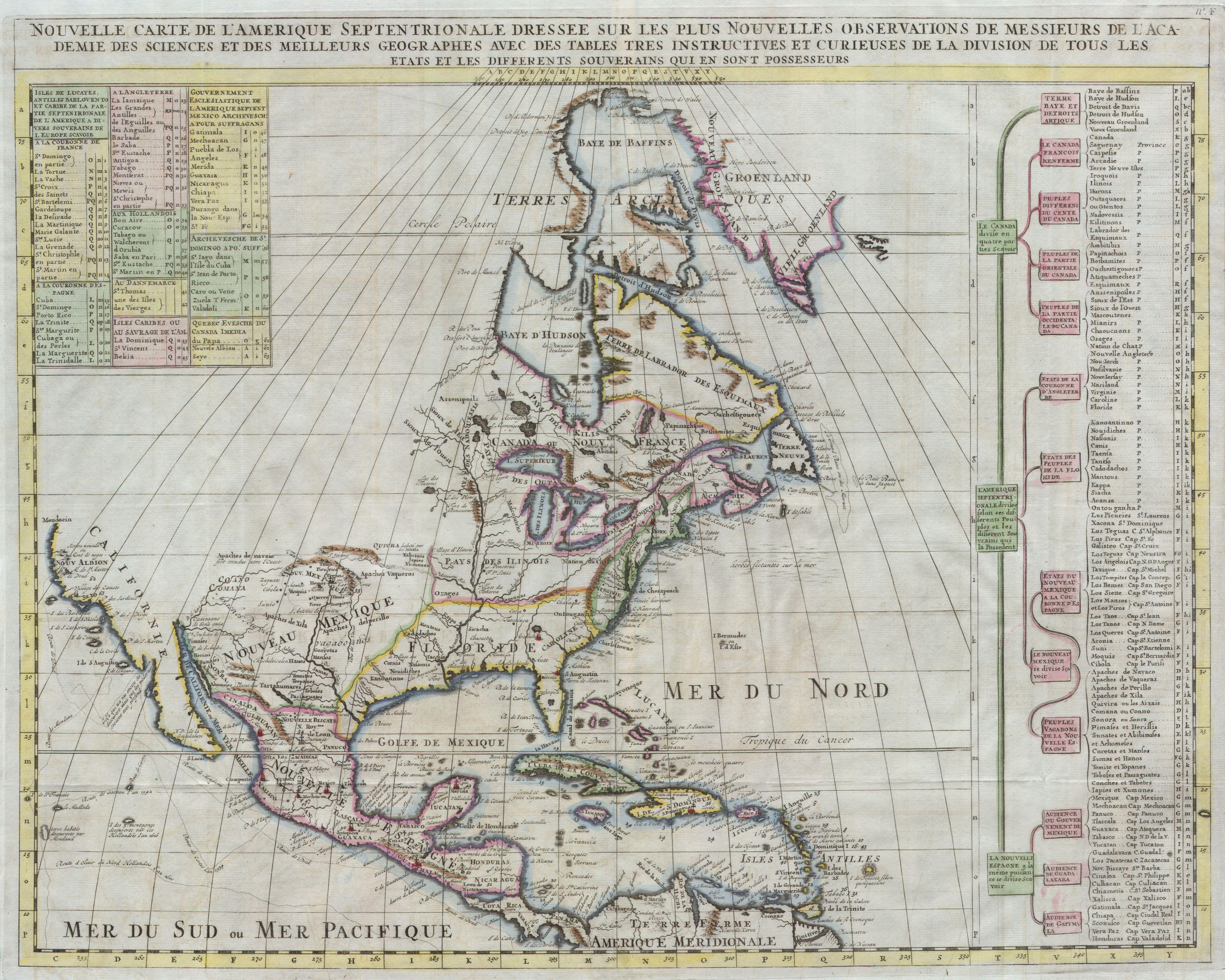
1720 North America Geographicus by Dutch cartographer Henri Abraham Chatelain

On early 16th- and 17th-century maps of North America, a large region including what is now Kansas, Oklahoma, southeastern Colorado, northeastern New Mexico and the Texas Panhandle was named "Quivira".

== Legacy ==
The last remnants of the formerly extensive cartographic region of Quivira now is the city of Lake Quivira and the Quivira National Wildlife Refuge in Kansas.

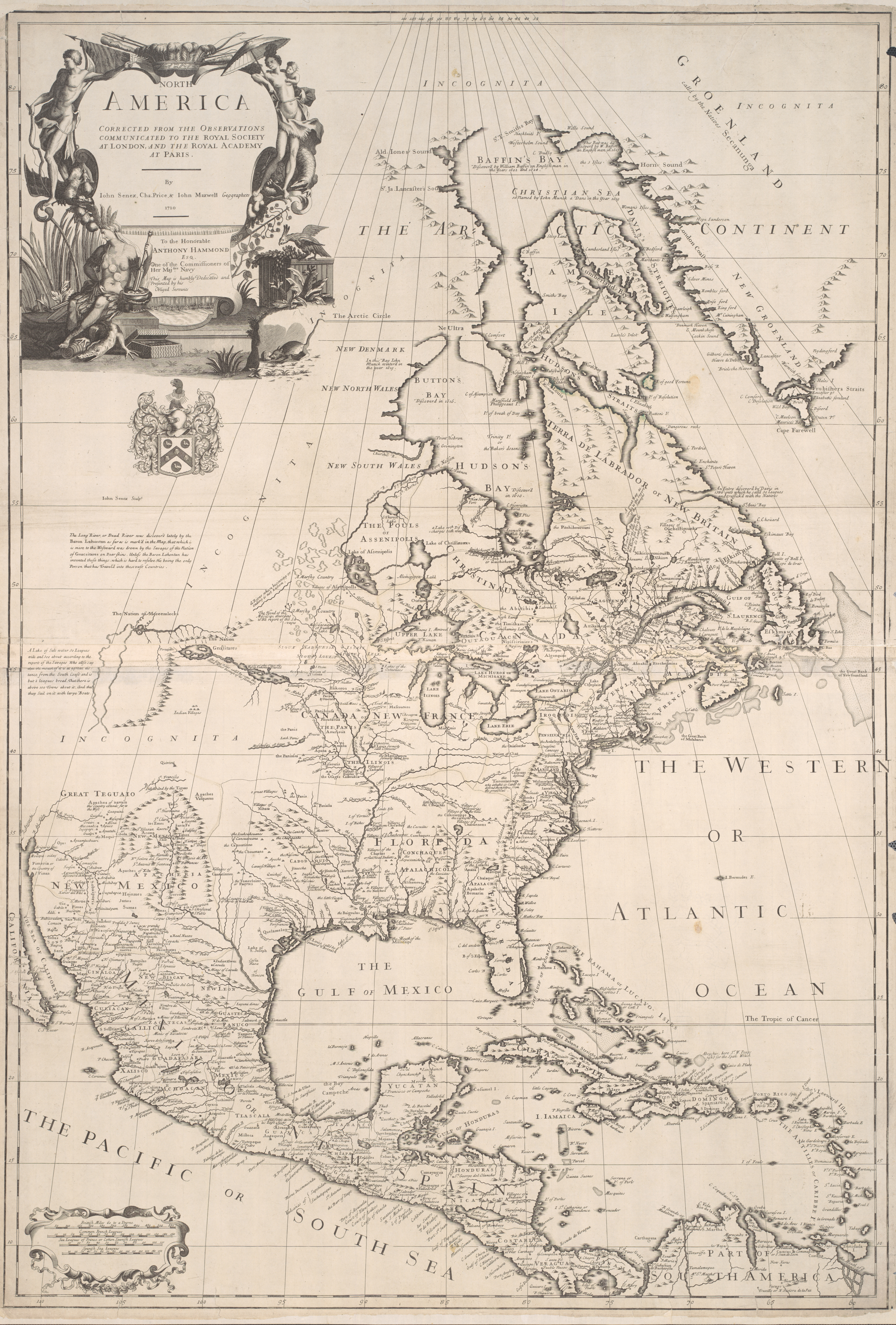
Quivira is located above New Mexico in the "Incognito Lands" in this 1710 map by British cartographer John Senex

In addition, the "Quivira Council" of the Boy Scouts serves the area of southwestern Kansas around Wichita; the central part of the area that was traditionally called Quivira. The first several yearbooks printed by the University of Kansas were entitled Quivira. Also, a major arterial road runs through the Johnson County suburbs of Kansas City named "Quivira Road".

A large abandoned pueblo in Torrance County, New Mexico, was named "La Gran Quivira" ("the Great Quivira"). The community was located within Tompiro-speaking Pueblo territory. During the early period of the Spanish conquest, when the town was called Pueblo de Las Humanas, a mission was built here. In the 1670s, the Tompiro communities were abandoned and absorbed into other Pueblos. The remains of Gran Quivira Pueblo and the mission are today part of Salinas Pueblo Missions National Monument.

From the days of Coronado the name of "Quivira" had been associated with the idea of a great unknown city, of wealth and splendor, situated somewhere on the Eastern Plains; and it is not at all unlikely that when some party from the Rio Grande Valley, in search of game or gold, crossed the mountains and the wilderness lying to the east, and was suddenly amazed by the apparition of a dead city, silent and tenantless, but bearing the evidences of large population, of vast resources, of architectural knowledge, mechanical skill, and wonderful energy, they should have associated with it the stories heard from childhood of the mythical center of riches and power, and called the new-found wonder the Gran Quivira.

== See also ==
- Akakor
- Antillia
- City of the Caesars
- El Dorado
- Fountain of Youth
- Kuhikugu
- La Canela
- La Plata Mountains
- List of mythological places
- Lost city
- Lost City of Z
- Manuscript 512
- Paititi
- Ratanabá
- Seven Cities of Gold
- Sierra de la Plata
- Tobias-Thompson Complex
- Zuni-Cibola Complex
