= Teya people =

Historic Native American people from Texas

Teya
Total population
- extinct as a tribe, may have ultimately merged into Mescalero Apache

Regions with significant populations
- Southern Plains, present-day Texas

Languages
- possibly a Caddoan language

Religion
- Indigenous religion

Related ethnic groups
- possibly Wichita peoples

Teyas were a Native American people living near what is now Lubbock, Texas, who first made contact with Europeans during the 1541 Francisco Vásquez de Coronado expedition. The tribal affiliation and language of the Teyas is unknown, although many scholars believe they spoke a Caddoan language and were related to the Wichita tribe, encountered by Coronado in Quivira.

== Name ==
Teyas was the name the Rio Grande Pueblo Indians called them.

The term Teyas is not to be confused with the Tejas people, another term for the Hasinai, a Caddo band.

== Identity of the Teyas ==
Scholars differ in their guesses as to the identity of the Teyas and their language. Some anthropologists and historians speculate that they were Apache. Other scholars believe they were related to the Rio Grande Pueblos, perhaps speaking a Tanoan language. They may have later become known to the Spanish as the Jumano. It is possible, however, that Jumano was only a generic description of Plains Indians rather than referring to a distinct tribe.

== Lifeways ==
The Teyas had close trade relations with the Pueblos, but Coronado was told that, in the 1520s, they destroyed several Pueblo villages in the Galisteo Basin near present-day Santa Fe, New Mexico. That implies that the Teyas were numerous, powerful, far ranging and that they participated in the politics of the Pueblos, thus strengthening the case that they were Tanoans.

A narrow plurality of experts, however, believe that the Teyas were Caddoan language-speakers related to the Wichita peoples whom Coronado found in Quivira in central Kansas.

The Teyas may have not been full-time nomads of the Plains; they may have also inhabited farming villages further east. Agrarian tribes of the region commonly ventured onto the plains for extended buffalo hunts. Archaeologists have found the remains of many farming villages of the time (Wheeler phase including the Edwards Archaeological Site, believed to be Caddoan), near the Washita River in southwestern Oklahoma. The proximity of the Teyas to the Washita villages suggests a relationship. The description of the Teyas as painted and tattooed also points to them being Caddoans, since Wichita were called "Raccoon People" for their custom of tattooing around their eyes—a custom the Teyas shared.

The Teya may have been none of the above but instead may have been a Coahuiltecan or Tonkawa group. Most of these tribes resided in southern and central Texas. An old man who said he had previously met Spaniards, probably Cabeza de Vaca, gives credence to a southern origin of the Teyas.

The ethnic identification of the Teyas may never be determined, but, if so, it would be most useful in untangling the complexities of the protohistorical period on the Southern Plains. The later Escanjaque Indians, Aguacane, and Iscani may be descended from the Teyas.

== Colonialism ==
In 1541, the Spanish conquistador Francisco Vásquez de Coronado led an expedition onto the Great Plains from the Rio Grande pueblos in New Mexico. Coronado’s objective was to find a rich country called Quivira.

Traversing the Texas panhandle Coronado met two groups of Indians: the Querechos and the Teyas. The Querechos were nomadic buffalo hunters, almost certainly Apaches, and they inhabited the Llano Estacado. The Teyas lived in the canyons below the escarpment on the eastern edge of the Llano. The Querechos and Teyas were enemies. The discovery of Spanish artifacts from an archaeological site 35 miles northeast of Lubbock makes Blanco Canyon near the headwaters of the Brazos River the likely place where Coronado first encountered a large settlement of Teyas.

== Culture of the Teyas ==
The Teyas were described as nomadic buffalo hunters who lived in tents. However, they had additional resources. The canyons had trees and flowing streams and the Teyas grew or foraged for beans, but the Coronado chroniclers state they did not "sow corn, nor eat bread, but instead raw meat." The Spanish noted the presence of mulberries, roses, grapes, nuts (probably pecans) and plums.

After this first contact, Coronado traveled an additional four days and encountered a settlement called Cona that extended for three days travel along a small river in a canyon two or three miles wide. It is unclear whether Coronado followed the Brazos downstream or journeyed to a different canyon to visit Cona.

"The country was well occupied," said the chroniclers.

The Coronado chroniclers described the Teyas as intelligent and formidable archers. One of them shot an arrow that passed through both shoulders of a bison, "which would be a good shot for a musket." The women were well-dressed and modest, covering their whole bodies by wearing a petticoat beneath a fringed cloak with sleeves. One of the women was "as white as a Castillian lady except that she had her chin painted like a Moorish woman." Coronado commented that they "tattoo their bodies and faces, and are large people of very fine appearance."

One of the intriguing events was Coronado's meeting among the Teyas an old blind bearded man—a beard being a rarity among Indians—who said that he had met four Spaniards far to the south. He was probably talking about Cabeza de Vaca who with three shipmates made his way across southern Texas nearly a decade before Coronado.

== What happened to the Teyas? ==
The Teyas, or at least their name, disappeared from history soon after Coronado encountered them. They may have been pushed out of their west Texas home by advancing Apaches. They likely merged into the Lipan Apache, who in turn merged into the Mescalero Apache in New Mexico today. If the Spanish met Teya descendants later at a different location, they were not recognized as the same people Coronado encountered.
