= Juan de Zaldívar =

Spanish official and explorer in New Spain (1514–1570)

- Born: 1514; Basque Country, Spain
- Died: 1570; Guadalajara, Jalisco, New Spain
- Spouse: Marina de Mendoza
- Children: 8
- Parent(s): Ruy Díaz de Zaldívar; María Pérez de Oñate
- Relatives: Cristóbal de Oñate (maternal uncle)

Juan de Zaldívar (1514–1570) was a Spanish official and explorer in New Spain. He served as a city councillor of Guadalajara from 1539 to 1570. He explored Northern New Spain (the modern-day Mexican states of Sinaloa and Sonora as well as southeastern Arizona) in search of the mythical towns of Cíbola and Quivira. By the 1560s, he was the owner of mines, farms and slaves, and one of the richest men in New Spain.

== Early life ==
Juan de Zaldívar was born in 1514 near Vitoria in Basque Country, Spain. His father was Ruy Díaz de Zaldívar and his mother, María Pérez de Oñate. His maternal uncles were Cristóbal de Oñate, who served as the Lieutenant-Governor and interim Governor of Nueva Galicia in the 1530s and 1540s, and Juan de Oñate, an administrator of the Spanish Crown.

== Career ==
Zaldívar emigrated to New Spain in 1533. Six years later, in 1539, he was appointed as a city councillor of Guadalajara by Francisco Vázquez de Coronado. He served in this capacity until his death in 1570.

Meanwhile, Zaldívar was asked by Coronado to explore Northern New Spain (the modern-day Mexican states of Sinaloa and Sonora as well as southeastern Arizona) in search of the gold in the mythical town of Cíbola in 1539. By 1541, he was asked to find another mythical town, Quivira.

By 1566, Zaldívar was the owner of mines, slaves, and farms. He had become one of the richest men in New Spain.

== Personal life ==
Zaldívar married Marina de Mendoza, the daughter of Luis Marín, a wealthy conquistador who was involved in the 1521 fall of Tenochtitlan alongside Hernán Cortés. They had eight children.

== Death ==
Zaldívar died in 1570.
