= Alexander Lesser =

American anthropologist

Alexander Lesser (1902–1982) was an American anthropologist. Working in the Boasian tradition of American cultural anthropology, he adopted critical stances on several ideas of his fellow Boasians, and became known as an original and critical thinker, pioneering several ideas that later became widely accepted within anthropology.

== Biography ==
Like many anthropologists in the United States at the time, Lesser was Jewish. He studied at Columbia University, completing his doctoral dissertation there in 1929. He studied philosophy with John Dewey as an undergraduate and did his graduate studies in anthropology with Franz Boas. His first wife was Gene Weltfish, a fellow anthropologist and Caddoanist. He studied the culture and history of the Pawnee people and other Plains Indians, specializing in the study of kinship among the Siouan peoples. His 1933 work on the Ghost dance among the Pawnee was the first anthropological study of a cultural revitalization movement. Lesser was a critic of the psychological anthropology of Ruth Benedict, preferring a more historicizing mode of explanation of cultural phenomena. His focus on history also led him to criticize the ahistorical structural functionalism of Alfred Radcliffe-Brown. In 1939, Lesser publicly broke with the Boasian historical particularism, arguing that it is possible to demonstrate general rules of cultural evolution.

During World War II he worked as a social science analyst for the government and subsequently spent a number of years directing the Association of American Indian Affairs, and serving on the National Research Council. In 1947, along with 10 coworkers he was terminated from the State Department because of his political views, but he successfully defended himself in court and received an apology from the government and had his record cleared.

Besides his contribution to Plains ethnography, Lesser is well known for his documentation of the Kitsai language. Following Boas, he was also among the first anthropologists to reject the notion of Race as a valid biological construct. In 1935 he wrote, ""We do not ask whether blond horses are smarter than black ones, because we have no a priori prejudice against skin color in horses...Race attitudes, race theories and race problems must be reduced to the place where they belong, the realm of social phenomena" (Lesser 1935-36:49)." He held teaching positions at Columbia University, Brooklyn College, and Brandeis University before ending his career at Hofstra University, where he was chair of the department of anthropology and sociology from 1960 to 1965. Through his career he taught mostly undergraduates and had no doctoral students of his own.

== Select publications ==
- 1928. Bibliography of American Folklore. Journal of American Folk-lore 41:1-60.
- 1929. Kinship origins in the Light of Some Distributions. American Anthropologist 31:710-730.
- 1930a. Some Aspects of Siouan Kinship. Proceedings of the Twenty-Third International Congress of Americanists, lk. 563–571.
- 1930b. Levirate and Fraternal Polyandry among the Pawnee. Man 30:98-101.
- 1931. Superstition. Journal of Philosophy 28:617-628.
- 1932. Composition of the Caddoan Linguistic Stock. (Kaasautor Gene Weltfish.) Smithsonian Miscellaneous Collections, Vol. 87, No. 6.
- 1933a. Cultural Significance of the Ghost Dance. American Anthropologist 35:108-115.
- 1933b. The Pawnee Ghost Dance Hand Game. Columbia University Contributions to Anthropology, Vol. XVI. Columbia University Press, New York. (Reprint edition with new author's foreword 1978, University of Wisconsin Press, Madison).
- 1935. Functionalism in Social Anthropology. American Anthropologist 37:385-393.
- 1935b On the Meaning of Race. Race: Devoted to Social, Political and Economic Equality 1 (1):21-24, 48–49.
- 1939a. Problems Versus Subject Matter as Directives of Research. American Anthropologist 41:574-582.
- 1939b. Research Procedures and Laws of Culture. Philosophy of Science 6:345-355.
- 1952. Evolution in Social Anthropology. Southwestern Journal of Anthropology 6:134-146.
- 1958. Siouan Kinship. University Microfilms International, Ann Arbor.
- 1961a. Social Fields and the Evolution of Society. Southwestern Journal of Anthropology 18:40-48.
- 1961b. Education and the Future of Tribalism in the United States: The Case of the American Indian. Social Science Review 35:135-143
- 1969. Kitsai Phonology and Morphophonemics. (Coauthor Salvador Bucca.) International Journal of American Linguistics 35:7-19.
- 1979. Caddoan Kinship Systems. Nebraska History 60:260-271.
- 1981. Franz Boas and the Modernization of Anthropology. In Totems and Teachers: Perspectives on the History of Anthropology. Columbia University Press, New York.
- 1984. History, Evolution and the Concept of Culture: Selected Papers by Alexander Lesser, edited by Sidney W. Mintz. Cambridge University Press, New York.
