= Wichita people =

Confederation of Native Americans

Wichita and Affiliated Tribes
Kirikirʔi꞉s Kitikiti'sh
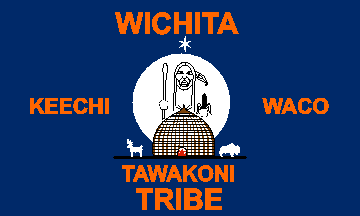

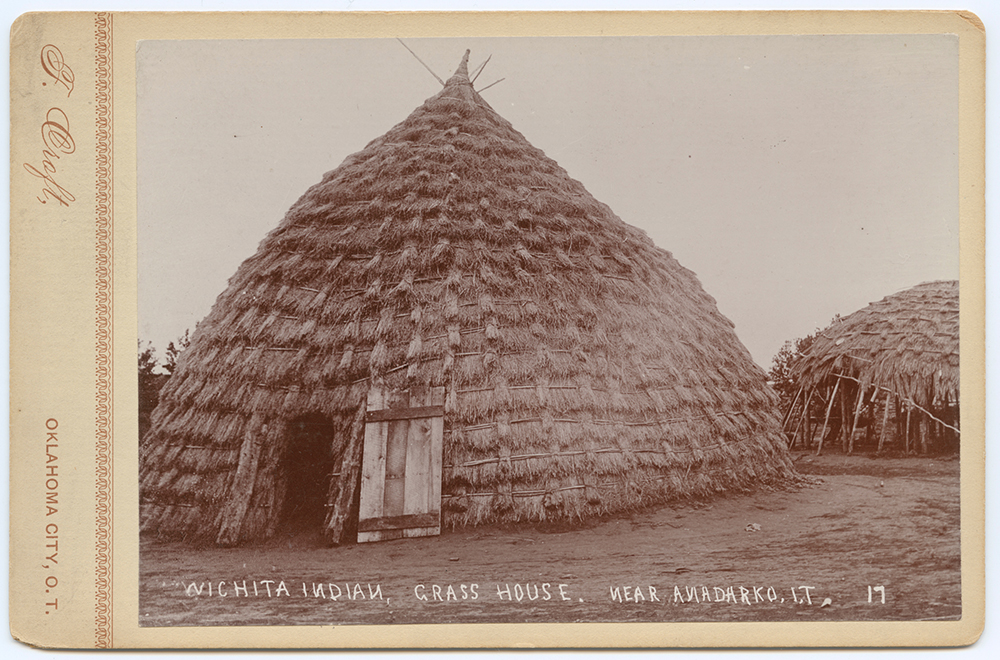
- Wichita grass lodge, near Anadarko, Oklahoma Territory, c. 1885–1900

Total population
- 2,953 (2018)

Regions with significant populations
- United States (Oklahoma, formerly Kansas and Texas)

Languages
- English, formerly Wichita and Kichai

Religion
- Native American Church, Christianity, Indigenous religion

Related ethnic groups
- Caddo, Pawnee, Arikara, Kichai, Caddoan Mississippian culture

The Wichita people or Kirikirʔi꞉s are a confederation of Southern Plains Native American tribes. Historically they spoke the Wichita language and Kichai language, both Caddoan languages. Their ancestral homelands are in Oklahoma, Texas, and Kansas.

Today, Wichita tribes, which include the Kichai people (ki:che:ss), Waco (wí:koʔ), Taovaya, Tawakoni (tawá:kharih), Yscani, and the Wichita proper (kirikirʔi꞉s or Guichita), are federally recognized as the Wichita and Affiliated Tribes (Wichita, Keechi, Waco and Tawakoni).

== Government ==
Map of Wichita and Affiliated Tribes' tribal jurisdictional area (OTSA) and nearby jurisdiction areas, shared with Caddo Nation and Delaware Nation.

The Wichita and Affiliated Tribes are headquartered in Anadarko, Oklahoma. Their tribal jurisdictional area is in Caddo County, Oklahoma. The Wichitas are a self-governance tribe, who operate their own housing authority and issue tribal vehicle tags.

As of 2025, the current administration is: The current tribal administration is as follows.

- President: Amber Silverhorn-Wolfe
- Vice President: Tasha R. Mousseau, J.D.
- Secretary: Starr Chavez
- Treasurer: Vanessa Vance
- Committee Member: Claudia Spybuck
- Committee Member: Matt Roberson
- Committee Member: John Bowman

== Economic development ==
The tribe owns the Sugar Creek Casino, several restaurants, the Sugar Creek Event Center, and Hinton Travel Inn in Hinton. It owns a smoke shop, travel plaza, and historical center in Anadarko. Their annual economic impact in 2010 was $4.5 million.

== Culture ==
The Wichita language is one of the Caddoan languages. They are related by language and culture to the Pawnee, with whom they have close relations.

The Wichita lived in settled villages with domed-shaped, grass lodges, sometimes up to 30 feet (9.1 m) in diameter. The Wichita were successful hunters, farmers, traders, and negotiators. Their historical homelands stretched from San Antonio, Texas, in the south to Great Bend, Kansas, in the north. A semi-sedentary people, they occupied northern Texas in the early 18th century. They traded with other Southern Plains Indians on both sides of the Red River and south to Waco.

The Wichita made much of their own art, including ceramic pottery that greatly fascinated French and Spanish traders. To the untrained eye Wichita pottery was "virtually indistinguishable from the Osage and Pawnee", two other neighboring Indigenous groups.

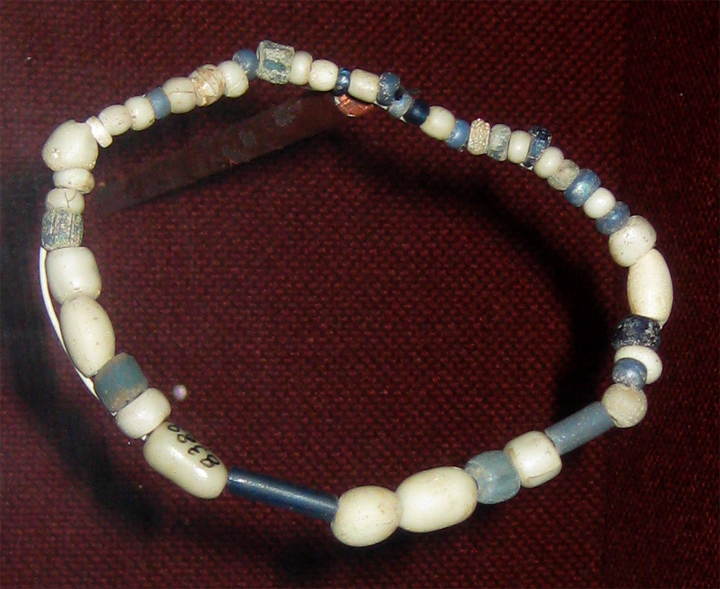
Trade beads found at a Wichita village site, c. 1740, collection of the Oklahoma History Center

Historically, for much of the year, the Wichita lived in huts made of forked cedar poles covered by dry grasses. In the winter, they followed American bison (buffalo) in a seasonal hunt and lived in hunting camps. Wichita people relied heavily on bison, using all parts—for clothing, food and cooking fat, winter shelter, leather supplies, sinew, medicine, and even armor. Each spring, Wichita families settled in their villages for another season of cultivating crops. Eventually, horses played a large role in the Wichita people's lifestyle. Increased access to horses in the mid 17th century caused Wichita hunting styles and seasons to become longer and more community-oriented. The Wichita economy also focused on horticulture, root-gathering, and fruits and nuts.

Wichita people wore clothing from tanned hides, which the women prepared and sewed. They often decorated their dresses with elk canine teeth. Both men and women tattooed their faces and bodies with solid and dotted lines and circles.

Wichita people had a history of intermarriage and alliance with other groups. Notably, the women of the Wichita worked with the Pueblo to harvest crops and engage in trade. Pueblo women were recorded to have intermarried with Wichita people and lived together in Wichita villages.

The social structure was organized by ranking of each tribe. Tribes were also led by two chiefs.

=== Names ===
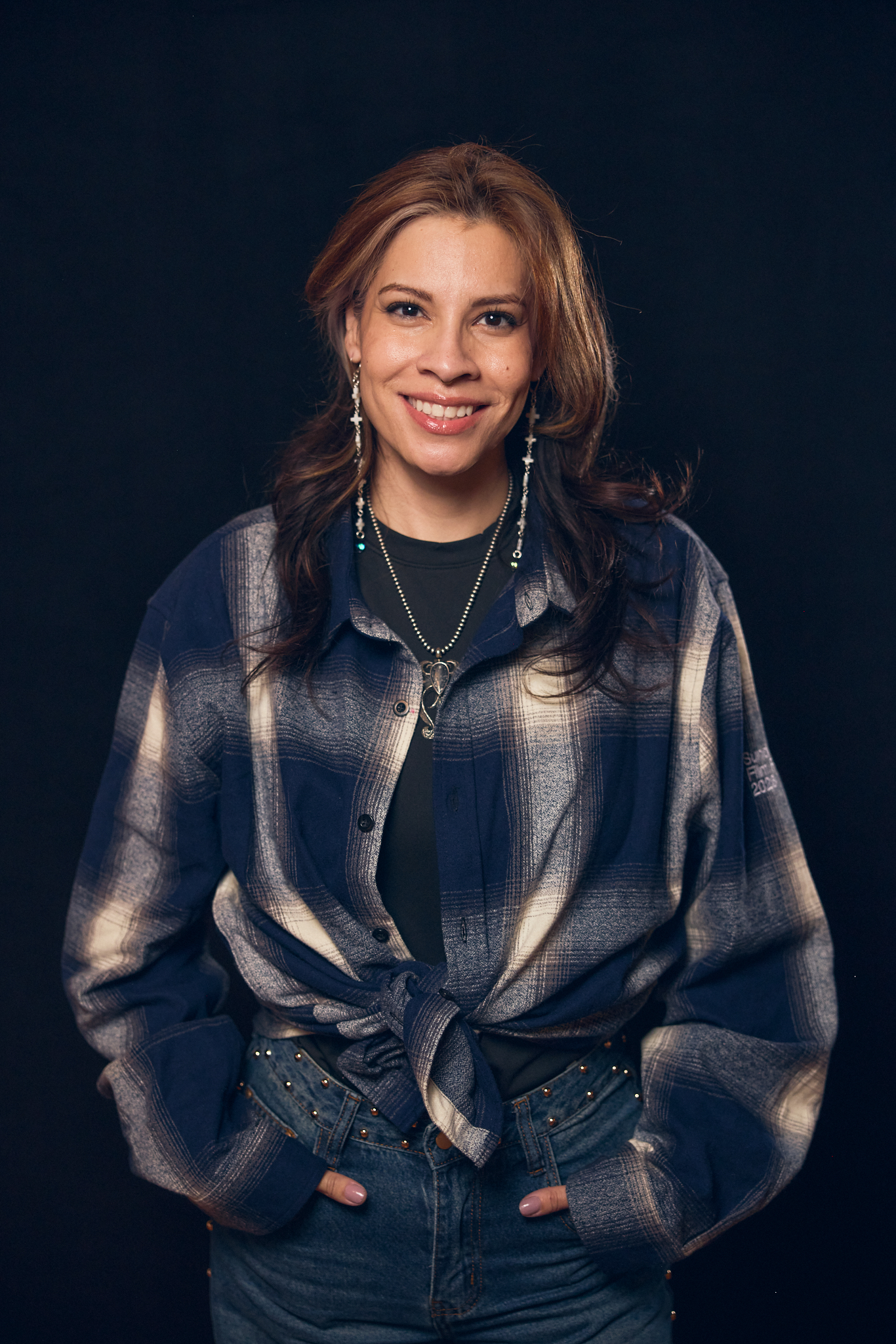
Cara Jade Myers (Wichita/Kiowa), actor

The Wichita tribes call themselves Kirikirʔi꞉s, sometimes spelled Kitikiti'sh ("raccoon-eyed people"), because of the historical practice of tattooing marks around their eyes. The kindred Pawnee call them Kírikuuruks or Kírikuruks ("bear-eyed people") and the Arikara refer to them as Čirikuúnux (a reference to the Wichita practice of tattoos). The Kiowa call them T’ó:g̶út (tattoo faces), Bélg̶útgàu ("lip-marked-ones"), or D̶á:g̶útk’yàgàu ("eye-marked men").

=== Bands ===
Wichita people have been a loose confederation of related peoples on the Southern Plains, including such bands or sub-tribes as Taovayas (Tawehash), Tawakonis, Wacos (who appear to have been the Yscani or Iscanis of earlier times), and Guichitas or Wichita Proper; smaller bands are listed as well: Akwits (also Akwesh, Asidahetsh, or Asidahesh, a former northern Pawnee splinter group, which joined the Wichita), Itaz, Kishkat, and Korishkitsu (the two latter names may be a Wichita name for the Kichai). The Taovaya were the most important in the 18th century. The French called the Wichita peoples Panis Piqués (Pawnee Picts) or Panis Noirs (Black Pawnees), because they practiced tattooing; sometimes the Panis Piqués or Panis Noirs are included into the listing of Wichita sub-tribes, but it seems that there were no known separate sub-tribe which can be identified by this name. One Pawnee splinter grouping known as Panismahas moved from what is now Nebraska to the Texas-Arkansas border regions where they lived with the Taovayas.

=== Language ===
The Wichita people had a unified language system with minor dialectical differences based on the geography of unique tribes. Derived from the Caddoan language, much of the Wichita language was indistinguishable between tribes they shared close alliances with.

=== Cultural institutions ===
In 2018, the Wichita Tribes opened the Wichita Tribal History Center in Anadarko, which shares Wichita history, archaeology, visual arts, and culture with the public.

The Wichita Annual Dance, a powwow, is held at the Wichita Tribal Park on US-281, north of Anadarko, every August.

== History ==
=== Precontact history ===
After the man and woman were made they dreamed that things were made for them, and when they woke they had the things of which they had dreamed... The woman was given an ear of corn... It was to be the food of the people that should exist in the future, to be used generation after generation. —Tawakoni Jim in The Mythology of the Wichita, 1904

The Ancestral Wichita people lived in the eastern Great Plains from the Red River in Arkansas north to Nebraska for at least 2,000 years. Early Wichita people were hunters and gatherers who gradually adopted agriculture. Farming villages were developed about 900 CE on terraces above the Washita and South Canadian Rivers in present-day Oklahoma. The women of these 10th-century communities cultivated varieties of maize, beans, and squash (known as the Three Sisters), marsh elder (Iva annua), and tobacco, which was important for religious purposes. The men hunted deer, rabbits, turkey, and, primarily, bison, and caught fish and harvested mussels from the rivers. These villagers lived in rectangular, thatched-roof houses.

Archaeologists describe the Washita River Phase from 1250 to 1450, when local populations grew and villages of up to 20 houses were spaced every two or so miles along the rivers. These farmers may have had contact with the Panhandle culture villages in the Oklahoma and Texas Panhandles, farming villages along the Canadian River. The Panhandle villagers showed signs of adopting cultural characteristics of the Pueblo peoples of the Rio Grande Valley, with whom they interacted. In the late 15th century, most of these Washita River villages were abandoned for reasons that are not known today.

==== Great Bend settlements and council circles ====
Numerous archaeological sites in central Kansas near the Great Bend of the Arkansas River share common traits and are collectively known as the "Great Bend aspect." Radiocarbon dates from these sites range from AD 1450 to 1700. Great Bend aspect sites are generally accepted as ancestral to the Wichita peoples described by Francisco Vásquez de Coronado and other early European explorers. The discovery of limited quantities of European artifacts, such as chain mail and iron axe heads at several Great Bend sites, suggests contact of these people with early Spanish explorers.

Great Bend aspect peoples' subsistence economy included agriculture, hunting, gathering, and fishing. Villages were located on the upper terraces of rivers, and crops appear to have been grown on the fertile floodplains below. Primary crops were maize, beans, squash, and sunflowers, cultivated for their seeds. Gathered foods included walnut and hickory nuts, and the fruits of plum, hackberry, and grape. Remains of animal bones in Great Aspect sites include bison, elk, deer, pronghorn, and dog, one of the few domesticated animals in the pre-Contact Plains.

Several village sites contain the remains of unusual structures called "council circles," located at the center of settlements. Archaeological excavations suggest they consist of a central patio surrounded by four semi-subterranean structures. The function of the council circles is unclear. Archaeologist Waldo Wedel suggested in 1967 that they may be ceremonial structures, possibly associated with solstice observations. Recent analysis suggests that many non-local artifacts occur exclusively or primarily within council circles, implying the structures were occupied by political and/or ritual leaders of the Great Bend aspect peoples. Other archaeologists leave open the possibility that the council circle earthworks served a defensive role.

One of these sites was the city Etzanoa, located in present-day Arkansas City, Kansas, near the Arkansas River, that flourished between 1450 and 1700.

=== 16th century ===
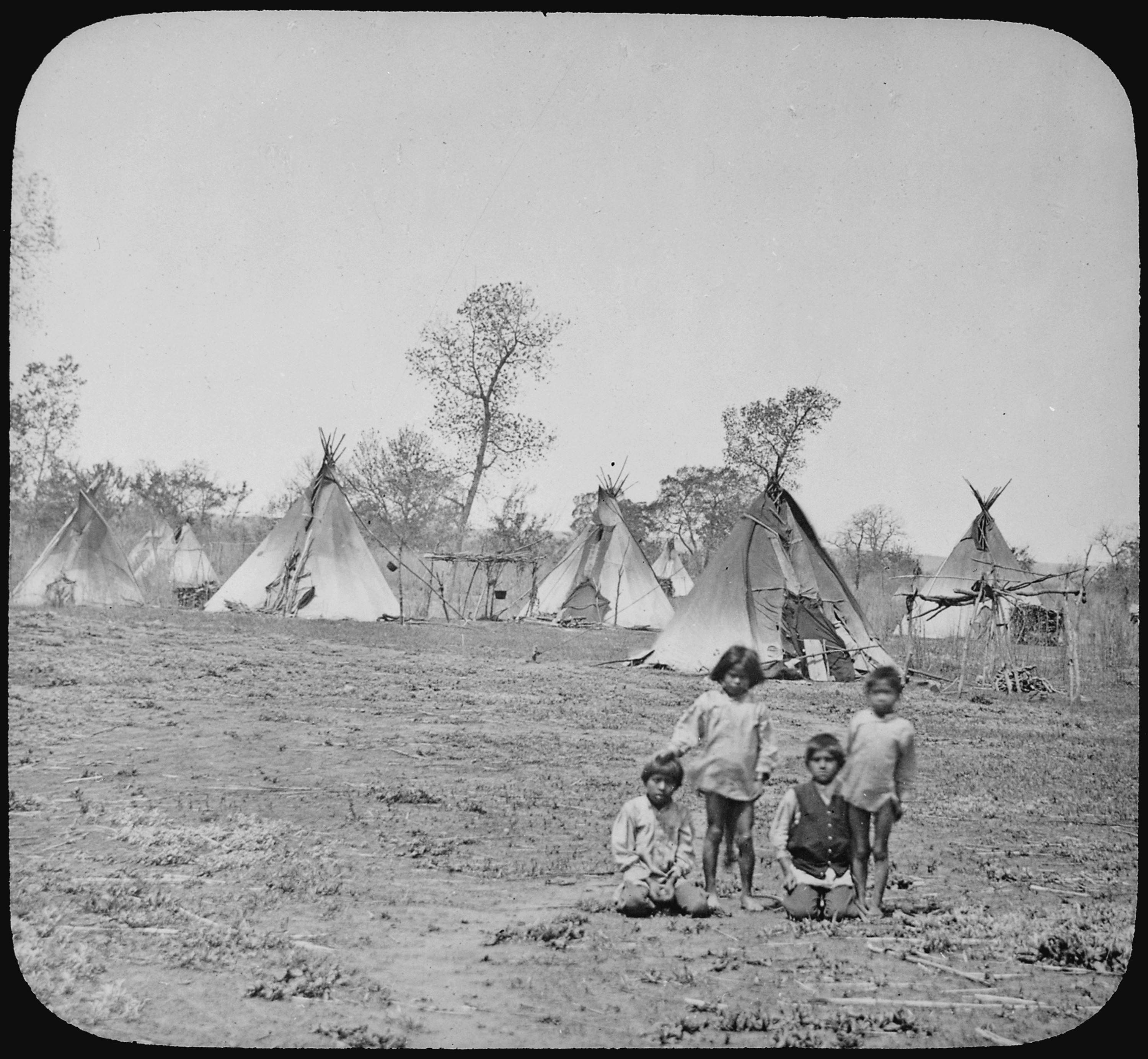
Wichita camp, 1904

In 1541 Spanish explorer Francisco Vásquez de Coronado journeyed east from the Rio Grande Valley in search of a rich land called Quivira. In Texas, probably in the Blanco River Canyon near Lubbock, Coronado met people he called Teyas who might have been related to the Wichita and the earlier Plains villagers. The Teyas, if in fact they were Wichita, were probably the ancestors of the Iscani and Waco, although they might also have been the Kichai, who spoke a different language but later joined the Wichita tribe. Turning north, he found Quivira and the people later known as the Wichita near the town of Lyons, Kansas. He was disappointed in his search for gold as the Quivirans appear to have been prosperous farmers and good hunters but had no gold or silver. There were about 25 villages of up to 200 houses each in Quivira. Coronado said: "They were large people of very good build", and he was impressed with the land, which was "fat and black." Though Coronado was impressed with Wichita society, he often treated the Wichita poorly in his expedition. Even after Wichita migration, some settlements were thought to have remained in northern Quivira in 1680.

It was also noted: "They eat meat raw/jerky like the Querechos [the Apache] and Teyas. They are enemies of one another...These people of Quivira have the advantage over the others in their houses and in growing of maize".

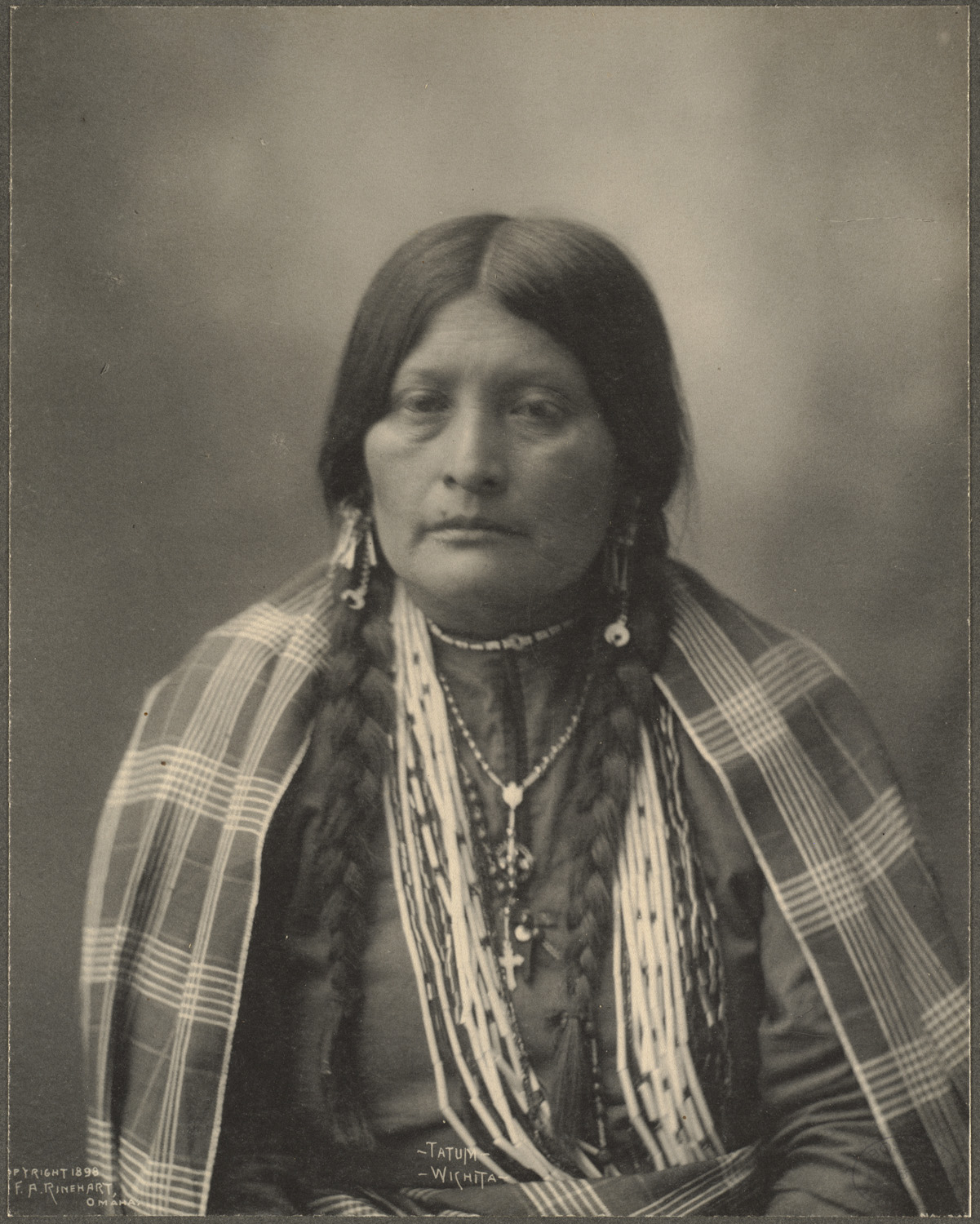
Tatum, a Wichita woman, 1898

The Quivirans apparently called their land Tancoa (which bears a resemblance to the later sub-tribe called Tawakoni) and a neighboring province on the Smoky Hill River was called Tabas (which bears a resemblance to the sub-tribe of Taovayas). Settlements existed here until the Wichita were driven away in the 18th century.

=== 17th century ===
In 1601, 60 years after Coronado's expedition the founder of New Mexico Juan de Oñate visited Etzanoa, the Wichita city. Oñate journeyed east from New Mexico, crossing the Great Plains and encountering two large settlements of people he called Escanjaques (possibly Yscani) and Rayados, most certainly Wichita. The Rayado city was probably on the Walnut River near Arkansas City, Kansas. Oñate described the city as containing "more than twelve hundred houses" which would indicate a population of about 12,000. His description of the Etzanoa was similar to that of Coronado's description of Quivira. The homesteads were dispersed; the houses round, thatched with grass and surrounded by large granaries to store the corn, beans, and squash they grew in their fields. Oñate's Rayados were certainly Wichita, probably the sub-tribe later known as the Guichitas.

What the Coronado and Oñate expeditions showed was that the Wichita people of the 16th century were numerous and widespread. They were not, however, a single tribe at this time but rather a group of several related tribes speaking a common language. The dispersed nature of their villages probably indicated that they were not seriously threatened by attack by enemies, although that would change as they would soon be squeezed between the Apache on the West and the powerful Osage on the East. European diseases would also probably be responsible for a large decline in the Wichita population in the 17th century.

=== 18th century ===
In 1719, French explorers visited two groups of Wichita. Bernard de la Harpe found a large village near present-day Tulsa, Oklahoma and Claude Charles Du Tisne found two villages near Neodesha, Kansas. Regarding religion, La Harpe noticed that the Wichita people "had little of it". He did, however, gain knowledge on the presence of a Great Spirit that the Wichita worshipped. Coronado's Quivira was abandoned early in the 18th century, probably due to Apache attacks. The Rayados of Oñate were probably still living in about the same Walnut River location. Archaeologists have located a Wichita village at the Deer Creek Site dating from the 1750s on the Arkansas River east of Newkirk, Oklahoma. By 1757, however, it appears that all the Wichita had migrated south to the Red River.

The most prominent of the Wichita sub-tribes were the Taovayas. In the 1720s they had moved south from Kansas to the Red River establishing a large village on the north side of the River at Petersburg, Oklahoma and on the south side at Spanish Fort, Texas. They adopted many traits of the nomadic Plains Indians and were noted for raiding, trading. They had a close alliance with the French, and in 1746 a French brokered alliance with the Comanche revived the fortunes of the Wichita. The village at Petersburg was "a lively emporium where Comanches brought Apache slaves, horses and mules to trade for French packs of powder, balls, knives, and textiles and for Taovaya-grown maize, melons, pumpkins, squash, and tobacco."

The Wichita and their Comanche allies were known to the Spanish as the Norteños (Northerners). The Wichita people and the Comanche attacked a Spanish military expedition in 1759. Afterwards, in response to the destruction by the Norteños of the San Saba Mission the Spanish and their Apache allies undertook an expedition to punish the Indians. Their 500-man army attacked the twin villages on Red River, but was defeated by the Wichita and Comanche in the Battle of the Twin Villages. The Spanish army suffered 19 dead and 14 wounded, leaving two cannons on the battlefield, although they claimed to have killed more than 100 Indians.

The alliance between the Wichita, especially the Taovayas, and the Comanche began to break up in the 1770s as the Wichita sought a better relationship with the Spanish. Taovaya power in Texas declined sharply after an epidemic, probably smallpox, in 1777 and 1778 killed about one-third of the tribe. After the United States took over their territory as a result of the Louisiana Purchase in 1803 and the independence of Texas in 1836, all the related tribes were increasingly lumped together and dubbed "Wichita". That designation also included the Kichai of northern Texas, who spoke a different although a related language.

== 19th century ==
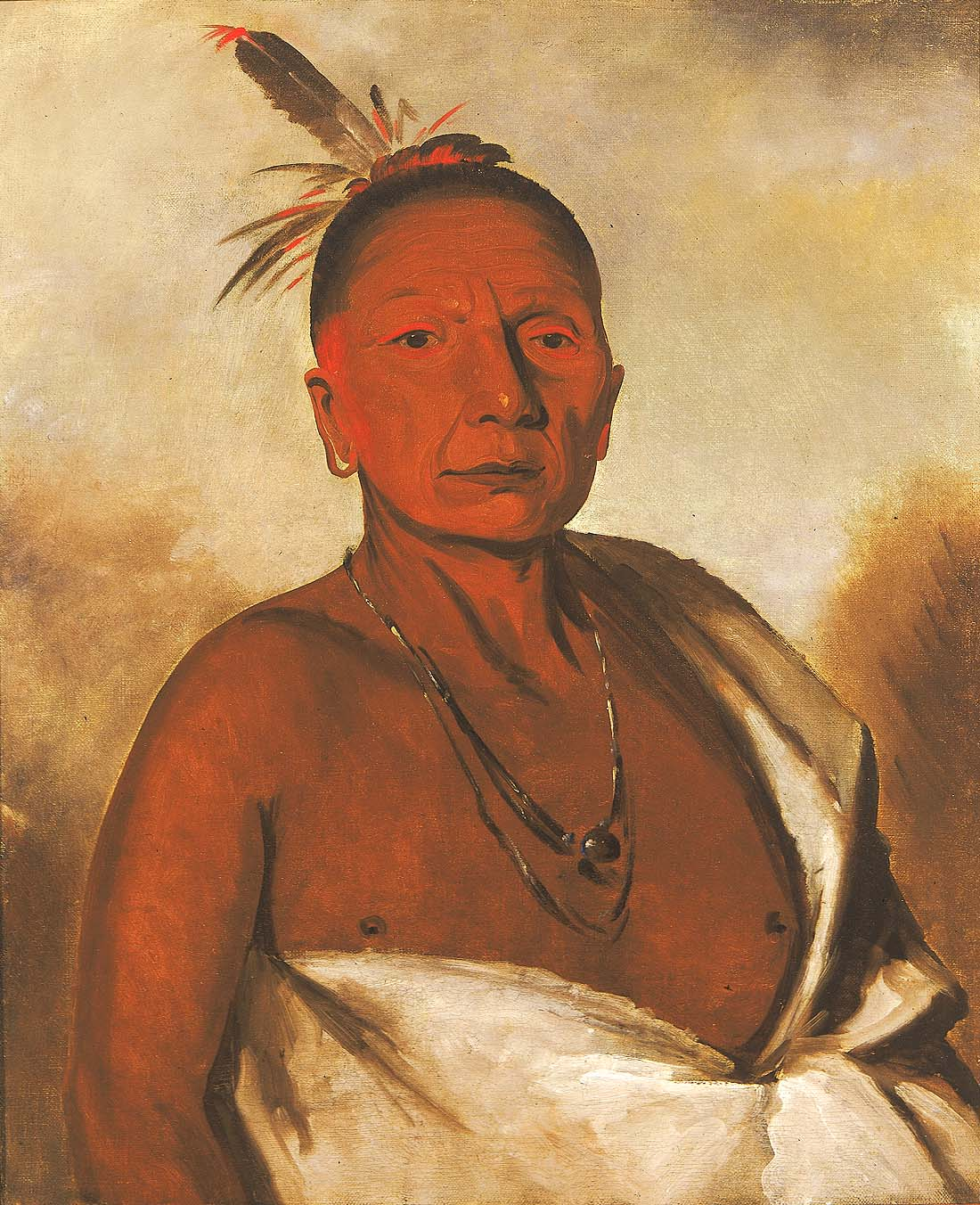
Portrait of Kid-á-day (1834) by George Catlin

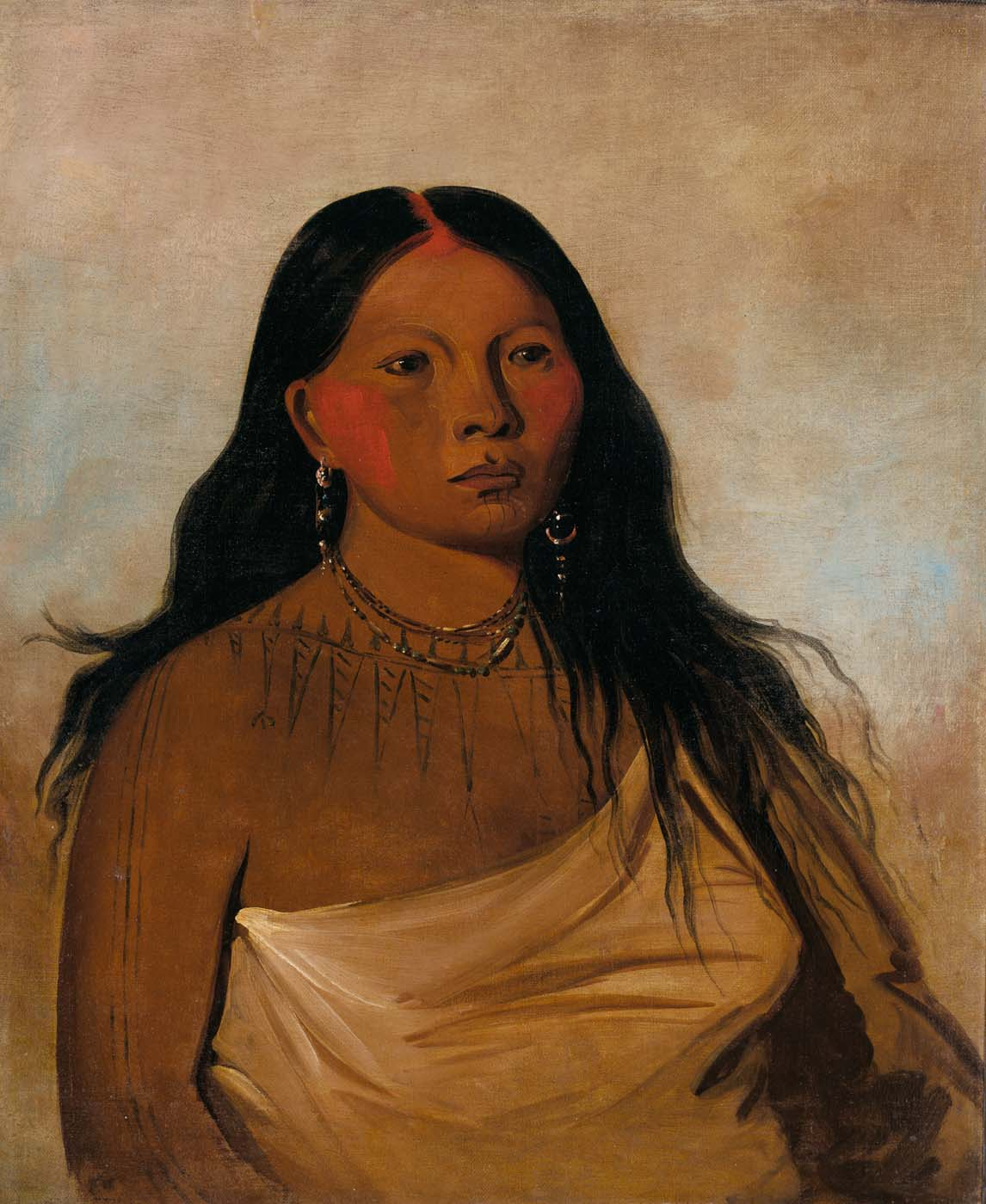
Portrait of Káh-kée-tsee (1834) by George Catlin

The principal village of the Wichita in the 1830s was near the Wichita Mountains of Oklahoma. The Tonkawa and Wacos still lived in Texas. In 1855, the United States forced them onto the Brazos Indian Reservation south of Fort Belnap. White settlers attached the reservation in 1859. The tribes were forced out of Texas to a reservation in Indian Territory in 1859. During the Civil War, the Wichita allied with the Union side. They moved to Kansas, where they established a village at the site of present-day Wichita, Kansas. In 1867 they were relocated to a reservation in southwest Indian Territory (present-day Oklahoma) in the area where most of them continue to reside today. On June 4, 1891, the affiliated tribes signed an agreement with the Cherokee Commission for individual allotments.

== Relationships with other Indigenous tribes ==
Wichita relationships are mostly harmonious and cooperative. They traded with the Comanche and Caddo Confederacy. The Wichita were allies with the Comanche. However, they were enemies with groups such as the Pawnee, the Missouri, and the Apache. The Apache were the Wichita's worst enemies, having driven them out of their homes before contact with Europeans.

The Osage people invaded Wichita lands. Their relations is said to have been "cautiously hostile", but many Osage groups attacked them in the 18th century, eventually driving them out of the Arkansas River Basin.

=== Trade ===
Wichitas tribes traded with Pueblos to the west and Caddo Confederacy tribes to the east since precontact times. The Spanish traded with the Wichitas for agricultural products. The French traded with the Wichita primarily for their horses during the 16th century. The Wichita sensed that trading with the French would be ideal. Their migration in 1714 was partly motivated by their desire to move closer to European traders.

The Wichita first gained their European commodities in the mid-18th century, inspiring them to maintain close ties with the French in the 19th century. French traders were eager to exchange their goods with Wichita settlements as they traveled from Louisiana to Santa Fe.

== Population ==
The Wichita had a large population in the time of Coronado and Oñate. One scholar estimates their numbers at 200,000. Villages often contained around 1,000 to 1,250 people per village. Certainly they numbered in the tens of thousands. They appeared to be much reduced by the time of the first French contacts with them in 1719, probably due in large part to epidemics of infectious disease to which they had no immunity. In 1790, it was estimated there were about 3,200 total Wichita. Conflict with Texans in the early 19th century and Americans in the mid 19th century led to a major decline in population, leading to the eventual merging of Wichita settlements. By 1868, the population was recorded as being 572 total Wichita. By the time of the census of 1937, there were only 100 Wichita officially left.

In 2018, 2,953 people were enrolled in the Wichita and Affiliated Tribes. In 2011, there were 2,501 enrolled Wichitas, 1,884 of whom lived in the state of Oklahoma. Enrollment in the tribe required a minimum blood quantum of 1/32, as of 2017.

== Notable Wichita ==
- Big Eyes (c. 1520–after 1542), enslaved person, guide for Coronado expedition
- Doris McLemore (1927–2016), last first-language speaker of Wichita
- Cara Jade Myers, actress

== See also ==
- Apache
- Caddo
- Comanche
- Kichai people
- Lipan Apache people
- Taovaya people
- Tawakoni
- Waco people
