= Walnut River (Kansas) =

River in Kansas, United States

Walnut River Little Verdigris River
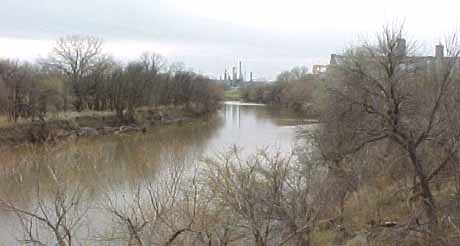
- The Walnut River near Arkansas City, Kansas

Location
- Country: United States
- State: Kansas
- Cities: Arkansas City, Winfield, El Dorado

Physical characteristics
- Source
  - location: Near Cassoday, Kansas, United States
  - coordinates: 38°01′17″N 096°33′12″W
  - elevation: 1,473 ft (449 m)
- Mouth: Arkansas River
  - location: Near Arkansas City, Kansas, United States
  - coordinates: 37°02′57″N 097°00′02″W
  - elevation: 1,043 ft (318 m)
- Length: 154 mi (248 km), North-South

Basin features
- River system: Arkansas River watershed

The Walnut River is a tributary of the Arkansas River, 154 miles (248 km) long, in the Flint Hills region of Kansas in the United States. Via the Arkansas, it is part of the Mississippi River watershed.

According to the GNIS, the river has also been known in the past as the "Little Verdigris River".

== Course ==
The Walnut River rises in northern Butler County and flows generally southward through Butler and Cowley Counties, past the towns of El Dorado, Augusta, Winfield and Douglass. It joins the Arkansas River at Arkansas City. The Walnut's principal tributaries are the Whitewater River, which joins it at Augusta, and the Little Walnut River, which joins it in southern Butler County. The Walnut River drainage basin comprises 2,380 square miles (6,200 km^{2}) in an ecoregion characterized by rocky, rolling hills and prairie. Elevations range from 1,050 to 1,625 feet (320 to 495 m) in the basin. Average precipitation, mostly summer rainfall, varies from 32 to 38 inches (810 to 970 mm) annually. Tallgrass prairie is the most common vegetation, covering 66 percent of the land. Crop land covers 23 percent and woodlands cover five percent. Major crops are wheat, soybeans, cotton, hay, sorgum, and corn. Cattle are the most important livestock.

Upstream of El Dorado, a U.S. Army Corps of Engineers dam causes the river to form El Dorado Lake, along which a Kansas state park has been designated. The lake consists of about 8,000 acres (3,200 ha) of water with another 8,000 acres of land along its shores designated as park and wildlife areas. The other large lake in the Walnut River basin is Winfield City Lake with 1,250 acres (510 ha) of water surrounded by 1,150 acres (470 ha) of parkland. Both lakes offer recreational opportunities including fishing, boating, hunting, camping, and wildlife observation.

In Winfield, the east side of the old Tunnel Mill Dam is a public fishing spot. It is staged directly near the old Kickapoo Corral. The west side of the dam and the Kickapoo Corral are both privately owned and closed to the public. A whirlpool is created by a hole in solid limestone about 15 feet (4.6 m) down on the river bed directly off the cliffs of the Corral. The bottom is sandy and somewhat rocky.

== Historical sites ==
Near the mouth of the Walnut River, in eastern Arkansas City, are a large number of archaeological sites, including the historical city of Etzanoa, a Wichita settlement that flourished between 1450 and 1700 and housed perhaps 20,000 people. This site was visited in 1601 by New Mexico governor Juan de Oñate.

== Festival ==
The Walnut Valley Festival is held along the banks in Winfield.

== See also ==
- List of Kansas rivers

== Sources ==
- Columbia Gazetteer of North America entry
- DeLorme (2003). Kansas Atlas & Gazetteer. Yarmouth, Maine: DeLorme. ISBN 0-89933-342-7.
