= Indian bread root =

Indian bread root is a common name for several plants with edible roots and may refer to:

- Pediomelum esculentum, syn. Psoralea esculenta, a legume native to the Great Plains
- Zamia integrifolia, a cycad native to the southeastern United States and the Caribbean
