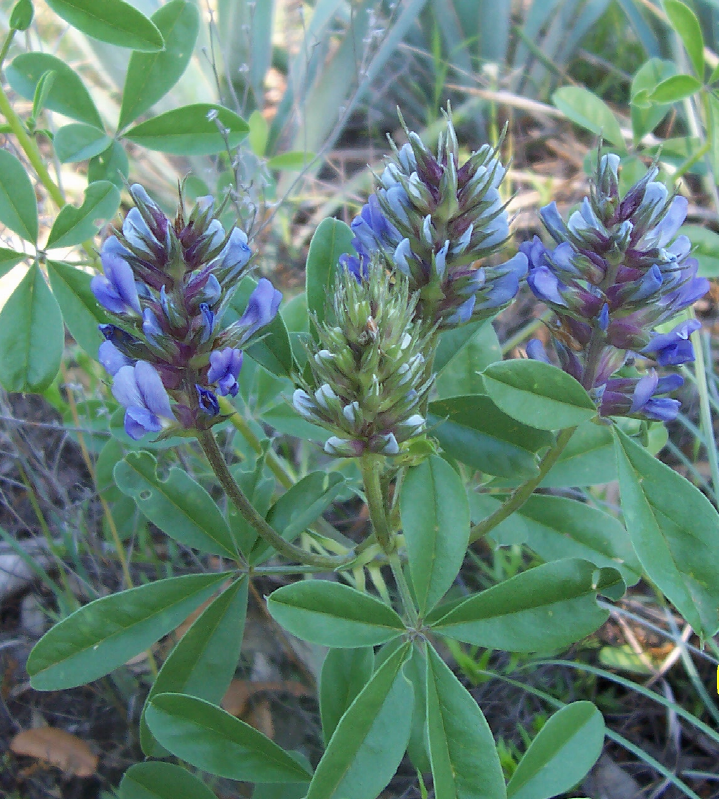

Conservation status
- Apparently Secure (NatureServe)

Scientific classification
- Kingdom: Plantae
- Clade: Tracheophytes
- Clade: Angiosperms
- Clade: Eudicots
- Clade: Rosids
- Order: Fabales
- Family: Fabaceae
- Subfamily: Faboideae
- Genus: Pediomelum
- Species: P. cuspidatum

Binomial name
- Pediomelum cuspidatum (Pursh) Rydb.

Synonyms
- List: Lotodes cuspidatum (Pursh) Kuntze (1891); Pediomelum caudatum Rydb. (1919); Pediomelum parksii Tharp & F.A.Barkley (1945); Psoralea caudata (Rydb.) Cory (1936); Psoralea cryptocarpa Torr. & A.Gray (1838); Psoralea cuspidata Pursh (1813); Psoralea macrorhiza Fraser ex Pursh (1813); Psoralea roemeriana Scheele (1848)

= Pediomelum cuspidatum =

Plant species in the pea family

Pediomelum cuspidatum (also known as Psoralea cuspidata) is a perennial herb also known as the buffalo pea, largebract Indian breadroot and the tall-bread scurf-pea. It is found on the black soil prairies in Texas. It has an inflorescence on stems 18-40 centimeters long arising from a subterranean stem and deep carrot-shaped root that is 4–15 cm long. The long petioled leaves are palmately divided into 5 linear-elliptic leaflets that are 2-4 centimeters long. The flowers, borne in condensed spikes from the leaves, are light blue and pea-like.

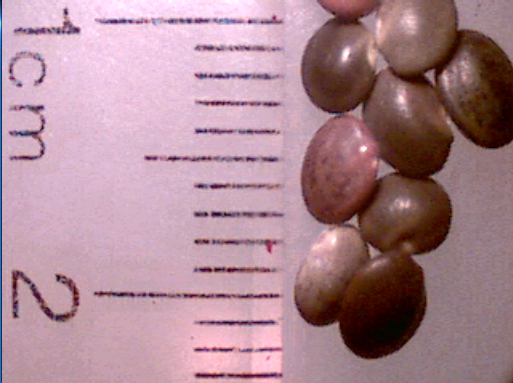
Pediomelum cuspidatum seed

== Cultivation and uses ==
Pediomelum cuspidata emerges in late Spring, and sets few seeds, unlike its smaller, fecund cousin Pediomelum hypogaeum. The species has edible tuberous roots, although some sources describe it as 'bitter'.
