= Prehistoric agriculture on the Great Plains =

Agriculture of indigenous peoples on a North American flatland

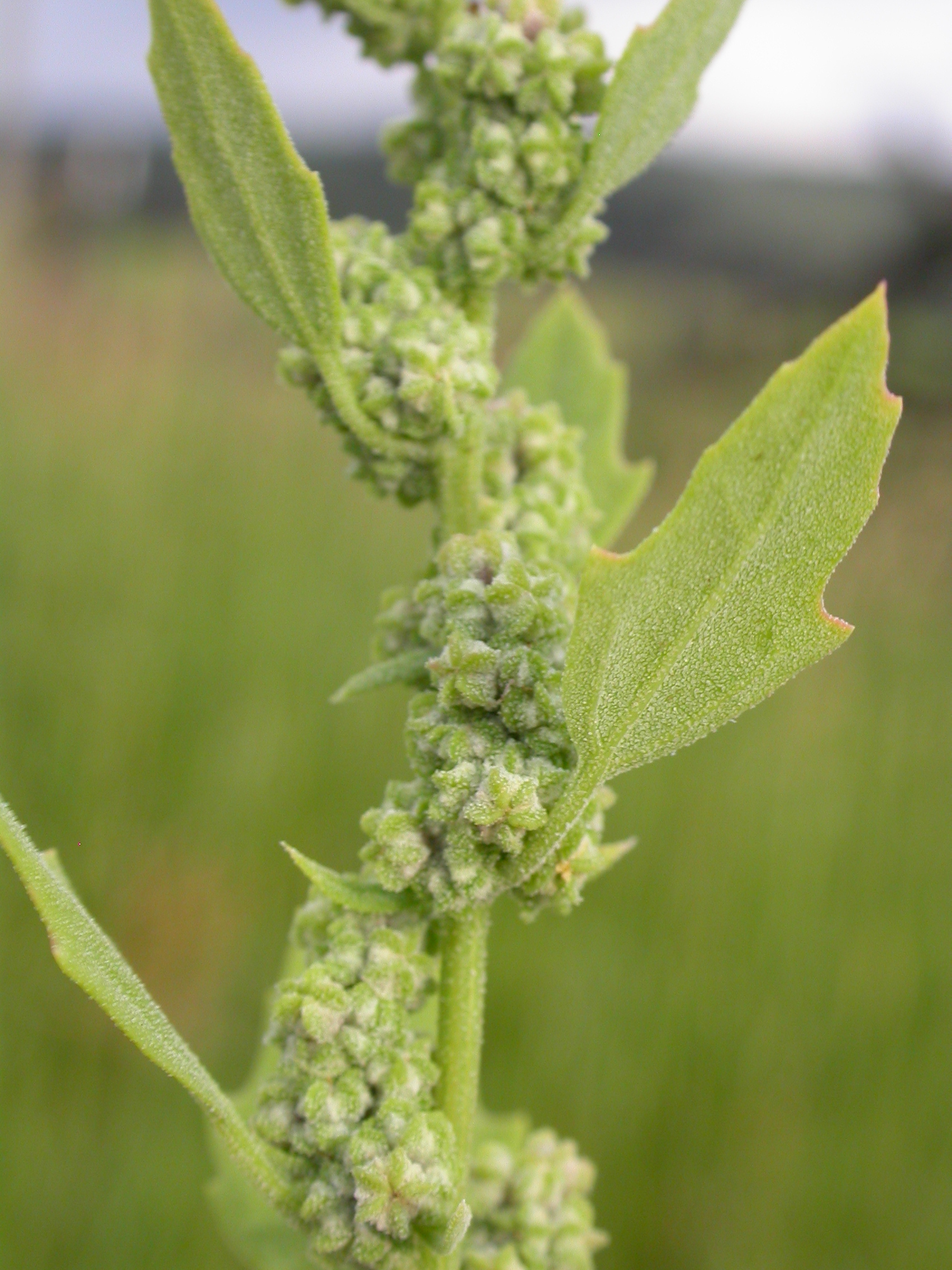
Chenopodium berlandieri or goosefoot, Bozeman, Montana

Agriculture on the precontact Great Plains describes the agriculture of the Indigenous peoples of the Great Plains of the United States and southern Canada in the Pre-Columbian era and before extensive contact with European explorers, which in most areas occurred by 1750. The most important crop was maize, usually planted along with beans and squash, including pumpkins. Minor crops such as sunflowers, goosefoot, tobacco, gourds, and plums, little barley (Hordeum pusillum) and marsh elder (Iva annua) were also grown. Maize agriculture began on the Great Plains about 900 AD.

Evidence of agriculture is found in all Central Plains complexes. Tribes periodically switched from emphasis on farming to hunting throughout their history during the Plains Village period (950-1850 AD), probably based on climatic fluctuations and the periodic abundance of bison. The northernmost area of intensive maize cultivation on the Great Plains was along the Missouri River in North Dakota, although there is evidence of maize cultivation in neighboring Manitoba. The southernmost area of agriculture was in northern Texas among the Caddoan peoples. The farming Natives traded their surplus production to non-agricultural nomads.

== Environment ==
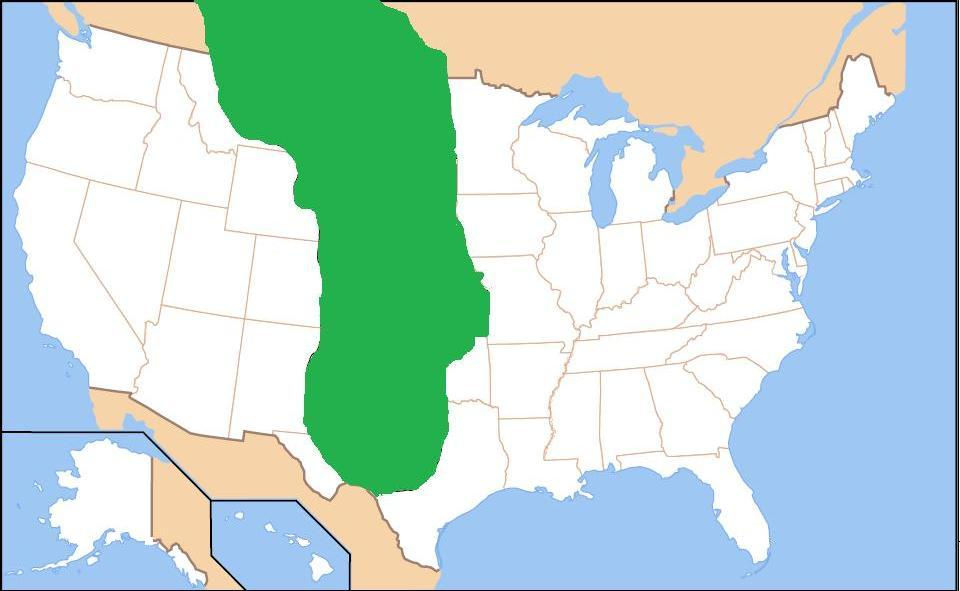
A map showing the location of the Great Plains

The primary constraint on agriculture on the Great Plains is that precipitation is often deficient for growing maize, the primary crop of Indigenous farmers. In addition, on the northern Great Plains the growing season is short. Agriculture on the Plains seems to have had an ebb and flow, advancing westward into the drier areas in favorable wet periods and retreating in drier periods. The periodic abundance or scarcity of bison was also a factor in human settlements on the plains. The animal was an important food resource for Plains people, as well as providing skins for clothing and shelters.

== Precontact ==
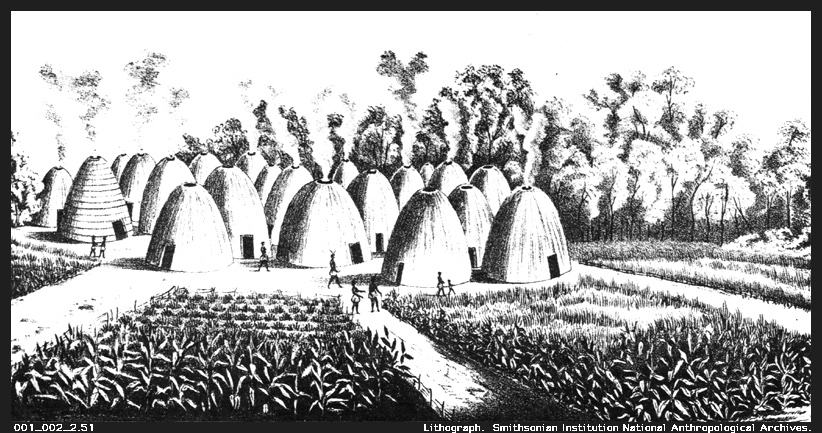
A Wichita village surrounded by fields of maize and other crops

Gathering wild plants, such as the prairie turnip (Pediomelum esculentum, syn. Psoralea esculenta) and chokecherry (Prunus virginiana) for food was a practice of Indian societies on the Great Plains since their earliest habitation 13,000 or more years ago. Over time Plains people learned to grow or facilitate the growth of native plants useful as food. Many native plants cultivated by Indians in the Eastern Agricultural Complex were also cultivated on the Great Plains.

Squash and beans were cultivated in what is now the United States, independent of Mesoamerica. Maize is a tropical crop first cultivated in Mexico several thousand years ago, which found its way northward to what is now the United States more than one thousand years ago. Maize agriculture began on the Great Plains by AD 900, initiating the Southern Plains villagers period of western Oklahoma and Texas. It probably came about as an extension westward and northward of the Caddoan cultures of eastern Texas. The Plains Village culture consisted of hamlets and semi-permanent villages along major rivers such as the Red, Washita, and Canadian. Subsistence was a combination of agriculture and hunting. A drying climatic trend beginning AD 1000 or 1100 may have tipped the subsistence scale more toward hunting and less toward a dependence upon agriculture. The Antelope Creek Phase of Plains villagers, dated from AD 1200 to 1450 in the Texas panhandle was influenced by the Southwestern Pueblo people of the Rio Grande valley in New Mexico. The contemporaneous Apishapa culture of southeastern Colorado depended mostly upon hunting. The historic descendants of the Southern Plains villagers are possibly the Wichita and Pawnee Indians.

The earliest known dates for maize agriculture on the northern Great Plains are from AD 1000 to 1200. The Missouri River Valley in present-day North Dakota was probably the northern limit of large-scale pre-historic maize cultivation on the Great Plains. Archaeologists have found evidence of prehistoric maize cultivation on the Great Plains north of the border of the United States and Canada. The most northerly site is near the town of Lockport, Manitoba, north of Winnipeg. The maize grown there was Northern Flint, the hardiest variety of maize. The inhabitants at Lockport carefully chose farming sites near water with sandy soils where the frost free period was slightly longer than average for the region.

The principal known Indian peoples who farmed extensively on the Great Plains when first discovered by European explorers were, from south to north, Caddoans in the Red River drainage, Wichita people along the Arkansas River, Pawnee in the Kansas River and Platte River drainages, and the Arikara, Mandan, and Hidatsa along the Missouri River in the Dakotas. Other peoples migrated or were pushed westward onto the Great Plains in late prehistoric or proto-historic times. Some of them, such as the Sioux and Cheyenne, gave up agriculture to become nomadic; other such as the Dhegiha (the Osage, Kaw, Omaha, and Ponca) and the Chiwere (Otoe, Iowa, and Missouria) continued to farm while also hunting buffalo for a major part of their livelihood.

Archaeologists have found evidence of agriculture practiced by Apache people (the Dismal River culture) living on the Great Plains in western Kansas and Nebraska in the 17th century. The semi-nomadic Apache were pushed southward and off the Great Plains by the fully nomadic Comanche in the 18th century.

== Cultivation and yields ==
Lacking iron tools and draft animals the prehistoric native farmer on the Great Plains primarily cleared and cultivated wooded land along rivers, especially the lighter soils on elevated river terraces which periodically flooded, renewing their fertility. They avoided cultivating the heavy soils of the open prairie with their deep mats of fibrous roots. Rather than being concentrated, the cultivated fields of the Great Plains farmer were dispersed along river terraces. Fields cultivated by the Pawnee were as much as eight miles from their villages.

The high productivity of maize enabled native farmers to produce large crops with simple tools on a small per capita amount of cultivated land—although farming on the drought-prone Great Plains was always a risky endeavor.

The amount of land needed by a farming household was between two and seven acres (0.8 and 2.8 ha) of cultivated land each year, the difference accounted for by the quality of the land. Fields were usually cultivated for two or three years and then fallowed. Fallowed acreage was two to three times that which was cultivated in a given year. Counting both cultivated and fallowed fields, a household needed 4 to 21 acres (1.6 to 8.5 ha) for subsistence. Households which depended more on hunting and gathering cultivated smaller amounts of land. Yields of maize plots on the Great Plains are estimated at 10-20 bushels (627 - 1,254 kg) per acre. Higher yields of up to 40 bushels (2,508 kg) per acre have been reported on newly cleared land. Land declined in fertility in subsequent crop years.

Among the Hidatsa, typical of Great Plains farmers, fields were cleared by burning which also fertilized the soil. The three implements used by native farmers were the digging stick, hoe, and rake. The digging stick was a sharpened and fire-hardened stick, three or more feet long, that was used to loosen soil, uproot weeds, and make planting holes. The hoe was made from a buffalo or elk shoulder blade bone, or scapula, lashed to a wooden handle. The rake was made from wood or an antler. Some native women preferred the bone hoe even after the iron hoe was introduced by European traders and settlers.

Sunflowers were the earliest crop planted in spring. Sunflowers were planted in clumps around the edges of fields. Maize was next planted. Native planting techniques are called Three Sisters agriculture. About five maize seeds were sown in a low mound of soil. The mounds were spaced about five feet apart. When the maize plants were a few inches high, climbing beans and squash seeds were planted between the mounds. The large squash leaves shaded the soil, preserving moisture and crowding out weeds. The beans fixed nitrogen in the soil and climbed up the corn stalks as support. The Wichita, and possibly other southern peoples, planted or tended thickets of low-growing Chickasaw plum trees separating and bordering their maize fields. Tobacco was planted in separate fields and tended by old men. Women did most of the other farming, although men assisted in clearing land.

Native farmers did not fertilize their fields with manure. As the soil declined in fertility with each crop year, unproductive fields were fallowed for two years and then replanted.

== Subsistence ==
Archaeologists have computed the subsistence of people in the Medicine Creek valley in Nebraska near the western limit of cultivation in pre-historic times. During the years 1000 to 1450 CE, the diet of the people of Medicine Creek depended upon game (mostly bison) for 30 percent of their subsistence, 30 percent from maize, 20 percent from other cultigens (squash, beans, and sunflowers), and 20 percent from wild plant resources. Further east where agriculture was more reliable due to greater precipitation, the percentage of cultivated crops in the diet may have been greater. The dependence on agriculture and hunting for subsistence varied due to climatic conditions as the Great Plains had periods of greater and lesser precipitation.

== Farming year ==
The Pawnee in Nebraska were among the best of the Plains Indian farmers and had elaborate rituals connected with the planting and harvesting of maize. In spring, they planted 10 varieties of maize, seven varieties of pumpkins and squashes, and eight varieties of beans. The maize included flour, flint, and sweet corn plus one ancient variety raised only for inclusion in the "sacred bundles" common among Plains Indians. The Indians were aware that the different varieties of maize could hybridize if grown in close proximity and planted different varieties in fields a substantial distance apart.

One of the rituals of the Pawnees during the spring planting season to ensure the fertility of the soil was the Morning Star ceremony and the ritual sacrifice of a young girl captured from an enemy tribe. The Morning Star sacrifice did not take place every year. The last human sacrifice by the Pawnee was in 1838.

Common to many other Plains farmers, the Pawnee left their villages in late June when their corn crop was about knee high to live in tipis and roam the plains on a summer buffalo hunt. They returned about the first of September to harvest their crops. Maize, beans, and pumpkins were dried, packed into rawhide bags, and stored in bell-shaped underground storage pits. The Pawnee followed the harvest with a month of celebrations and in early December departed their villages again for a winter hunt, their stored agricultural products hidden beneath in underground pits. This yearly cycle of life was common among the Plains farmers, especially after the acquisition of the horse in the late 17th and 18th century gave them the mobility to undertake lengthy hunts far from their permanent villages.

== Trade ==
Trade between the farming and the nomadic hunting Indians was important on the Great Plains. The Mandan and Hidatsa villages on the Missouri River in the Dakotas conducted a large trade with the non-agricultural hunting Indians. In fall 1737, the French explorer La Vérendrye found a group of Assiniboine planning to undertake their annual two-month-long, thousand-kilometer round trip south to the Mandan villages to trade bison meat for agricultural goods. Abundant evidence of similar long-distance trading between farmers and hunters occurred among other tribes of the Plains.

== Gallery ==
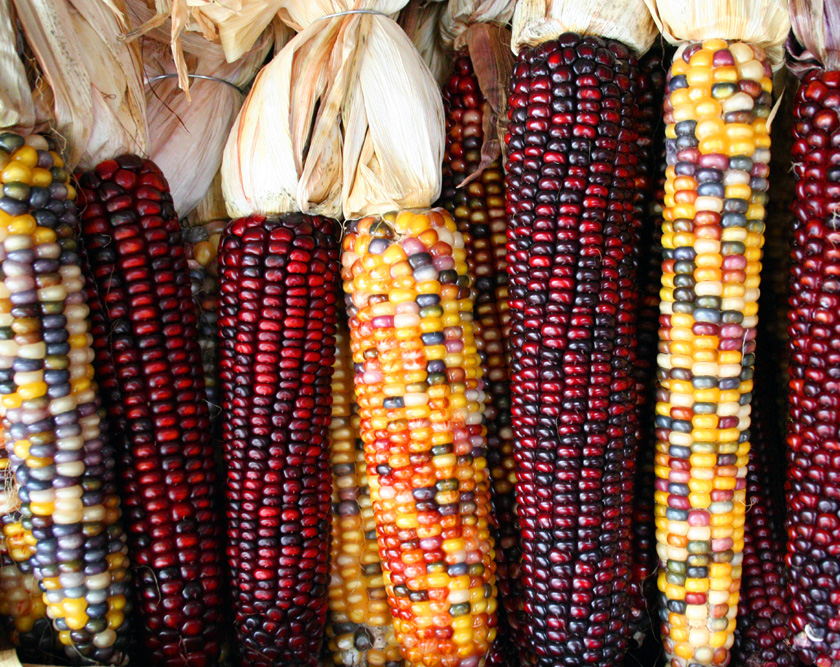
Maize

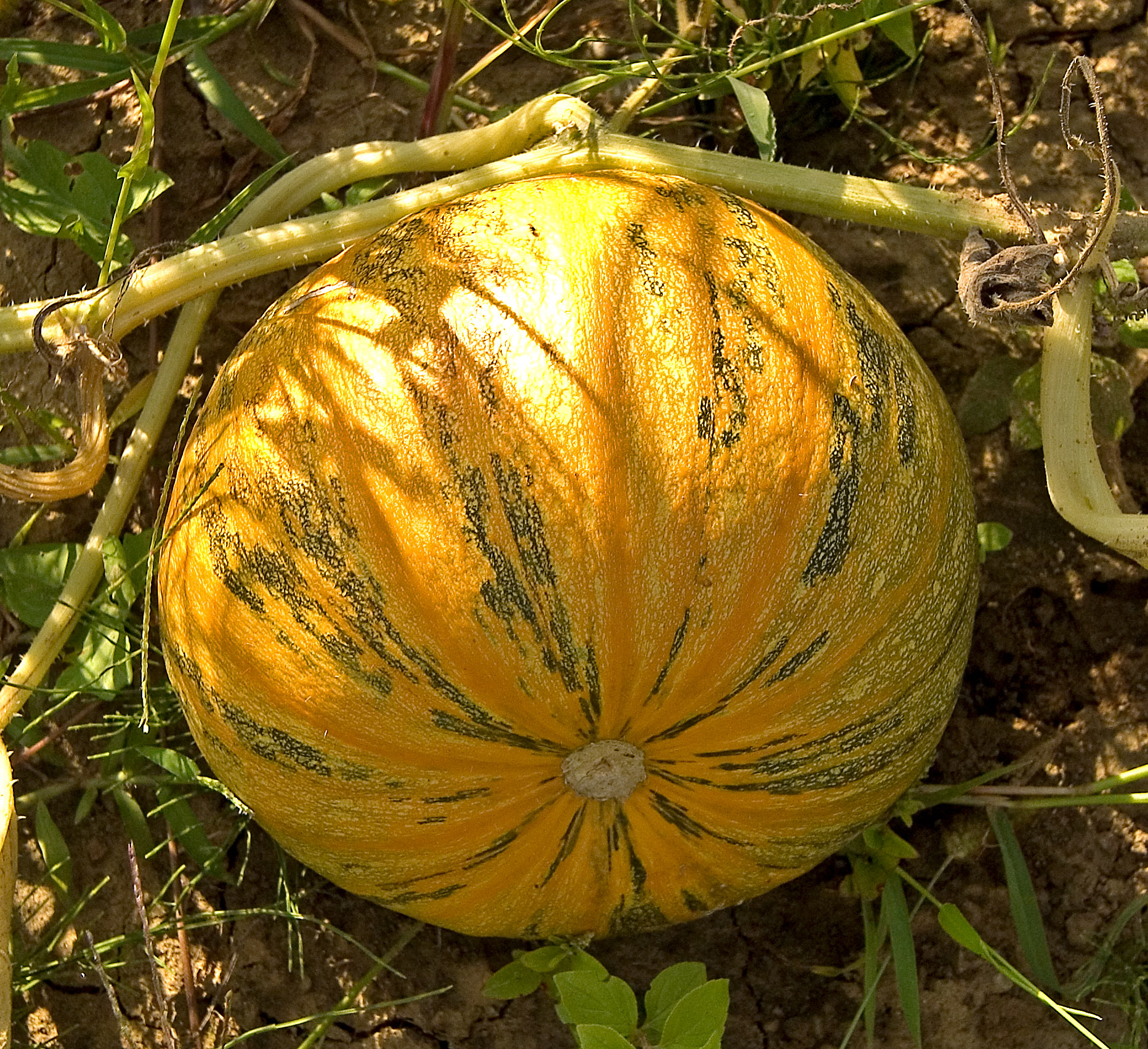
Squash

== See also ==
- History of agriculture in Canada
