= Plains Indians =

Native Americans/First Nations peoples of the Great Plains of North America

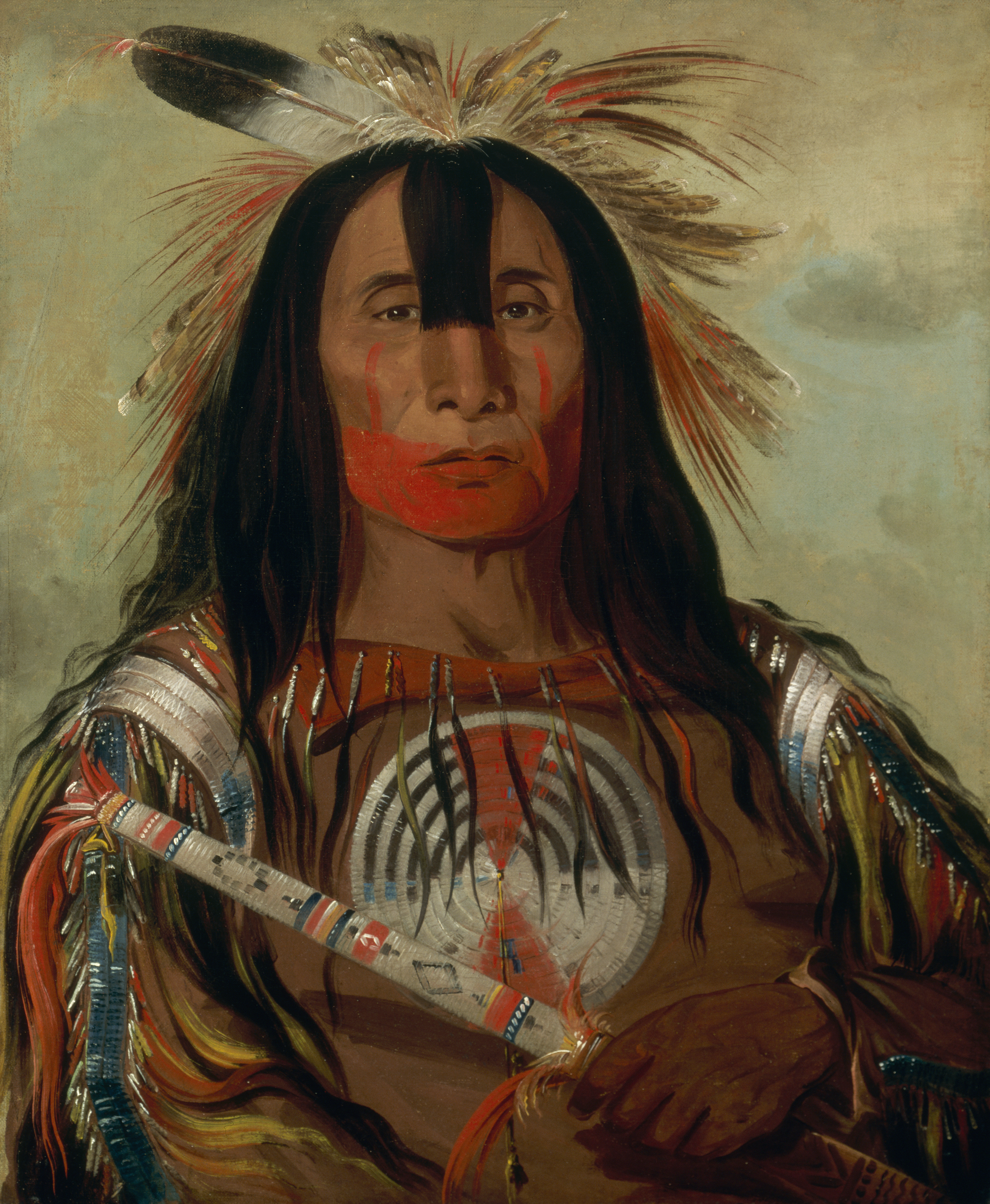
Stumickosúcks of the Kainai. George Catlin, 1832

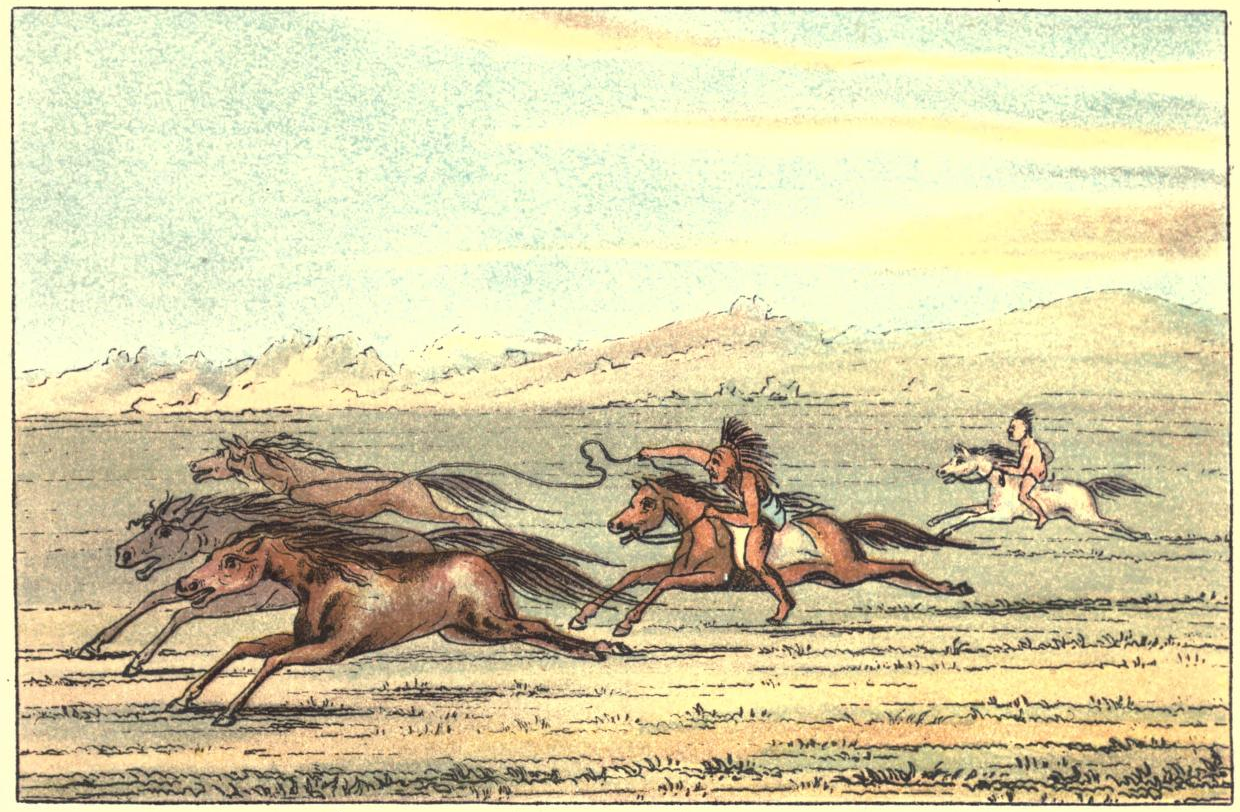
Comanches capturing wild horses with lassos, approximately July 16, 1834

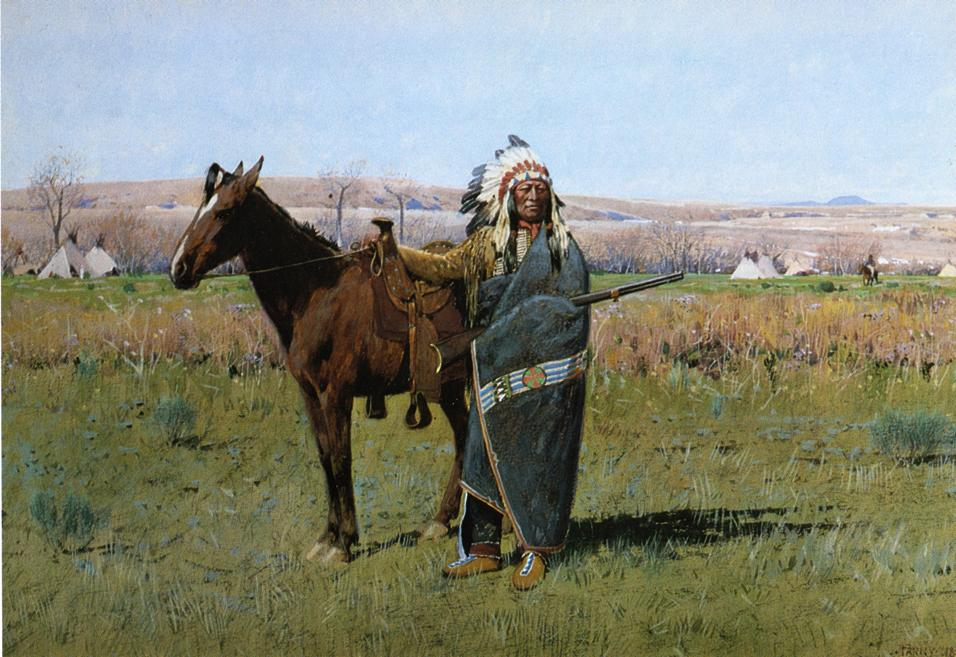
Spotted Tail of the Lakota Sioux

Plains Indians or Indigenous peoples of the Great Plains are the Native American tribes and First Nations peoples who have historically lived on the Interior Plains (the Great Plains) of North America. While hunting-farming cultures have lived on the Great Plains for centuries prior to European contact, the region is known for the horse cultures that flourished from the 17th century through the late 19th century. Their historic nomadism and armed resistance to domination by the government and military forces of Canada and the United States have made the Plains Indian culture groups an archetype in literature and art for Native Americans everywhere.

The Plains tribes are usually divided into two broad classifications which overlap to some degree. The first group became a fully nomadic horse culture during the 18th and 19th centuries, following the vast herds of American bison, although some tribes occasionally engaged in agriculture. These include the Arapaho, Assiniboine, Blackfoot, Cheyenne, Comanche, Crow, Gros Ventre, Kiowa, Lakota, Lipan, Plains Apache (or Kiowa Apache), Plains Cree, Plains Ojibwe, Sarsi, Nakoda (Stoney), and Tonkawa. The second group were sedentary and semi-sedentary, and, in addition to hunting bison, they lived in villages, raised crops, and actively traded with other tribes. These include the Arikara, Hidatsa, Iowa, Kaw (or Kansa), Kitsai, Mandan, Missouria, Omaha, Osage, Otoe, Pawnee, Ponca, Quapaw, Wichita, and the Santee Dakota, Yanktonai and Yankton Dakota.

== History ==
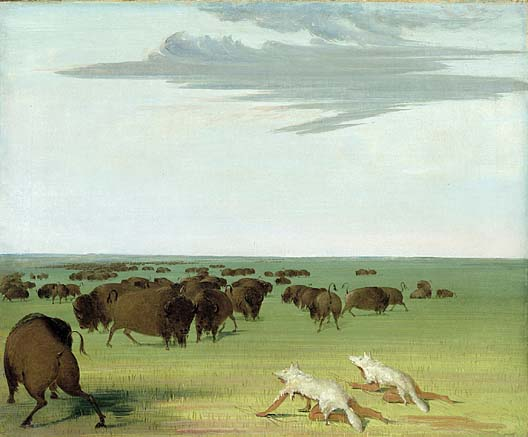
Bison hunt under the wolf-skin mask, George Catlin, c. 1832

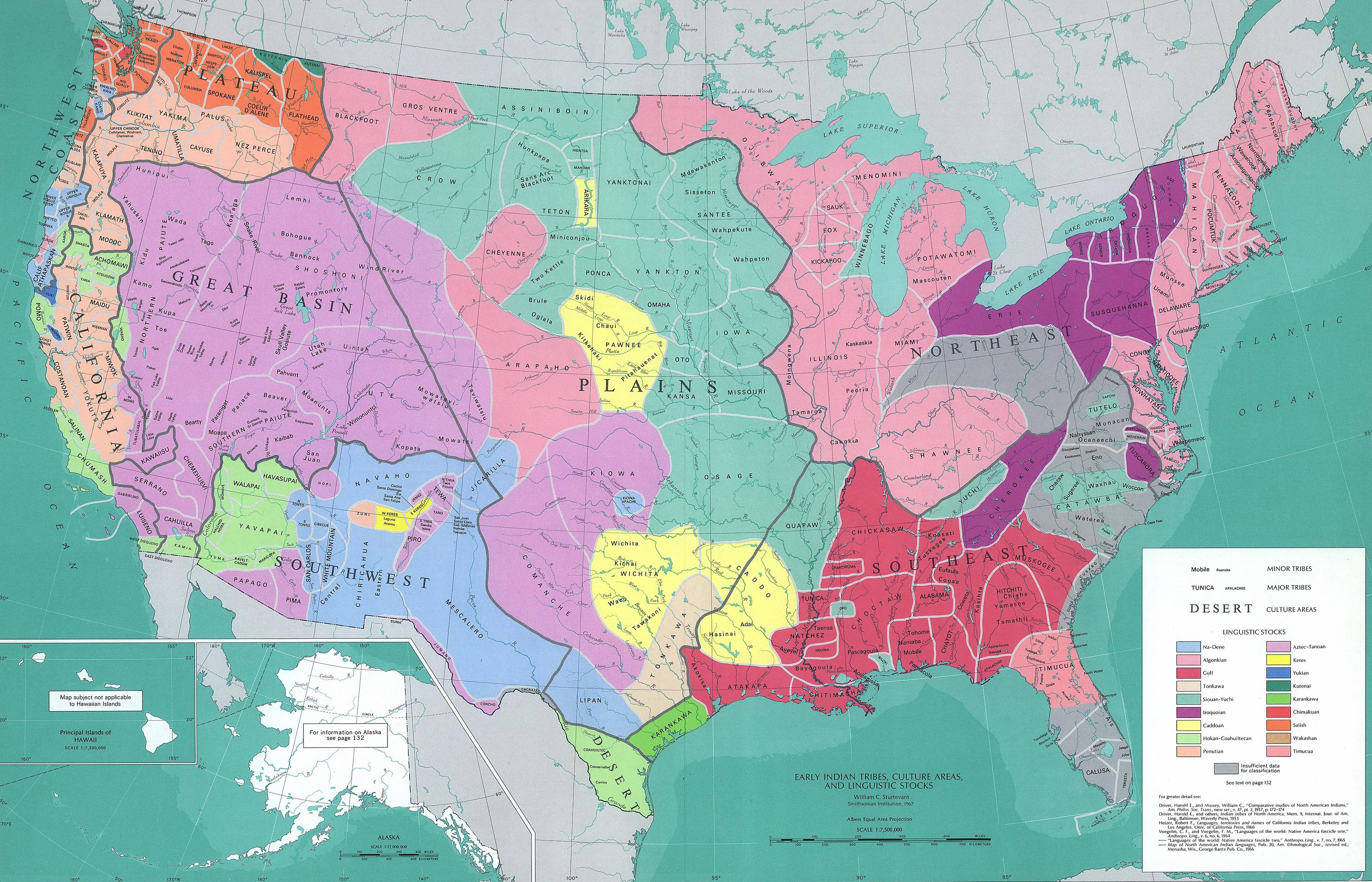
Early Native American tribal territories color-coded by linguistic group

The earliest people of the Great Plains mixed hunting and gathering wild plants. The cultures developed horticulture, then agriculture, as they settled in sedentary villages and towns. Maize, originally from Mesoamerica and spread north from the Southwest, became widespread in the south of the Great Plains around 700 CE.

Numerous Plains peoples hunted the American bison (or buffalo) to make items used in everyday life, such as food, cups, decorations, crafting tools, knives, and clothing. The tribes followed the seasonal grazing and migration of the bison. The Plains Indians lived in tipis because they were easily disassembled and allowed the nomadic life of following game.

The Spanish explorer Francisco Vásquez de Coronado was the first European to describe the Plains Indian culture. He encountered villages and cities of the Plains village cultures. While searching for a reputedly wealthy land called Quivira in 1541, Coronado came across the Querechos in the Texas panhandle. The Querechos were the people later called Apache. According to the Spaniards, the Querechos lived "in tents made of the tanned skins of the cows (bison). They dry the flesh in the sun, cutting it thin like a leaf, and when dry they grind it like meal to keep it and make a sort of sea soup of it to eat. ... They season it with fat, which they always try to secure when they kill a cow. They empty a large gut and fill it with blood, and carry this around the neck to drink when they are thirsty." Coronado described many common features of Plains Indians culture: skin tepees, travois pulled by dogs, Plains Indian Sign Language, and staple foods such as jerky and pemmican.

Siouan language speakers may have originated in the lower Mississippi River region. They were agriculturalists and may have been part of the Mound Builder civilization during the 9th–12th centuries. Wars with the Ojibwe and Cree peoples pushed the Lakota (Teton Sioux) west onto the Great Plains in the mid- to late 17th century. The Shoshone originated in the western Great Basin and spread north and east into present-day Idaho and Wyoming. By 1500, some Eastern Shoshone had crossed the Rocky Mountains into the Great Plains. After 1750, warfare and pressure from the Blackfoot, Crow, Lakota, Cheyenne, and Arapaho pushed Eastern Shoshone south and westward. Some of them migrated as far south as Texas, emerging as the Comanche by 1700.

European explorers and hunters (and later, settlers) brought diseases against which the Indians had no resistance. Between a half and two-thirds of the Plains Indians are thought to have died of smallpox by the time of the Louisiana Purchase. The 1837 Great Plains smallpox epidemic spread across the Great Plains, killing many thousands between 1837 and 1840. In the end, it is estimated that two-thirds of the Blackfoot population died, along with half of the Assiniboines and Arikaras, a third of the Crows, and a quarter of the Pawnees.

=== Horses ===
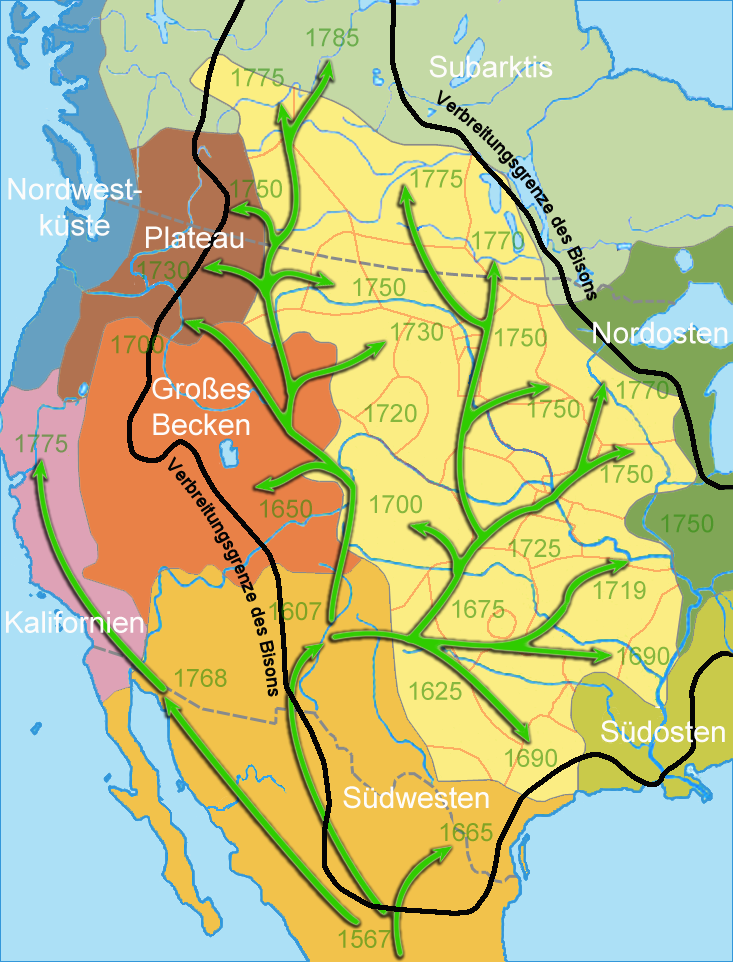
Spread of the horse. The black line defines the distribution of the bison.

The Plains Indians historically lived without horses, which went extinct in the Americas 15,000–13,000 years ago. However, the reintroduction of the horse in the 16th century had a profound impact on the culture of the Great Plains. When horses were obtained, the Plains tribes rapidly integrated them into their daily lives. People in the southwest began to acquire horses in the 16th century by trading or stealing them from Spanish colonists in New Mexico. As horse culture moved northward, the Comanche were among the first to commit to a fully mounted nomadic lifestyle. This occurred by the 1730s, when they had acquired enough horses to put all their people on horseback.

The horse enabled the Plains Indians to gain their subsistence with relative ease from the seemingly limitless bison herds. Riders were able to travel faster and farther in search of bison herds and to transport more goods, thus making it possible to enjoy a richer material environment than their pedestrian ancestors. For the Plains peoples, the horse became an item of prestige as well as utility. They were extravagantly fond of their horses and the lifestyle they permitted.

The first Spanish conqueror to bring horses to the new world was Hernán Cortés in 1519. However, Cortés only brought about sixteen horses with his expedition. Coronado brought 558 horses with him on his 1539–1542 expedition. At the time, the Indians of these regions had never seen a horse. Only two of Coronado's horses were mares, so he was highly unlikely to have been the source of the horses that Plains Indians later adopted as the cornerstone of their culture. In 1592, however, Juan de Oñate brought 7,000 head of livestock with him when he came north to establish a colony in New Mexico. His horse herd included mares as well as stallions.

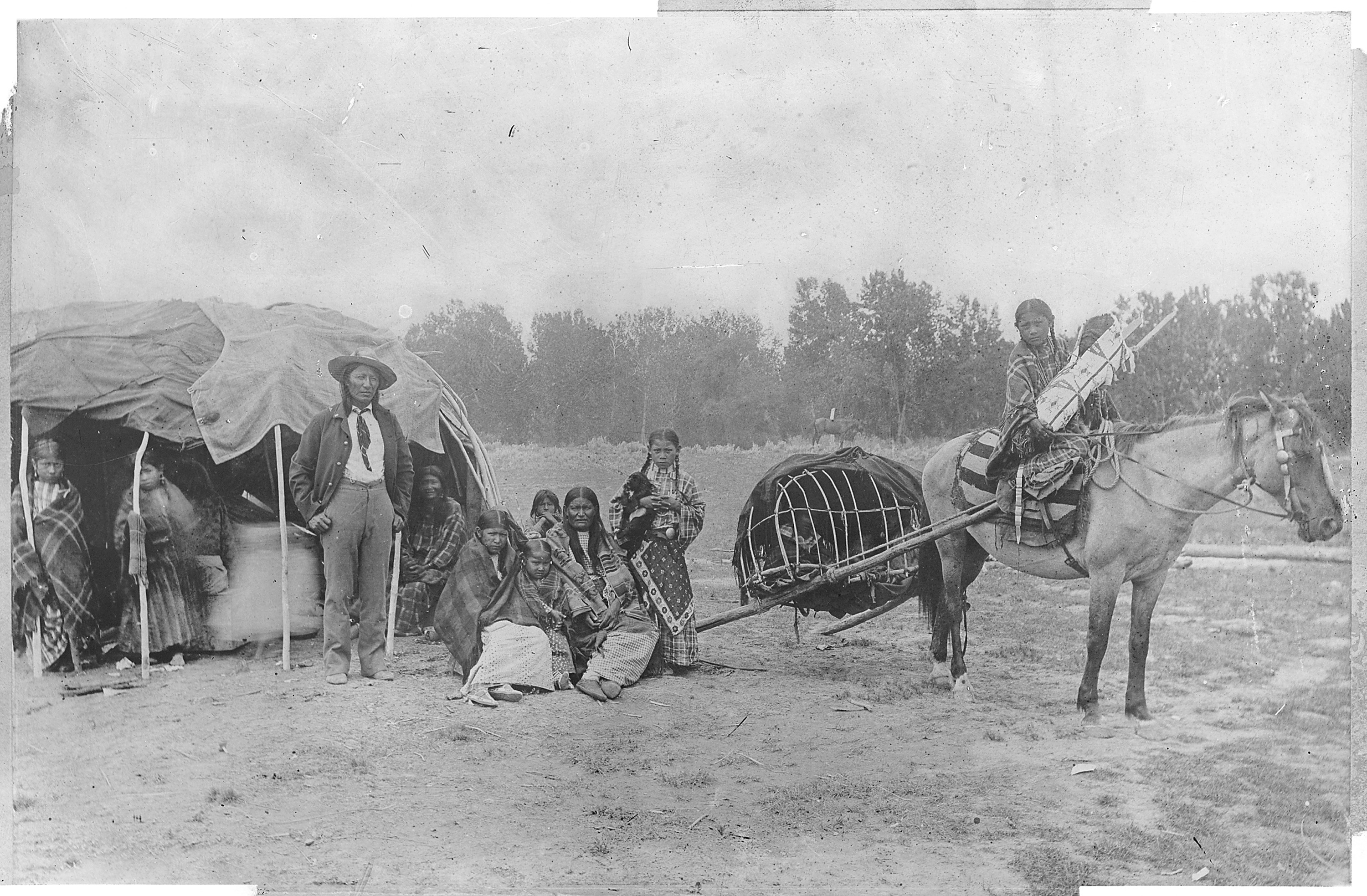
Stump Horn of the Cheyenne and his family with a horse and travois, c. 1871–1907

Pueblo Indians learned about horses by working for Spanish colonists. The Spanish attempted to keep knowledge of riding away from Native people, but nonetheless, they learned and some fled their servitude to their Spanish employers—and took horses with them. Some horses were obtained through trade in spite of prohibitions against it. Other horses escaped captivity for a feral existence and were captured by Native people. In all cases, the horse was adopted into their culture and herds multiplied. By 1659, the Navajo from northwestern New Mexico were raiding the Spanish colonies to steal horses. By 1664, the Apache were trading captives from other tribes to the Spanish for horses. The real beginning of the horse culture of the plains began with the Pueblo Revolt of 1680 in New Mexico and the capture of thousands of horses and other livestock. They traded many horses north to the Plains Indians. In 1683 a Spanish expedition into Texas found horses among Native people. In 1690, a few horses were found by the Spanish among the Indians living at the mouth of the Colorado River of Texas and the Caddo of eastern Texas had a sizeable number.

The French explorer Claude Charles Du Tisne found 300 horses among the Wichita on the Verdigris River in 1719, but they were still not plentiful. Another Frenchman, Bourgmont, could only buy seven at a high price from the Kaw in 1724, indicating that horses were still scarce among tribes in Kansas. While the distribution of horses proceeded slowly northward on the Great Plains, it moved more rapidly through the Rocky Mountains and the Great Basin. The Shoshone in Wyoming had horses by about 1700 and the Blackfoot people, the most northerly of the large Plains tribes, acquired horses in the 1730s. By 1770, Plains horse culture was established, consisting of mounted bison-hunting nomads from Saskatchewan and Alberta southward nearly to the Rio Grande. Soon afterward, pressure from Europeans and Euro-Americans on all sides and European diseases caused its decline.

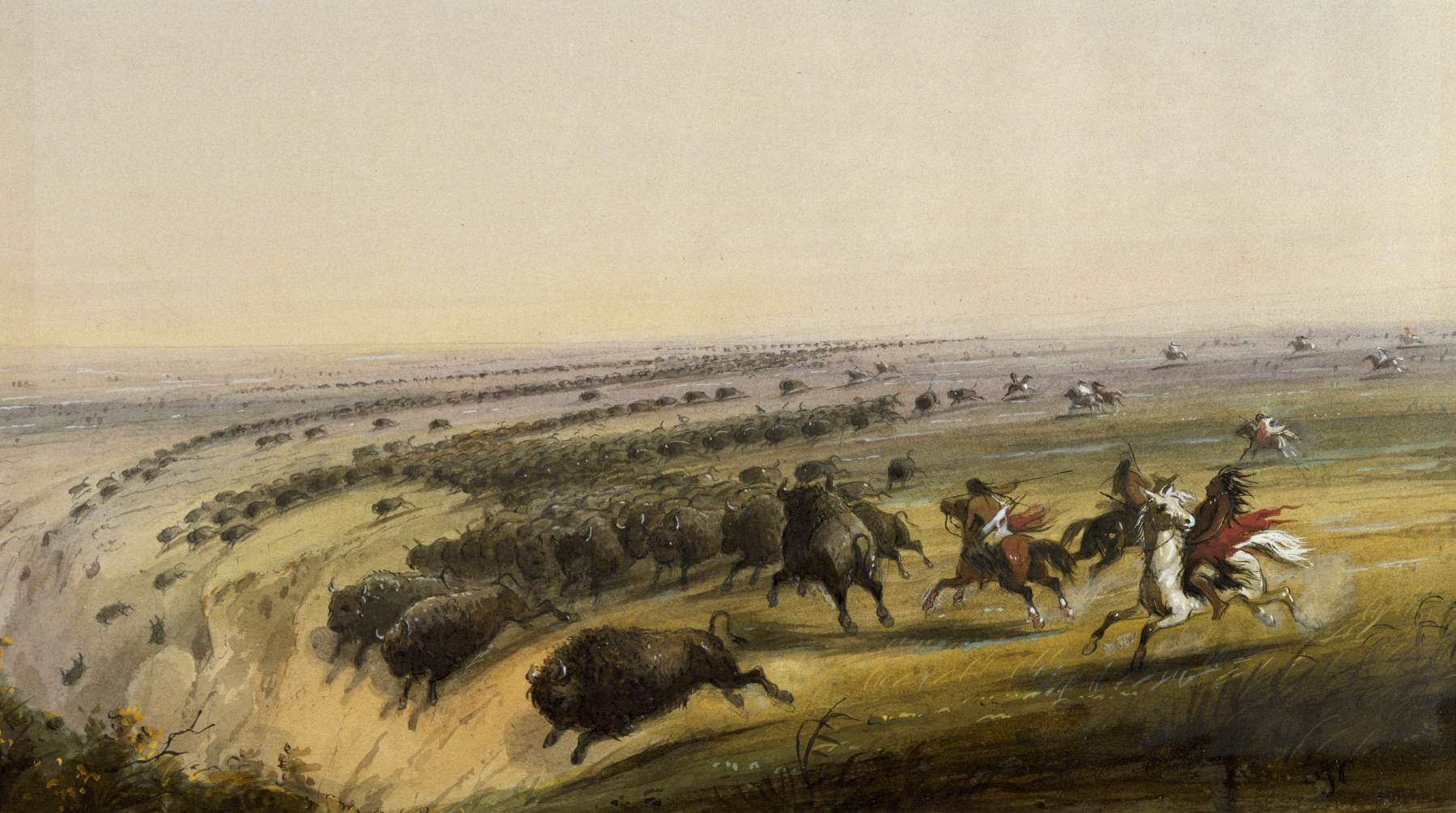
This painting by Alfred Jacob Miller portrays Plains Indians chasing buffalo over a small cliff. The Walters Art Museum.

It was the Comanche, coming to the attention of the Spanish in New Mexico in 1706, who first realized the potential of the horse. As nomads, hunters, and pastoralists, well supplied with horses, they swept most of the mixed-economy Apaches from the plains and by the 1730s were dominant in the Great Plains south of the Arkansas River. The success of the Comanche encouraged other Indian tribes to adopt a similar lifestyle. The southern Plains Indians acquired vast numbers of horses. By the 19th century, Comanche and Kiowa families owned an average of 35 horses and mules each – and only six or seven were necessary for transport and war. The horses extracted a toll on the environment as well as required labor to care for the herd. Formerly egalitarian societies became more divided by wealth with a negative impact on the role of women. The richest men would have several wives and captives who would help manage their possessions, especially horses.

The milder winters of the southern Plains favored a pastoral economy by the Indians. On the northeastern Plains of Canada, the Indians were less favored, with families owning fewer horses, remaining more dependent upon dogs for transporting goods, and hunting bison on foot. The scarcity of horses in the north encouraged raiding and warfare in competition for the relatively small number of horses that survived the severe winters.

The Lakota, also called Teton Sioux, enjoyed the happy medium between North and South and became a dominant Plains tribe by the mid-19th century. They had relatively small horse herds, thus having less impact on their ecosystem. At the same time, they occupied the heart of prime bison range which was also an excellent region for furs, which could be sold to French and American traders for goods such as guns. The Lakota became a highly powerful Plains tribe.

=== Slaughter of the bison ===
This map of the extermination of bison to 1889 is based on William Temple Hornaday's late-nineteenth-century research.

By the 19th century, the typical year of the Lakota and other northern nomads was a communal buffalo hunt as early in spring as their horses had recovered from the rigors of the winter. In June and July the scattered bands of the tribes gathered together into large encampments, which included ceremonies such as the Sun Dance. These gatherings afforded leaders the opportunity to meet to make political decisions, plan movements, arbitrate disputes, and organize and launch raiding expeditions or war parties. In the fall, people would split up into smaller bands to facilitate hunting to procure meat for the long winter. Between the fall hunt and the onset of winter was a time when Lakota warriors could undertake raiding and warfare. With the coming of winter snows, the Lakota settled into winter camps, where activities of the season included ceremonies and dances as well as trying to ensure adequate winter feed for their horses. On the southern plains, with their milder winters, the fall and winter was often the raiding season. Beginning in the 1830s, the Comanche and their allies often raided for horses and other goods deep into Mexico, sometimes venturing 1,000 miles (1,600 km) south from their homes near the Red River in Texas and Oklahoma.

The U.S. federal government and local governments promoted bison hunting for various reasons: to allow ranchers to range their cattle without competition from other bovines and to starve and weaken the Plains Indian population to pressure them to remain on reservations. The bison herds formed the basis of the economies of the Plains tribes. Without bison, they were forced to move onto reservations or starve.

Bison were slaughtered for their skins, with the rest of the animal left behind to decay on the ground. After the animals rotted, their bones were collected and shipped back east in large quantities.

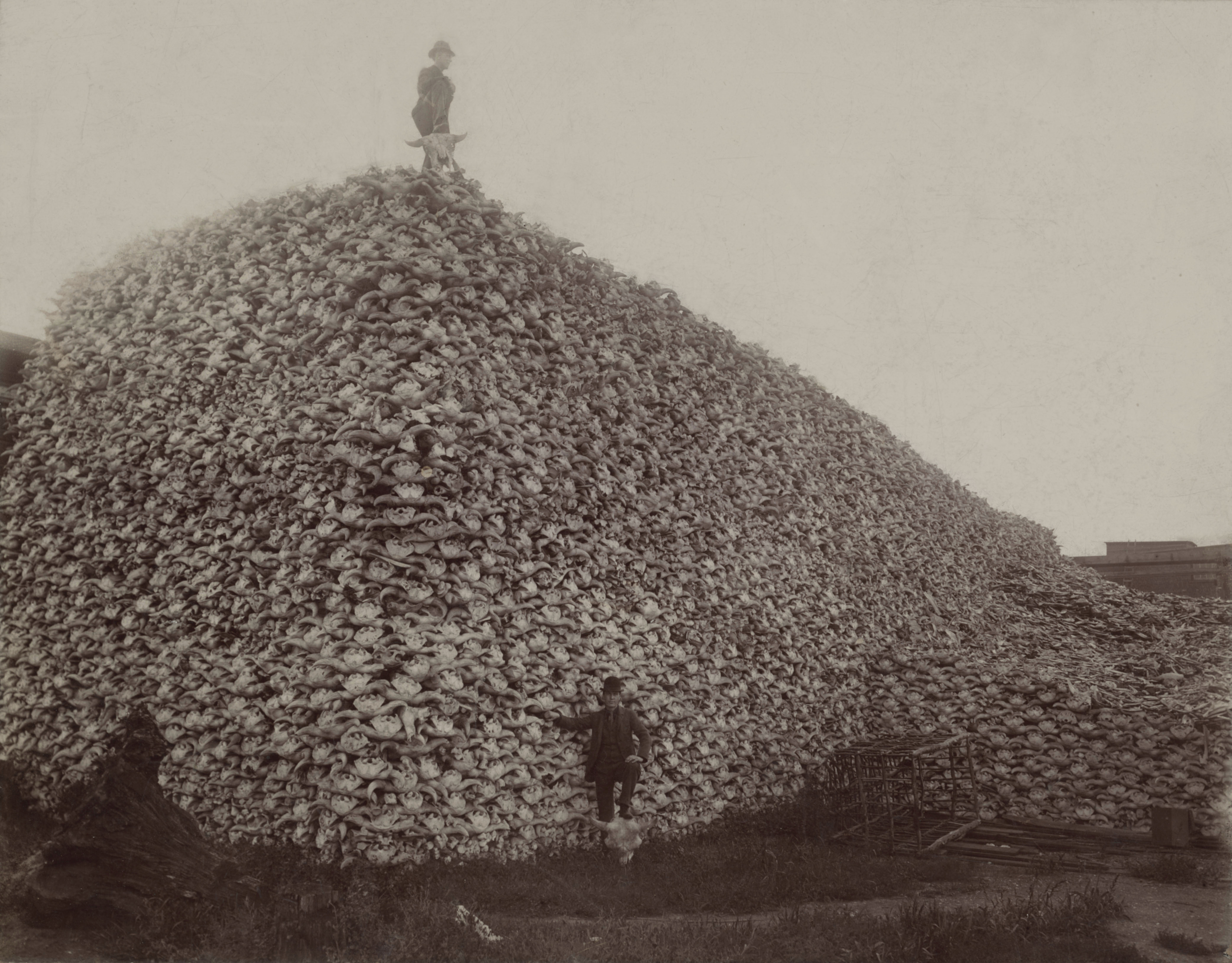
A pile of bison skulls in the 1870s.

The railroad industry also wanted bison herds culled or eliminated. Herds of bison on tracks could damage locomotives when the trains failed to stop in time. Herds often took shelter in the artificial cuts formed by the grade of the track winding through hills and mountains in harsh winter conditions. As a result, bison herds could delay a train for days.

The slaughter of the bison had substantial adverse impacts on the Native American people who relied on them. These impacts were both immediate and persistent. By the early 20th century, bison nations had greater child mortality and unemployment compared to Indian nations that were never reliant on the bison. By the late 20th century, income per capita was 25% lower for bison nations. Whereas people in bison-hunting communities were once among the tallest people in the world, generations born after the slaughter of the bison had lost all their height advantage.

As the great herds began to wane, proposals to protect the bison were discussed. Buffalo Bill Cody, among others, spoke in favor of protecting the bison because he saw that the pressure on the species was too great. But these were discouraged since it was recognized that the Plains Indians, often at war with the United States, depended on bison for their way of life. In 1874, President Ulysses S. Grant "pocket vetoed" a federal bill to protect the dwindling bison herds. In 1875, General Philip Sheridan pleaded to a joint session of Congress to slaughter the herds, to deprive the Plains Indians of their source of food. This meant that the bison were hunted almost to extinction during the 19th century and were reduced to a few hundred by the early 1900s.

=== Indian Wars ===
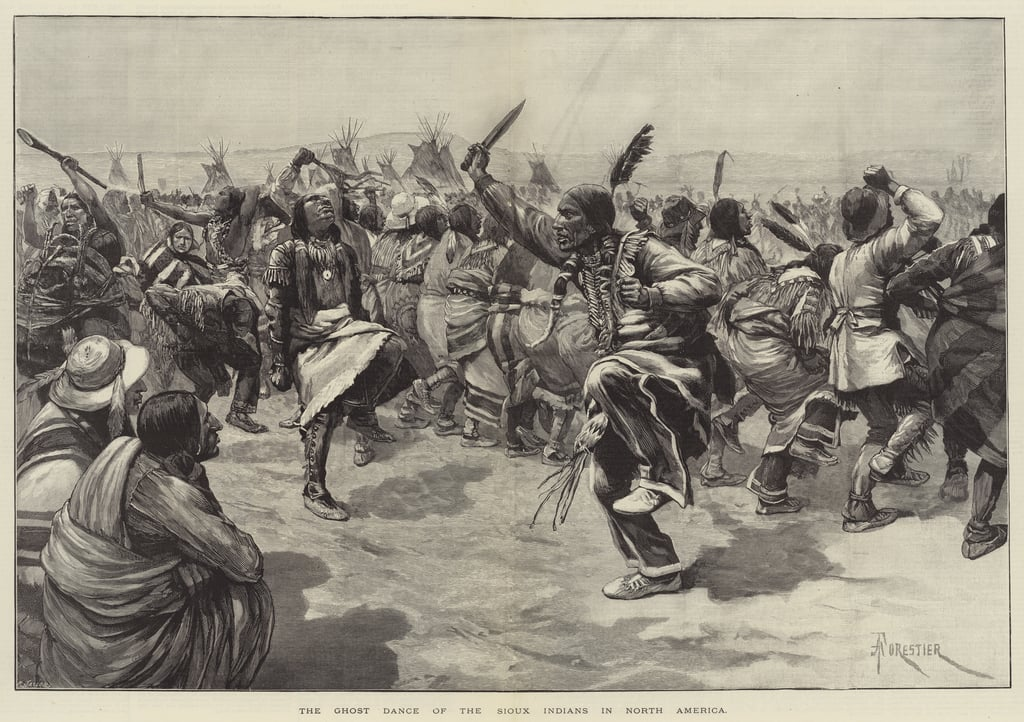
The Ghost Dance ritual, which the Lakota believed would reunite the living with spirits of the dead, cause the white invaders to vanish, and bring peace, prosperity, and unity to Indian peoples throughout the region

Armed conflicts intensified in the late 19th century between Native American nations on the plains and the U.S. government, through what were called generally the Indian Wars. Notable conflicts in this period include the Dakota War, Great Sioux War, Snake War and Colorado War. Comanche power peaked in the 1840s when they conducted large-scale raids hundreds of miles into Mexico proper, while also warring against the Anglo-Americans and Tejanos who had settled in independent Texas. Expressing the frontier anti-Indian sentiment, Theodore Roosevelt believed the Indians were destined to vanish under the pressure of white civilization, stating in an 1886 lecture:

I don't go so far as to think that the only good Indians are dead Indians, but I believe nine out of ten are, and I shouldn't like to inquire too closely into the case of the tenth.

Among the most notable events during the wars was the Wounded Knee Massacre in 1890. In the years leading up to it the U.S. government had continued to seize Lakota lands. A Ghost Dance ritual on the Northern Lakota reservation at Wounded Knee, South Dakota, led to the U.S. Army's attempt to subdue the Lakota. The dance was part of a religious movement founded by the Northern Paiute spiritual leader Wovoka that told of the return of the Messiah to relieve the suffering of Native Americans and promised that if they would live righteous lives and perform the Ghost Dance properly, the European American colonists would vanish, the bison would return, and the living and the dead would be reunited in an Edenic world. On December 29 at Wounded Knee, gunfire erupted, and U.S. soldiers killed up to 300 Indians, mostly old men, women, and children.

== Material culture ==
=== Agriculture and plant foods ===
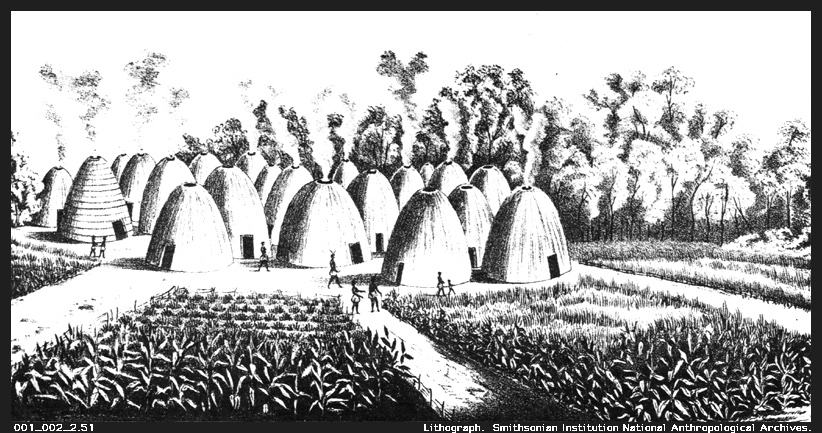
The Wichita were an agrarian Southern Plains tribe, who historically lived in beehive-shaped houses thatched with grass surrounded by extensive maize fields. They were skilled farmers who traded agricultural products with the nomadic tribes in exchange for meat and hides.

The semi-sedentary, village-dwelling Plains Indians depended upon agriculture for a large share of their livelihood, particularly those who lived in the eastern parts of the Great Plains which had more precipitation than the western side. Corn was the dominant crop, followed by squash and beans. Tobacco, sunflower, plums and other plants were also cultivated or gathered in the wild. Among the wild crops gathered the most important were probably berries to flavor pemmican and the Prairie Turnip.

The first indisputable evidence of maize cultivation on the Great Plains is about 900 AD. The earliest farmers, the Southern Plains villagers were probably Caddoan speakers, the ancestors of the Wichita, Pawnee, and Arikara of today. Plains farmers developed short-season and drought resistant varieties of food plants. They did not use irrigation but were adept at water harvesting and siting their fields to receive the maximum benefit of limited rainfall. The Hidatsa and Mandan of North Dakota cultivated maize at the northern limit of its range.

The farming tribes also hunted buffalo, deer, elk, and other game. Typically, on the southern Plains, they planted crops in the spring, left their permanent villages to hunt buffalo in the summer, returned to harvest crops in the fall, and left again to hunt bison in the winter. The farming Indians also traded corn to the nomadic tribes for dried buffalo meat.

With the arrival of the horse, some tribes, such as the Lakota and Cheyenne, gave up agriculture to become full-time, buffalo-hunting nomads.

By the 1870s bison herds were depleted and beef, cereal grains, fats and starchy vegetables became more important in the diet of Plains Indians. Fruits and nuts, especially plums and grapes, were dried as winter store. Flour was made from the Indian breadroot (Pediomelum esculentum). Indian tea (lespedeza) is still sometimes consumed by Plains Indians who have retained these cultural traditions. Plums were one of the most important wild plant foods on the Oklahoma reservation.

=== Hunting ===
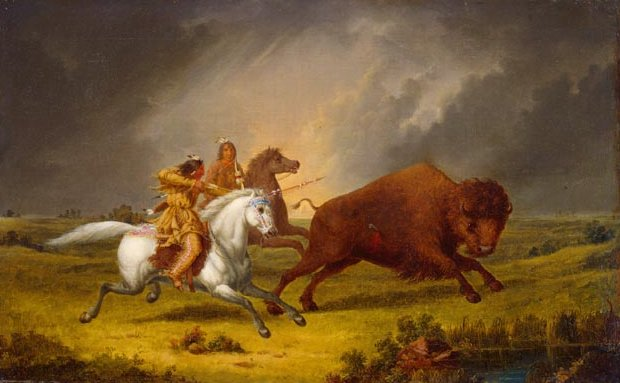
"Assiniboine hunting buffalo", painting by Paul Kane

Although people of the Plains hunted other animals, such as elk or pronghorn, buffalo was the primary game food source. Before horses were introduced, hunting was a more complicated process. Hunters would surround the bison, and then try to herd them off cliffs or into confined places where they could be more easily killed. The Plains Indians constructed a v-shaped funnel, about a mile long, made of fallen trees or rocks. Sometimes bison could be lured into a trap by a person covering himself with a bison skin and imitating the call of the animals.

Before their adoption of guns, the Plains Indians hunted with spears, bows, and various forms of clubs. The use of horses by the Plains Indians made hunting (and warfare) much easier. With horses, the Plains Indians had the means and speed to stampede or overtake the bison. The Plains Indians reduced the length of their bows to three feet to accommodate their use on horseback. They continued to use bows and arrows after the introduction of firearms because guns took too long to reload and were too heavy. In the summer, many tribes gathered for hunting in one place. The main hunting seasons were fall, summer, and spring. In winter, adverse weather such as snow and blizzards made it more difficult to locate and hunt bison.

=== Clothing ===
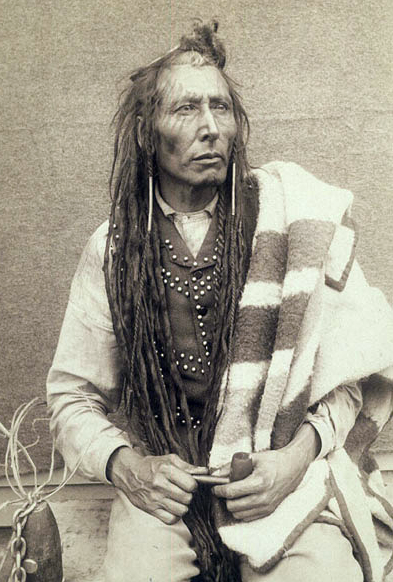
Poundmaker, a Plains Cree chief, wearing a Hudson's Bay "chief's blanket" ca.1885

Hides, with or without fur, provided material for much clothing. Most of the clothing consisted of the hides of buffalo and deer, as well as numerous species of birds and other small game. Plains moccasins tended to be constructed with soft braintanned hide on the vamps and tough rawhide for the soles. Men's moccasins tended to have flaps around the ankles, while women's had high tops, which could be pulled up in the winter and rolled down in the summer. Honored warriors and leaders earn the right to wear war bonnets, headdresses with feathers, often of golden or bald eagles.

== Society and culture ==
=== Religion ===
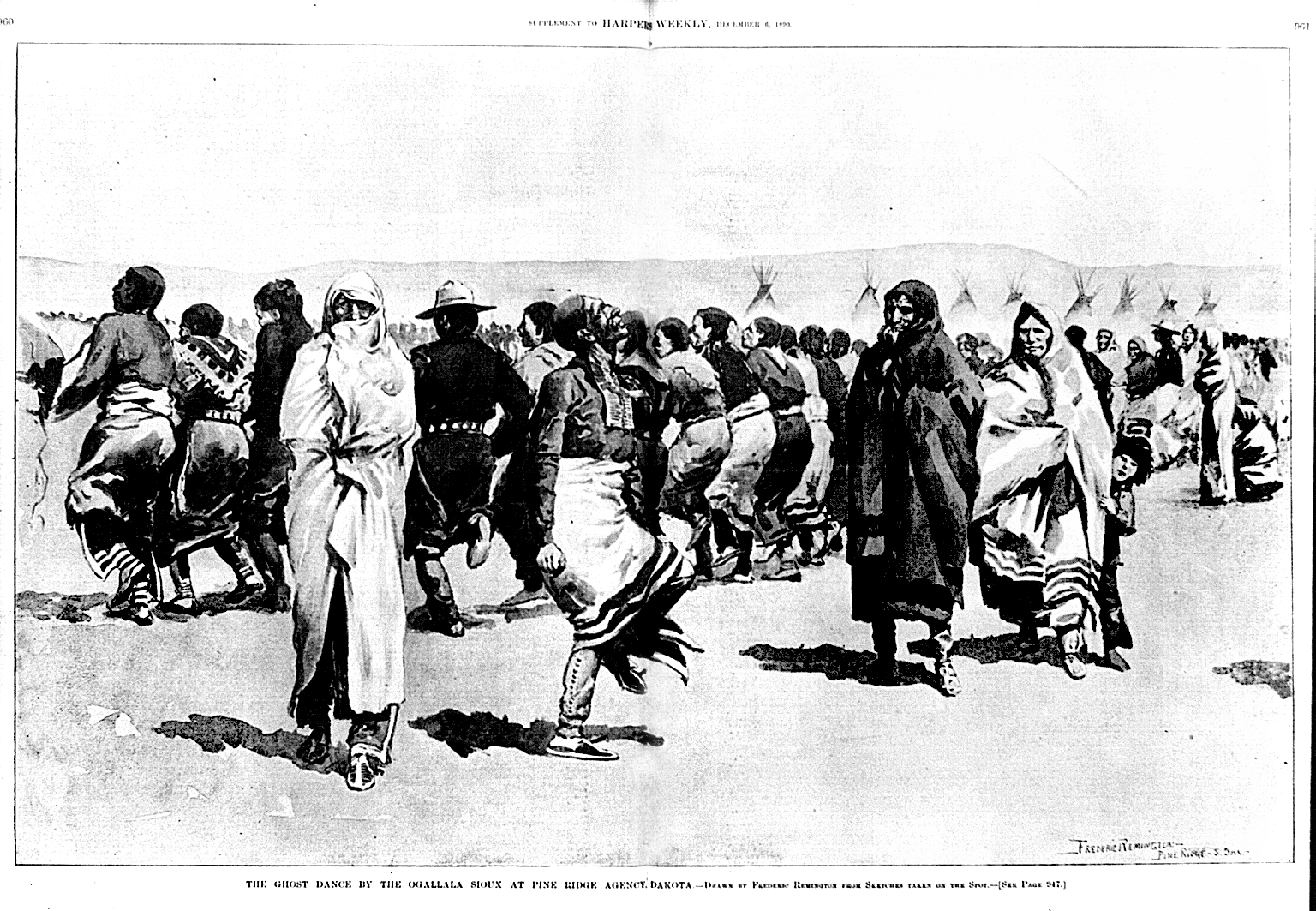
An Oglala Lakota Ghost Dance at Pine Ridge. Illustration by Frederic Remington

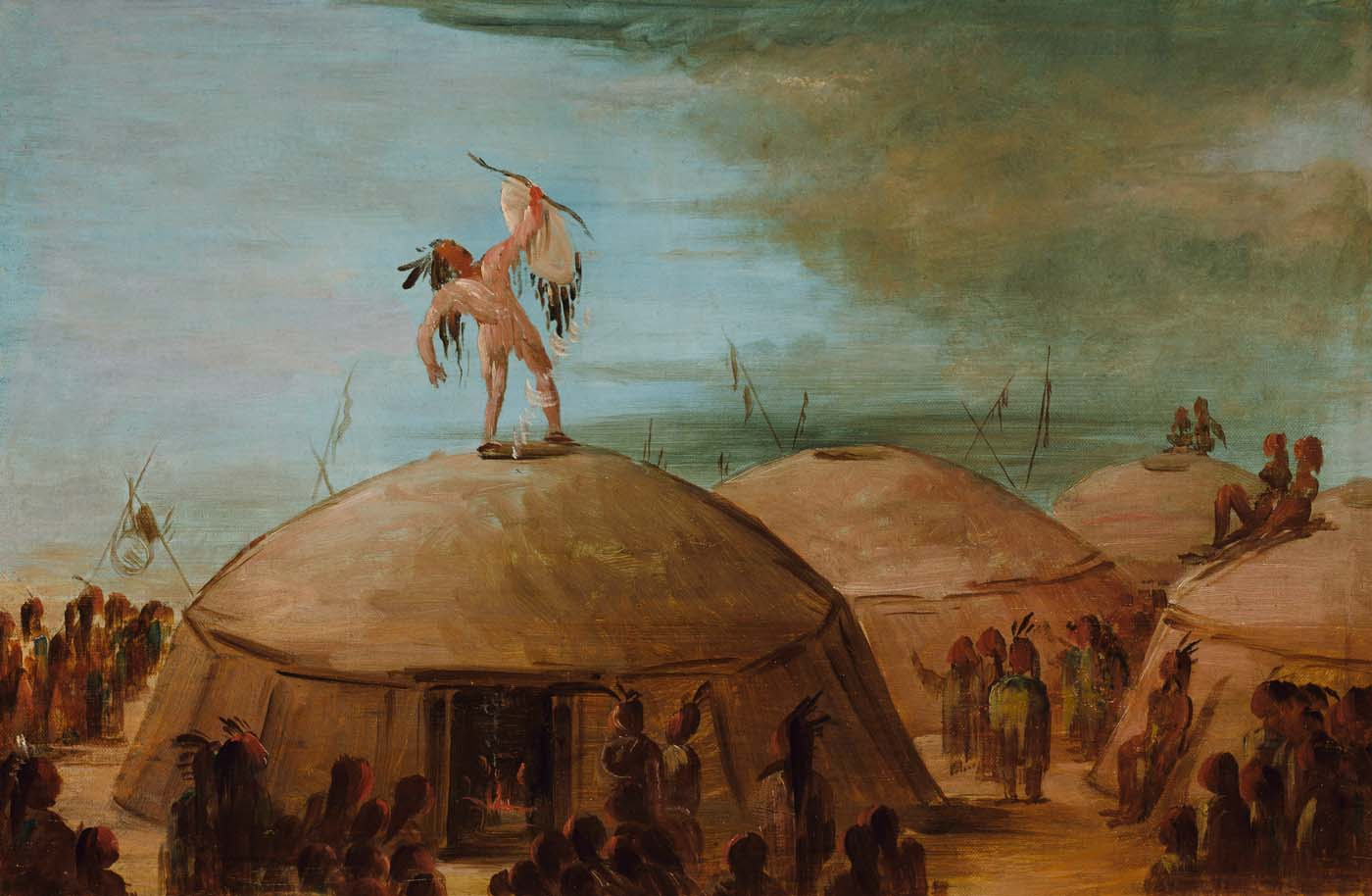
Rainmaking among the Mandan, by George Catlin, 1830s

While there are some similarities among linguistic and regional groups, different tribes have their own cosmologies and world views. Some of these are animist in nature, with aspects of polytheism, while others tend more towards monotheism or panentheism. Prayer is a regular part of daily life, for regular individuals as well as spiritual leaders, alone and as part of group ceremonies. One of the most important gatherings for many of the Plains tribes is the yearly Sun Dance, an elaborate spiritual ceremony that involves personal sacrifice, multiple days of fasting and prayer for the good of loved ones and the benefit of the entire community.

Certain people are considered to be wakan (Lakota: "holy"), and go through many years of training to become medicine men or women, entrusted with spiritual leadership roles in the community. The buffalo and eagle are particularly sacred to many of the Plains peoples, and may be represented in iconography, or parts used in regalia. In Plains cosmology, certain items may possess spiritual power, particularly medicine bundles which are only entrusted to prominent religious figures of a tribe, and passed down from keeper to keeper in each succeeding generation.

=== Gender roles ===
Historically, Plains Indian women had distinctly defined gender roles that were different from, but complementary to, men's roles. They typically owned the family's home and the majority of its contents. In traditional culture, women tanned hides, tended crops, gathered wild foods, prepared food, made clothing, and took down and erected the family's tepees. In the present day, these customs are still observed when lodges are set up for ceremonial use, such as at pow wows. Historically, Plains women were not as engaged in public political life as were the women in the coastal tribes. However, they still participated in an advisory role and through the women's societies.

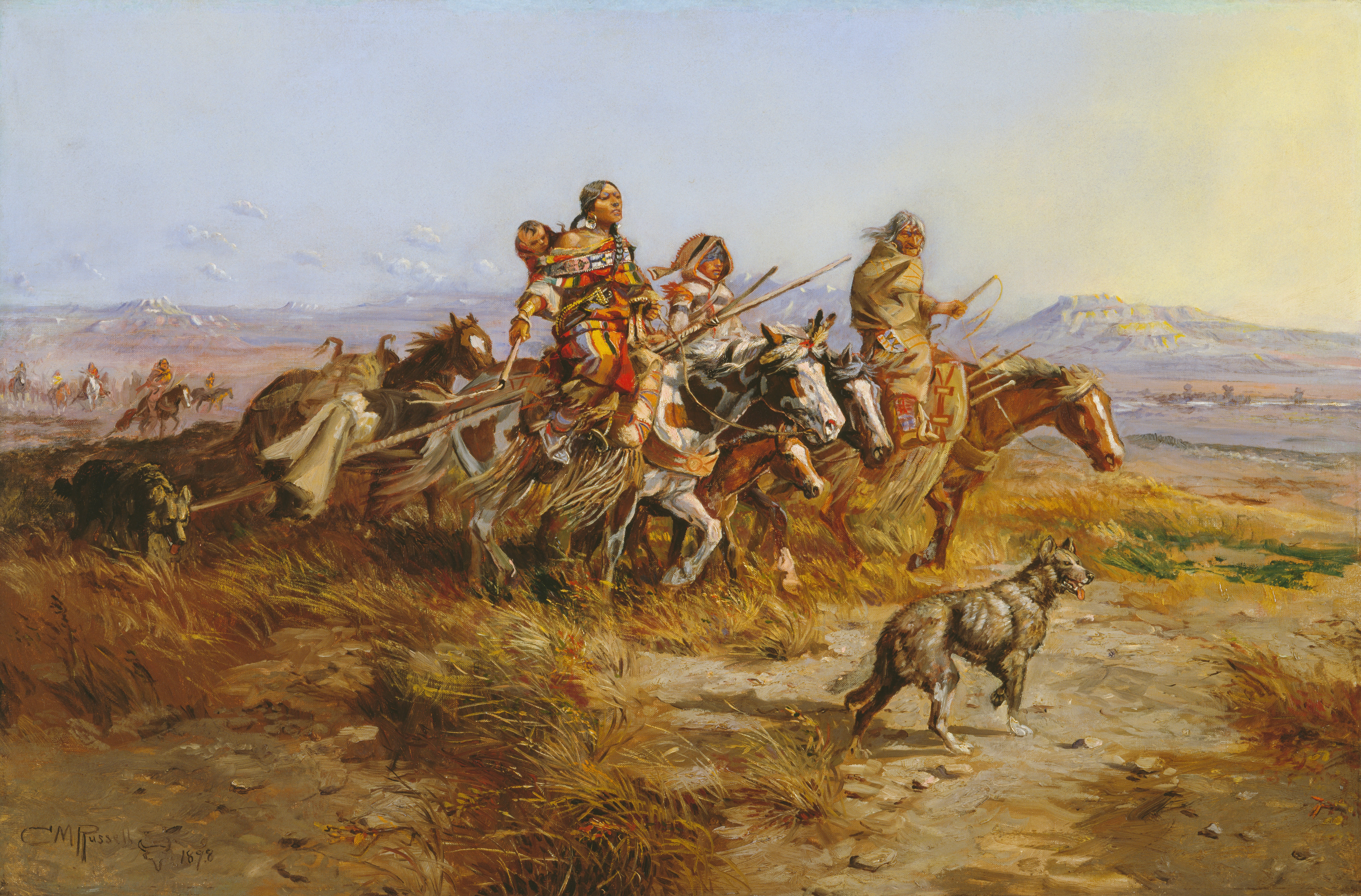
"Indian women moving", painting by Charles Marion Russell

In contemporary Plains cultures, traditionalists work to preserve the knowledge of these traditions of everyday life and the values attached to them.

Plains women in general have historically had the right to divorce and keep custody of their children. Because women own the home, an unkind husband can find himself homeless. A historical example of a Plains woman divorcing is Making Out Road, a Cheyenne woman, who in 1841 married non-Native frontiersman Kit Carson. The marriage was turbulent and formally ended when Making Out Road threw Carson and his belongings out of her tepee (in the traditional manner of announcing a divorce). She later went on to marry, and divorce, several additional men, both European-American and Indian.

=== Warfare ===
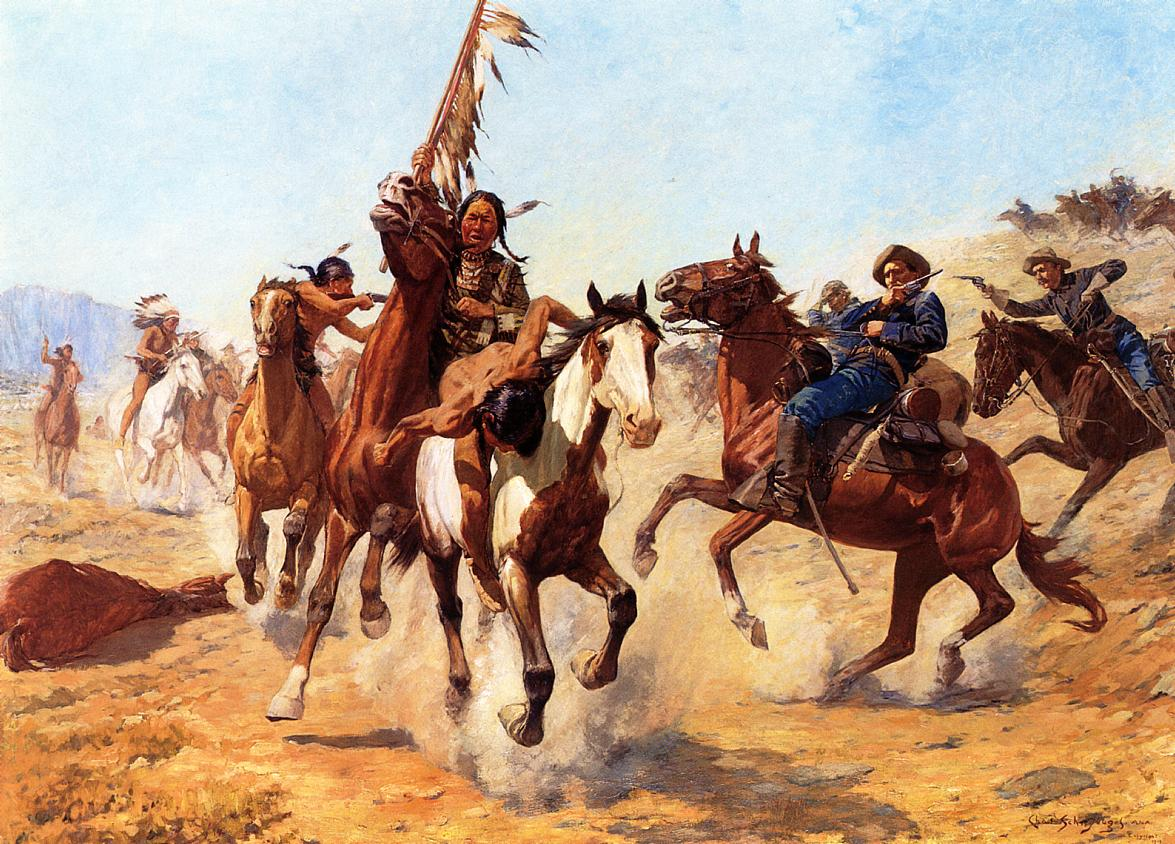
This painting depicts the speed and violence of an encounter between the U.S. cavalry and Plains Indians.

The earliest 16th-century Spanish explorers did not find the Plains Indians especially warlike. The Wichita in Kansas and Oklahoma lived in dispersed settlements with few defensive works. The Spanish initially had friendly contacts with the Apache (Querechos) in the Texas Panhandle.

Three factors led to a growing importance of warfare in Plains Indian culture. First, was the Spanish colonization of New Mexico which stimulated raids and counter-raids by Spaniards and Indians for goods and slaves. Second, was the contact of the Indians with French fur traders which increased rivalry among Indian tribes to control trade and trade routes. Third, was the acquisition of the horse and the greater mobility it afforded the Plains Indians. What evolved among the Plains Indians from the 17th to the late 19th century was warfare as both a means of livelihood and a sport. Young men gained both prestige and plunder by fighting as warriors, and this individualistic style of warfare ensured that success in individual combat and capturing trophies of war were highly esteemed

The Plains Indians raided each other, the Spanish colonies, and, increasingly, the encroaching frontier of the Anglos for horses, and other property. They acquired guns and other European goods primarily by trade. Their principal trading products were buffalo hides and beaver pelts. The most renowned of all the Plains Indians as warriors were the Comanche whom The Economist noted in 2010: "They could loose a flock of arrows while hanging off the side of a galloping horse, using the animal as protection against return fire. The sight amazed and terrified their white (and Indian) adversaries." The American historian S. C. Gwynne called the Comanche "the greatest light cavalry on the earth" in the 19th century whose raids in Texas terrified the American settlers.

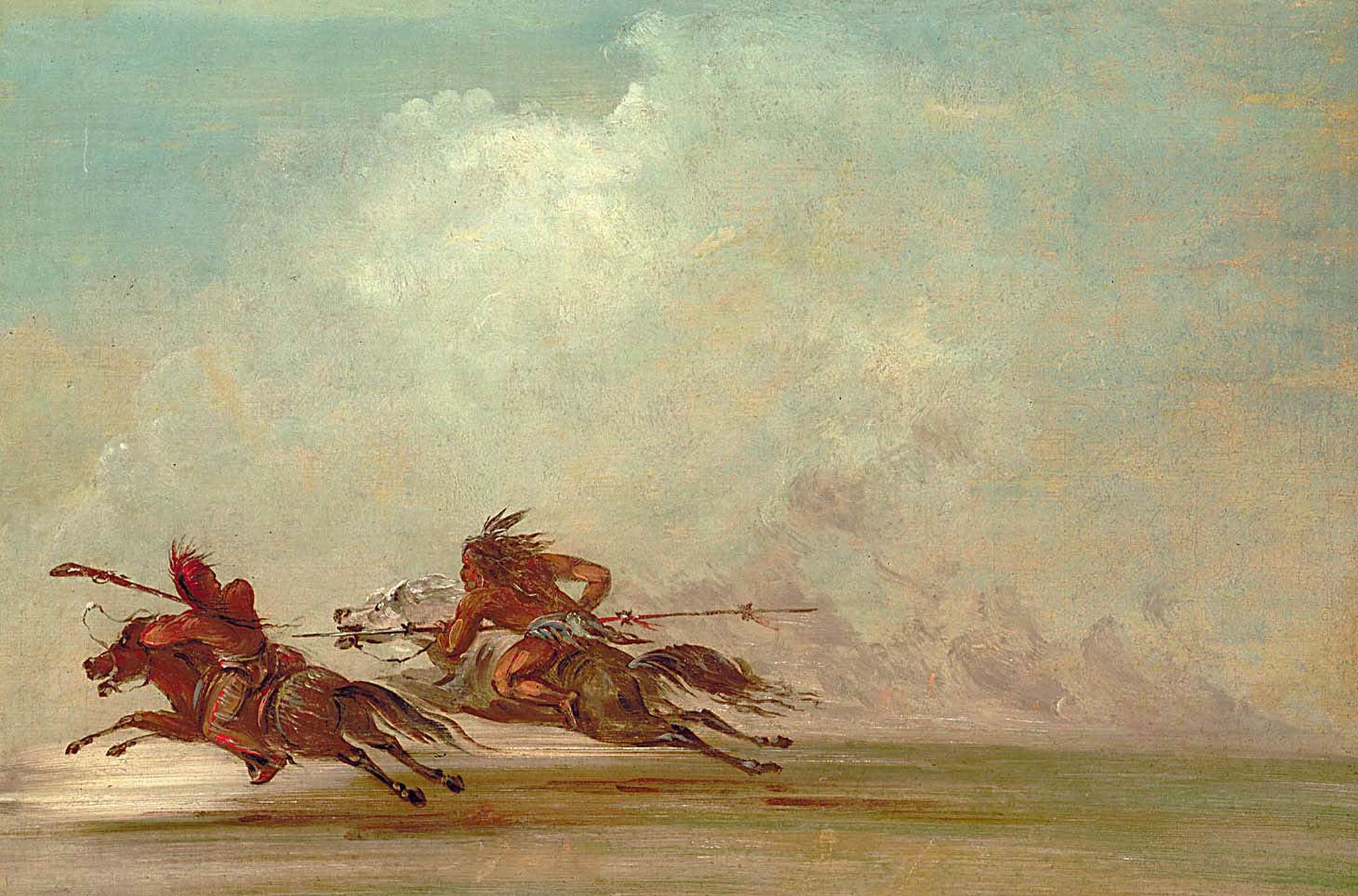
War on the Plains: Comanche (right) trying to lance an Osage warrior, painting by George Catlin, 1834

Although they could be tenacious in defense, Plains Indians warriors took the offensive mostly for material gain and individual prestige. The highest military honors were for "counting coup"—touching a live enemy. Battles between Indians often consisted of opposing warriors demonstrating their bravery rather than attempting to achieve concrete military objectives. The emphasis was on ambush and hit and run actions rather than closing with an enemy. Success was often counted by the number of horses or property obtained in the raid. Casualties were usually light. "Indians consider it foolhardiness to make an attack where it is certain some of them will be killed." Given their smaller numbers, the loss of even a few men in battle could be catastrophic for a band, and notably at the battles of Adobe Walls in Texas in 1874 and Rosebud in Montana in 1876, the Indians broke off battle despite the fact that they were winning as the casualties were not considered worth a victory. The most famous victory ever won by the Plains Indians over the United States, the Battle of Little Bighorn, in 1876, was won by the Lakota (Sioux) and Cheyenne fighting on the defensive. Decisions whether to fight or not were based on a cost-benefit ratio; even the loss of one warrior was not considered to be worth taking a few scalps, but if a herd of horses could be obtained, the loss of a warrior or two was considered acceptable. Generally speaking, given the small sizes of the bands and the vast population of the United States, the Plains Indians sought to avoid casualties in battle, and would avoid fighting if it meant losses.

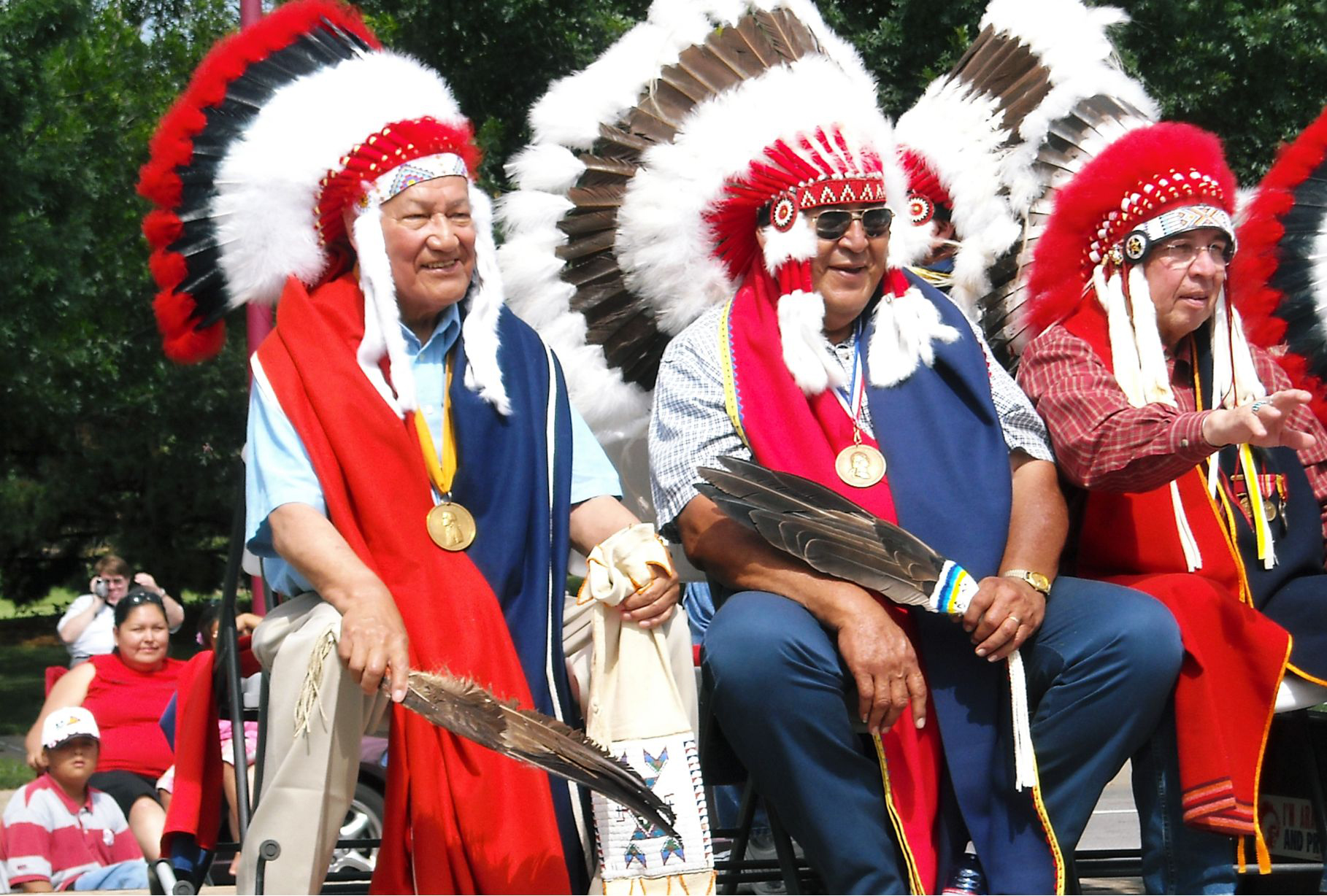
Southern Cheyenne Chiefs Lawrence Hart, Darryl Flyingman and Harvey Pratt in Oklahoma City, 2008

Due to their mobility, endurance, horsemanship, and knowledge of the vast plains that were their domain, the Plains Indians were often victors in their battles against the U.S. army in the American era from 1803 to about 1890. However, although Indians won many battles, they could not undertake lengthy campaigns. Indian armies could only be assembled for brief periods of time as warriors also had to hunt for food for their families. The exception to that was raids into Mexico by the Comanche and their allies in which the raiders often subsisted for months off the riches of Mexican haciendas and settlements. The basic weapon of the Indian warrior was the short, stout bow, designed for use on horseback and deadly, but only at short range. Guns were usually in short supply and ammunition scarce for Native warriors. The U.S. government through the Indian Agency would sell the Plains Indians guns for hunting, but unlicensed traders would exchange guns for buffalo hides. The shortages of ammunition together with the lack of training to handle firearms meant the preferred weapon was the bow and arrow.

== Research ==
The people of the Great Plains have been found to be the tallest people in the world during the late 19th century, based on 21st century analysis of data collected by Franz Boas for the World Columbian Exposition. This information is significant to anthropometric historians, who usually equate the height of populations with their overall health and standard of living.

== List of peoples ==
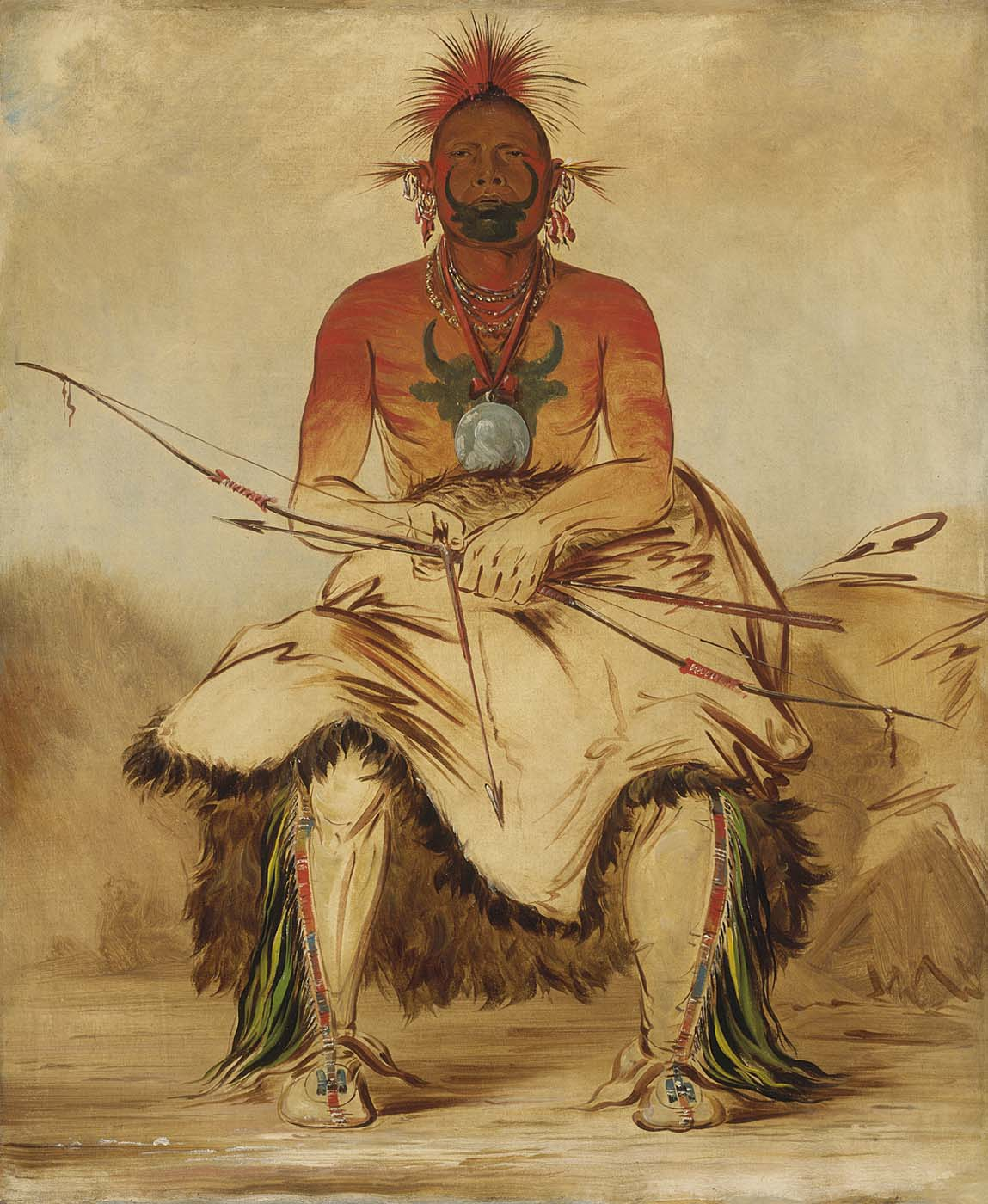
Pawnee warrior, by George Catlin, 1832

Indigenous peoples of the Great Plains are often separated into Northern and Southern Plains tribes.

- Anishinaabe (Anishinape, Anicinape, Neshnabé, Nishnaabe) (see also Indigenous peoples of the Northeastern Woodlands)
  - Saulteaux (Nakawē), Manitoba, Minnesota and Ontario; later Alberta, British Columbia, Montana, Saskatchewan
- Apache (see also Southwest)
  - Lipan Apache, New Mexico, Texas
  - Plains Apache (Kiowa Apache), Oklahoma
  - Querecho Apache, Texas
- Arapaho (Arapahoe), formerly Colorado, currently Oklahoma and Wyoming
  - Besawunena
  - Nawathinehena
- Arikara (Arikaree, Arikari, Ree), North Dakota
- Atsina (Gros Ventre), Montana
- Blackfoot
  - Kainai Nation (Káínaa, Blood), Alberta
  - Northern Peigan (Aapátohsipikáni), Alberta
  - Southern Piegan (Aamsskáápipikani), Montana
  - Siksika (Siksikáwa), Alberta
- Cheyenne, Montana, Oklahoma
  - Suhtai, Montana, Oklahoma
- Comanche, Oklahoma, Texas
- Plains Cree, Montana, Saskatchewan, Alberta, Manitoba
- Crow (Absaroka, Apsáalooke), Montana
- Escanjaques, Oklahoma
- Hidatsa, North Dakota
- Iowa (Ioway), Kansas, Nebraska, Oklahoma
- Kaw (Kansa, Kanza), Kansas, Oklahoma
- Kiowa, Oklahoma
- Mandan, North Dakota
- Métis people (Canada), North Dakota, Manitoba, Saskatchewan, Alberta
- Missouri (Missouria), Oklahoma
- Omaha, Nebraska
- Osage, Oklahoma, formerly Arkansas, Missouri
- Otoe (Oto), Oklahoma, formerly Missouri
- Pawnee, Oklahoma
  - Chaui, Oklahoma
  - Kitkehakhi, Oklahoma
  - Pitahawirata, Oklahoma
  - Skidi, Oklahoma
- Ponca, Nebraska, Oklahoma
- Quapaw, formerly Arkansas, Oklahoma
- Sioux (Očhéthi Šakówiŋ, Seven Council Fires)
  - Dakota, Minnesota, Montana, Nebraska, North Dakota, South Dakota, Manitoba, Saskatchewan
    - Bdewékhaŋthuŋwaŋ (Spirit Lake Village)
    - Sisíthuŋwaŋ (Swamp/lake/fish Scale Village)
    - Waȟpékhute (Leaf Archers)
    - Waȟpéthuŋwaŋ (Leaf Village)
    - Iháŋkthuŋwaŋ (End Village)
    - Iháŋkthuŋwaŋna (Little End Village)
  - Lakota (Thítȟuŋwaŋ, Dwellers on the Prairies), Montana, North Dakota, South Dakota, Saskatchewan
    - Sičháŋǧu (Brulé, Burned Thighs)
    - Oglála (Scatters Their Own)
    - Itázipčho (Sans Arc, No Bows)
    - Húŋkpapȟa (Hunkpapa)
    - Mnikȟówožu (Miniconjou)
    - Sihásapa (Blackfoot Sioux)
    - Oóhenuŋpa (Two Kettles)
  - Nakoda (Stoney), Alberta
  - Nakota, Assiniboine (Assiniboin), Montana, Saskatchewan
- Teyas, Texas
- Tonkawa, Oklahoma
- Tsuu T'ina (Sarcee, Sarsi, Tsuut'ina), Alberta
- Wichita and Affiliated Tribes (Kitikiti'sh), Oklahoma, formerly Texas and Kansas
  - Kichai (also related to the Caddo), Oklahoma, formerly Texas and Kansas
  - Taovayas (Tawehash), Oklahoma, formerly Texas and Kansas
  - Tawakoni, Oklahoma, formerly Texas and Kansas
  - Waco (Iscani, Yscani), Oklahoma, formerly Texas
  - Wichita proper, Guichita, Rayados, Oklahoma, formerly Texas and Kansas

== See also ==
- Comanche-Mexico Wars
- Plains Standard Sign Language
- Plains hide painting
- Hair drop, Plains men's adornment
- Native American tribes in Nebraska
- Buffalo jump
- Southern Plains villagers
- Spanish peace treaties with the Comanche

== See also ==
- Great Plains Indian Trading Networks before Lewis and Clark
