= Pediomelum canescens =

Scientific classification
- Kingdom: Plantae
- Clade: Tracheophytes
- Clade: Angiosperms
- Clade: Eudicots
- Clade: Rosids
- Order: Fabales
- Family: Fabaceae
- Subfamily: Faboideae
- Genus: Pediomelum
- Species: P. canescens

Binomial name
- Pediomelum canescens (Michx.) Rydb.

Synonyms
- Lotodes canescens (Michx.) Kuntze; Psoralea canescens Michx.

Species of flowering plant

Pediomelum canescens, commonly known as buckroot, hoary scurfpea, and eastern prairie-turnip, is a species of perennial legume endemic to the southeast region of the United States.

== Description ==
Pediomelum canescens grows as a shrub or subshrub, reaching between 30 and 100 cm (1.0 and 3.3 ft) in height. The leaves may be palmate or odd-pinnate, and are 1 to 3 foliate. Leaflets are elliptic to obovate in shape, ranging between 1.5 and 6 cm (0.6 and 2.4 in) in length and 1 to 3 cm (0.4 to 1.2 in) in width.

When inflorescence occurs, blooms are blue to purple in color. Petals may be between 8 and 15 mm (0.3 and 0.6 in) in length. When fruit is produced it is ovoid in shape and approximately 1 centimeters in length.

== Distribution and habitat ==
This species's native range encompasses the United States coastal plain, stretching from southeastern Virginia to Florida and westward to Alabama.

This species primarily occurs in sandy habitats, such as within pine flatwoods or longleaf pine sandhills.
