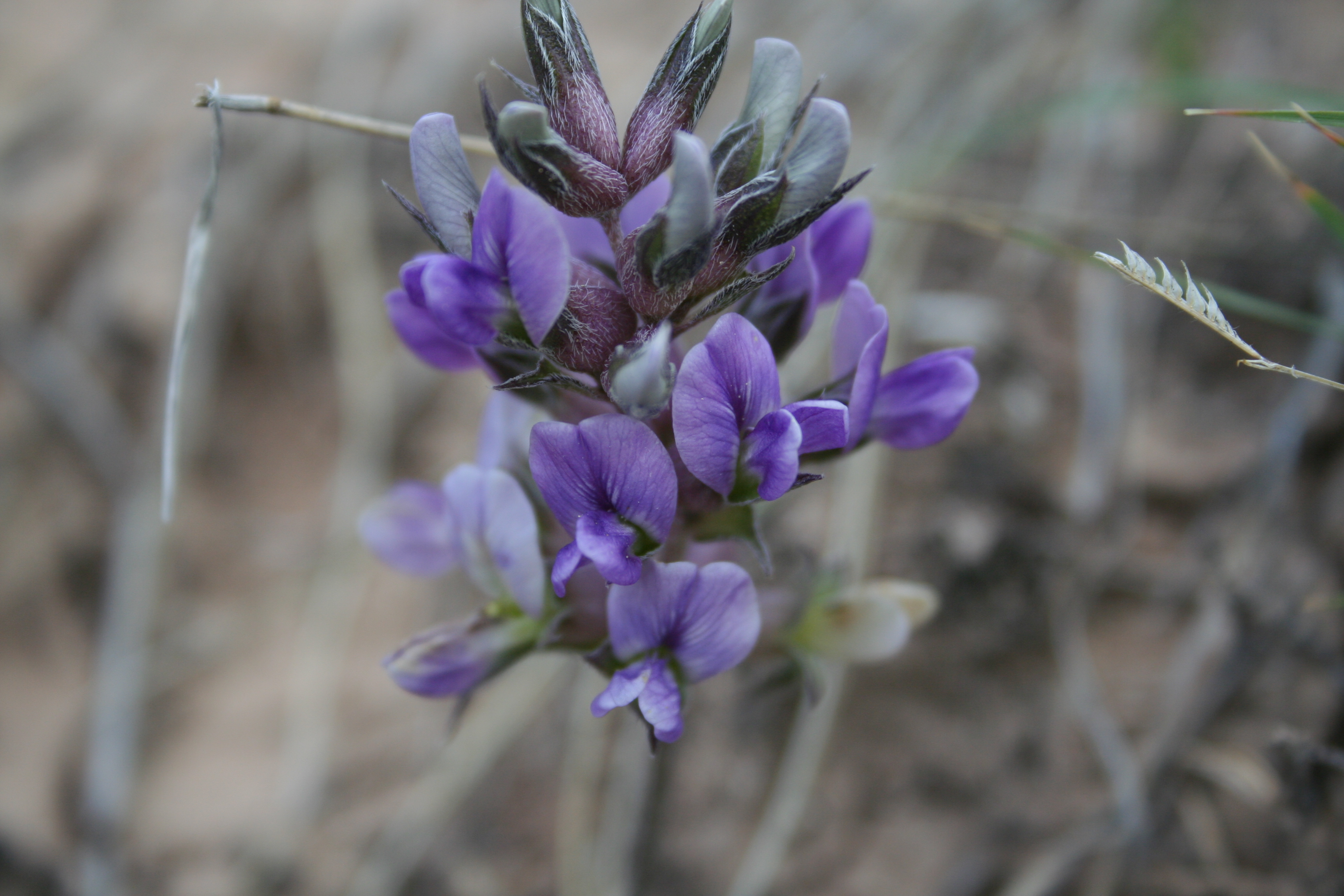
- In bloom in Badlands National Park, South Dakota

Conservation status
- Secure (NatureServe)

Scientific classification
- Kingdom: Plantae
- Clade: Tracheophytes
- Clade: Angiosperms
- Clade: Eudicots
- Clade: Rosids
- Order: Fabales
- Family: Fabaceae
- Subfamily: Faboideae
- Genus: Pediomelum
- Species: P. esculentum

Binomial name
- Pediomelum esculentum (Pursh) Rydb.

Synonyms
- Lotodes esculentum (Pursh) Kuntze; Psoralea brachiata Douglas ex Hook.; Psoralea esculenta Pursh; Psoralea fruticosa Kellogg, nom. illeg.

= Pediomelum esculentum =

Plant species in the pea family

Pediomelum esculentum, synonym Psoralea esculenta, common name prairie turnip or timpsila, is an herbaceous perennial plant native to prairies and dry woodlands of central North America, which bears a starchy tuberous root edible as a root vegetable. English names for the plant include tipsin, teepsenee, breadroot, breadroot scurf pea, large Indian breadroot, prairie potato and pomme blanche. The prairie turnip continues to be a staple food of the Plains Indians.

A related species, Pediomelum hypogaeum (syn. Psoralea hypogaea), the little breadroot, is also edible, although the plant and root are smaller. Another species, Pediomelum argophyllum (syn. Psoralea argophylla), was probably harvested for food only in times of famine. (Note: This paper describes the nature and role of P. esculentum and P. argophyllum as wild plant foods among the Indians of the northern plains during the fur trade period. From this analysis, it is apparent that P. argophyllum was exploited for food mainly in times of necessity. P. esculentum, in contrast, was widely and regularly used, and formed a valuable food resource of high nutritional quality. When dried or converted into flour, P. esculentum functioned as a vegetable food resource among the equestrian hunters of the northern plains in a manner akin to, but on a smaller scale than, wild rice or maize among the Indians of the more humid, wooded environments of the east. Finally, the paper suggests that it was in the plains environment, rather than in the prairie, that the Pediomelum resource played its most significant role in meeting the vegetable needs of grassland Indians in both prehistoric and historic time.)

== Description and range ==
The prairie turnip has a range on the Great Plains from Manitoba south to Texas and from Wisconsin west to Montana. It grows best in full sun on well-drained and rocky or sandy soil. The plant is referred to by the Indians of Iowa as Tipsina, the seed-bearing plant is due to climatic conditions especially in high, dry spots and can be found near rivers or in the steppe. (Note: This is a report by Gaudichaud and Payen on Lamare-Picquot's essay, which deals with and describes the introduction of two new food plants of P. esculentum and Apios tuberosa.) The relative scarcity of the plant today compared to its previous abundance may be because most prairie has been converted to farmland or managed grassland.

The prairie turnip is a perennial, living 3 to more than 6 years. In spring, several densely haired stems emerge from the ground and reach up to 30 cm (12 in), bearing palmately compound leaves divided into five leaflets. In early summer the plant produces abundant blue or purple flowers in terminal clusters 5 to 10 cm (4 in) long, leading to flattened, slender-tipped pods. Harvest of the tubers is during flowering. The flowers and flower stalk break off and disappear soon after flowering, making the plant difficult to locate. The plant grows from one or more sturdy brown roots which form rounded, spindle-shaped tubers about 7 to 10 cm (4 in) below the surface, each 4 to 10 cm (4 in) long.

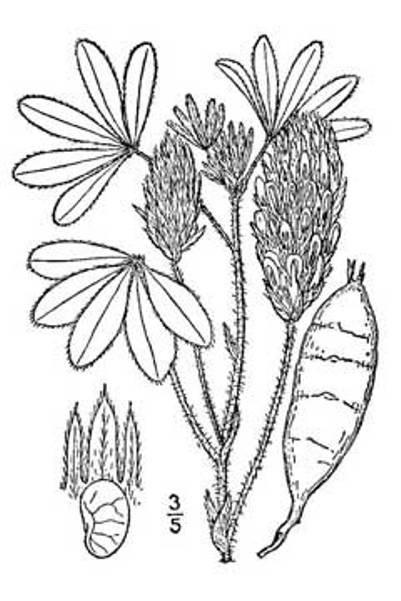
The leaves, flowers, tubers and seeds of the prairie turnip.

The Lakota name for the plant is timpsila. The name of Topeka, the capital city of Kansas, is believed to mean a "good place to dig prairie turnips" in the Kansa and other southern Siouan languages.

== Harvest ==
Abundant under favorable conditions, palatable, and nutritious, the prairie turnip was once a wild-gathered staple food of the Plains Indians, especially the nomads, and of early European explorers. It was harvested May through July when the blooming flower stalks were easily visible among prairie grasses. The Indians, usually women, harvested the root with a sharpened, fire-hardened digging stick. The tubers have a hard, dark skin and are peeled before eating. Some were eaten immediately, either raw or boiled, but most were dried for further use. They were sliced and sun dried, braided and hung on meat racks to dry, and pounded into flour.

The prairie turnip was also a reliable food in times of shortage or famine. A number of examples have been recorded of Indians and whites subsisting on the root for extended periods when other food could not be obtained. The prairie turnip is more nutritious than most root crops, containing about 7 percent protein, more than 50 percent carbohydrates, and is rich in vitamins and trace minerals. Particularly important was the vitamin C content of 17.1 milligrams per 100 grams as the winter meat-rich diet of the Plains Indians was often deficient in vitamin C.

The prairie turnip takes 2 to 4 years to grow from seed to mature root. The long period required for maturation probably limited the success of any efforts the Indians made to cultivate the plant. Garden plantings have been made by scientists to evaluate the potential for domestication.

== Culinary use ==
As a food, the prairie turnip has been described variously as a "delicacy," "tolerably good eating," or "tasteless and insipid." Barry Kaye and D. W. Moodie describe the Native Americans’ use of it as food as follows: "they eat it uncooked, or they boil it, or roast it in the embers, or dry it, and crush it to powder and make soup of it. Large quantities are stored in buffalo skin bags for winter use. A sort of pudding made of the flour of the dried roots and with the serviceberries (Amelanchier alnifolia), after boiling together, is very palatable and a favorite dish."

The root can be peeled and eaten raw or cooked. The dried root can be ground into flour, and then boiled with serviceberries (Amelanchier alnifolia) to make a sweet pudding.

Prairie turnip flour is often used as a "secret ingredient" in modern Indian frybread recipes.
