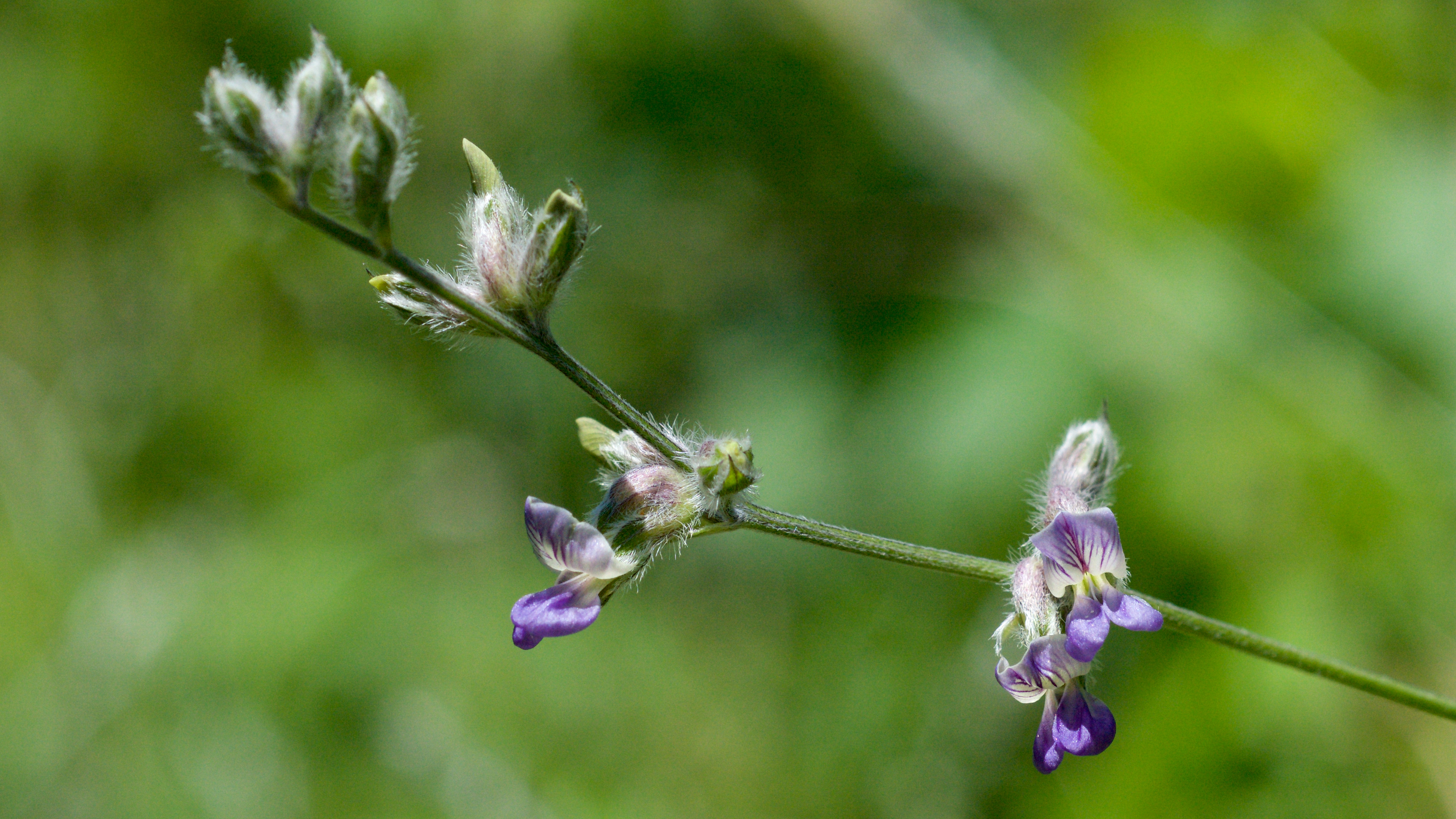

Conservation status
- Secure (NatureServe)

Scientific classification
- Kingdom: Plantae
- Clade: Tracheophytes
- Clade: Angiosperms
- Clade: Eudicots
- Clade: Rosids
- Order: Fabales
- Family: Fabaceae
- Subfamily: Faboideae
- Genus: Pediomelum
- Species: P. digitatum

Binomial name
- Pediomelum digitatum (Nutt.) Isely

Synonyms
- List: Lotodes campestre (Nutt.) Kuntze (1891); Lotodes digitatum (Nutt.) Kuntze (1891); Pediomelum digitatum var. parvifolium (Shinners) Gandhi & L.E.Br. (1989); Psoralea campestris Nutt. (1838); Psoralea digitata Nutt. (1838); Psoralea digitata var. parvifolia Shinners (1951); Psoralidium digitatum (Nutt.) Rydb. (1919)

= Pediomelum digitatum =

Plant species in the pea family

Pediomelum digitatum is a species of flowering plant in the legume family known by the common name palmleaf Indian breadroot. It is found in the central United States.
