= Pediomelum californicum =

Scientific classification
- Kingdom: Plantae
- Clade: Tracheophytes
- Clade: Angiosperms
- Clade: Eudicots
- Clade: Rosids
- Order: Fabales
- Family: Fabaceae
- Subfamily: Faboideae
- Genus: Pediomelum
- Species: P. californicum

Binomial name
- Pediomelum californicum (S.Watson) Rydb.

Synonyms
- Psoralea californica

Species of legume

Pediomelum californicum is a species of flowering plant in the legume family known by the common name California Indian breadroot. It is endemic to California, where it grows in the chaparral and woodlands of the coastal mountain ranges. It is a perennial herb with no stem or a short stem that is mostly underground, leaving the plant at ground level. The compound leaves are each made up of five to seven oval leaflets which may be nearly 3 centimetres (1 1/4 in) long. The inflorescence is a raceme of several blue or purple pealike flowers each about one centimetre (2/5 in) long. The fruit is a hairy oval beak-tipped legume pod up to one centimetre (2/5 in) long containing smooth kidney-shaped seeds.
