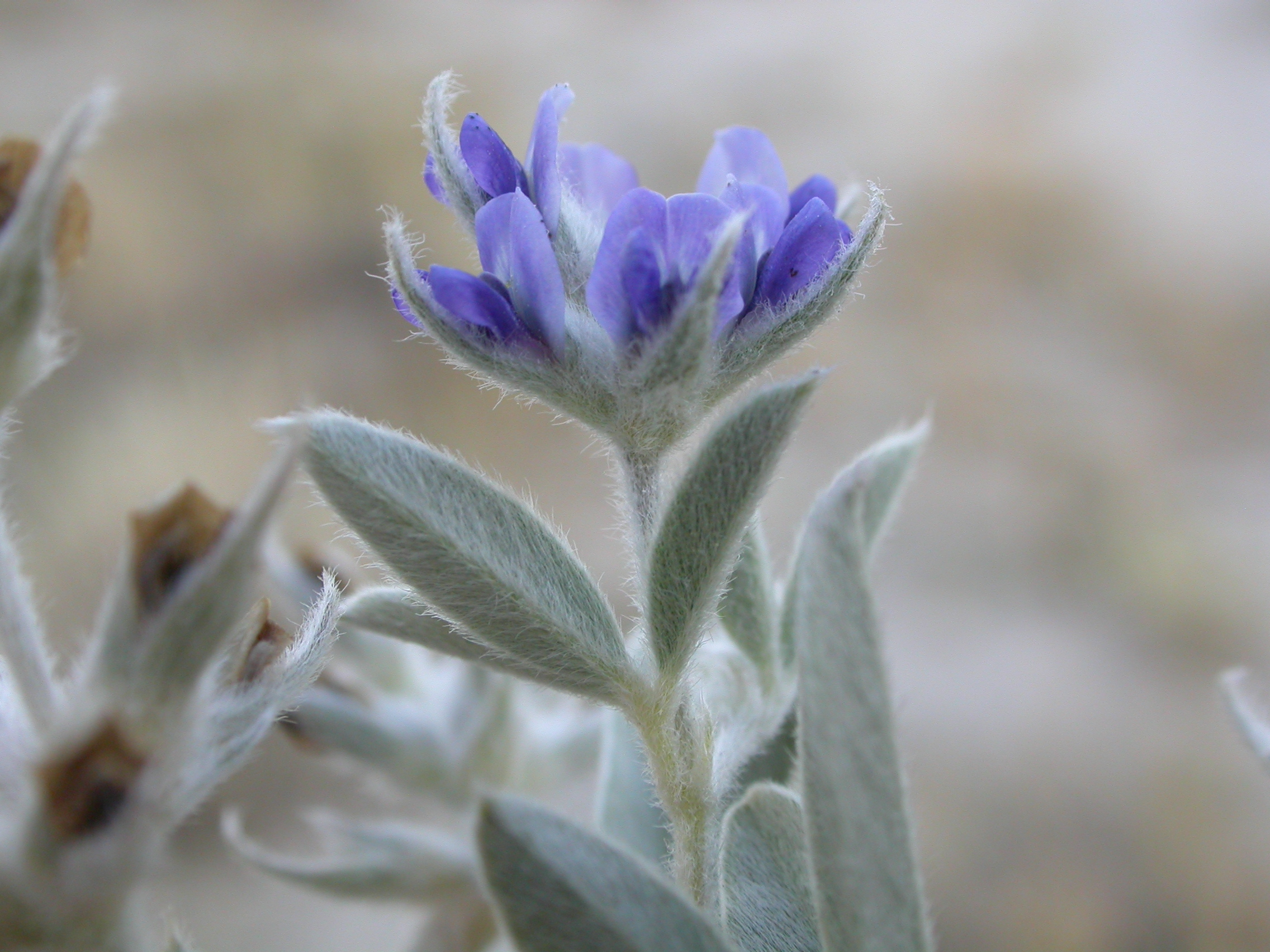

Conservation status
- Secure (NatureServe)

Scientific classification
- Kingdom: Plantae
- Clade: Tracheophytes
- Clade: Angiosperms
- Clade: Eudicots
- Clade: Rosids
- Order: Fabales
- Family: Fabaceae
- Subfamily: Faboideae
- Genus: Pediomelum
- Species: P. argophyllum

Binomial name
- Pediomelum argophyllum (Pursh) J.W.Grimes

Synonyms
- List: Lotodes argophyllum (Pursh) Kuntze (1891); Psoralea argophylla Pursh (1813); Psoralea argophylla var. decumbens A.Gray (1860); Psoralea argophylla var. robustior Bates (1914); Psoralea collina Rydb. (1895); Psoralea incana Nutt. (1818); Psoralidium argophyllum (Pursh) Rydb. (1919); Psoralidium collinum (Rydb.) Rydb. (1919)

= Pediomelum argophyllum =

Plant species in the pea family

Pediomelum argophyllum, synonym Psoralea argophylla, (common name silverleaf Indian breadroot) is a species of legume in the family Fabaceae. The species is native to the central United States, as well as the three Canadian prairie provinces, Alberta, Saskatchewan, and Manitoba. Pediomelum argophyllum grows naturally as a forb, and it grows perennially.
