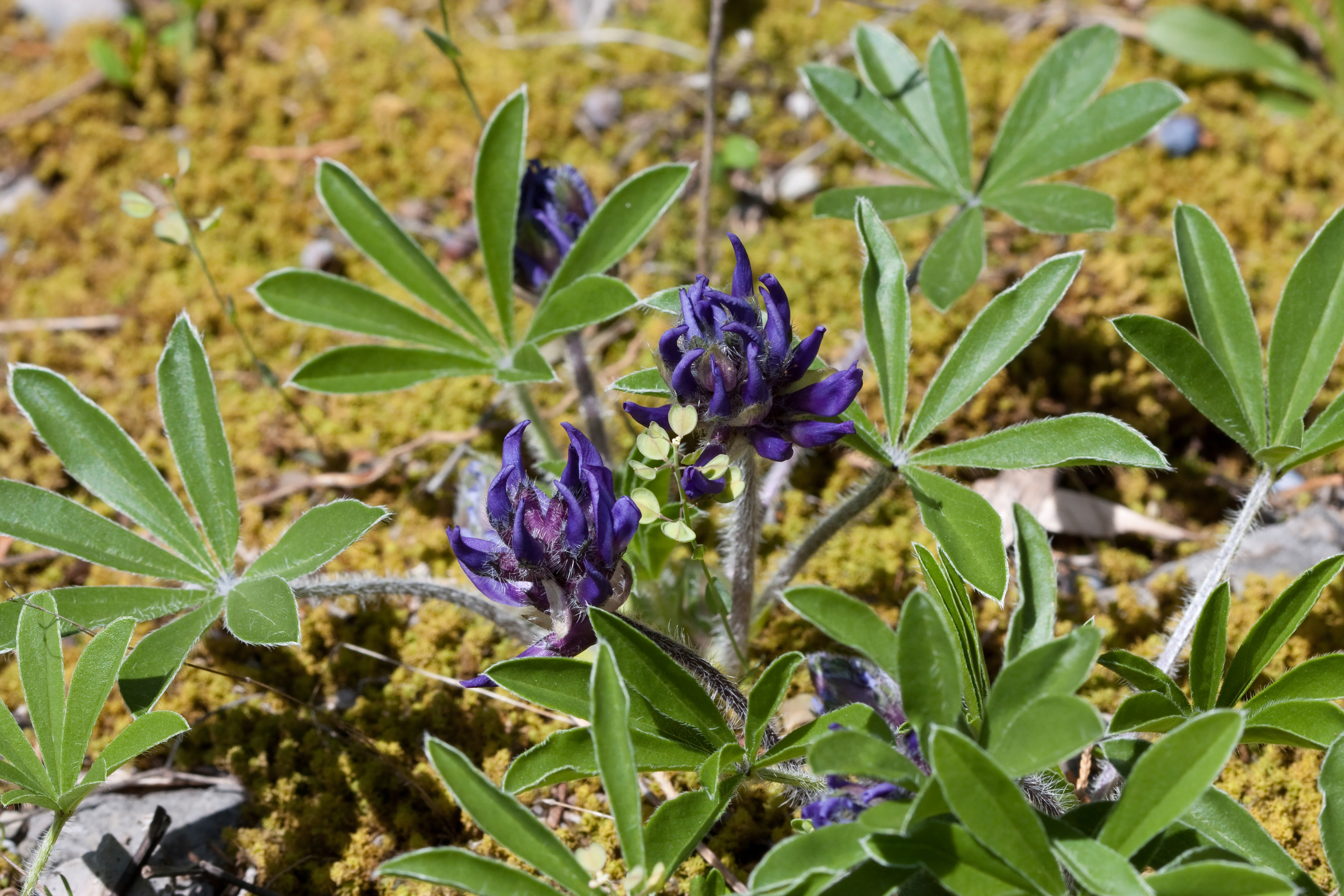
- Pediomelum subacaule

Scientific classification
- Kingdom: Plantae
- Clade: Tracheophytes
- Clade: Angiosperms
- Clade: Eudicots
- Clade: Rosids
- Order: Fabales
- Family: Fabaceae
- Subfamily: Faboideae
- Tribe: Psoraleeae
- Genus: Pediomelum; Rydb.

Species
- 22+1: See text.

= Pediomelum =

Genus of legumes

Pediomelum is a genus of legumes known as Indian breadroots. These are glandular perennial plants with palmately-arranged leaves. They have a main erect stem with inflorescences of blue or purple flowers and produce hairy legume pods containing beanlike seeds. Some species have woody roots while others have starchy tuber-like roots which can be eaten like tuber vegetables such as potatoes or made into flour. Indian breadroots are native to North America. Many species have synonymy with genus Psoralea.

Selected species:

- Pediomelum argophyllum - silverleaf Indian breadroot
- Pediomelum aromaticum - aromatic Indian breadroot
- Pediomelum californicum - California Indian breadroot
- Pediomelum canescens - buckroot
- Pediomelum castoreum - beaver Indian breadroot
- Pediomelum cuspidatum - largebract Indian breadroot
- Pediomelum cyphocalyx - turniproot
- Pediomelum digitatum - palmleaf Indian breadroot
- Pediomelum esculentum - large Indian breadroot
- Pediomelum humile - Rydberg's Indian breadroot
- Pediomelum hypogaeum - subterranean Indian breadroot
- Pediomelum latestipulatum - Texas Plains Indian breadroot
- Pediomelum linearifolium - narrowleaf Indian breadroot
- Pediomelum megalanthum - intermountain Indian breadroot
- Pediomelum mephiticum - skunktop
- Pediomelum pariense - Paria River Indian breadroot
- Pediomelum pentaphyllum - small Indian breadroot
- Pediomelum reverchonii - rock Indian breadroot
- Pediomelum rhombifolium - gulf Indian breadroot
- Pediomelum subacaule - Nashville breadroot
- Pediomelum tenuiflorum - slimflower scurfpea
