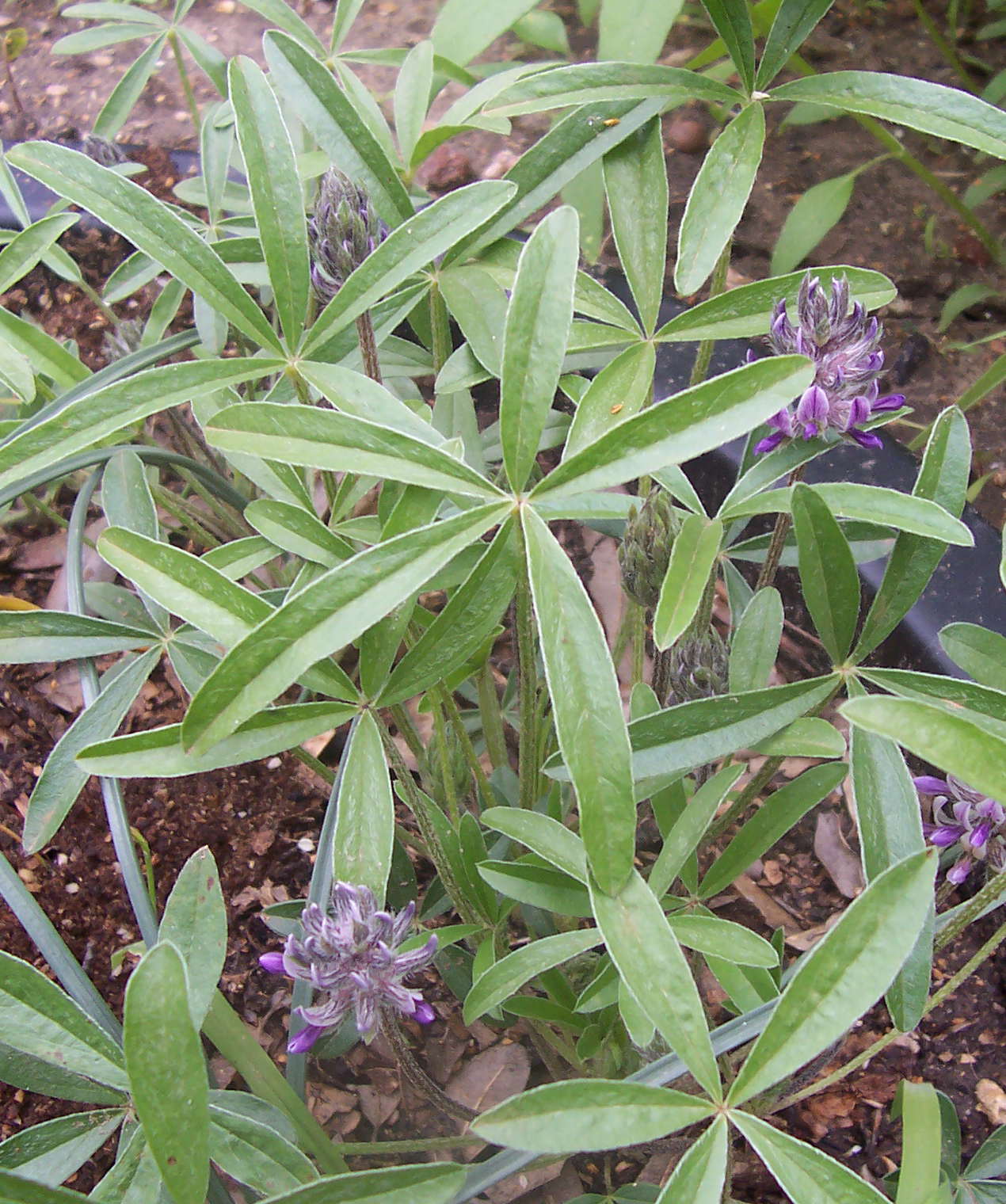

Conservation status
- Secure (NatureServe)

Scientific classification
- Kingdom: Plantae
- Clade: Tracheophytes
- Clade: Angiosperms
- Clade: Eudicots
- Clade: Rosids
- Order: Fabales
- Family: Fabaceae
- Subfamily: Faboideae
- Genus: Pediomelum
- Species: P. hypogaeum

Binomial name
- Pediomelum hypogaeum (Nutt.) Rydb.

= Pediomelum hypogaeum =

Species of legume

Pediomelum hypogaeum (also known as Psoralea hypogaea) is a perennial herb also known as the little Indian breadroot or subterranean Indian breadroot. It is found on the black soil prairies in Texas.

== Growth ==
It has an inflorescence on stems 5-6 centimeters long, separate from the leaves, arising from a subterranean stem and deep carrot-shaped root that is 3–7 cm long. The long petioled leaves are palmately divided into 5 linear-elliptic leaflets that are 3-5 centimeters long. The flowers, borne in condensed spikes separate from the leaves, are purple and pea-like, and have a surprisingly strong scent, reminiscent of lemon furniture polish. The species has edible tuberous roots, high in protein.
