= La Toma =

La Toma (Spanish: The taking) was a significant legal declaration made by Don Juan de Oñate on April 30, 1598. This event marked the formal assertion of Spanish sovereignty over the territories north of the Rio Grande, in present-day Texas, and laid the groundwork for the colonization of New Mexico.

== Background ==
Don Juan de Oñate was a Spanish explorer and conquistador born in 1550 in what is now Mexico. He was the son of Cristóbal de Oñate, one of the founders of Zacatecas. In his youth, Oñate engaged in military campaigns against indigenous groups such as the Chichimecas. His ambitions led him to seek permission from the Spanish crown to explore and settle new territories in North America, which he received in 1595 from Viceroy Luis de Velasco.

Oñate's expedition began in 1598, comprising over 400 Tlaxcaltecs, soldiers, priests, and supplies necessary for establishing a settlement. The expedition aimed not only to conquer but also to spread Christianity among the native populations. Oñate financed this venture himself and was granted titles that conferred significant authority over the newly acquired lands.

== Declaration of La Toma ==
On April 30, 1598, during a ceremony on the banks of the Rio Grande, Oñate performed La Toma. He declared that all lands drained by the river were now possessions of King Philip II of Spain. This act was not merely ceremonial; it served as a legal justification for his subsequent military actions against local Pueblo tribes.

Oñate's proclamation included a solemn oath that he would govern these territories with "peace, friendship, and Christianity," emphasizing his intention to convert indigenous peoples to Catholicism while asserting Spanish dominion over their lands. The declaration was framed within the context of Spanish imperial law, specifically referencing the requerimiento, which mandated that indigenous peoples be informed of Spain's claims to their lands and offered a chance to accept Spanish rule peacefully before any military action could be taken.

== Consequences and historical significance ==
La Toma is often regarded as a pivotal moment in the history of Spanish colonization in North America. It symbolized the beginning of a long period of European dominance over indigenous populations in what is now the southwestern United States. Following this declaration, Oñate led military campaigns against various Pueblo tribes, including a notorious siege at Acoma Pueblo in 1599 that resulted in significant loss of life and harsh reprisals against the Acoma people.

The actions taken by Oñate after La Toma would later lead to his prosecution for excessive cruelty towards Native Americans. His governance style came under scrutiny due to reports of violence and oppression against indigenous communities, culminating in his eventual banishment from New Mexico by the Spanish crown.

Despite this legacy of violence, La Toma itself is viewed by some historians as one of the foundational events marking the start of Spanish colonial rule in the American Southwest, shaping future interactions between European settlers and Native American tribes.
