= Vicente de Zaldívar =

Spanish soldier and explorer

- Born: c. 1573; Pánuco, Zacatecas
- Died: before 1650; Zacatecas
- Spouse: María de Oñate
- Children: Nicolas de Zaldívar y Oñate
- Parent(s): Vicente de Zaldívar, Sr. Magdalena de Mendoza y Salazar
- Relatives: Cristóbal de Oñate (paternal great-uncle); Juan de Oñate (paternal uncle & second cousin); Juan de Zaldívar (brother)

Vicente de Zaldívar (c. 1573 – before 1650) was a Spanish soldier and explorer in New Mexico. He led the Spanish force that perpetrated the Acoma Massacre at Acoma Pueblo in 1599. He led or participated in several expeditions onto the Great Plains.

== Early life ==
Vicente de Zaldívar was born in Pánuco, Zacatecas, circa 1573. The Zaldivar and Oñate families of Zacatecas and New Mexico were prominent and intertwined. His father, Vicente de Zaldívar Sr., served in the Chichimeca War of 1550-1590 and other wars alongside his uncle (thus Vicente's great-uncle), Cristóbal de Oñate. His mother was Magdalena de Mendoza y Salazar. He had a brother, Juan de Zaldívar. Juan de Oñate, the founder of the Spanish colony of New Mexico in 1598, was their uncle and second cousin.

== Career ==
In 1595, Zaldívar was appointed Sargento mayor by his uncle, Juan de Oñate, in their colonization of New Mexico for the Spanish Crown. They arrived in New Mexico in 1598.

=== Buffalo hunting ===
Food and resources were scarce in the young colony of New Mexico. On September 15, 1598, Zaldívar and his guide, Jusepe Gutierrez, led a group of 60 men onto the Great Plains to determine whether bison, the American buffalo, could be domesticated. Departing from Pecos Pueblo, Zaldívar journeyed 57 leagues eastward, about 250 kilometres (160 mi), probably to the Canadian River valley. There he found huge herds of buffalo. Zaldívar and his men constructed a large corral in which they attempted to capture several thousand buffalo. The buffalo were recalcitrant and killed three horses and wounded 40 more. Zaldívar then captured a number of buffalo calves, but all of them quickly died. Failing in the attempt to domesticate buffalo, Zaldívar focused instead on hunting and returned to the Spanish settlements with 80 arobas, about 1,000 kilograms (2,200 lb) of buffalo fat. He proclaimed buffalo meat superior to the beef of Spanish cows. Zaldívar and his men arrived back at the Spanish settlements on November 8, 1598.

=== Acoma ===
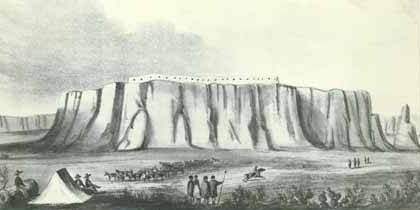
1848 lithograph of Acoma Pueblo

After his brother Juan de Zaldívar and other Spaniards were killed by Native Americans at Acoma Pueblo in New Mexico on December 4, 1598, Zaldívar was promoted to Maestre de Campo, second in command to Oñate. In January 1599, Zaldívar avenged his brother's death in an attack on Acoma, culminating in the Acoma Massacre in which hundreds of Acomans were killed or enslaved. Poet Gaspar Pérez de Villagrá subsequently wrote a poem about his victory.

=== Jumano War ===
Zaldívar was maestro de campo in the expedition to Quivira in 1601. During that process, he encountered the Jumano people and participated in the Jumano War of 1601.

== Personal life ==
Zaldívar married María de Oñate, who was his cousin (Juan de Oñate's daughter). Their only offspring was a son, Nicolás de Zaldívar y Oñate, who was later appointed Adelantado.

== Later life and death ==
Zaldívar received the Order of Santiago in 1626. He died by 1650.
