= Statue of Juan de Oñate =

Statue of Juan de Oñate may refer to:

- Equestrian statue of Juan de Oñate (Alcade, New Mexico)
- Statue of Juan de Oñate (Albuquerque, New Mexico)
