= Pánuco Municipality =

Pánuco Municipality may refer to:

- Pánuco Municipality, Veracruz
- Pánuco Municipality, Zacatecas
