= Henry of Segusio =

Italian cardinal (c. 1200–1271)

Enrico da Susa, latinised as Henricus de Segusio and anglicized as Henry of Segusio and often referred to by the religious name Hostiensis, (c. 1200 – 6 or 7 November 1271) was an Italian canonist of the thirteenth century, born at Susa (Segusio), in the ancient Diocese of Turin. He died at Lyon.

== Life ==
He undertook the study of Roman law and canon law at Bologna, where he seems to have taught Canon Law, and to have taken his degree utriusque juris. He taught canon law at Paris, and spent some time in England, whence King Henry III sent him on a mission to Innocent IV.

Later, he became Provost of the Cathedral Chapter of Antibes, and chaplain to the pope. He was promoted to the See of Sisteron in 1244, afterwards to the Archdiocese of Embrun in 1250. In 1259, he replaced the captured Filippo da Pistoia as papal legate in Lombardy. He became Cardinal Bishop of Ostia and Velletri on 22 May 1262, whence his name Hostiensis.

His health forced him to leave the conclave of 1268–1271, though he remained at Viterbo. He was not present at the compromise election of Tedaldo Visconti on 1 September 1271, after the vacancy in the Holy See of two years and nine months. Nonetheless, the other cardinals immediately sought out Cardinal Enrico and obtained his consent to the election. In his room, he wrote his Last Will and Testament on 29 October 1271.

== Works ==
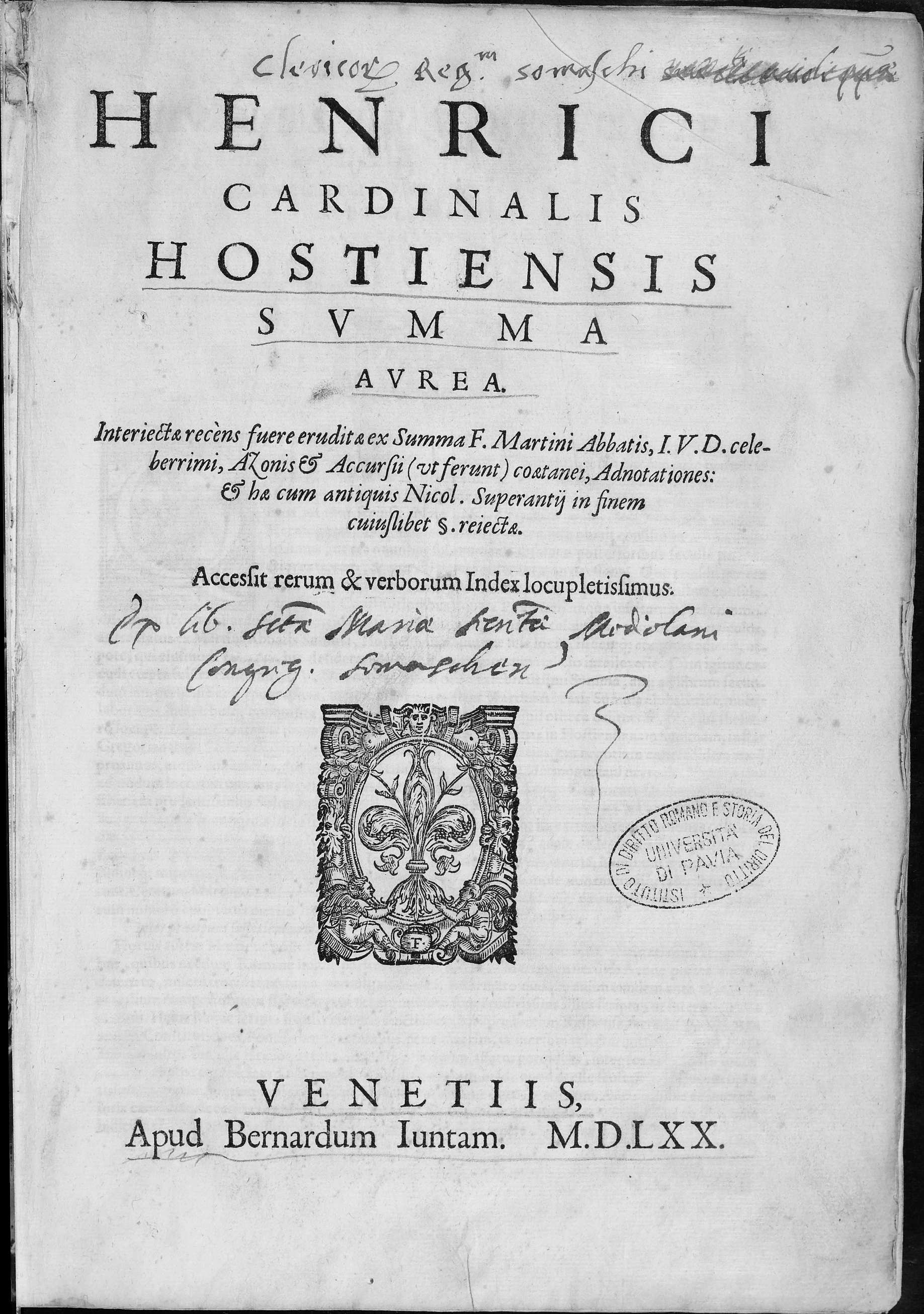
Summa aurea, 1570

As a canonist Hostiensis had a great reputation. His works are:

- Lectura in Decretales Gregorii IX (Strasburg, 1512; Paris, 1512), a work begun at Paris but continued during his whole life;
- Summa super titulis Decretalium (Strasburg, 1512; Cologne, 1612; Venice, 1605), also known as Summa archiepiscopi or Summa aurea; written while he was Archbishop of Embrun, a work on Roman and canon law, which won for its author the title Monarcha juris, lumen lucidissimum Decretorum. One portion of this work, the Summa, sive tractatus de poenitentia et remissionibus was very popular. It was written between 1250 and 1261.
  - Summa aurea (in Latin). Venice: Bernardo Giunta. 1570.
- Lectura in Decretales Innocentii IV, which was never edited.

A work on feudal law has also been attributed to him, but without foundation.

== Hostiensis on papal plenitudo potestatis ==
For Hostiensis, the law as well as all political authority were derived from God. Because of this, all princes “exercised authority by divine mandate.” Civil law was divine because the emperors who created that law were placed in authority by God. Despite this, however, civil law was inferior to canon law.

The reason for this is that the pope’s authority was even closer to the divine than that of secular princes. Because the pope was the vicar of God he acted on God’s authority, from which he (the pope) derived his own authority. Thus, whenever the pope acted de iure he acted as God. Therefore, canon law, since it was promulgated by the pope, was established by God. This is because canon law was based on the Bible, and God had given his vicar, the pope, the authority to interpret that text. Thus, canon law was divine not because it came directly from God, but because of the end it sought (the spiritual well-being of Christians) and because of the dignity of the Pope, from which the canon law emanated.

Hostiensis believed that while the pope should follow positive law he was not bound by it. Thus, the pope could not be tried for any crime, except that of heresy, in which case “the pope could be subject to the 'ecclesia' (the Church)." For any other violation of law, the pope could be judged by no one save God. Further, except in the event that a mortal sin would result, the pope was to be obeyed in everything he commanded, including violations of positive law, since the pope was above that law. The only exception to this was if the pope’s command violated the conscience of the one being commanded, in which case the one being commanded should not obey.

Similarly, Hostiensis believed that the pope could grant exemptions even from divine law ("mandates of the Apostles and rules of the Old Testament"), so long as that exemption did not lead to a mortal sin, violate the faith, subvert the faith, or endanger the salvation of souls. The pope had great authority indeed, he could even "change squares into circles.

According to Hostiensis, the pope was imbued with the authority of the two swords (Lk 22:36-38), interpreted as spiritual and temporal power. The spiritual was superior to the temporal in the following three aspects: “in dignity, for the spirit is greater and more honourable than the body; in time, for it was earlier; and in power, for it not only institutes the temporal power but also has the authority to judge it, while the Pope cannot be judged by any man, except in cases of heresy.” The pope entrusted temporal authority to the emperors but retained the right to reclaim that authority “in virtue of the ‘plenitudo potestatis’ which he possesses as the vicar of Christ.” Indeed, the temporal power of the pope was so complete that Hostiensis considered it a mortal sin for a temporal ruler to disobey the pope in temporal matters.

This view of papal authority in temporal matters also applied to the kingdoms of non-Christians. For Hostiensis, all sovereignty had been taken away from non-Christians and transferred to the faithful when Christ came into the world. “This translation of power was first made to the person of Christ who combined the functions of priesthood and kingship, and this sacerdotal and kingly power was then transferred to the popes.” Non-Christians were thus subject to Christians but could maintain sovereignty over their lands so long as they recognized the church as superior. If non-believers failed to recognize the lordship of the Church, however, sovereignty could be taken away from them by the pope and transferred to Christian rulers.

Hostiensis’ influence lasted well into the seventeenth century. His thought played an especially central role in Spanish theories of empire during the age of discovery. Both Juan Lopez de Palacios Rubios and Fray Matias de Paz, who were recruited by King Ferdinand of Spain in 1512 to help legitimate Spanish title over the New World, based their justifications of Spanish sovereignty over the New World on Hostiensis’ ideas on papal temporal sovereignty.

== In literature ==
He is mentioned in the Paradise (12.82-85) of Dante's Divine Comedy.

== See also ==
- Hierocracy (medieval)
- Plenitudo potestatis

== Notes ==
Catholic Church titles
Preceded by Hugh of St Cher	Cardinal-bishop of Ostia; 1262–1271	Succeeded by Peter of Tarentaise
Preceded by Humbert	Bishop of Embrun; 1250–1261	Succeeded by Melchior
Preceded by Rodolphe II	Bishop of Sisteron; 1244–1250	Succeeded by Humbert Fallavel
