= Juan de Oñate =

16/17th-century Spanish conquistador and colonial governor in New Spain

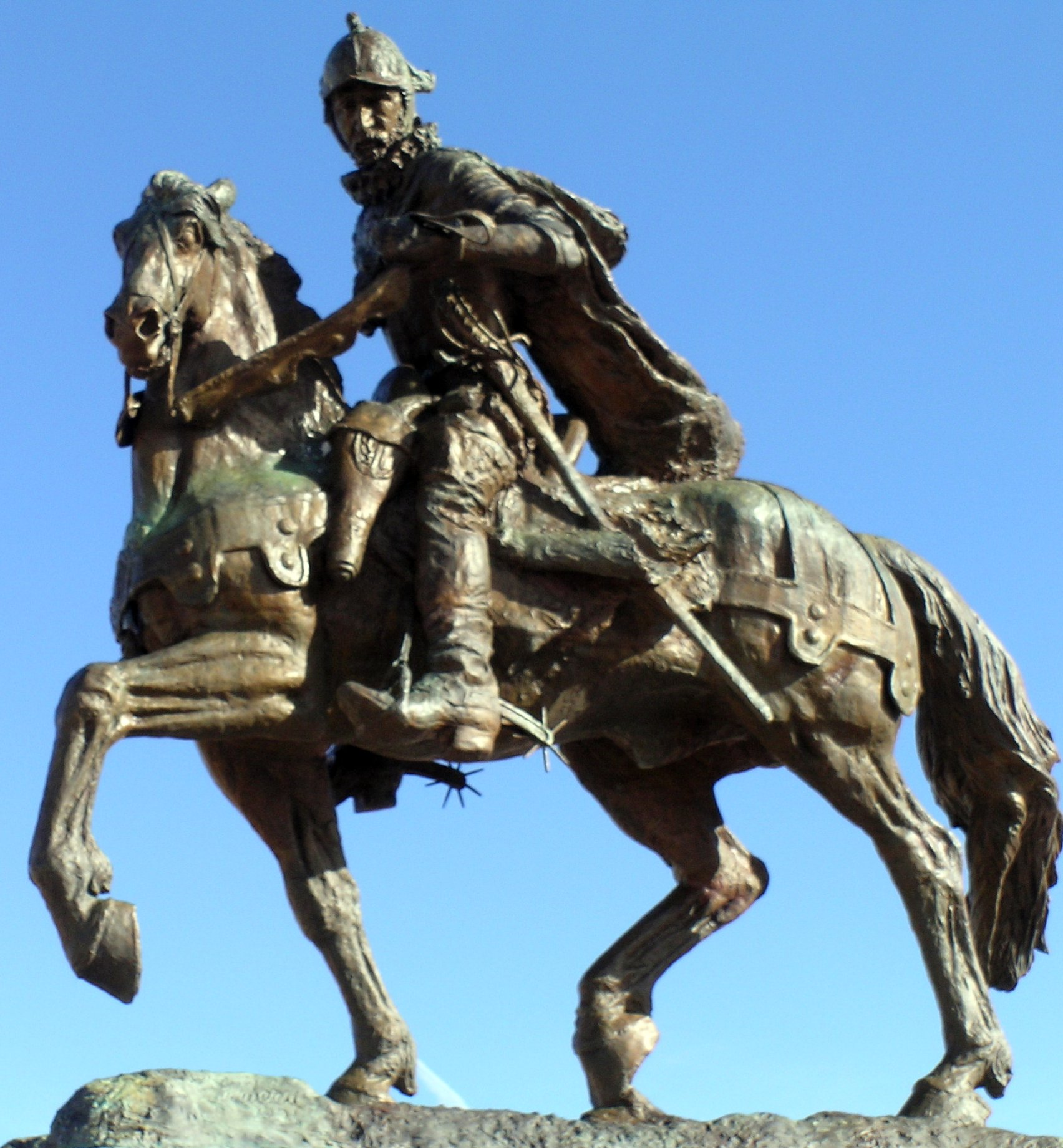
- Equestrian statue of Juan de Oñate, Alcalde, New Mexico

1st Spanish Governor of New Mexico
- In office November 1598 – 18 April 1606
- Succeeded by: Cristóbal de Oñate (son)

Personal details
- Born: 1550 Pánuco, New Spain (now Zacatecas, Mexico)
- Died: June 3, 1626 (aged 75–76) Guadalcanal, Seville, Spain
- Spouse: Isabel de Tolosa Cortés de Moctezuma
- Children: 2
- Parent(s): Cristóbal Narriahondo de Oñate; Catalina Salazar y de la Cadena
- Occupation: Explorer and governor of New Mexico
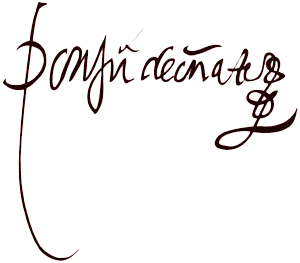
- Signature

Juan de Oñate y Salazar (Spanish pronunciation: [/ˈxwan de‿oˈɲate/] Huan-de-O-nya-te) (1550-1626) was a Spanish conquistador, explorer and viceroy of the province of Santa Fe de Nuevo México in the viceroyalty of New Spain, in the present-day U.S. state of New Mexico. He led early Spanish expeditions to the Great Plains and Lower Colorado River Valley, encountering numerous indigenous tribes in their homelands there. Oñate founded settlements in the province, now in the Southwestern United States.

Oñate is notorious for the 1599 Ácoma Massacre. This series of events transpired after Oñate sent his nephew, Juan de Zaldívar, to ask Acoma Pueblo to submit to the Spanish throne and Catholicism. Accounts of what happened next differ. The majority of accounts include the Spaniards forcefully taking Acoma blankets and food. A fight ensued and many of the Spanish group, including Zaldívar, were killed.

Oñate arrived at Acoma Pueblo on January 21st with an army including cannons and muskets. The Spanish set fire to the Pueblo. Approximately 800–1000 Ácoma were murdered. After this initial attack, on February 12th, Oñate ordered that the right foot be cut off every man over 25.

Today, Oñate remains a controversial figure in New Mexican history: in 1998, the right foot was cut off a statue of the conquistador that stands in Alcalde, New Mexico, in protest of the massacre, and significant controversy arose when a large equestrian statue of Oñate was erected in El Paso, Texas, in 2006. On June 15, 2020, the statue of Oñate in Alcalde, New Mexico was temporarily removed by Rio Arriba County workers at the direction of officials and put into storage. In 2023, The statue was erected again in Española, New Mexico, placed on the grounds of the county annex building.

== Early years ==
Coat of Arms of Juan de Oñate y Salazar

Oñate was born in 1550, at Zacatecas in New Spain (colonial México), to the Spanish-Basque conquistador and silver baron Cristóbal de Oñate, a descendant of the noble house of Haro. Oñate's mother, Doña Catalina Salazar y de la Cadena, had among her ancestors Jewish-origin New Christians who "served in the royal court of Spanish monarchs from the late 1300s to the mid-1500s." She was of Spanish ancestry and descended from conversos, former Jews, on at least several branches of her family tree. Among these converso relatives was her paternal grandfather, the royal physician Doctor Guadalupe de Salazar. Other family members became Christians in the 1390s, around 160 years before Oñate's birth. Her father was Gonzalo de Salazar, leader of several councils that governed New Spain while Hernán Cortés was traveling to Honduras in 1525–26.

Juan de Oñate married Isabel de Tolosa Cortés de Moctezuma, who was the granddaughter of Hernán Cortés, the conqueror of the Mexica, and the great-granddaughter of the Aztec Emperor Moctezuma Xocoyotzin.

They had two children:

- Cristóbal de Oñate who married María Gutiérrez del Castillo who had issue, Juan Pérez de Narriahondo y Castillo.
- María de Oñate who married Vicente de Zaldívar who had issue, Nicolás de Zaldívar y Oñate.

== Governorship and 1598 New Mexico expedition ==
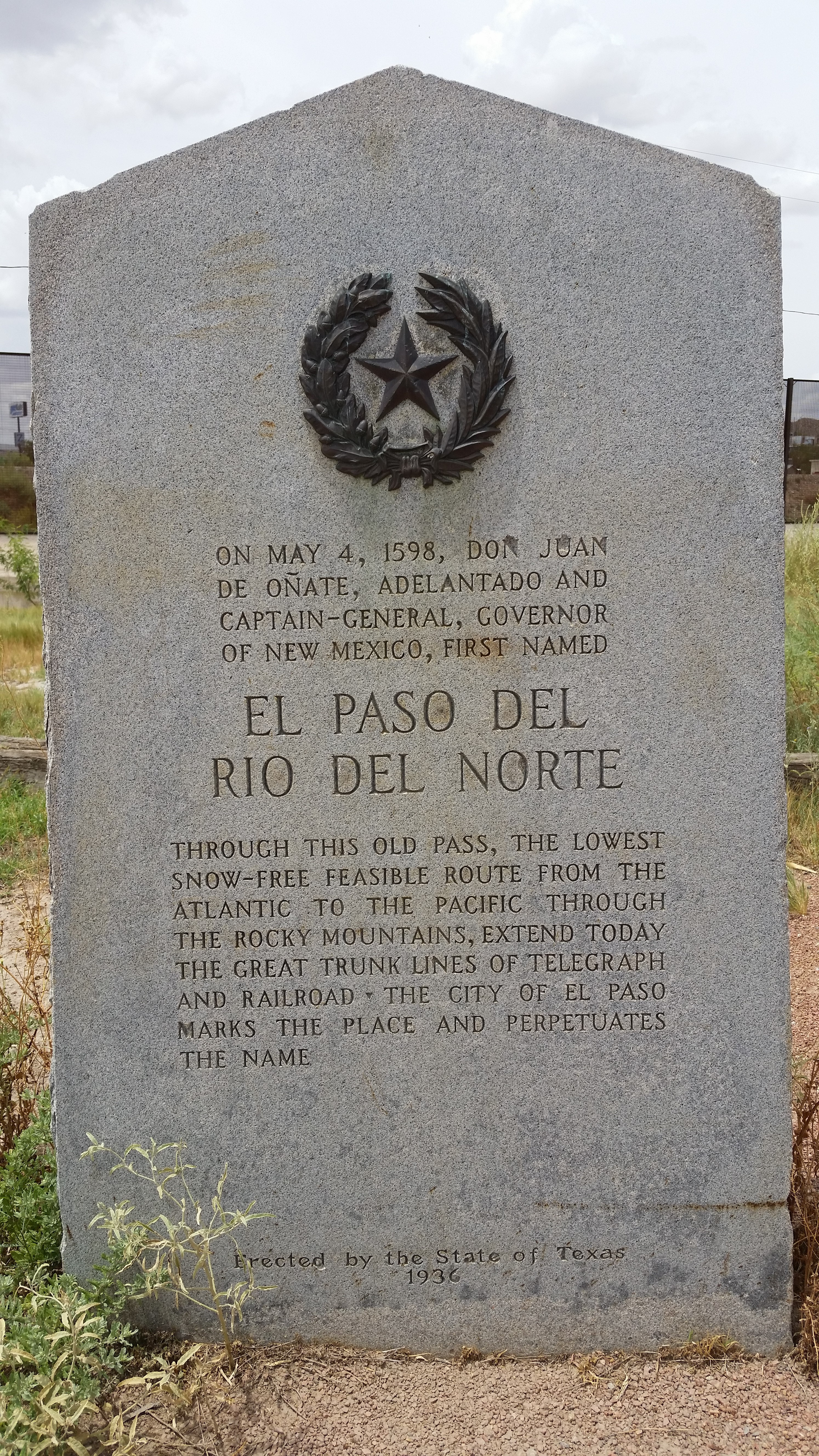
Texas Historical Marker for Don Juan de Oñate and El Paso del Río Norte

In response to a bid by Juan Bautista de Lomas y Colmenares, and subsequently rejected by the King, on September 21, 1595 Philip II's Viceroy Luís de Velasco selected Oñate from two other candidates to organize the resources of the newly acquired territory.

The agreement with Viceroy Velasco tasked Oñate with two goals; the better-known aim was to explore and colonize the unknown lands annexed into the New Kingdom of León y Castilla (present day New Mexico) and the Viceroyalty of New Spain. His second goal was to capture Capt. Francisco Leyva de Bonilla (a traitor to the crown known to be in the region) as he already was transporting other criminals. His stated objective otherwise was to spread Catholicism by establishing new missions in Nuevo México. Oñate is credited with founding the Province of Santa Fe de Nuevo México, and was the province's first colonial governor, acting from 1598 to 1610. He held his colonial government at Ohkay Owingeh, and renamed the pueblo there 'San Juan de los Caballeros'.

In late 1595, the Viceroy Gaspar de Zúñiga followed his predecessor's advice, and in the summer of 1596 delayed Oñate's expedition in order to review the terms of the original agreement, signed before the previous Viceroy had left office. In March 1598, Oñate's expedition moved out and forded the Rio Grande (Río del Norte) south of present-day El Paso and Ciudad Juárez in late April.

On the Catholic calendar day of Ascension, April 30, 1598, the exploration party assembled on the south bank of the Rio Grande. In an Ascension Day ceremony, Oñate led the party in prayer, as he claimed all of the territory across the river for the Spanish Empire. Oñate's original terms would have made this land a separate viceroyalty to the crown in New Spain; this move failed to stand after de Zúñiga reviewed the agreement.

All summer, Oñate's expedition party followed the middle Rio Grande Valley to present-day northern New Mexico, where he engaged with Pueblo Indians. Gaspar Pérez de Villagrá, a captain of the expedition, chronicled Oñate's conquest of New Mexico's indigenous peoples in his epic poem Historia de la Nueva México.

Oñate granted land to colonists on the expedition, and empowered them to demand tribute from Native Americans.

=== Ácoma Massacre ===
In October 1598, a skirmish erupted when a squad of Oñate's men stopped to trade for food supplies at the Acoma Pueblo. The Ácoma themselves needed their stored food to survive the coming winter. The Ácoma resisted and 11 Spaniards were ambushed and killed, including Oñate's nephew, Juan de Zaldívar. In January 1599, Oñate condemned the conflict as an insurrection and ordered the pueblo destroyed, a mandate carried out by Juan de Zaldívar's brother, Vicente de Zaldívar, in an offensive known as the Ácoma Massacre. An estimated 800–1,000 Ácoma died in the siege of the pueblo. Much later, when King Philip III of Spain heard the news of the massacre, and the punishments, Oñate was banished from New Mexico for his cruelty to the natives, and exiled from Mexico for five years, convicted by the Spanish government of using "excessive force" against the Acoma people. Oñate later returned to Spain to live out the remainder of his life.

Of the 500 or so survivors, at a trial at Ohkay Owingeh, Oñate sentenced all men and women older than 12 to twenty years of forced "personal servitude". In addition, men older than 25 (24 individuals) were to have a foot amputated. According to recent research, there is no evidence of this happening and that, at most, the prisoners lost some toes. This latter theory makes sense, for losing toes rather than a whole foot left the prisoners useful as servants. In Onate's personal journal, he specifically refers to the punishment of the Acoma warriors as cutting off "las puntas del pie" (the points of the foot, the toes).

== Great Plains expedition ==
In 1601, Oñate undertook a large expedition east to the Great Plains region of central North America. The expedition party included 130 Spanish soldiers and 12 Franciscan priests—similar to the expedition of the Spanish conquest of the Aztec Empire—and a retinue of 130 American Indian soldiers and servants. The expedition possessed 350 horses and mules. Oñate journeyed across the plains eastward from New Mexico in a renewed search for Quivira, the fabled "city of gold." As had the earlier Coronado Expedition in the 1540s, Oñate encountered Apaches in the Texas Panhandle region.

Oñate proceeded eastward, following the Canadian River into the modern state of Oklahoma. Leaving the river behind in a sandy area where his ox carts could not pass, he went across country, and the land became greener, with more water and groves of Black walnut (Juglans nigra) and bur oak (Quercus macrocarpa) trees.

=== Escanjaque people ===
Jusepe probably led the Oñate party on the same route he had taken on the Umana and Leyba expedition six years earlier. They found an encampment of native people that Oñate called the Escanjaques. He estimated the population at more than 5,000 living in 600 houses. The Escanjaques lived in round houses as large as 90 feet (27 m) in diameter and covered with tanned buffalo robes. They were hunters, according to Oñate, depending upon the buffalo for their subsistence and planting no crops.

The Escanjaques told Oñate that Etzanoa, a large city of their enemies the Rayado Indians, was located only about 20 miles (30 km) away. It seems possible that the Escanjaques had gathered together in large numbers either out of fear of the Rayados or to undertake a war against them. They attempted to enlist the assistance of the Spanish and their firearms, alleging that the Rayados were responsible for the deaths of Humana and Leyva a few years before.

The Escanjaques guided Oñate to a large river a few miles away and he became the first European to describe the tallgrass prairie. He spoke of fertile land, much better than that through which he had previously passed, and pastures "so good that in many places the grass was high enough to conceal a horse." He found and tasted a fruit of good flavor, possibly the pawpaw.

=== Rayado people ===
Near the river, Oñate's expedition party and their numerous Escanjaque guides saw three or four hundred Rayados on a hill. The Rayados advanced, throwing dirt into the air as a sign that they were ready for war. Oñate quickly indicated that he did not wish to fight and made peace with this group of Rayados, who proved to be friendly and generous. Oñate liked the Rayados more than he did the Escanjaques. They were "united, peaceful, and settled." They showed deference to their chief, named Caratax, whom Oñate detained as a guide and hostage, although "treating him well."

Caratax led Oñate and the Escanjaques across the river to Etzanoa, a settlement on the eastern bank, one or two miles from the river. The settlement was deserted, the inhabitants having fled. It contained "about twelve hundred houses, all established along the bank of another good-sized river which flowed into the large one [the Arkansas].... the settlement of the Rayados seemed typical of those seen by Coronado in Quivira in the 1540s. The homesteads were dispersed; the houses round, thatched with grass, large enough to sleep ten persons each, and surrounded by large granaries to store the corn, beans, and squash they grew in their fields." With difficulty Oñate restrained the Escanjaques from looting the town and sent them home.

The next day the Oñate expedition proceeded onward for another 8 miles (13 km) through heavily populated territory, although without seeing many Rayados. At this point, the Spaniards' courage deserted them. There were obviously many Rayados nearby and soon Oñate's men were warned that the Rayados were assembling an army. Discretion seemed the better part of valor. Oñate estimated that three hundred Spanish soldiers would be needed to confront the Rayados, and he turned his soldiers around to return to New Mexico.

=== Return to Nuevo México ===
Oñate had worried about the Rayados hurting or attacking his expedition party, but it was instead the Escanjaques who repelled his men on their return to New Mexico. Oñate described a pitched battle with 1,500 Escanjaques, probably an exaggeration, but many Spaniards were wounded and many natives killed. After more than two hours of fighting, Oñate himself retired from the battlefield. The hostage Rayado chief Caratax was freed by a raid on Oñate and Oñate freed several women captives, but he retained several boys at the request of the Spanish priests for instruction in the Catholic faith. The attack may have arisen from Oñate's kidnapping of Caratax and the women and children.

Oñate and his men returned to San Juan de los Caballeros, arriving there on November 24, 1601 without any further incidents of note.

=== Contemporary studies ===
The path of Oñate's expedition and the identity of the Escanjaques and the Rayados are much debated. Most authorities believe his route led down the Canadian River from Texas to Oklahoma, cross-country to the Salt Fork, where he found the Escanjaque encampment, and then to the Arkansas River and its tributary, the Walnut River at Arkansas City, Kansas where the Rayado settlement was located. Archaeological evidence favors the Walnut River site. A minority view would be that the Escanjaque encampment was on the Ninnescah River and the Rayado village was on the site of present-day Wichita, Kansas.

Authorities have speculated that the Escanjaques were Apache, Tonkawa, Jumano, Quapaw, Kaw, or other tribes. Most likely they were Caddoan and spoke a Wichita dialect. We can be virtually certain that the Rayados were Caddoan Wichitas. Their grass houses, dispersed mode of settlement, a chief named Catarax (Caddi was a Wichita title for a chief), the description of their granaries, and their location all are in accord with Coronado's earlier description of the Quivirans. However, they were probably not the same people Coronado met. Coronado found Quivira 120 miles north of Oñate's Rayados. The Rayados spoke of large settlements called Tancoa—perhaps the real name of Quivira—in an area to the north. Thus, the Rayados were related culturally and linguistically to the Quivirans but not part of the same political entity. The Wichita at this time were not unified, but rather a large number of related tribes scattered over most of Kansas and Oklahoma, so it is not implausible that the Rayados and Escanjaques spoke the same language, but were nevertheless enemies.

== Colorado River expedition ==
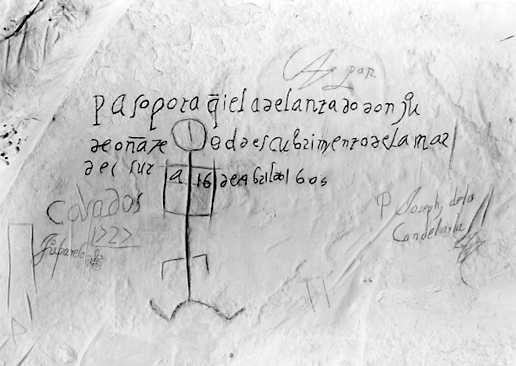
Oñate's 1605 "signature graffiti" on Inscription Rock, in El Morro National Monument

Oñate's last major expedition went to the west, from New Mexico to the lower valley of the Colorado River. The party of about three dozen men set out from the Rio Grande valley in October 1604. They traveled by way of Zuñi, the Hopi pueblos, and the Bill Williams River to the Colorado River, and descended that river to its mouth in the Gulf of California in January 1605, before returning along the same route to New Mexico. The evident purpose of the expedition was to locate a port by which New Mexico could be supplied, as an alternative to the laborious overland route from New Spain.

The expedition to the lower Colorado River was important as the only recorded European incursion into that region between the expeditions of Hernando de Alarcón and Melchior Díaz in 1540, and the visits of Eusebio Francisco Kino beginning in 1701. The explorers did not see evidence of prehistoric Lake Cahuilla, which must have arisen shortly afterwards in the Salton Sink.

They mistakenly thought that the Gulf of California continued indefinitely to the northwest, giving rise to a belief that was common in the 17th century that the western coasts of an Island of California were what was seen by sailing expeditions in the Pacific.

Native groups observed living on the lower Colorado River, were, from north to south, the Amacava (Mohave), Bahacecha, Osera (Pima), at the confluence of the Gila River with the Colorado, in a location later occupied by the Quechan, Alebdoma.

Seen by Oñate below the Gila junction but subsequently reported upstream from there, in the area where Oñate had encountered the Coguana, or Kahwans, Agalle, and Agalecquamaya, or Halyikwamai, and the Cocopah.

Concerning areas that the explorers had not observed directly, they gave fantastic reports about races of human and areas said to be rich in gold, silver, and pearls.

== Later life ==
In 1606, Oñate was recalled to Mexico City for a hearing regarding his conduct. After finishing plans for the founding of the town of Santa Fe, he resigned his post and was tried and convicted of cruelty to both natives and colonists. He was banished from New Mexico for life and exiled from Mexico City for five years.

Eventually Oñate went to Spain, where the king appointed him head of all mining inspectors in Spain. He died in Spain in 1626. He is sometimes referred to as "the Last Conquistador."

== Legacy ==
Oñate is honored by some as an explorer but vilified by others for his cruelty to the Keres people of Acoma Pueblo.

=== New Mexico ===
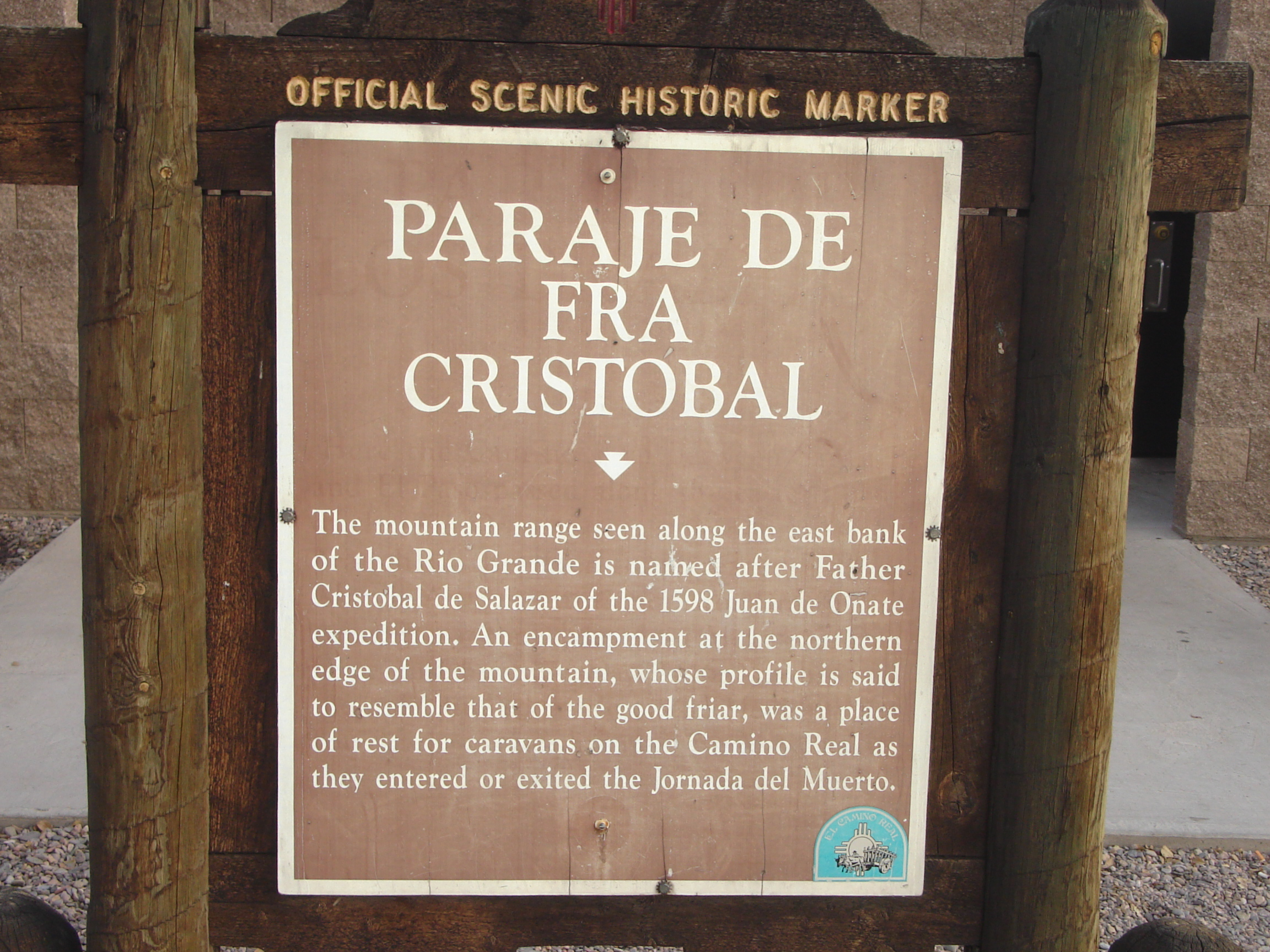
Historic Marker at "Paraje de Fra Cristobal," Rio Grande crossing

Oñate Elementary School in Albuquerque, New Mexico was named after Juan de Oñate and is currently the only public school in New Mexico carrying Oñate's namesake. Oñate High School in Las Cruces, New Mexico was also named after Juan de Oñate, but in 2021, the high school's name was changed to Organ Mountain High School. Juan de Oñate Elementary School in Gallup, New Mexico, was merged with another school to become Del Norte Elementary School in 2017. The street that runs through the historic central business district of Española, New Mexico, is named Paseo de Oñate.

==== Alcalde statue ====
In the Northern Rio Grande National Heritage Center (until 2017 the Oñate Monument and Visitor Center) in Alcalde, New Mexico, is a 1991 bronze statue dedicated to Oñate. In 1998, New Mexico celebrated the 400th anniversary of his arrival. Shortly before (December 29, 1997), and the close dates are no coincidence, unknown perpetrator(s) cut off the statue's right foot and left a note saying, "Fair is fair." Sculptor Reynaldo Rivera recast the foot, but a seam is still visible. Some commentators suggested leaving the statue maimed as a symbolic reminder of the foot-amputating Acoma Massacre. A local filmmaker, Chris Eyre, was contacted by one of the two perpetrators, saying "I'm back on the scene to show people that Oñate and his supporters must be shamed." The sculptor responded that chopping feet "was the nature of discipline of 400 years ago."

In 2017, the statue's left foot was painted red and the words "Remember 1680" (year of the Pueblo Revolt) were written with paint on the monument's base.

The county of Rio Arriba temporarily removed the statue on June 15, 2020, which followed wider efforts to remove controversial statues across the United States. It is unknown whether the statue will be returned to its place in the future, with a statement from Rio Arriba County Commission stating: "Rio Arriba County residents need to understand that a final policy decision has not been made about the Oñate statue other than its removal today to protect it from damage or destruction. The County Commission welcomes a respectful and civil discussion from its residents about the future of the Oñate statue."

==== 1998 400th anniversary of arrival ====
A memorial for Oñate was created for the New Mexico Cuarto Centenario (the 400th anniversary of Oñate's 1598 settlement). The memorial was meant to be a tri-cultural collaboration (Hispanic, Anglo, and Tewa Pueblo Native American), with Reynaldo "Sonny" Rivera, Betty Sabo, and Nora Naranjo Morse. Because of the controversy surrounding Oñate, two separate memorials and perspectives were created. Rivera and Sabo did a series of bronze statues of Oñate leading the first group of Spanish settlers into New Mexico titled "La Jornada," while Naranjo-Morse created an abstract land art from the desert itself of a large dirt spiral representing the Native American perspective titled "Numbe Whageh" (Tewa interpretation: Our Center Place). It is located at the Albuquerque Museum.

==== 2014 400th anniversary of exile ====
In 1614, Oñate was exiled from what is now New Mexico and charged with mismanagement and excessive cruelty, especially at the Acoma massacre in Acoma. In 1599, after killing 500 warriors and 300 women and children, he ordered the right foot be chopped off of all surviving 24 Acoma warriors. Men and boys between the ages of 12 and 25 were also enslaved for 20 years, along with all of the women and girls above the age of 12. When King Phillip of Spain heard the news from Acoma, Oñate was brought up on 30 charges of mismanagement and excessive cruelty. He was found guilty of cruelty, immorality, and false reporting and was exiled to Spain to live out the remainder of his life. 2014 marked the 400th anniversary of Juan de Oñate's exile from New Mexico. Despite his atrocities, Oñate is still celebrated today at the Española Valley Fiestas.

=== Texas ===
In 1997 the City of El Paso hired the sculptor John Sherrill Houser to create an equestrian statue of the conquistador. In reaction to protests, two city council members retracted their support for the project. The $2,000,000 statue took nearly nine years to build and was kept in the sculptor's Mexico City warehouse. The statue was completed in early 2006, transported in pieces on flatbed trailers to El Paso during the summer, and installed in October. The controversy over the statue prior to its installation was the subject of the documentary film The Last Conquistador, presented in 2008 as part of PBS's P.O.V. television series.

The City of El Paso unveiled the eighteen ton, 34-foot-tall (10 m) statue in a ceremony on April 21, 2007. Oñate is mounted atop his Andalusian horse and holds the La Toma declaration in his right hand. It is one of the tallest statues in the United States. According to Houser, it is the largest and heaviest bronze equestrian statue in the world.

The statue precipitated controversy due to Oñate being tried and convicted for many crimes including brutality against the Ácoma Pueblo tribe, and was protested by groups such as the Ácoma tribe during the development of the project as well as at the inauguration. To defuse some of the controversy, the statue was renamed "The Equestrian". The statue was vandalized in June 2020.

== See also ==
- Pueblo peoples
- Pueblo Revolt
- Spanish missions in New Mexico
- Colonial New Mexico
- Gaspar Castaño de Sosa
