= Gaspar Pérez de Villagrá =

Spanish explorer

Gaspar Pérez de Villagrá

Gaspar Pérez de Villagrá (1555–1620) was a captain and legal officer (procurador general) in the Juan de Oñate expedition that first colonized Santa Fe de Nuevo México in 1598. Between 1601 and 1603, he served as the Alcalde mayor of the Guanacevi mines in what is now the Mexican state of Durango. He is better known for his authorship of Historia de la Nueva México, published in 1610.

He was born in Puebla de Los Angeles, New Spain. His father, Hernan Peréz de Villagrá, was a Spaniard while his mother's identity remains unknown. He received the opportunity to study in Europe and received a bachelor of letters degree from the University of Salamanca in the early 1570s, where he studied Greek and Roman historians and rhetoricians after which he returned to New Spain.

== Early life ==
Known not only as one of the early chroniclers of the conquest of the Americas but as one of the forerunners of Latino literature in the United States for his epic poem Historia de la Nueva México, Gaspar Pérez de Villagrá was born in Puebla de Los Ángeles (near México city) in 1555. His father, Hernan Pérez de Villagrá, was a Spaniard from Campos de Villagrán. Although Gaspar Pérez de Villagrá was Criollo by birth, his generation of Spaniards born in the New World did not feel any less Spanish than those born in Spain. Little is known about his youth or his early adulthood. He was, however, part of the small group of privileged Criollos who studied in Spain, obtaining his degree from the University of Salamanca. It is not known when Pérez de Villagrá returned to New Spain, but it must have been prior to his association with Don Juan de Oñate, in 1596. He was made captain and legal officer of Oñate's expedition into New Mexico.

== Military career ==
In 1579 an Indian captive, held in Santa Bárbara, spoke of big cities beyond the Chihuahua desert. The news reached the Franciscan Friar Agustín Rodríguez, who conveyed the news to the viceroy. This was the beginning of a series of expeditions that would lead to Oñate's request to conquer and govern New México in 1595. His request for the expedition was approved in 1598 by the viceroy.

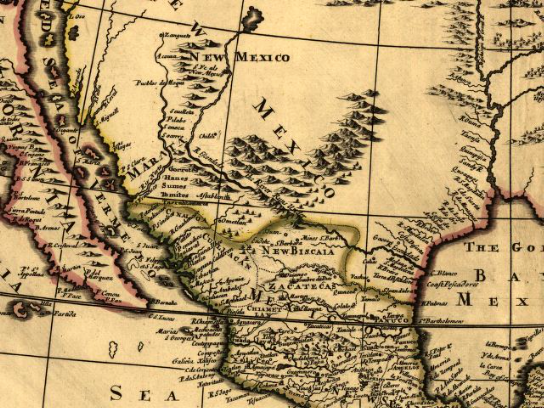
Philip Lea, North America divided into its three principal parts, 1685, detail including “Rio Escondado” flowing from the north, in “New Mexico,” southeast to the Gulf of Mexico

Oñate's expedition in 1598 was perhaps the best prepared, and his purpose was not only to capture the riches but also to establish a colony with his important force of settlers. Villagrá joined Captain de Oñate's expedition to New Mexico in 1596 and was an eyewitness and participant in the pacification and colonization of the Pueblo Indians in the New Mexican territory.

Oñate's expedition, comprising about 400 participants, initiated its journey from the state of Zacatecas in northern México. After various impediments, mostly of a political nature, the expedition was able to depart on January 26, 1598, and work its way through mountainous terrain, deserts, and raging rivers. After many hair raising and near-death adventures, the expedition was finally able to cross the turbulent and rapidly flowing waters of the Rio Grande River at what today is El Paso, Texas, in July 1598. In an act of thanksgiving, Oñate ordered a Mass to be said, after which the men and women relaxed by watching a play written by one of the soldiers for the occasion; this was the first Western European drama performed in the United States. These secular dramas, such as Los Moros y Cristianos, were performed in part as a strategy to demonstrate the mighty power of the Spanish Empire to the astounded Indian masses who marvelled at the deafening sound of the firing cannons.

The expedition established its headquarters in San Juan, and from there Oñate sent Gaspar Pérez de Villagrá and his other captains into expeditions in search of towns, riches, and resources. The first Spanish settlers in New Mexico moved from San Juan in 1598, to the river valley settlement of San Gabriel in 1601, then to a spot twenty miles south at the foot of the Sangre de Cristo mountain range, named Santa Fe in 1607. The expeditions found nothing and the settlers he had brought became discontent with the quest, some deciding to leave. As a demonstration of disapproval, Oñate ordered the execution of some of the settlers who led the dissent.

It is rumored that Villagrá, of athletic build and hard spirits, was left alone with his dog and his horse after an eventful persecution, and went through the desert in search of Oñate. After several days, hungry and thirsty, he killed his faithful dog and drank his blood. He was almost dead when he was found by soldiers. Later he distinguished himself in making high population of Acoma, the stronghold of warlike Indians, and made a formidable leap across a deep abyss where his companions had put a log that served as a bridge.

Oñate was also known for his brutality toward the Indians, and soon the Pueblo, who were subjugated, mistreated, their food stolen, and their lands taken away in the name of the king of Spain, began to rebel. Soon thereafter, in 1599, the Acoma Massacre transpired, where hundreds of the Native American population were indiscriminately slain and driven from their homes, marking the defeat of the Pueblo and the triumph of the Spanish colonizers. Pérez de Villagrá's Historia de la Nueva México is a literary masterpiece in which he is also one of the protagonists who help the pacification and the political and social organization of the new territory, but most importantly recounts this important moment in American history. In 1600, Oñate sent his trusted captain with an escort back to Mexico to seek more supplies and men. When the party was ready to return to New Mexico, the viceroy removed Villagrá from command and appointed another in his place. Angry, Villagrá took sanctuary in a church to avoid returning—in an inferior position—to Oñate's colony. In 1605, he left for Spain, hoping to persuade the king to grant him some royal favor for his service in New Mexico. Five years later, the captain was probably living in the university town of Alcalá de Henares east of Madrid, [Spain], where his long poem Historia de la Nueva Mexico was published as a book. It covered the first year of Oñate's settlement.

== Later career ==
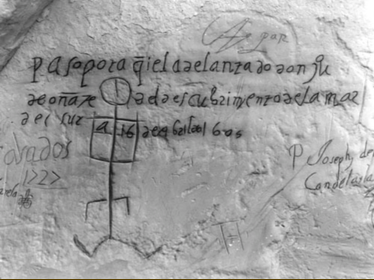
Oñate's inscription on Inscription Rock: "Passed by here the Governor Don Juan de Oñate from the discovery of the Sea of the South on the 26th of April 1605”

After the expedition ended, a group of colonists traveled to Spain and charged Oñate with various acts of tyranny and succeeded in having him deposed in 1607. In the aftermath of the expedition, Villagrá is believed to have served as a major from 1601-1603, in Guanacevi and Nuestra Señora de Alancón Nueva Vizcaya, before returning to Spain in 1605. While in Spain it is believed that he followed the court from Madrid to Valladolid in 1605 and that later he established himself in Alcalá de Henares, where his work Historia de la Nueva México was published in 1610. It was Pérez de Villagrá's intention that his epic poem constitute a plea to King Phillip III for a position in the New World. The king, however, did not hear his petitions, because in 1614 Pérez de Villagrá was convicted in absentia of the death of two deserters from the Juan de Oñate expedition, and he was banished for six years from New Mexico and two years from the viceregal court in New Spain. Pérez de Villagrá finally succeeded in his pleas, and in 1620 he was appointed mayor of Zapotitlan in Guatemala. En route to his appointment, Villagrá died on board a ship headed back to the Americas and he was buried at sea.

== Historia de la Nueva Mexico ==
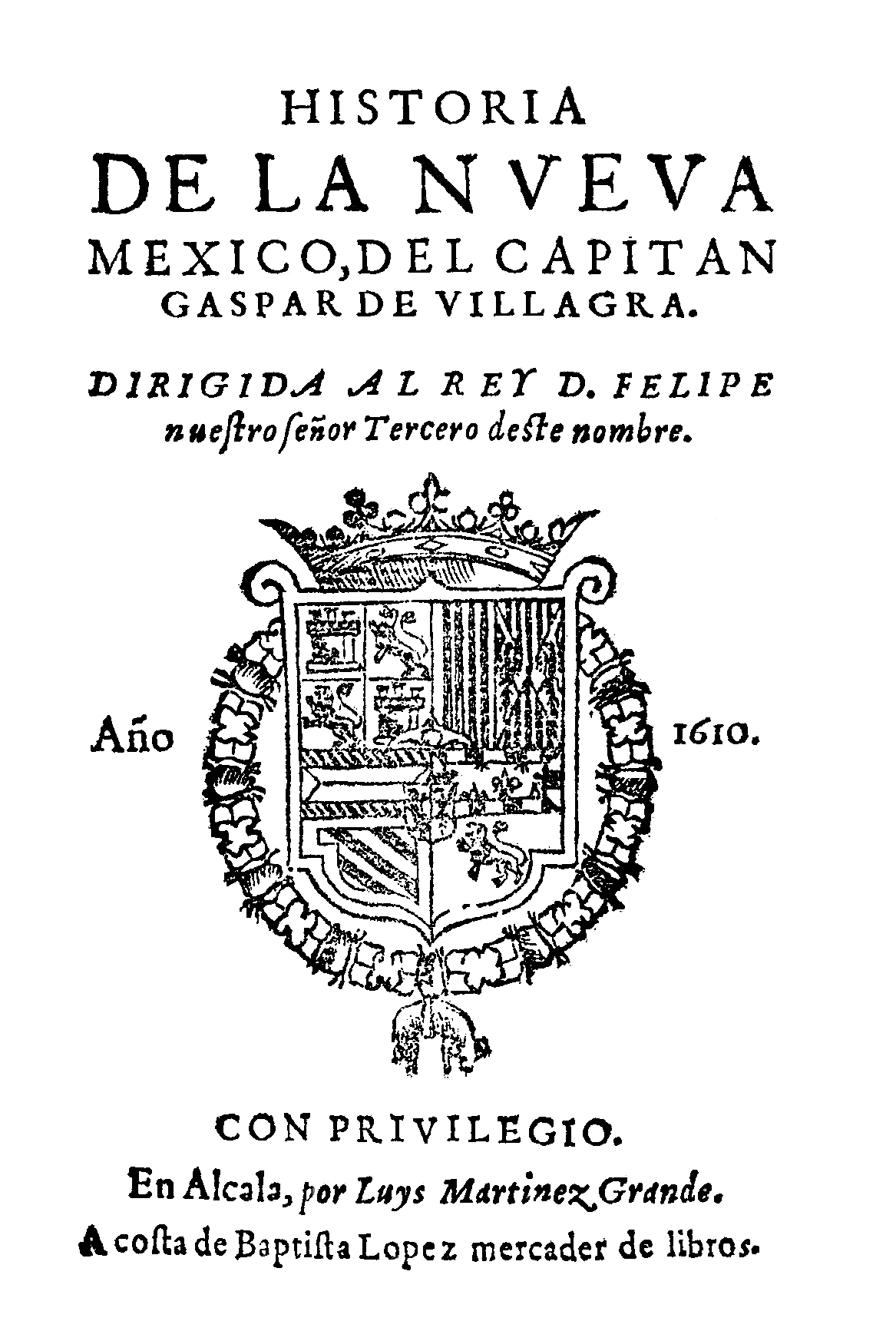
"Historia de la Nueva Mexico", cover

In 1610, Villagrá published his first literary work, Historia de la Nueva México, an epic poem that details the events of the Oñate Expedition in New Mexico, beginning with its march from Mexico City in 1596 and concluding with the Spaniard's attack on the Acoma Pueblo in 1599. Addressed to King Philip III of Spain, the poem is an apologetical piece of literature, entailing all the meritorious works performed by the Spaniards throughout the expedition; this aspect has made categorizing the poem as a historical document somewhat difficult because of its partiality. The poem is believed to be America's first epic poem and is one of the earliest pieces of colonial literature ever produced, even preceding John Smith's General History of Virginia of 1624.

The work was characterized by its use of form, style and punctuation. It consists of 11,891 unrhymed hendecasyllabic lines and separated into 34 cantos. Villagrá incorporates a classical style, modeling the poem after Virgil's Aeneid, but also borrows elements from previous New World epics like Bernal Verdaderas's use of glorification to express Spanish dominance in his poem Historia de la Conquista de la España. Even in punctuation, Villagrá invokes an archaic use of the comma to elevate the language, rendering long sentences with brief pauses in between. An excerpt from the poem translated to English follows:

I sing of arms and the heroic man
The being, courage, care, and high emprise
Of him whose unconquered patience
Though cast upon a sea of cares,
In spite of envy slanderous,
In raising to new heights the feats, the deeds

Of those brave Spaniards '

The first edition of the poem was produced in an octavo text, consisting of 287 leaves of verse. The poem gained little notoriety and very few copies of the original exist today. In 1900, a facsimile reprint was published by the Museo Nacional de México; however, because the text was in Spanish, little academic attention was paid to it. In 1933 a translated, English version was produced by Gilberto Espinosa; since then the reputation of the poem has shifted and more admiration is paid to Villagrá's efforts, style, and historical contents. Historia de la Nueva México is now considered a valued part of colonial literature.

== Later literary works ==
After he participated in the judgment of the people of Acoma, Villagrá wrote a second book, now rare: El Capitán Gaspar de Villagrá para justificarse de las muertes, justicias y castigos que el adelantado don Juan de Oñate dizen que hizo en la Nuevo México (Madrid, 1612). When translated, the title of his second literary work reads: Captain Gaspar de Villagrá to Justify the Deaths, Justices and Punishments that they say the Adelantado Don Juan de Oñate did in New Mexico, which clarifies his participation in the events that led to his expeditions many recriminations and strife. Information regarding this work remains elusive.

== Criticism ==
There are two forms of criticism that center around Historia de la Nueva México. The first form criticizes Villagrá's attempt to assimilate history with poetic aestheticism since he is restricted as an artist by the historical contents of the poem. Villagrá's limits himself in artistic form because he still must present the historical material chronologically and accurately; this format leaves little leeway for Gaspar to be creative. While his is trying to develop a literary work that can be compared with Homer and Virgil, the contents of the poem leaves him grounded to the facts. As historian Miguel Encinias suggests, "Villagrá's poem contains practically nothing that may be considered novelistic or fantastic." Villagrá envisions his work becoming a masterpiece, but ultimately fails to meet his expectations because of the conflict with its form.

The second form of criticism finds Villagrá's overuse of classical and literary elements stifling and redundant. Encinias notes "the poem is overly filled, with poetic comparisons" and calls his use of the comma "burdensome excess." Villagrá's attempts to associate the people of the Oñate expedition with classical characters of Greek and Roman mythology becomes absurd by the overabundance of connotations he develops between them. This absurdity is further exacerbated by the abundance of commas he uses to create lengthy sentences. While the commas create momentary pauses of reflection, they hamper the pace of the poem, making it appear longer than it already is.

Some critics have considered the Historia to be an advance to what would later become the historical novels of the 19th-century Europe, but within the poetic tradition of the Renaissance. Although Pérez de Villagrá was in Spain at the same time that Cervantes published Don Quixote, it is not known if the authors had knowledge of each other's works.

In recent years – and especially since the publication by the University of New Mexico Press of the critical edition of Historia de la Nueva México in 1992 – there has been an attempt to place Pérez de Villagrá as one of the foundational figures in the Latino literary tradition. He is untrustworthy when it comes to historical and chronological events, his depiction of the aboriginal population has been criticized as paternalistic, and as a poet Pérez de Villagrá can be uninspiring and repetitive. Still, his work announces some of the leitmotifs that would define the tradition for future generations, in particular from the late 19th century onward.
