= Equestrian statue of Juan de Oñate =

Statue owned by Rio Arriba County, New Mexico, U.S.

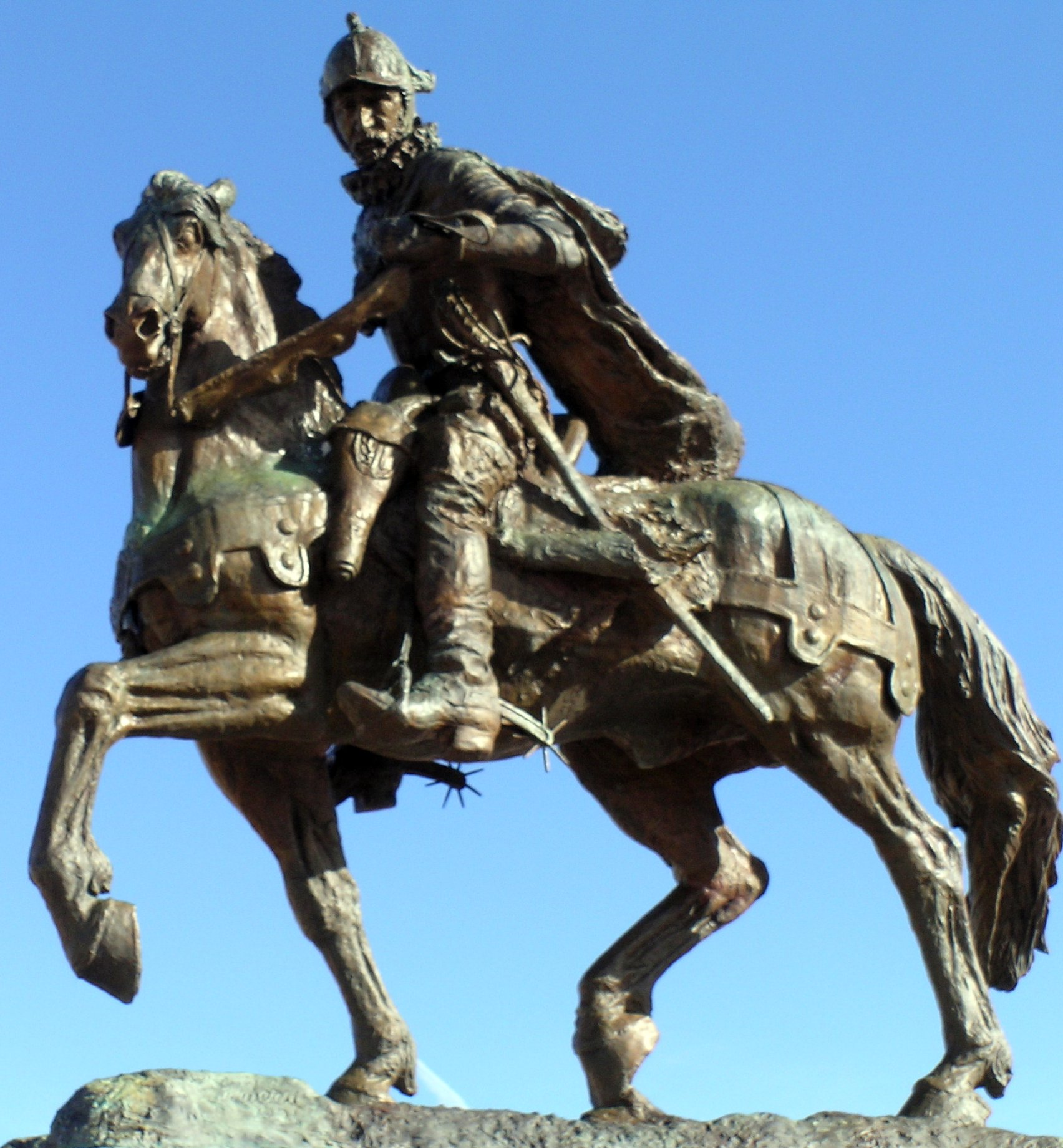
- Part of the installation in 2006
- Artist: Reynaldo Rivera
- Year: 1994
- Medium: Bronze
- Subject: Juan de Oñate
- Condition: In storage
- Location: 36°06′21″N 106°01′55″W
- Owner: County of Rio Arriba

An equestrian statue of Juan de Oñate formerly stood in Alcalde, New Mexico, in the United States. Installed as part of a project to honor Hispanic culture, the monument was removed in June 2020 amid the George Floyd protests. It was situated outside the Northern Rio Grande National Heritage Center (until 2017 the Oñate Monument and Visitor Center) in Alcalde from 1994 to 2020.

== Description ==
The 12-foot (3.7 m) statue, cast in bronze by Reynaldo Rivera, was erected in 1994.

== History ==
The right foot of the statue was cut off on December 29, 1997, shortly before commemorations for the 400th anniversary, in 1998, of Oñate's arrival in New Mexico. A note was left at the scene that said "Fair is fair." The foot was recast. Some commentators suggested leaving the statue maimed as a symbolic reminder of the foot-amputating Acoma Massacre. A local filmmaker, Chris Eyre, was contacted by one of the two perpetrators, who said, "I'm back on the scene to show people that Oñate and his supporters must be shamed." The sculptor responded that chopping feet "was the nature of discipline of 400 years ago".

In 2017 the statue's left foot was painted red, and the words "Remember 1680" (year of the Pueblo Revolt) were written with paint on the monument's base.

The county of Rio Arriba removed the statue on June 15, 2020. In 2023, The statue was moved to Española, New Mexico. During a rally on September 28, 2023 celebrating the postponement of the installation, Jacob Johns who was participating in a prayer ceremony was shot. The suspected 23-year-old shooter Ryan Martinez, who had been trying to access the pedestal, fled by car but was taken into custody.

Initially charged with attempted first-degree murder, aggravated assault with a deadly weapon and reckless driving with firearm- and hate-crime-related sentencing enhancements, Martinez took a no contest plea deal that substituted an aggravated battery charge for the attempted murder charge and dropped the hate crime extension, resulting in a sentence of four years imprisonment in addition to time served.

== See also ==
- Statue of Juan de Oñate (Albuquerque, New Mexico) – statue of Oñate removed in June 2020
- List of monuments and memorials removed during the George Floyd protests
