= Pánuco, Zacatecas =

Pánuco
- City & municipal seat
- Location in Mexico Pánuco (Mexico)
- Coordinates: 22°31′24″N 102°19′21″W
- Country: Mexico
- State: Zacatecas
- Municipality: Pánuco
- Founded: 1 November 1548
- Elevation: 2,292 m (7,520 ft)

Population (2020)
  - Total: 1,177
- Area code: 846
- Website: www.panuco.gob.mx

Pánuco (Spanish: [ˈpanuko]) is a locality in the Mexican state of Zacatecas. It serves as the municipal seat of the eponymous Pánuco Municipality.

== History ==
Pánuco was founded on 1 November 1548 by explorers Diego de Ibarra, Francisco de Ibarra, and Cristóbal de Oñate. It became the seat of the eponymous municipality upon its foundation in 1824.

== Demographics ==
In the 2020 INEGI census, Pánuco recorded a population of 1,177 inhabitants living in 434 households.
