= Juan de Zaldívar (Spanish soldier) =

- Born: c. 1570; Northern Mexico
- Died: December 4, 1598; Acoma Pueblo, New Mexico
- Parent(s): Vicente de Zaldívar Sr. Magdalena de Mendoza y Salazar
- Relatives: Cristóbal de Oñate (paternal great-uncle); Juan de Oñate (uncle & second cousin); Vicente de Zaldívar (brother)

Juan de Zaldívar (c. 1570–1598) was a Spanish soldier and explorer. He was an early colonizer of New Mexico. He was killed by Acomas as retribution for raiding.

== Early life ==
Juan de Zaldívar was born circa 1570 in Northern Mexico. His father, Vicente de Zaldívar Sr., served in the Mixtón War of 1540-1542 alongside his uncle (thus Juan's great-uncle), Cristóbal de Oñate. His mother was Magdalena de Mendoza y Salazar. He had a brother, Vicente de Zaldívar. Juan de Oñate was their uncle and second cousin.

== Career ==
In 1595, Zaldívar was asked by his uncle, Juan de Oñate, to serve as his Maestre de Campo, or field marshal, in Oñate's colonization of New Mexico for the Spanish Crown. They departed from Santa Bárbara, Chihuahua in January 1598, arriving in Ciudad Juárez by April of the same year. They went up the Rio Grande, arriving in San Juan de los Caballeros (now known as Ohkay Owingeh, New Mexico) on July 11, 1598.

== Death ==
Zaldívar was killed by Acoma in Acoma Pueblo on December 4, 1598. His brother, Vicente de Zaldívar, perpetrated the Acoma Massacre, partly to avenge his death. Foot amputation and enslavement of the culprits (Native Americans) has been claimed.
