= Spanish Requirement of 1513 =

Loophole legislation that allowed Spanish atrocities in the New World

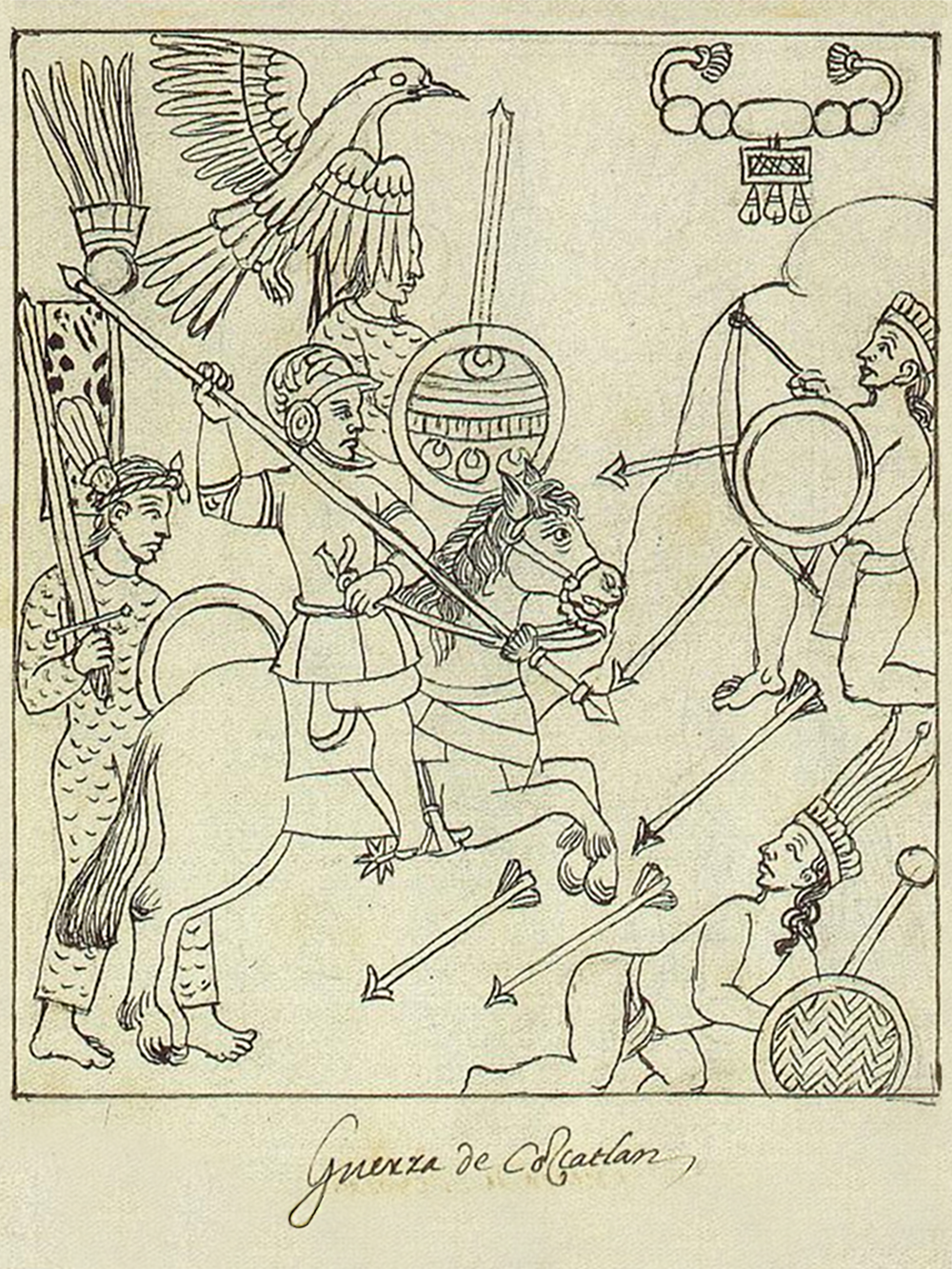
Drawing of a battle in the Spanish conquest of El Salvador, 1524

The Spanish Requirement of 1513 (Requerimiento) was a declaration by the Spanish monarchy of Castile's divinely ordained right to take possession of the territories of the New World and to subjugate, exploit and, when necessary, to fight the native inhabitants. The declaration was written by Juan López de Palacios Rubios, jurist of the Council of Castile, and made on behalf of Ferdinand II of Aragon and his daughter, the Queen regnant Joanna of Castile.

The Requerimiento (Spanish for "requirement", as in "demand") was read to Native Americans to inform them of Spain's rights to conquest. The Spaniards thus considered those who resisted as defying God's plan, and so used Catholic theology to justify their conquest.

== Historical context ==
In 1452, Pope Nicholas V issued the papal bull Dum Diversas, which legitimized the slave trade, at least as a result of war. It granted Afonso V of Portugal the right to reduce war-conquered "Saracens, pagans and any other unbelievers" to hereditary slavery. As such, the Dominican friars who arrived at the Spanish settlement at Santo Domingo in 1510 strongly denounced the enslavement of the local Indigenous residents. Along with other priests, they opposed the native peoples' treatment as unjust and illegal in an audience with the Spanish king and in the subsequent royal commission.

In Spain itself in 1492, the Moorish population of Granada had been given the choice by the first Archbishop of Granada, Hernando de Talavera: become Christian, or leave the country. In a letter to his religious brothers, Cardinal Cisneros, Talavera's successor, would celebrate the “peaceful domination” of the Moors of the Albaicin, a neighborhood of Granada, praising converts, lauding killing and extolling plunder. This letter came, however, after centuries of struggle by Christians in Spain to recapture what they saw as their homeland, which had been under Muslim rule for generations. Thus the war in Iberia, between Christians trying to "reconquer" land they thought of as properly Christian and Muslims defending the land their forefathers claimed by conquest they thought of as their right, heightened religious tensions and fervor on both sides.

Comparing the situation in the Old World and New World: in Spain's wars against the Moors, the clerics claimed that Muslims had knowledge of Christ and rejected Him, so that waging a Crusade against them was legitimate; in contrast, in Spain's wars against the Indigenous peoples of the Americas and Native Americans, wars against those who had never come into contact with Christianity were illegitimate. Responding to this impeding clerical position, the Requerimiento was issued, providing a religious justification for war against and conquest of the local populations of pre-existing residents, on the pretext of their refusing the legitimate authority of the Kings of Spain and Portugal as granted by the Pope.

So, the Requerimiento emerged in the context of moral debates within Spanish elites over the colonization of the Americas, and associated actions such as war, slavery, 'Indian reductions', conversions, relocations, and war crimes. Its use was criticized by many clerical missionaries, most prominently Bartolomé de las Casas.

To the King and Queen of Spain (Ferdinand II of Aragon, 1452–1516 and Isabella I of Castile, 1451–1504) the conquest of indigenous peoples was justified by natural law, embodied in the medieval doctrine of “just wars”, which had historically been a rationale for war against non-Christians, particularly the Moors, but which would now be applied to Native Americans. Coming shortly after the Reconquest, the realization of a centuries-long dream by Christians in Spain, the discovery, and colonization of the New World was directly affected by religious and political conditions in a now-unified Iberian Peninsula.

== Legal justification ==
Concerned that Spain would ensure control of the natives in the newly conquered Americas, the “Reyes Católicos”, Ferdinand and Isabella, consulted theologians and jurists for religious and legal justification of Spain's conquests. The treatment of the Native Americans was at first rationalized on the grounds that they were cannibals; any means of subjugation were acceptable. However, some of Christopher Columbus’s tactics with Native Americans had resulted in uprisings. In 1500, the king and queen again sought advice; the Native Americans were declared to be "free vassals". Despite their elevated status, the Native Americans remained subject to conquest in "just wars".

The Laws of Burgos of 1512 marked the first in a series of ordinances (“Ordenanzas sobre el buen tratamiento de los indios”) with the ostensible goal of protecting the Indians from excessive exploitation; natives could celebrate holidays, be paid for their labor and receive "good treatment". Similar legislation was adopted by the Junta of Valladolid in 1513 and the Junta of Madrid in 1516.

== Role of religion ==
The colonization of the New World by European adventurers was "justified" at the time on spiritual and religious grounds. In the conquest of the Americas, the Christian duty to evangelize nonbelievers took the form of conversion of Indians and other pagans at the hands of Roman Catholic priests.

To the European mind, the lands of the New World belonged to no one and could, therefore, be seized. The radical differences in thought and behavior of the Aztec and Mayan states, with their worship of entirely new, fierce gods, human sacrifice and complete unfamiliarity with European styles of diplomacy created a sense that conquest was not a war between states but the conquering, by a civilized, society against a ferocious, barbarous enemy. Moreover, since the native population was non-Christian, the Europeans' Christian religion conferred upon them the right and indeed the obligation to take possession of the lands and the people in the name of God and the throne.

More particularly, Catholic theology held that spiritual salvation took precedence over temporal and civil concerns. The conversion of pagan natives to Christianity was the rationale for and legitimized Spain's conquests. Thus "informed" by the Spanish, the Native people of the land had to accept the supremacy of the Catholic Church and the Spanish Crown. The state was authorized to enforce submission, by war if necessary.

== Content ==
The 1513 Requerimiento, in relation to the Spanish invasion of the Americas and the subsequent Spanish colonization of the Americas, demanded the local populations to accept Spanish rule and allow preaching to them by Catholic missionaries on pain of war, slavery or death. The Requerimiento did not demand conversion, but the Indian Reductions through the Encomienda and Mission systems often did. This claim provided a legal loophole for enslavement of the population as rebellious vassals if they resisted, and the document stated: "We emphasise that any deaths that result from this [rejection of Christian rule] are your fault…."

The European view of the inherent right to conquest and domination in the New World was captured in a declaration addressed to Indian populations known as El Requerimiento (The Requirement). The document was prepared by the Spanish jurist Juan López de Palacios Rubios, a staunch advocate of the divine right of monarchs and territorial conquest. It was first used in 1514 by Pedrarias Dávila, a Spanish aristocrat who had fought the Moors in Granada and later became Governor of Nicaragua.

The Spanish Requirement, issued in the names of King Ferdinand and Queen Juana, his daughter, was a mixture of religious and legal justifications for the confiscation of New World territories and the subjugation of their inhabitants. At the time, it was believed that Native Americans resisted conquest and conversion for one of two reasons: malice or ignorance. The Requirement was putatively meant to eliminate ignorance.

A member of the conquistador's force would read El Requerimiento in Castilian before a group of Indians on the shore, who, with or without translation, remained uncomprehending. All the region's inhabitants were thus considered to have been advised of Spain's religious and legal rights to conquest and forewarned of the consequences of resisting. The true nature of the Spanish Requirement, however, was one of absolution; the symbolic act of reading the document relieved the crown and its agents from legal and moral responsibility for the conquest, enslavement and killing of Native Americans. Readings were often dispensed with prior to planned attacks.

As the Spanish Requirement matter-of-factly sets forth, God created heaven and earth, and the first man and woman from whom all are descended. God directed St Peter to establish the Roman Catholic Church. St Peter's descendant, the Pope, lives in Rome. The Pope has given the New World territories to the King of Castile and directed the conversion of the Indians. If they listen carefully, the Indians will understand and accept what is happening as just; if not, Spain will make war on them.

In essence, the document created an ontology into which these ‘new’ lands and their peoples entered; with a place for them in the existing Spanish / European political and religious structure being entirely presupposed.

== Publication and Interpretation History ==
One of the first and most notable publications regarding the Requerimiento was from Franciscan Friar Bartolomé de las Casas, who criticizes the document and the injustices it allows in his A Short Account of the Destruction of the Indies (1552)

According to historian Lewis Hanke, in his foundational 1934 exploration of the document's publication history, the first English translation was published in 1583, and an illustrated Latin translation was published in Frankfurt in 1598.

In his 1600 History of the World, Sir Walter Raleigh, who was working to supplant Spanish dominance in the Americas, based his critique of the document's theological assumptions. Hanke notes that Raleigh cited de las Casa's Short Account and the graphic illustrations of cruelty included in the 1598 Latin publication.

In 1777 Scottish historian William Robertson provided another English translation of the document in his work The History of America. Robertson treated the document seriously and emphasized its importance in understanding the Spanish conquest and dominion over the new world.

In 1780 Giovanni Nuix, an Italian priest and defender of the Spanish, published his Riflessioni imparziali sopra l'umanitá degli Spagnuoli nell Indie . . . per servire di lume alle Storie de . . . Raynal e Robertson. Nuix asserted that the document was created by an obscure jurist who did not represent the ideas prevailing at the time of the Requerimiento's creation. This claim was echoed by some Catholic writers, such as Joseph Hergenroether in his 1876 Catholic Church and Christian State, where he asserts that the Requerimiento "did not proceed from the Pope, but was fabricated by officials and adventurers." Nuix also claimed that the document was never actually used in the Americas.

In 1849 Washington Irving published another English translation in volume III of his The Companions of Columbus.

In 1855, in the first volume of his The Spanish Conquest in America and its Relation to the History of Slavery and to the Government of Colonies, historian Sir Arthur Helps published another translation, considered definitive by subsequent authors. He criticized the ironic nature of the document, calling it foolish and even comical.

Writing in 1883, Hubert Howe Bancroft considered the Requerimiento both "void in practice" and "absurd in theory.

In 1927 Argentinian historian Juan B. Teran, in his "El Nacimiento de la America Espanol" (The Birth of Spanish America), states that the document was a fundamental ordinance of the conquest and presents it as an example of the impractical idealism of the laws in the new world.

In Louis Bertrand and Sir Charles Petrie's comprehensive 1934 work The History of Spain the authors condemn the document, calling it "rubbish" designed to justify the Spanish invasion.

James Muldoon's 1980 article "John Wyclif and the Rights of the Infidels: The Requerimiento Re-Examined" situates the document within the world of medieval theological debates regarding the rights of infidels and non-Christians to rule themselves. Muldoon considers the discussion of the Requerimiento in Lewis Hanke's 1949 The Spanish Struggle for Justice in the Conquest of America to offer a good introduction to the document.

== Evaluation ==
Many critics of the conquistadors' policies were appalled by the flippant nature of the Requerimiento, and Bartolomé de las Casas said in response to it that he did not know whether to laugh or to cry. While the conquistadors were encouraged to use an interpreter to read the Requerimiento, it was not absolutely necessary, and in many cases, it was read out to an uncomprehending populace.

In some instances, it was read to barren beaches and empty villages long after the indigenous people and communities had left, to prisoners after they were captured, and even from the decks of ships once they had just spotted the coast. Nevertheless, for the conquistadors, it provided a religious justification and rationalization for attacking and conquering the native population. Because of its potential to support the enrichment of the Spanish royal coffers, the Requerimiento was not generally questioned until the Spanish crown had abolished its use in 1556.

== Text ==
On behalf of the King, Don Fernando, and of Doña Juana I, his daughter, Queen of Castille and León, subduers of the barbarous nations, we their servants notify and make known to you, as best we can, that the Lord our God, Living and Eternal, created the Heaven and the Earth, and one man and one woman, of whom you and we, all the men of the world at the time, were and are descendants, and all those who came after and before us. But, on account of the multitude which has sprung from this man and woman in the five thousand or even more years since the world was created, it was necessary that some men should go one way and some another, and that they should be divided into many kingdoms and provinces, for in one alone they could not be sustained.

Of all these nations God our Lord gave charge to one man, called St. Peter, that he should be Lord and Superior of all the men in the world, that all should obey him, and that he should be the head of the whole Human Race, wherever men should live, and under whatever law, sect, or belief they should be; and he gave him the world for his kingdom and jurisdiction.

And he commanded him to place his seat in Rome, as the spot most fitting to rule the world from; but also he permitted him to have his seat in any other part of the world, and to judge and govern all Christians, Moors, Jews, Gentiles, and all other Sects. This man was called Pope, as if to say, Admirable Great Father and Governor of men. The men who lived in that time obeyed that St. Peter, and took him for Lord, King, and Superior of the universe; so also they have regarded the others who after him have been elected to the pontificate, and so has it been continued even till now, and will continue till the end of the world.

One of these Pontiffs, who succeeded that St. Peter as Lord of the world, in the dignity and seat which I have before mentioned, made donation of these isles and Tierra-firme to the aforesaid King and Queen and to their successors, our lords, with all that there are in these territories, as is contained in certain writings which passed upon the subject as aforesaid, which you can see if you wish.

So their Highnesses are kings and lords of these islands and the land of Tierra-firme by virtue of this donation: and some islands, and indeed almost all those to whom this has been notified, have received and served their Highnesses, as lords and kings, in the way that subjects ought to do, with good will, without any resistance, immediately, without delay, when they were informed of the aforesaid facts. And also they received and obeyed the priests whom their Highnesses sent to preach to them and to teach them our Holy Faith; and all these, of their own free will, without any reward or condition, have become Christians, and are so, and their Highnesses have joyfully and benignantly received them, and also have commanded them to be treated as their subjects and vassals; and you too are held and obliged to do the same. Wherefore, as best we can, we ask and require you that you consider what we have said to you, that you take the time that shall be necessary to understand and deliberate upon it, and that you acknowledge the Church as the Ruler and Superior of the whole world, and the high priest called Pope, and in his name the King and Queen Doña Juana our lords, in his place, as superiors and lords and kings of these islands and this Tierra-firme by virtue of the said donation, and that you consent and give place that these religious fathers should declare and preach to you the aforesaid.

If you do so, you will do well, and that which you are obliged to do to their Highnesses, and we in their name shall receive you in all love and charity, and shall leave you, your wives, and your children, and your lands, free without servitude, that you may do with them and with yourselves freely that which you like and think best, and they shall not compel you to turn Christians, unless you yourselves, when informed of the truth, should wish to be converted to our Holy Catholic Faith, as almost all the inhabitants of the rest of the islands have done. And, besides this, their Highnesses will award you many privileges and exemptions and will grant you many benefits.

But, if you do not do this, and maliciously make delay in it, I certify to you that, with the help of God, we shall powerfully enter into your country, and shall make war against you in all ways and manners that we can, and shall subject you to the yoke and obedience of the Church and of their Highnesses; we shall take you and your wives and your children, and shall make slaves of them, and as such shall sell and dispose of them as their Highnesses may command; and we shall take away your goods, and shall do you all the mischief and damage that we can, as to vassals who do not obey, and refuse to receive their lord, and resist and contradict him; and we protest that the deaths and losses which shall accrue from this are your fault, and not that of their Highnesses, or ours, nor of these cavaliers who come with us. And that we have said this to you and made this Requisition, we request the notary here present to give us his testimony in writing, and we ask the rest who are present that they should be witnesses of this Requisition.

== See also ==
- Black legend (Spain)
- La Toma (1598)
- Indian Reductions
- Spanish colonization of the Americas
- Valladolid debate
