= Statue of Juan de Oñate (Albuquerque, New Mexico) =

La Jornada
- Interactive map of La Jornada
- Location: Albuquerque, New Mexico, U.S.
- Coordinates: 35°05′53″N 106°40′02″W
- Designer: Reynaldo "Sonny" Rivera; Betty Sabo
- Opening date: 2005
- Dedicated to: Juan de Oñate
- Dismantled date: June 2020

La Jornada is a 33-piece sculpture by Reynaldo "Sonny" Rivera and Betty Sabo which depicts Juan de Oñate leading an expedition of Spanish settlers.

== History ==
The statue was commissioned in the late 1990s, and installed on the grounds of the Albuquerque Museum in Albuquerque, New Mexico in 2004. It was removed by the city in June 2020. This decision followed an attempt by protesters to topple it as part of the George Floyd protests, which led to one protester being shot by a member of the New Mexico Civil Guard, a militia which was subsequently ordered to disband.

Native activists have long opposed monuments to conquistadors, and Oñate is specifically controversial due to having ordered the murder and mutilation of hundreds of people during the Acoma Massacre of 1599.

== See also ==
- Equestrian statue of Juan de Oñate – Another statue of Oñate in New Mexico which was removed following protests
- List of monuments and memorials removed during the George Floyd protests
