= Cristóbal de Oñate =

Spanish conquistador (1504–1567)

- Born: 1504; Vitoria, Álava Province, Spain
- Died: October 6, 1567 (aged 62–63); Pánuco, Viceroyalty of New Spain (now Zacatecas, Mexico)
- Occupations: Explorer, conquistador, colonial official
- Known for: Founder of Guadalajara
- Spouse: Catalina de Salazar de la Cadena
- Children: 6, including Juan de Oñate
- Parent(s): Juan Perez de Oñate; Osaña González
- Relatives: Juan de Zaldívar (great-nephew); Vicente de Zaldívar (great-nephew)

Cristóbal de Oñate (1504 — October 6, 1567) was a Spanish Basque explorer, conquistador and colonial official in New Spain. He is considered the founder of the contemporary city of Guadalajara in 1531, as well as other places in Nueva Galicia (western New Spain).

== Background ==
Oñate was born in 1504 in Vitoria-Gasteiz, Álava, to Juan Perez de Oñate and Osaña González. He was born into the House of Haro, whose origins date to the Middle Ages. He was a grandson of Pedro de Baeza, Señor de Narrihondo, one of Spain's last feudal lords.

He was an officer and executive who became one of the first millionaires in North America. He discovered the richest silver mines on the continent, located in Zacatecas.

== Activities in New Spain ==
Oñate arrived in New Spain in 1524 as the assistant to Rodrigo de Albornoz. Charles V, Holy Roman Emperor and king of Spain had made Albornoz auditor, one of five royal officials named to oversee Cortés's government in the colony.

In New Spain, he was reunited with his twin nephews Juan and Vicente de Zaldívar y Oñate. Cristobal de Oñate contracted marriage with Catalina de Salazar de la Cadena, daughter of Gonzalo de Salazar and Catalina De La Cadena Maluenda. This was Catalina's second marriage. Her maternal uncle Antonio De La Cadena Maluenda, was Treasurer of New Spain. Gonzalo Salazar was a high-ranking official in the Royal Treasury of the colony, and at times a member of the junta that ruled New Spain.

In 1529 he was a part of the expedition of Nuño Beltrán de Guzmán that conquered the western part of Mexico (the current states of Nayarit, Jalisco, Colima, Aguascalientes and parts of Sinaloa, Zacatecas and San Luis Potosí). This conquest took only a few years, and the newly conquered region became known as Nueva Galicia. The foundation of the cities of Compostela and Tepic in present-day Nayarit and Guadalajara and Zacatecas is attributed to Oñate.

In 1531 (probably January), Oñate founded a small town near Nochistlán to which the name Guadalajara was given. Two years later Beltrán de Guzmán visited the city, and at the request of its inhabitants, who were fearful of Indian attacks and lacked sufficient water, he ordered it moved to Tonalá. This occurred on May 24, 1533. Later, after Beltrán had returned to Spain, it was moved again, to a site near Tlacotan (northeast of modern Zapopan). This occurred probably between October 1541 and February of the following year.

In 1542, Oñate palace was built in Guadalajara, Mexico, by Don Cristóbal de Oñate. This palace became known as the "Palace of Medrano" and is the setting of a 19th-century play called El Palacio de Medrano.

During the conquest of Zacatecas rich silver mines were discovered that made Cristóbal de Oñate and his partners Baltasar Temiño de Bañuelos, Diego de Ibarra and Juan de Tolosa among the richest men in New Spain. Oñate settled at the Pánuco mine in Zacatecas, where five of his six children were born. The Pánuco mine was inherited by his descendant Don Juan Bravo de Medrano y Oñate, I Count of Santa Rosa in the 17th century.

One of his sons, Juan de Oñate, married Isabel de Tolosa Cortes-Moctezuma, granddaughter of conquistador Hernán Cortés and greatgranddaughter of the last Aztec Emperor Moctezuma Xocoyotzin. Juan became an explorer of western North America and founder of the first Spanish settlement on the upper Rio Grande in the present U.S. state of New Mexico. Both Juan and his son Cristóbal served as Spanish governors of Nuevo Mexico.

Cristóbal de Oñate served as governor of the province of Nueva Galicia on three occasions. He attempted without success to suppress the Caxcan Indians during the Mixton War in 1541 and was later accused by Caxcan leader Francisco Tenamaztle of murdering and exploiting Indians. Although accusing does not imply telling the truth, contrary to other Spaniards who were convicted of mistreatment of indigenous people, Cristobal de Oñate was not sentenced at all.

As stated, he actively participated in the Mixtón War, where his restraint was not appreciated by viceroy Antonio de Mendoza, and Pedro de Alvarado who, without heeding his advice to use more peaceful methods, attacked the rock without rest and without results. Attacks that left the town of Guadalajara unguarded. How Jorge Luis García Ruiz relates in his book Presidio:

"The Indians found themselves in force and two months later they were besieging Guadalajara. Cristóbal de Oñate, in command of the Spanish forces, decided to break the siege, placing the women with arquebuses on top of the wall in order to appear more defensive, and concentrating the artillery and cavalry on one of the fronts, and after destroying it, re-entering the city to, leaving through another gate, charge on another front, making the Indians think that there was much more force than the real one. receiving significant damage, the Indians under the command of Francisco Tenamaztle and Don Diego raised the siege by withdrawing."

Besides being a conquistador, official and mineowner, he was a farmer, rancher and encomendero. Although he was a lieutenant of Beltrán de Guzmán, Onate seems also to have had a more benign side. He was a benefactor of the cities he founded. A generous spirit, he offered meals to the needy on a daily basis throughout his entire life, and is said to have turned over the proceeds from his encomiendas to improve native villages. Today, ancient Indian tribes and reservations persist in Mexico and the American Southwest. In the cities Onate founded, many streets, businesses, and geographic locations bear his name. He established a dynasty that retained wealth and power for 300 years.

Cristobal died in Pánuco, Zacatecas, on October 6, 1567, and was interred in the parochial church there.

== See also ==
- Juan de Oñate
- Guadalajara
- Tepic
- Compostela, Nayarit
- Nuño Beltrán de Guzmán
- Nueva Galicia

== Notes ==
- This article, unless otherwise noted, is a free translation of the Spanish Wikipedia article Cristóbal de Oñate accessed February 19, 2007.

New title	Encomendero of Culhuacan; 1525–1568	Succeeded by Fernando de Oñate
