= 1599 Acoma massacre =

1599 massacre of Puebloans by Spanish soldiers

Acoma Massacre
- Part of the Acoma War, Conquest of New Mexico
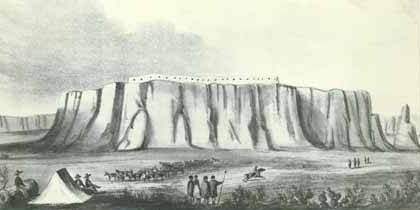
- A lithograph of Ácoma Pueblo made in 1848
Date	January 22–24, 1599
Location	Acoma Pueblo, New Mexico 34.896°N 107.582°W
Result	Spanish victory in battle, civilians massacred.

Belligerents
Crown of Castile	Acoma

Commanders and leaders
(Crown of Castile) Vicente de Zaldívar	Zutacapan

Strength
~70 conquistadors ~Indian auxiliaries ~1 artillery piece	~2,000 warriors

Casualties and losses
Unknown	~500 killed ~500 captured
- Civilian casualties ≈300 killed

The Acoma Massacre was a punitive expedition by Spanish conquistadors at the Acoma Pueblo in January, 1599. Around 500 Acoma men and 300 women and children were killed during the three-day onslaught. Of the Acoma who survived the attack, many were sentenced to 20-year terms of bondage, and 24 suffered amputations.

The massacre was the result of a battle between Spanish colonizers and Native Americans from the Keres Acoma Nation in what is now New Mexico in retaliation for the killing of 12 Spanish soldiers by the Acoma in the previous year.

== Background ==
In the late 1500s the Spanish Crown began ordering conquest expeditions into the territories of Pueblo peoples, areas of which Spain sought to gain control of as part of the colonization efforts in New Spain. In 1595, the conquistador Don Juan de Oñate was granted permission by King Philip II to colonize Santa Fe de Nuevo México, the present-day American state of New Mexico.

The early years of Spanish exploits in the area had seen but a few, mostly peaceful, encounters with the Acoma people, who outnumbered the colonizers in the decades after 1627. However, in 1598, Zutacapan, the Acoma cacique and spiritual leader, learned that the Spanish emissaries intended to conquer Acoma Pueblo by force. Zutacapan also learned that the Spanish plan was to have all the Pueblo people move to a new village in the valley, where they would live under Spanish rule, and work for the Crown under the colonial forced-labor system known as encomienda. The Acoma would also be forced to convert to Catholicism and forsake their traditional beliefs and practices. Seeking to protect the Pueblo's material and religious integrity, Pueblo leadership decided to prepare to resist Spanish aggression.

Juan de Zaldívar, Oñate's nephew and soldier, was sent to the pueblo to meet with Zutacapan. Upon arriving on December 4, 1598, the Spanish envoy demanded food and shelter for himself and his sixteen men. After being rebuffed, the group reportedly invaded Acoma homes, breaking walls and destroying property in order to take maize and blankets by force, leaving Keres women curled up naked with their children. The Acoma resisted and a fight ensued, leaving Zaldívar and eleven of his men dead.

When Oñate learned of the incident, he ordered Juan's brother, Vicente de Zaldívar, to lead an expedition to punish the Acoma and set an example for other Pueblos. Taking about seventy men, Vincente de Zaldivar left San Juan Pueblo in late December or early January and arrived at Acoma on January 21, 1599.

== Battle ==
The main battle between the Acoma and the Spaniards began the following morning, January 22. For the first two days the Acoma were able to withstand Spanish forces, until Zaldívar developed a plan to breach the Pueblo's defenses using a small cannon. On the third day, Zaldívar and twelve of his men ascended the mesa and opened fire on the Pueblo with the cannon. The Spaniard's heavy artillery was incomparable to the Acoma's arsenal. A large fire engulfed many Acoma homes during the battle. The conquistadors then stormed the settlement.

There were an estimated 4,000 people living at or around the Acoma Pueblo in 1598, of whom at least 1,000 were warriors. An estimated 500 men were killed in the battle, along with about 300 women and children. Some 500 prisoners were taken and later sentenced by Oñate to a variety of punishments after a trial was held at San Juan Pueblo. Oñate ordered that every male above the age of twenty-five would have his right foot cut off and be enslaved for a period of twenty years. Twenty-four men suffered amputation. Males between the age of twelve and twenty-five were also enslaved for twenty years along with all of the females above the age of twelve.

Most of the remaining natives were dispersed among the residences of government officials or at Franciscan missions. Sixty of the youngest women were deemed not guilty and sent to Mexico City where they were "parceled out among Catholic convents". Two Hopi men were taken prisoner at the pueblo; after each had one of his hands cut off, they were released to spread the word of Spain's might. After the massacre, the town was abandoned out of fear until it was reconstructed again by the Pueblo in 1599.

=== Alternative interpretations ===
Whether the whole foot of the massacre's victims were cut off has been subject of scrutiny. In a 2002 letter to the editor in support of El Paso's new statue of Oñate, a commentator specified that original records from the time translate as "cut off the ends of their toes." In another letter from 2017, a commentator stated that, in Onate's personal journal, he specifically refers to the punishment of the Acoma warriors as cutting off "las puntas del pie" (the points of the foot, the toes). These arguments include the idea that the Spanish would not have limited a slave's usefulness by removing their foot.

== Aftermath ==
The punishments inflicted on those who were not killed in combat included amputation of hands and feet or being sold into slavery. When King Philip heard the news of the massacre, and the punishments, Oñate was banished from New Mexico for his cruelty to the natives, and later returned to Spain to live out the remainder of his life. Several Acomas escaped capture by the Spanish in 1599 and by 1601 had rebuilt their pueblo, which still stands.

=== Present-day Acoma views ===
The massacre remains a sensitive issue among Puebloans. In 1998, during the 400-year anniversary of Spain's founding of New Mexico colony, a group of Acomas cut off the right foot of the twelve-foot (3.7 m) Equestrian statue of Juan de Oñate in Alcalde, New Mexico. They later issued a statement about the incident: "We took the liberty of removing Oñate's right foot on behalf of our brothers and sister of Acoma Pueblo." The foot was replaced the same year. The statue was removed in June 2020, in the wake of the murder of George Floyd and subsequent protests.

On April 21, 2007, an eighteen-foot-tall (5.5 m) statue of Oñate – the largest bronze equestrian statue in the United States – was erected at El Paso, Texas. Members of the Acoma tribe attended the dedication ceremony and protested against the statue's construction.

On June 15, 2020, the statue at Alcalde was removed by Rio Arriba County officials for safekeeping during the George Floyd protests. The County Commission issued a statement that they had not decided the statue's future. La Jornada, another statue of Oñate in Albuquerque, New Mexico, was also taken down during the protests by local government officials, following a protest where a counter-protester shot one of the protesters.

== See also ==
- Indian massacre
- List of massacres in New Mexico
