= Juan López de Palacios Rubios =

Spanish jurist

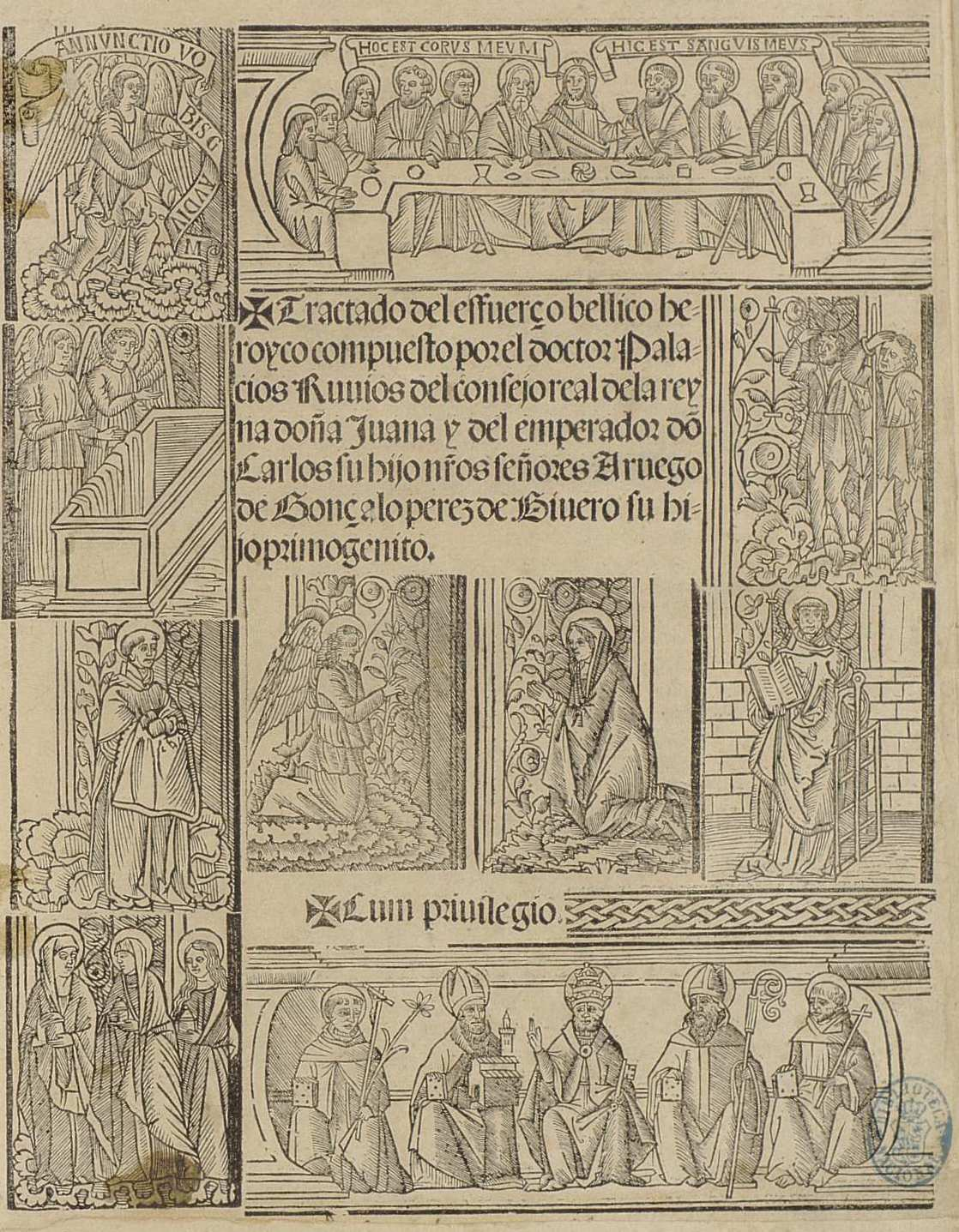

Juan López de Palacios Rubios (1450–1524) was a Spanish jurist called El Doctor for his expertise in canon law. He was the primary author of the famous Requerimiento, read during the conquest of America to the Indians, instructing them to submit peacefully. The text informed the natives that they were vassals of the Castilian monarch and subjects of the pope and, if they opposed they would be subjugated by force and turned into slaves.

López studied at the University of Salamanca, where he later served as a professor of law. He served as College of San Bartolome, President of the Mesta during the reign of Ferdinand and Isabella, judge of Valladolid, Minister of the Council of India and Ambassador to Rome. In 1494 he was awarded the chair of premium charges at the University of Valladolid, exercising judicial functions in the chancery of the same city. Later follow the career system and reach the offices of the Royal Council member and president of the Royal Council of the Mesta (founded in 1273 by Alfonso X the Wise).

As a member of the Council of Castile from 1504, by appointment of the Catholic Monarchs, he was one of the drafters of the Laws of Toro (enacted in 1505), one of the main proponents of the issue of the Righteous Domain Titles of Castile on Indies. Specifically, in his Oceanis Insulis Libellus of legal reasoning makes a conscientious about the legitimacy of Spanish sovereignty in the American territories.

Among his works are also found military writings, most notably the Treaty of the heroic war effort (Salamanca, 1524), the only work he wrote in Castilian with a distinctly political tone.

== Bibliography ==
- Hanke, Lewis (1949). The Spanish Struggle for Justice in the Conquest of America. Philadelphia: University of Pennsylvania Press. pp. 29–33.
- Lantigua, David M. (2020). Infidels and Empires in a New World Order. Cambridge University Press. pp. 62–65.
- McAllister, Lyle N. (1984). Spain and Portugal in the New World, 1492-1700. University of Minnesota. p. 90.
- Seed, Patricia (1995). Ceremonies of Possession in Europe's Conquest of the New World: 1492-1640. Cambridge University Press. pp. 69–71.
- Williams, Robert A. (1990). The American Indian in Western Legal Thought: The Discourses of Conquest. Oxford University Press. ISBN 0195050223.

Spanish

- Barrientos Grandón, Javier. "Juan Lopez de Vivero". Real Academia de la Historia (in Spanish).
- "Juan López de Palacios Rubios" (Spanish). Biografías y Vidas. 2004. pp. 90–91.
