= Alcalde, New Mexico =

Alcalde, New Mexico Anųbúuˀú (Tewa)
- CDP
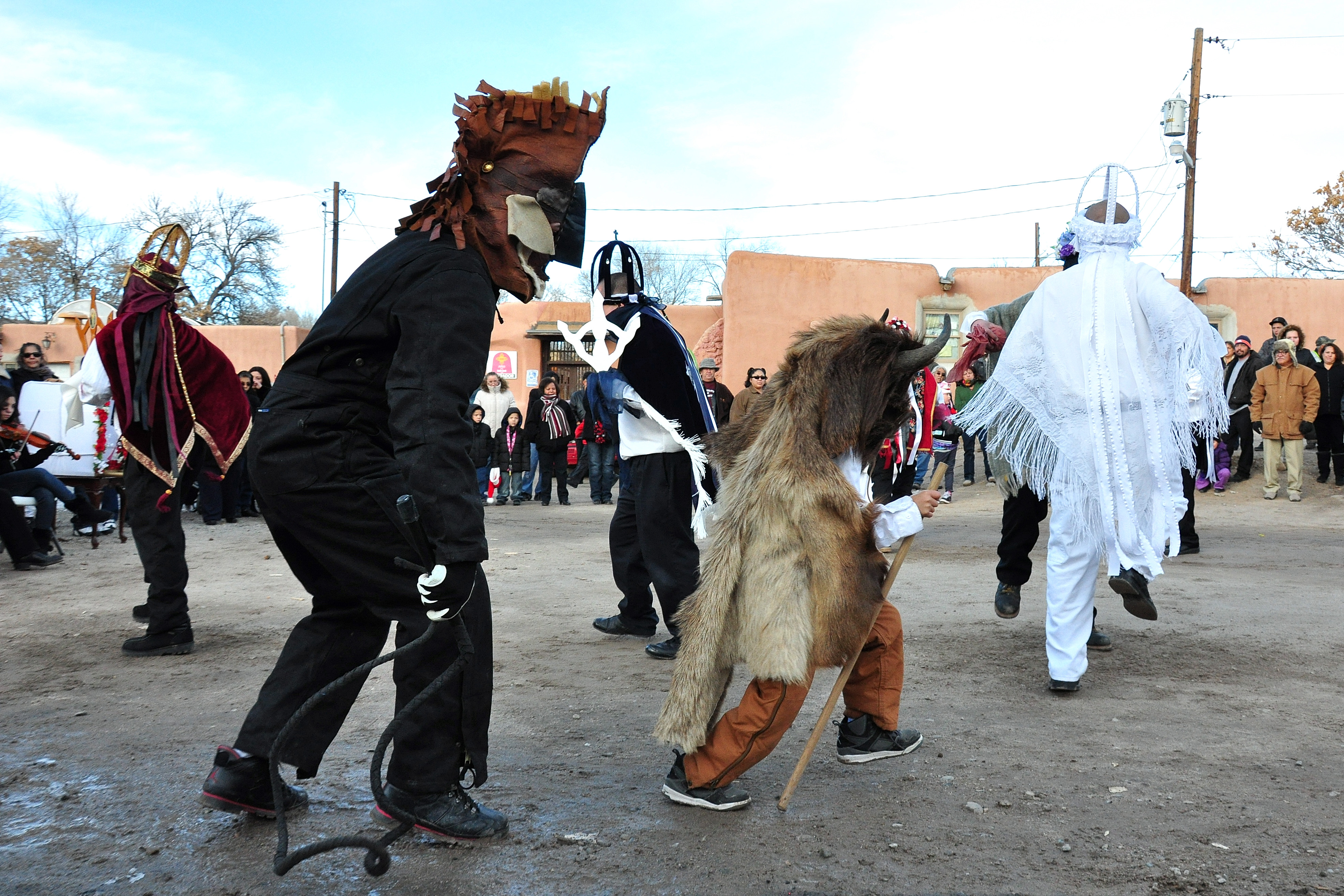
- Los Matachines de Alcalde, 2013

- Location of Alcalde, New Mexico

- Location in the United States
- Coordinates: 36°05′07″N 106°03′27″W
- Country: United States
- State: New Mexico
- County: Rio Arriba

Area
  - Total: 0.52 sq mi (1.34 km^{2})
  - Land: 0.52 sq mi (1.34 km^{2})
  - Water: 0 sq mi (0.00 km^{2})
- Elevation: 5,693 ft (1,735 m)

Population (2020)
  - Total: 310
  - Density: 601/sq mi (231.9/km^{2})
- Time zone: UTC-7 (Mountain (MST))
  - Summer (DST): UTC-6 (MDT)
- ZIP code: 87511
- Area code: 505
- FIPS code: 35-02070
- GNIS feature ID: 2407711

Alcalde (Spanish for 'mayor'; Tewa: Anųbúuˀú, pronounced [ʔɑ̀nũ̀búːʔú]) is a census-designated place (CDP) in Rio Arriba County, New Mexico, United States. In 2022, the Census Bureau lists the population at 235.

== Historic sites ==
- The Oñate Monument Center located in Alcalde on New Mexico Highway 68.
- Historic site of Los Luceros Hacienda, an 18th-century Spanish complex consisting of 5 buildings. Los Luceros was built in 1703 on the side of a land grant owned by Capitan Sebastian Martin Serrano.

== History ==
Each year on December 27, the city of Alcalde celebrates a feast day. One prominent focus of the celebration is when villagers enact Los Comanches, a poetic drama written in 1780. The performance, based on true events, depicts the Spanish army's defeat of Comanche leader, Green Horn.

=== Juan De Oñate ===
Juan de Oñate, nicknamed The Last Conquistador, led the final Spanish-funded colonization venture of nearly 500 people to colonize the area of northern New Mexico in 1598.

In the summer of 2020, two statues of Juan de Oñate were taken down amid longstanding tensions between Native Americans and Hispanics over Spain's conquest of New Mexico. Gunfire erupted during a protest in Albuquerque, where demonstrators called for the removal of a statue of Oñate, the tyrannical conquistador whose legacy has become a focal point in the wider national movement to confront racial injustice. While protests across the country have targeted various symbols of oppression, including statues of Christopher Columbus, the focus in New Mexico is shifting toward challenging symbols of colonial violence.

Earlier that day, authorities in the northern town of Alcalde removed another statue of Oñate, whose harsh rule as governor played a pivotal role in establishing centuries of Spanish control in the region.

=== Georgia O'Keeffe ===
Renowned artist Georgia O'Keeffe created the oil painting titled Near Alcalde, New Mexico, 1931 as a depiction of the Spanish Mission Church just outside of Alcalde. The painting is now housed in the Yale University Art Gallery.

== Geography ==
According to the United States Census Bureau, the CDP has a total area of 0.5 square miles (1.3 km^{2}), all land.

=== Climate ===
Climate data for Alcalde, New Mexico, 1991–2020 normals, extremes 1953–present
Month	Jan	Feb	Mar	Apr	May	Jun	Jul	Aug	Sep	Oct	Nov	Dec	Year
Record high °F (°C)	70 (21)	73 (23)	83 (28)	88 (31)	98 (37)	101 (38)	102 (39)	100 (38)	95 (35)	90 (32)	79 (26)	68 (20)	102 (39)
Mean maximum °F (°C)	58.1 (14.5)	64.7 (18.2)	74.7 (23.7)	80.9 (27.2)	88.4 (31.3)	95.6 (35.3)	96.6 (35.9)	93.6 (34.2)	89.5 (31.9)	81.7 (27.6)	69.3 (20.7)	58.4 (14.7)	97.5 (36.4)
Mean daily maximum °F (°C)	45.1 (7.3)	51.0 (10.6)	60.0 (15.6)	67.4 (19.7)	76.2 (24.6)	86.0 (30.0)	88.1 (31.2)	85.6 (29.8)	79.8 (26.6)	68.7 (20.4)	55.4 (13.0)	44.5 (6.9)	67.3 (19.6)
Daily mean °F (°C)	30.2 (−1.0)	35.3 (1.8)	42.4 (5.8)	49.6 (9.8)	58.1 (14.5)	67.1 (19.5)	71.8 (22.1)	69.6 (20.9)	62.2 (16.8)	50.3 (10.2)	38.7 (3.7)	29.8 (−1.2)	50.4 (10.2)
Mean daily minimum °F (°C)	15.3 (−9.3)	19.6 (−6.9)	24.8 (−4.0)	31.9 (−0.1)	39.9 (4.4)	48.2 (9.0)	55.4 (13.0)	53.7 (12.1)	44.6 (7.0)	31.9 (−0.1)	22.0 (−5.6)	15.2 (−9.3)	33.5 (0.8)
Mean minimum °F (°C)	4.5 (−15.3)	8.5 (−13.1)	13.8 (−10.1)	20.9 (−6.2)	29.0 (−1.7)	38.5 (3.6)	46.5 (8.1)	45.9 (7.7)	33.5 (0.8)	21.5 (−5.8)	11.0 (−11.7)	5.0 (−15.0)	1.4 (−17.0)
Record low °F (°C)	−34 (−37)	−12 (−24)	4 (−16)	11 (−12)	18 (−8)	32 (0)	39 (4)	34 (1)	23 (−5)	9 (−13)	−11 (−24)	−11 (−24)	−34 (−37)
Average precipitation inches (mm)	0.51 (13)	0.39 (9.9)	0.69 (18)	0.70 (18)	0.78 (20)	0.78 (20)	1.65 (42)	1.75 (44)	1.25 (32)	1.14 (29)	0.73 (19)	0.73 (19)	11.10 (282)
Average snowfall inches (cm)	2.2 (5.6)	1.5 (3.8)	1.4 (3.6)	0.3 (0.76)	0.0 (0.0)	0.0 (0.0)	0.0 (0.0)	0.0 (0.0)	0.0 (0.0)	0.6 (1.5)	1.4 (3.6)	3.3 (8.4)	10.7 (27.26)
Average precipitation days (≥ 0.01 in)	2.8	3.0	3.8	4.1	4.2	3.9	8.2	8.5	5.4	4.9	3.1	3.3	55.2
Average snowy days (≥ 0.1 in)	1.3	1.1	0.5	0.3	0.0	0.0	0.0	0.0	0.0	0.2	0.5	1.7	5.6
Source 1: NOAA
Source 2: National Weather Service

== Demographics ==
Historical population
Census	Pop.	Note	%±
2020	310		—
U.S. Decennial Census

At the 2000 census there were 377 people, 121 households, and 99 families in the CDP. The population density was 735.3 inhabitants per square mile (283.9/km^{2}). There were 138 housing units at an average density of 269.2 per square mile (103.9/km^{2}). The racial makeup of the CDP was 37.40% White, 0.27% African American, 1.59% Native American, 0.27% Asian, 54.64% from other races, and 5.84% from two or more races. Hispanic or Latino of any race were 89.12%.

Of the 121 households 46.3% had children under the age of 18 living with them, 52.1% were married couples living together, 19.8% had a female householder with no husband present, and 17.4% were non-families. 16.5% of households were one person and 7.4% were one person aged 65 or older. The average household size was 3.12 and the average family size was 3.39.

The age distribution was 32.9% under the age of 18, 7.2% from 18 to 24, 32.1% from 25 to 44, 15.4% from 45 to 64, and 12.5% 65 or older. The median age was 31 years. For every 100 females, there were 95.3 males. For every 100 females age 18 and over, there were 99.2 males.

The median household income was $37,969 and the median family income was $38,250. Males had a median income of $31,375 versus $20,341 for females. The per capita income for the CDP was $13,656. About 10.7% of families and 12.6% of the population were below the poverty line, including 8.6% of those under age 18 and 13.6% of those age 65 or over.

== Education ==
It is in Española Public Schools. Alcalde has one elementary school, Alcalde Elementary. The comprehensive public high school is Española Valley High School.

== See also ==
- List of census-designated places in New Mexico
- Juan de Oñate - Wikipedia
