= Pánuco Municipality, Zacatecas =

Municipality in Zacatecas. Mexico

Coordinates: 22°54′N 102°33′W

Pánuco
- Municipality
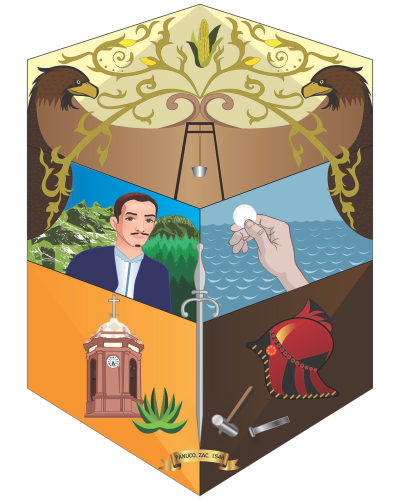
- Coat of arms

- Location in Mexico Pánuco (Mexico)
- Country: Mexico
- State: Zacatecas
- Demonym: (in Spanish)
- Time zone: UTC−6 (CST)

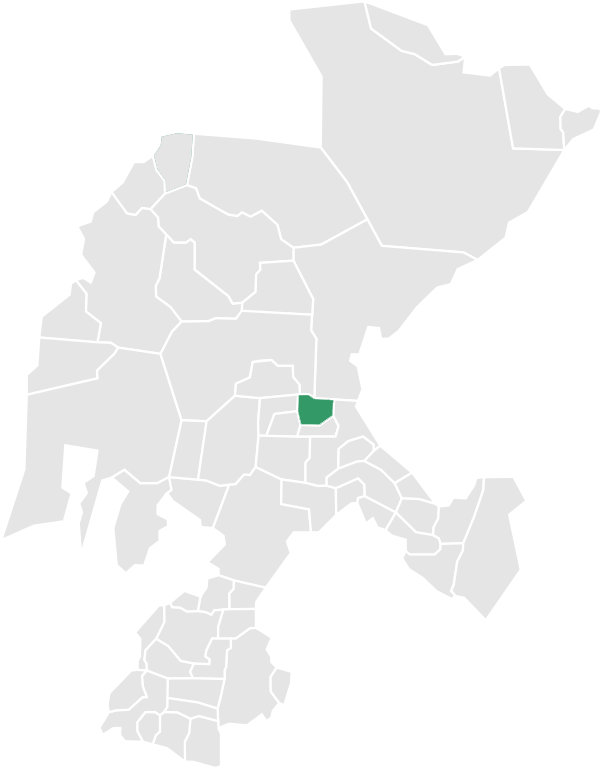

Pánuco Municipality is a municipality located in the Mexican state of Zacatecas.

== Area ==
The area of the municipality is 555 km^{2} (214 sq mi).
