= Waco people =

North American indigenous tribe

Waco
wí:koʔ (Wichita)
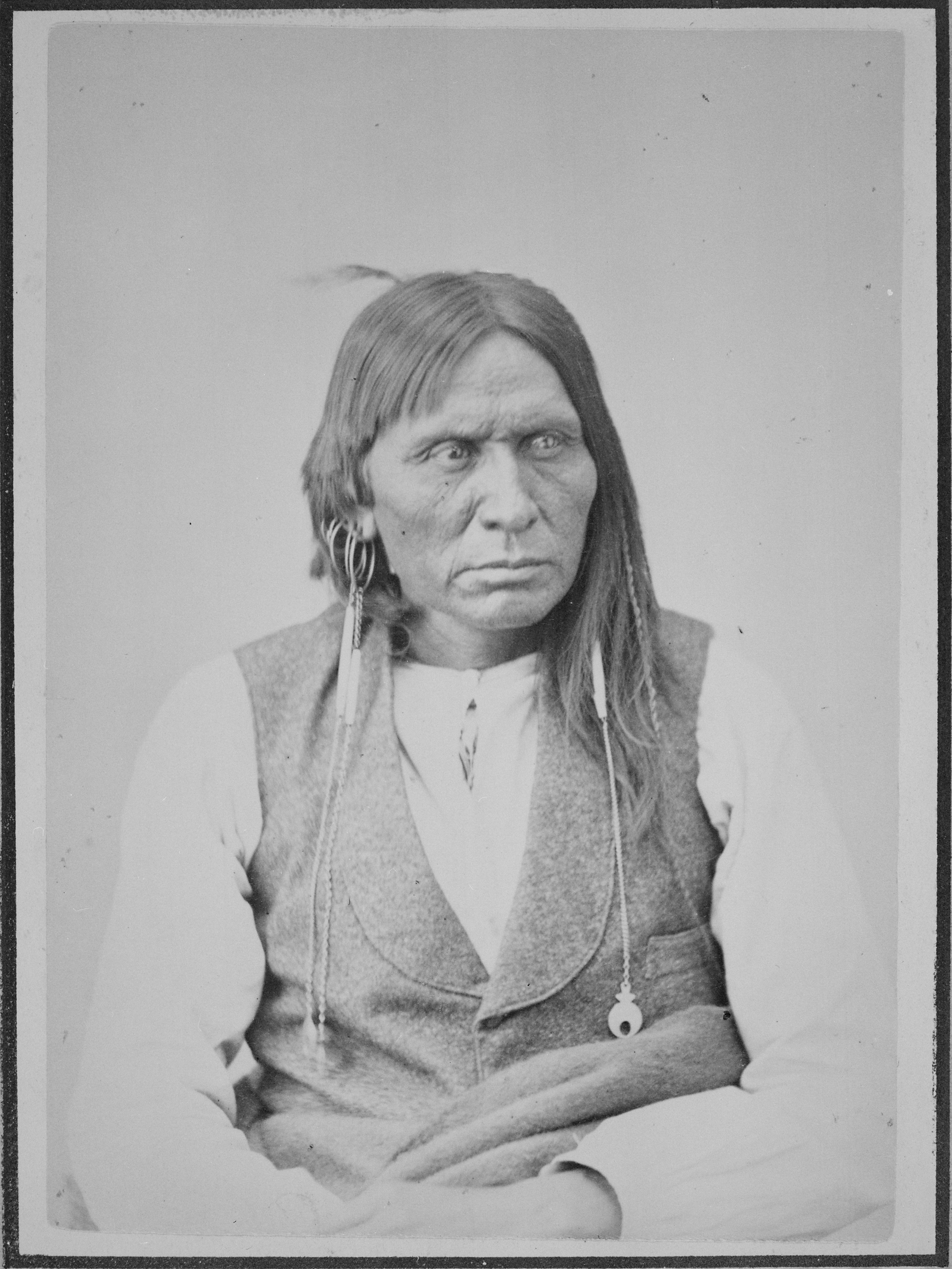
- Long Soldier, a Waco man, 1872

Total population
- fewer than 2,953 (2018)

Regions with significant populations
- Oklahoma, historically Texas

Languages
- English, formerly Wichita

Religion
- Native American Church, Christianity, indigenous religion

Related ethnic groups
- Caddo, Pawnee, other Wichita and Affiliated Tribes

The Waco (Wichita: wí:koʔ; also spelled Huaco and Hueco) of the Wichita people are a Southern Plains Native American tribe that inhabited northeastern Texas. Today, they are enrolled members of the federally recognized Wichita and Affiliated Tribes, headquartered in Anadarko, Oklahoma (seat of Caddo County).

== History ==
The Waco were a division of the Wichita people, called Iscani or Yscani in the early European reports, kinsmen to the Tawakoni people. The present-day Waco, Texas, is located on the site of their principal village, that stood at least until 1820. French explorer Jean-Baptiste Bénard de la Harpe travelled through the region in 1719, and the people he called the Honecha or Houecha could be the Waco. They are most likely the Quainco on Guillaume de L'Isle's 1718 map, Carte de la Louisiane et du Cours du Mississipi.

The Waco village on the Brazos River was flanked by two Tawakoni villages: El Quiscat and the Flechazos. In 1824, Stephen F. Austin wrote that the Waco village was 40 acres large, with 33 grass houses and about 100 men. They grew 200 acres of corn in fields enclosed by brush fences. As late as 1829, the village was protected by defensive earthworks. In 1837, the Texas Rangers planned to establish a fort at Waco village, but abandoned the idea after several weeks. In 1844, a trading post was established 8 miles south of the village. The anthropologist Jean-Louis Berlandier recorded 60 Waco houses in 1830.

The tribe had a second, smaller village located on the Guadalupe River.

In 1835, 1846, and 1872, the tribe signed treaties with the United States and the Wichita. The 1872 treaty established a reservation for them in Indian Territory, to which they were removed. In 1902, under the Dawes Allotment Act, the reservation lands were broken into individual allotments, and the Wacos became citizens of the United States. Today, they are part of the Wichita and Affiliated Tribes.

== Culture ==
The tribe lived in beehive-shaped houses, with pole supports, typically covered with rushes, but sometimes buffalo hides. The houses stood 20 to 25 feet tall. Besides corn, Wacos also grew beans, melons, peach trees, and pumpkins.

Waco descendants and other citizens of the Wichita and Affiliated Tribes are partnering with cultural organizations in Waco, Texas, educate the public about Waco history and create new opportunities for the city to work with Wichita people.

== Language ==
The Waco people spoke a dialect called Waco, which is a branch of Wichita (one of the Caddoan languages). The dialect is extinct.

== Namesakes ==
The city of Waco, Texas, is named for the tribe, as probably is Hueco Springs (Waco Springs) near New Braunfels, Texas.
