= Pierre Indian Learning Center =

Tribal school in Pierre, South Dakota

Coordinates: 44°21′12″N 100°18′32″W

Information
- Other name: Pierre Indian School Learning Center
- Established: February 5, 1891; 135 years ago
- Grades: 1-8

Pierre Indian Learning Center (PILC), also known as Pierre Indian School Learning Center, is a grade 1-8 tribal boarding school in Pierre, South Dakota. It is affiliated with the Bureau of Indian Education (BIE).

== History ==
The PILC opened on February 5, 1891, with five students. Crystal Lindell of the Capital Journal wrote that "The Pierre Indian Learning Center might never have been built had the people of Pierre not been fighting to make the city the state capital." In 1895, the superintendents of the Indian schools at Pipestone, MN and Pierre, S.D., both went to the White Earth Reservation looking to enroll students. In 1904, the federal government bought an additional 300 acres (120 ha) of land for the school's use. In 1908, the enrollment count was 156. Eddie Welch, a PhD student in American Indian studies from Pierre who worked on a thesis related to the school, stated that at the time, the education at the school did not prepare its graduates to get jobs.

In October 1988, a group attending a meeting with 150 people, including ex-employees, asked the tribes that collectively control the school to remove board members and the school administrator due to various issues. In October 1988, a dormitory supervisor was fired for sending public letters addressing the issue. The former dormitory supervisor filed a lawsuit against the school on the basis that his freedom of speech was violated. In November 1988, the school settled the lawsuit, which meant the employee was not automatically retained but could reapply for a job if he wanted to.

In 2017, the family of a girl who attempted suicide and later died in the hospital in 2015 filed a lawsuit against the Bureau of Indian Education in federal court.

== Campus ==
Dormitory students are put into separate wings by gender and by elementary and middle school levels, so there are a total of four wings.

== Student body ==
In 2017, it had about 200 students from, in addition to South Dakota, Nebraska and North Dakota. Students originated from 15 reservations. Stephen Lee of the Capital Journal wrote that "Many of the students have special needs or are considered 'at-risk' students."

== See also ==
- Off-reservation boarding schools operated by the BIE
  - Chemawa Indian School
  - Flandreau Indian School
  - Riverside Indian School
  - Sherman Indian High School
- Off-reservation boarding schools operated by tribes
  - Circle of Nations Wahpeton Indian School
  - Sequoyah Schools
