= Sequoyah High School (Cherokee County, Oklahoma) =

Location
- Muskogee Ave; Park Hill (Tahlequah address), Oklahoma 74464; United States
- 35.848776°N 95.001982°W

Information
- Funding type: BIE grant
- Established: 1871
- Superintendent: Terry Heustis
- Principal: Clint Hall
- Staff: 26.14 (FTE)
- Grades: 7-12
- Gender: Coeducational
- Enrollment: 379 (2023-2024)
- Student to teacher ratio: 14.50
- Colors: Maroon, silver, and white
- Athletics conference: OSSAA 3A
- Sports: Baseball, basketball, cheerleading, cross country fast pitch softball, football, golf, powerlifting, slow-pitch softball, track, volleyball, wrestling
- Mascot: Indian
- Website: sequoyahschools.org

Sequoyah High School (also known as Sequoyah-Tahlequah) is a Native American boarding school serving students in grades 7 through 12, who are members of a federally recognized Native American tribe. The school is located in Park Hill, Oklahoma, with a Tahlequah post office address, and is a Bureau of Indian Education (BIE) grant school operated by the Cherokee Nation.

Sequoyah is one of two boarding high schools for Native Americans in Oklahoma. It is a part of Sequoyah Schools (Cherokee: ᏏᏉᏯ ᏗᏕᎶᏆᏍᏗ, romanized: Siquoya Dideloquasdi).

== Background ==
Sequoyah Schools also has an elementary school grades pre-school through 8. Students in pre-school through grade 6 at the Cherokee Immersion School learn in Cherokee then begin to transition to instruction in English in grade 5.

In 2007 Jeff Raymond of The Oklahoman stated that the school was known to ethnic Cherokee people living throughout the United States.

== History ==
The school was founded in 1871 by the Cherokee National Council as the Cherokee Orphan Asylum to care for the numerous orphans who came out of the American Civil War. The first building on the current site of the school was erected in 1875.

The Cherokee National Council gave permission for acting Chief William Charles Rogers to sell the property (which included 40 acres (160,000 m^{2}) plus the buildings) to the United States Department of the Interior for a sum of $5,000 in 1914. In 1925, the name of the school was changed to Sequoyah Orphan Training School to memorialize Sequoyah, a noted Cherokee who invented the Cherokee syllabary.

For a short time, the school was also known as Sequoyah Vocational School. During much of its early years, the school boasted an active dairy and various other farming and agricultural facilities. It was operated by the Bureau of Indian Affairs as a boarding school until 1985.

In November 1985 the Cherokee Nation resumed operations at Sequoyah High School from the Bureau of Indian Affairs and now operates under a grant. The school now maintains 90 acres (360,000 m^{2}) of land and more than a dozen major buildings five miles (8 km) southwest of Tahlequah, Oklahoma.

Jolyn Choate began working as principal circa 2012.

In 2020 the school had a lack of teachers who focused on mathematics and science.

Patrick Moore served as the superintendent until he resigned in 2020.

== Campus ==
The school is on 90 acres (36 ha) of land, in unincorporated Cherokee County. It is 5 miles (8.0 km) southwest of Tahlequah, and has a Tahlequah postal address.

In 2003 its cafeteria had a capacity of 280 and the overall campus was designed for about 300 students.

The dormitories are only open to students at the high school levels.

== Admissions and operations ==
In order to be admitted a student must possess a Certificate of Degree of Indian Blood to show membership in a Federally Recognized Tribe. As of 2007 there are no other hard requirements for attending.

In 2007 Raymond stated that the school had competitive admissions with a wait list and that "today's students clamor to get into Sequoyah".

The tribal government and the BIE fully finance the school's operations, so no tuition charges are levied against students.

== Curriculum ==
The school has specialized courses pertaining to the Cherokee people, including those on the tribe's history, the arts, the Cherokee language and other aspects of the tribal culture. As of 2007 the State of Oklahoma requires each high school student to complete 23 credits, but the school requires each of its students to complete 28.

== Demographics ==
School enrollment is approximately 430 students, with 47% male and 53% female students. The teacher-student ratio is 1:15. 100% of the student population is American Indian, compared to Oklahoma's state average of 18% American Indian students.

In 2007 there were 436 students, with over 100 living on campus. In 2006 there were 360 students.

In 2003 there were 363 students, which at the time was an enrollment high. These students originated from 16 states, and were members of 39 tribes. At the time the campus was built to accommodate about 300 students.

== Athletics ==
The mascot is the Indian. Circa September 2005 there were rumors that the school would change the name of the mascot to the eagle. Chad Smith, the Principal Chief of the tribe, issued an executive order stating that the mascot would remain the same so long as the school board agrees. In 2006 Gina Stanley, the superintendent of Cherokee Schools, stated that the mascot has a positive reception among the students.

=== State championships ===
Sequoyah High School has won 21 state championships in seven sports:

Powerlifting – 2016

Boys Basketball – 2003

Girls Basketball – 2005, 2006, 2007, 2015, 2017, 2018

Boys Cross Country – 1964, 1965, 1969, 1993, 1995, 2003, 2004, 2005, 2006

Girls Cross Country – 1992, 2005

Slow Pitch Softball – 2012

Fast Pitch Softball – 2018

== Notable alumni ==
- Angel Goodrich, WNBA basketball player
- Jackson Narcomey, painter and printmaker
- Nathan Stanley, American football player
- Ryan Helsley, pitcher for the New York Mets

== See also ==
- Off-reservation boarding schools operated by the BIE
  - Chemawa Indian School
  - Flandreau Indian School
  - Riverside Indian School
  - Sherman Indian High School
- Off-reservation boarding schools operated by tribes
  - Circle of Nations Wahpeton Indian School
  - Pierre Indian Learning Center
