= Circle of Nations Wahpeton Indian School =

School in Wahpeton, North Dakota

Coordinates: 46.274293488462874°N 96.61115703917655°W

Circle of Nations Wahpeton Indian School, formerly Wahpeton Indian School, is a tribally-controlled grade 4-8 school in Wahpeton, North Dakota.

It is affiliated with the Bureau of Indian Education (BIE). It is not on an Indian reservation.

== History ==
The United States Congress passed a law establishing the school in 1904, with Porter James McCumber of North Dakota championing the law. President of the United States Theodore Roosevelt signed the act into law. The school began taking students in 1908. Its first classes were held in February, and it was controlled by the Bureau of Indian Affairs (BIA).

The school previously used harsh discipline that was used in various Indian boarding schools in the United States. In 1929, area businesspersons investigated the school after receiving reports of starvation. In 1947 the BIA initially was to close the school, but instead kept it open with reduced enrollment.

There were plans to close the school in 1985.

In 1992 U.S. House member Byron Dorgan received reports from a counselor at Wahpeton related to abuse, and Dorgan reported them to the BIA. By 1993 the federal and North Dakota governments investigated matters at the school.

In June 1993 it became a tribally controlled school as the Wahpeton Indian School Board, Incorporated assumed ownership of the school, and from that point forward the Office of Indian Education Programs (OIEP), later called the Bureau of Indian Education (BIE), began providing grants. The school received its current name in 1994.

In 1994 the BIA released a report regarding conditions at the school. Kent Conrad, a U.S. Senator from the state, dismissed it, calling it "a sham and a whitewash."

By the 1990s, the people overseeing the school were former students, who would go on to prohibit verbal or physical abuse.

In 2018 Tanner Rabbithead became the CEO and Trevor Gourneau became the principal.

== Student body ==
Its students originate from 18 states, with 33 tribes represented.

As of 1982 many of the students come from situations with food insecurity and/or school absenteeism. In some cases families with domestic problems send their children to Wahpeton so that when the situations are resolved, the children may return and the family may save face, versus the loss of reputation and permanency from foster care.

== See also ==
- Off-reservation boarding schools operated by the BIE
  - Chemawa Indian School
  - Flandreau Indian School
  - Riverside Indian School
  - Sherman Indian High School
- Off-reservation boarding schools operated by tribes
  - Pierre Indian Learning Center
  - Sequoyah Schools
- Sisseton Wahpeton Oyate
