= Flandreau Indian School =

Boarding school in Moody County, South Dakota

Coordinates: 44.0611°N 96.5929°W

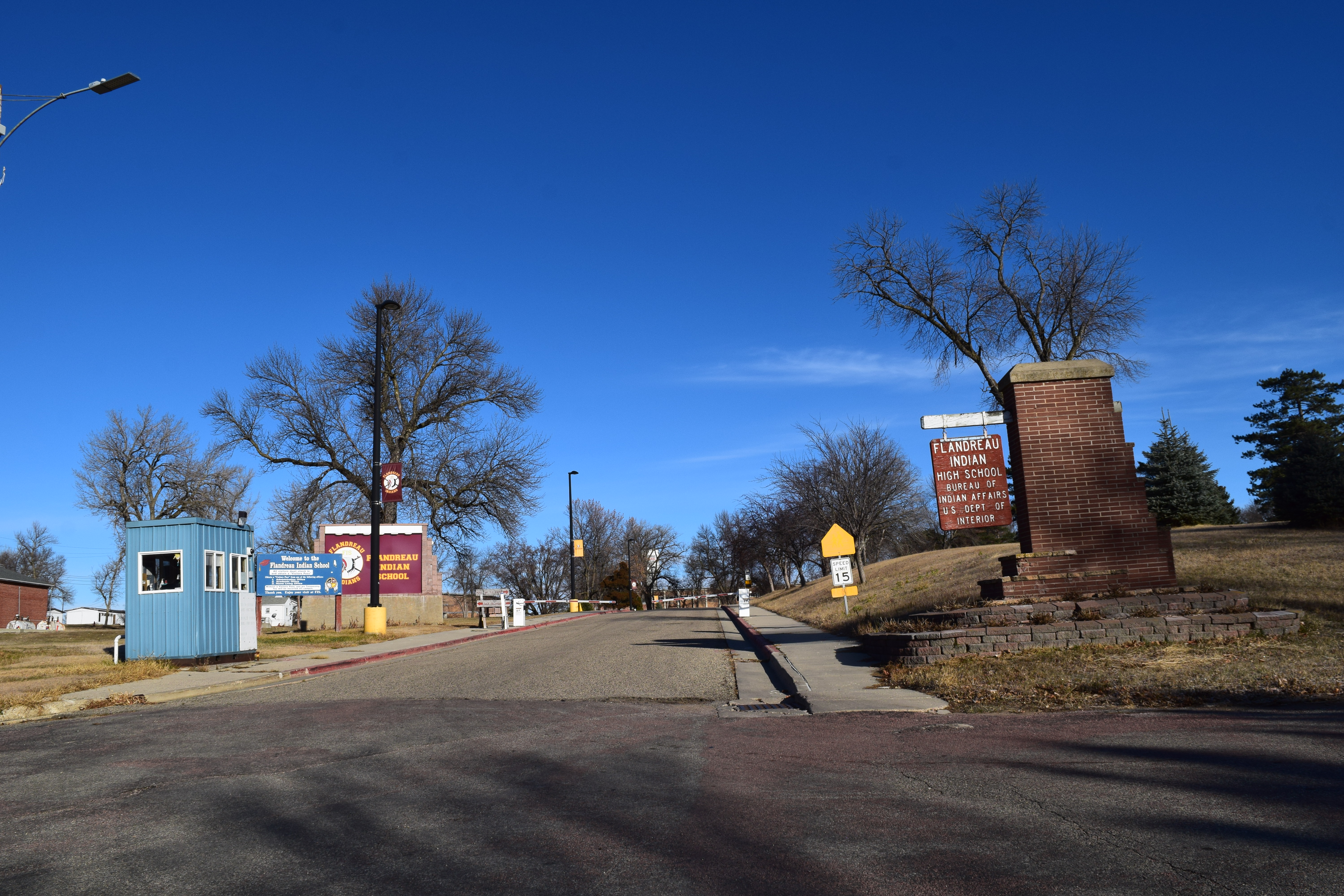

Information
- School type: Native American boarding school
- Established: 1872
- School board: Bureau of Indian Education
- Grades: 9-12
- Enrollment: 279 (2015)
- Website: fis.bie.edu

Flandreau Indian School (FIS), previously Flandreau Indian Vocational High School, is a boarding school for Native American children (primarily Lakota) in unincorporated Moody County, South Dakota, adjacent to Flandreau. It is operated by the Bureau of Indian Education (BIE) and is off-reservation.

It is one of four such off-reservation boarding schools directly operated by the BIE. It offers grades 9–12. Established in 1872 as a Presbyterian mission school, it is the oldest continuously operating Indian boarding school in the United States.

== History ==
The Presbyterian Church established this as a mission school in 1872, serving grades 1–6. The federal government took over operations in 1877 and opened dormitories in 1892 for boarding students. High school classes were later added. In the 1940s the Lakota campaigned to close the school but it did not succeed. Since the mid-20th century, public school districts and tribally controlled schools have provided education to more Native American students. BIE funding decreased for this and similar schools after a change of rules in 2004. Many facilities were closed and staff were laid off.

In the 19th and early 20th centuries, such federal boarding schools were intended to assimilate Native American students into the dominant Anglo-American culture: teaching English, Christianity, and European American culture. By the early 21st century, many federal schools had become centers of second chances, assisting students who were orphaned, had learning problems, or difficult home lives.

== Admissions ==
It is open to children who are members of federally recognized tribes. In 2002 the school admitted 95% of applicants. Those who were not admitted were generally limited to children with disabilities which the school could not accommodate.

== Operations ==
The federal government covers the cost of classes, room and board for students. This is part of its treaty obligations related to establishing the reservations and peace after the Indian Wars.

== Student body ==
In 1972 there were about 600 students. In 2002 there were 370 students.

In 2002 most students attending Flandreau were seeking environments more stable than those at home. Some are legacy students, with a history of other family members having attended. A third group seek a new environment for the "adventure", as Matt Baney of the Argus Leader reports.

In 2015 Flandreau School had 279 students; while the majority were from South Dakota, there were 34 from Nebraska and 7 from Iowa.

== Athletics ==
The athletic teams are called the Indians. Erin Grace of the Omaha World-Herald wrote in 2015 that "It is a word used gingerly around here."

In 1989 the school was in South Dakota athletics class AA. It did not have an American football team. That year it requested to be in class A.

== See also ==
- Off-reservation boarding schools operated by the BIE
  - Chemawa Indian School, Salem, Oregon
  - Riverside Indian School, Oklahoma
  - Sherman Indian High School, California
- Off-reservation boarding schools operated by tribes
  - Circle of Nations Wahpeton Indian School
  - Pierre Indian Learning Center
  - Sequoyah Schools
