= John Emhoolah Jr. =

Kiowa activist (1929–2021)

John Emhoolah Jr. (October 12, 1929 – April 21, 2021) was a Kiowa activist known for his work on Native American education in the Seattle and Denver areas.

Emhoolah pioneered the Native American studies program at the University of Washington and founded and led numerous organizations dedicated to Indian education and culture across a 50-year career. In 2021, a branch of the Denver Public Library was named in his honor.

== Early life, education, and military service ==
John Emhoolah Jr. was born in 1929 in Lawton, Oklahoma, and grew up around Anadarko. A member of the Kiowa nation who also had Arapaho roots, he was given the Kiowa name Pbonh Goot Thay ("Yellow Bead"). He was a descendent of survivors of the 1864 Sand Creek Massacre.

After graduating from Riverside Indian School, an American Indian boarding school, he attended Wichita State University, then Colorado State University, where he graduated with a bachelor's degree in education. From 1950 to 1952, he served in the Korean War as a member of the U.S. Army's 45th Infantry Division. He gained the nickname "Thunderbird Man" due to his service, after the division's nickname.

== Career and activism ==
In his early post-military career, Emhoolah worked as a draftsman engineer at Boeing in Kansas and Washington. However, he became best known for his 50-year career working on Indian education, Native American studies, and Indigenous activism, which in 2008 earned him the National Indian Education Association's Elder of the Year Award. His work in this field began in 1970 with his appointment as director of the Seattle Public Schools Indian Education Program. He later served as assistant dean at Green River College and taught at the University of Washington, where he founded the Native American studies program. His work in the Seattle area also included co-founding and serving as inaugural chair of both United Indians of All Tribes and the Seattle Indian Health Board, as well as president of the Northwest Inter-Tribal Club.

He then moved to Denver in 1975, to work for the American Indian Higher Education Consortium on procuring funding to found and support tribal colleges. Over his career in the Denver area, he became a prominent leader of the Indian community there, helping to found the Denver March Powwow, directing the Denver Indian Center, and chairing the Denver Museum of Nature and Science's Native American Resource Group. After a stint as deputy tribal administrator of his native Kiowa nation, which he remained deeply involved with throughout his life, he served from 1997 until his retirement as director of the Indian education program for the Adams 12 Five Star Schools in the Denver area.

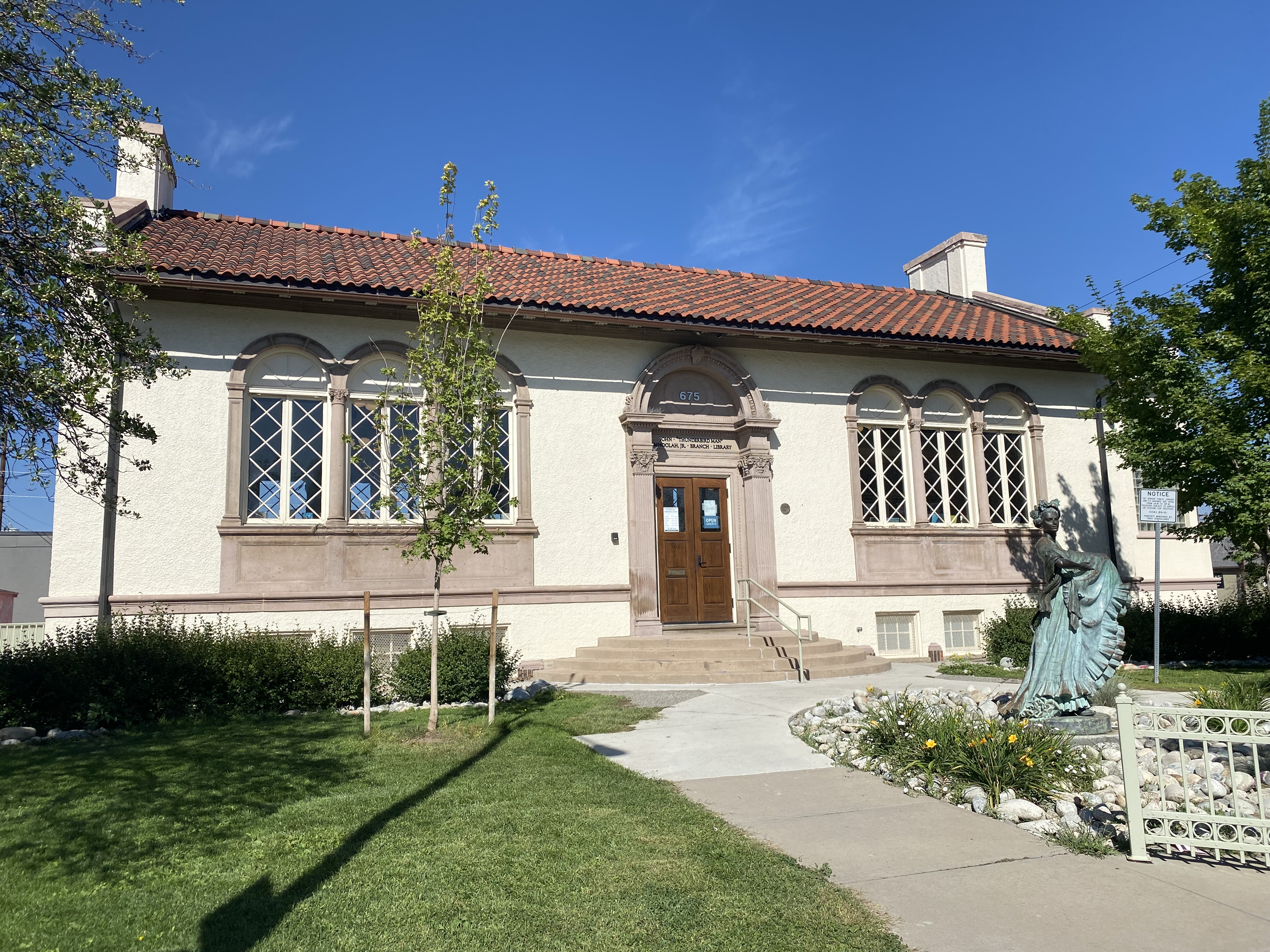
The John "Thunderbird Man" Emhoolah, Jr. Branch Library in Denver, Colorado.

His national-level activism also included serving on the advisory committee for the creation of the National Native American Veterans Memorial in Washington, D.C.

== Death and legacy ==
Emhoolah died in Thornton, Colorado, in 2021 at age 91. Later that year, a branch of the Denver Public Library was renamed in his honor, as decided by a public vote. The John "Thunderbird Man" Emhoolah, Jr. Branch Library had previously been named for William Byers, the founder of the Rocky Mountain News, who had vociferously defended the Sand Creek Massacre that targeted Emhoolah's ancestors.
