= Tawakoni =

Indigenous tribe in the United States

tawá:kharih (Wichita)
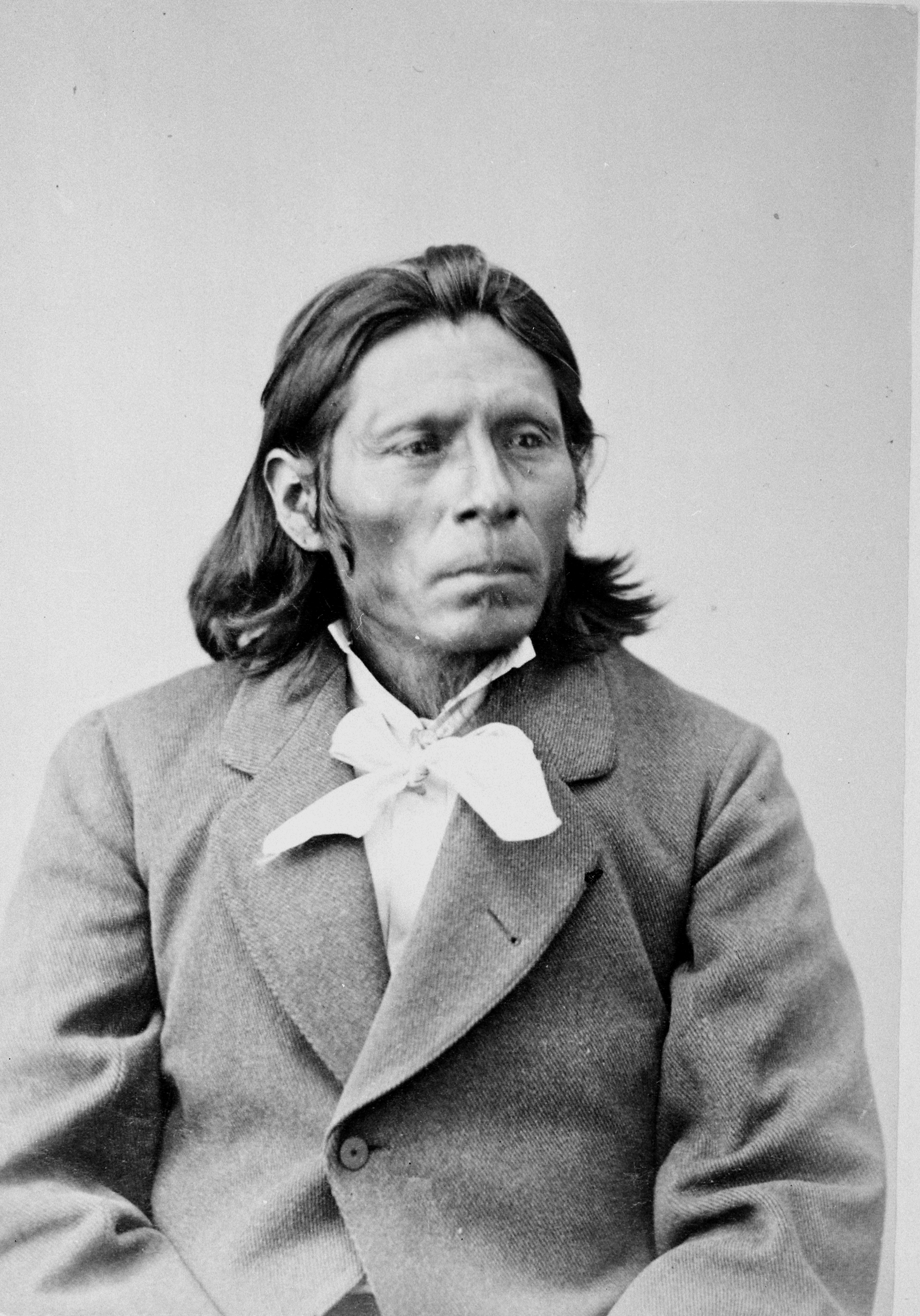
- Dave, a Tawakoni man, 1872

Total population
- fewer than 2,953 (2018)

Regions with significant populations
- Oklahoma, historically Kansas and Texas

Languages
- English, formerly Wichita

Religion
- Native American Church, Christianity, indigenous religion

Related ethnic groups
- Caddo, Pawnee, other Wichita and Affiliated Tribes

The Tawakoni (Wichita: tawá:kharih; also Tahuacano and Tehuacana) are a Southern Plains Native American tribe, closely related to the Wichitas. They historically spoke a Wichita language of the Caddoan language family. Currently, they are enrolled in the Wichita and Affiliated Tribes, a federally recognized tribe.

== History ==
At the beginning of the 18th century, the Tawakoni lived in villages in what is now Oklahoma and Texas. In his 1719 expedition, French explorer Jean Baptiste Bénard de La Harpe encountered a Tawakoni village in present-day Muskogee County, Oklahoma. The French wrote that the Tawakoni raised maize and tobacco. La Harpe negotiated a peace treaty between the Tawakoni, eight other tribes, and the French government. Hostilities with the Osage pushed the tribe south into Texas.

In Texas, the Tawakoni were closely allied with the Waco tribe. Until 1770, they were friendly to the French but hostile to the Spanish. Chief Quiscat traveled to San Antonio in 1772 to try to make peace with the Spanish, but this did not have a lasting effect. European-American settlers fought with the tribes in the 1820s, and disease and warfare had dramatically reduced their numbers. Stephen F. Austin's colonization efforts drove the tribes out from central Texas. The Tawakoni helped convince the Comanche and the Wichita to sign a peace treaty with the United States government, which became the first treaty signed between Plains Indians and the US. In 1835, they signed a treaty with the United States at Camp Holmes. This was the first time they were included with the Wichita peoples, a practice that continued in subsequent treaties, signed in 1837 and 1846.

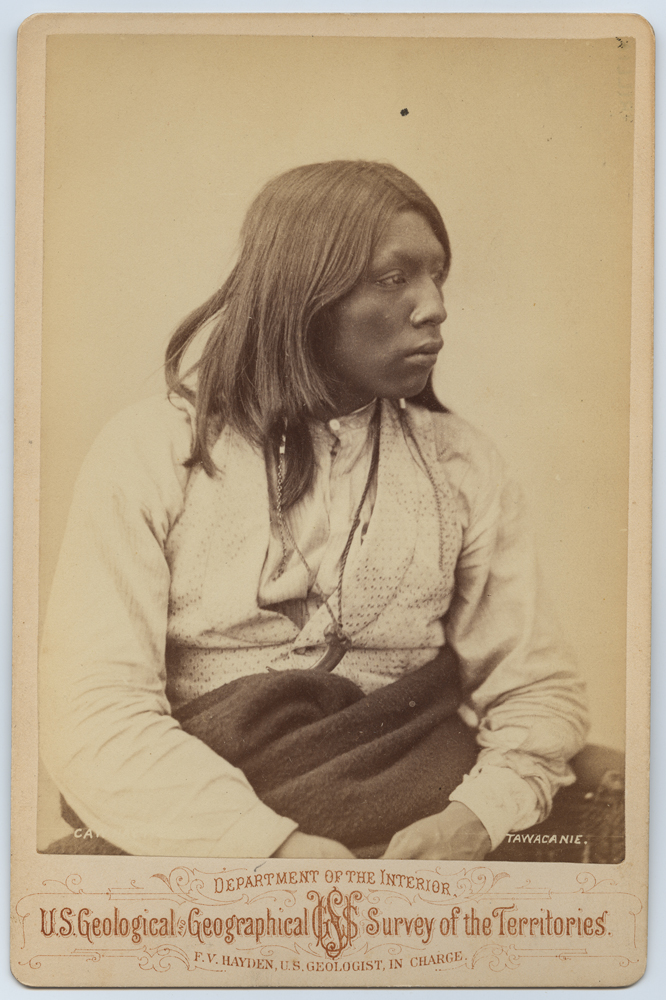
Cawhacitsca, a Tawakoni man and son of Dave, 1872

In 1853 an Indian reservation was established on the upper Brazos River in Texas, but settlers ultimately forced the tribes off the reservation. In August 1859, 258 Tawakoni people were forced to relocate to Indian Territory. With the Wichita, Waco, Caddo, Nadaco, Kichai, and Hainai tribes, the Tawakoni settled on a reservation in 1872 between the Canadian and Washita Rivers.

Although these tribes resisted the allotment policy outlines in the Dawes Act, their reservation was broken into individual allotments, and "surplus" lands were opened to non-Native settlers on August 6, 1901.

In 1894, 126 Tawakoni people were recorded. Under the 1934 Oklahoma Indian Welfare Act, they joined other Wichita peoples in organizing a new tribal government.

== Name ==
The Tawakonis' name translates to "river bend among red sand hills." Their name has been also spelled as Touacara, Tahwaccaro, Tahuacaro, or Towoccaro, Tehuacana, as well as Towakoni. Some French explorers called them the "Three Canes" or Troiscanne.

== Namesakes ==
Lake Tawakoni in Texas was named for this tribe. East Tawakoni, West Tawakoni and Quinlan, Texas are cities around this large lake. Also out of its dam comes the Sabine River which flows through northeast Texas and even works as the eastern border of Texas (From Center to Port Arthur, Texas). Tehuacana Creek, Tehuacana Hills, and Tehuacana, Texas are also named for this tribe, though using a Spanish spelling.
