= Gomeo Bobelu =

Zuni artist and activist

- Born: Gomeo Zacharius Neil Bobelu; December 25, 1964; Zuni Pueblo
- Died: November 16, 2022 (aged 57); Santa Fe, New Mexico
- Resting place: Zuni Pueblo; 35°4′10″N 108°50′48″W
- Education: Riverside Indian School
- Known for: lapidary jewelry, silversmithing, social justice advocacy
- Partner: Gregory Leon Baird
- Children: 2
- Awards: Wheelwright Museum of the American Indian, Goodman Fellowship Award, 2006

Gomeo Bobelu (December 25, 1964–November 16, 2022), was a Zuni (Badger Clan and Child of the Corn Clan) lapidary jeweler and silversmith who was known for his gemstone-inlayed silver jewelry. He was also a social justice advocate.

== Early life ==
Bobelu was born at Zuni Pueblo into a family of artists and farmers. He was educated at the Riverside Indian School in Anadarko, Oklahoma. Bobelu served in the audiovisual services and graphic design division of the U.S. Air Force.

== Work ==
Bobelu was known for his silversmithing and lapidary jewelry. He considered his work to be a "tribute to the victims and survivors of suicide and domestic abuse on our Indian reservations." His work as an artist was associated with the Santa Fe Indian Market and the Southwestern Association for Indian Arts. His inlaid pieces included turquoise and other stones, fossilized ivory, ironwood, and shell. He worked in a color palette reminiscent of the early 1900s. His work was exhibited in 2010, 2011 and 2012 at the Heard Museum.

Bobelu was a collaborator on the 2018 film, Veiled Lightning, along with Natachee Momaday Gray, Ashley Browning, Tezbah Gaussoin, and others. The film used archival footage, along with interviews and news footage to explore the ways protest movements in the Southwest can support environmental justice and fight oppression and genocide.

In 2006, the Wheelwright Museum of the American Indian awarded Bobelu with the Goodman Fellowship Award

He lived and worked in Santa Fe, New Mexico and at Zuni Pueblo. He was a Zuni tribal elder, and the father of two daughters, and grandfather to 5 grandchildren.

=== Advocacy ===
In addition to his work as a silversmith and jeweler, Bobelu was also a social justice advocate and human rights. He worked as the cultural liaison, environmental advocate and performance coordinator of The Way of the Rain, Inc. (TWOTR), an organization that advocated for environmental issues, and ecosystems, as well as battling against racism, colonialism and missing and murdered Indigenous women and relatives (MMIWR).

=== Death ===
Bobelu was murdered in 2022. He was given a traditional Zuni wake, and received full U.S. Airforce military honors.

=== Legacy ===
A 2023 documentary film was made about Bobelu's life and his work fighting against discrimination and adversity. The film was directed by Jaima Chevalier, and was produced by AJ Goldman (Diné, Taos and Jemez Pueblos) It screened at numerous venues including the New Mexico History Museum and the Santa Fe Film Festival.
