= Anadarko, Oklahoma =

City in Oklahoma, US

Anadarko, Oklahoma ista:hiʔiskhah (Wichita)
- City
- City of Anadarko
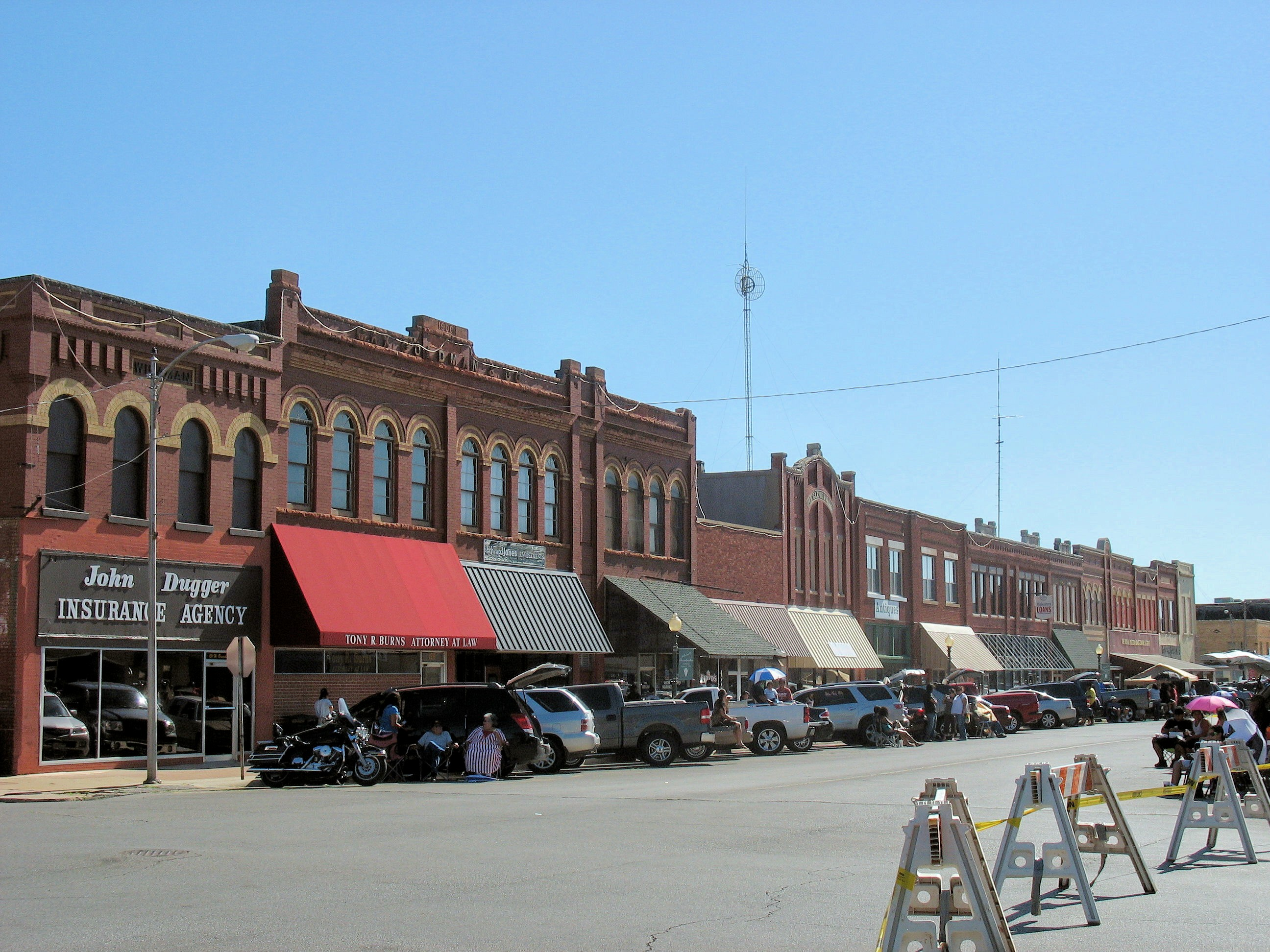
- Downtown Anadarko, Oklahoma

- Flag Seal
- Motto: "Indian Capital of the Nation"
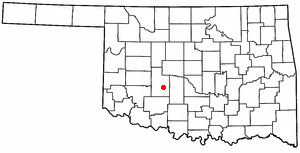
- Location of Anadarko, Oklahoma
- Coordinates: 35°03′55″N 98°14′39″W
- Country: United States
- State: Oklahoma
- County: Caddo

Area
  - Total: 7.18 sq mi (18.59 km^{2})
  - Land: 7.10 sq mi (18.40 km^{2})
  - Water: 0.073 sq mi (0.19 km^{2})
- Elevation: 1,178 ft (359 m)

Population (2020)
  - Total: 5,745
  - Density: 809/sq mi (312.2/km^{2})
- Time zone: UTC-6 (Central (CST))
  - Summer (DST): UTC-5 (CDT)
- ZIP code: 73005
- Area codes: 405/572
- FIPS code: 40-02050
- GNIS feature ID: 2409703
- Website: City Website

Anadarko (Wichita: ista:hiʔiskhah) is a city in and the county seat of Caddo County, Oklahoma, United States. The city is 50 miles (80.5 km) southwest of Oklahoma City. The population was 5,745 at the 2020 census.

== History ==
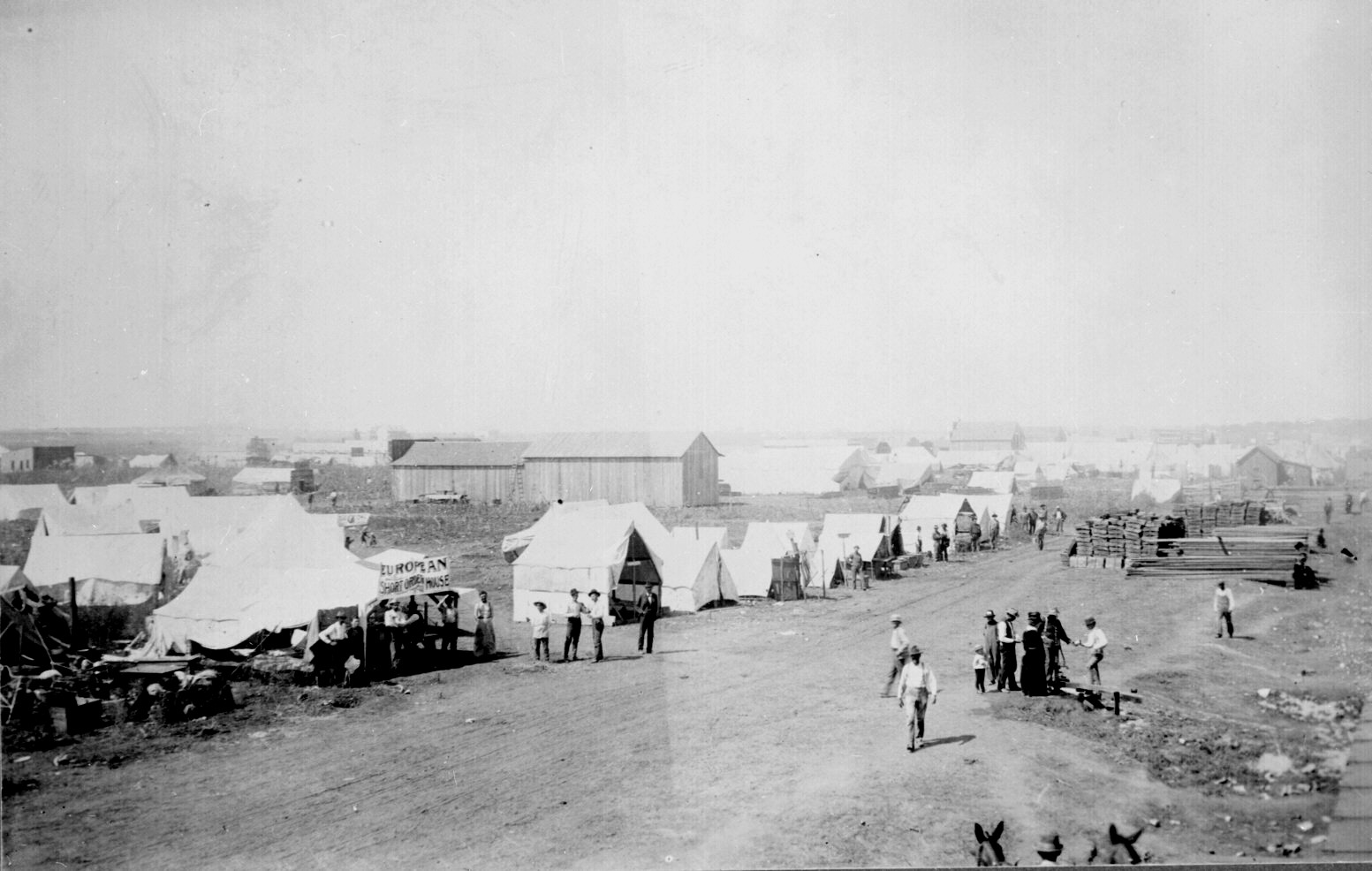
Anadarko Townsite, Oklahoma Territory, August 8, 1901. Tent city in the cornfield.

Anadarko got its name when its post office was established in 1873. The designation came from the Nadaco Native Americans, a branch of the Caddo people, and the "A" was added due to a clerical error.

In 1871, the Wichita Agency was reestablished on the north bank of the Washita River after being destroyed in the American Civil War. The Wichita Agency administered the affairs of the Wichita, Caddo and other tribes. In 1878, the Kiowa-Comanche Agency at Fort Sill was consolidated with the Wichita Agency.

In 1901, the federal government confiscated the lands of the Kiowa, Comanche and Arapaho Reservations, and opened the surplus land to white settlement. On August 6, 1901, an auction was held for homesteads and town lots. Around 5,000 people were living in "Rag Town" on the east edge of Anadarko awaiting the auction. Although 20,000 people were present for auction day, Anadarko's population dwindled to 2,190 in 1907.

Agriculture has been the principal driver of the local economy, since the Washita Valley has been good for crops and livestock. The second pillar of the local economy has been Native American affairs.

== Listing as National Register of Historic Places ==
Anadarko Downtown Historic District was designated as a National Register of Historic Places with the National Park Service on December 10, 1990.

☆ Media related to Anadarko Downtown Historic District at Wikimedia Commons

== Geography ==
=== Climate ===
Climate data for Anadarko, Oklahoma
Month	Jan	Feb	Mar	Apr	May	Jun	Jul	Aug	Sep	Oct	Nov	Dec	Year
Record high °F (°C)	84 (29)	89 (32)	97 (36)	101 (38)	104 (40)	110 (43)	111 (44)	111 (44)	108 (42)	99 (37)	88 (31)	89 (32)	111 (44)
Mean daily maximum °F (°C)	48 (9)	55 (13)	63 (17)	72 (22)	80 (27)	88 (31)	94 (34)	93 (34)	85 (29)	74 (23)	60 (16)	50 (10)	72 (22)
Mean daily minimum °F (°C)	22 (−6)	27 (−3)	35 (2)	45 (7)	56 (13)	64 (18)	68 (20)	67 (19)	60 (16)	47 (8)	34 (1)	25 (−4)	46 (8)
Record low °F (°C)	−13 (−25)	−6 (−21)	−9 (−23)	19 (−7)	29 (−2)	42 (6)	49 (9)	45 (7)	29 (−2)	16 (−9)	9 (−13)	−17 (−27)	−17 (−27)
Average precipitation inches (mm)	1.09 (28)	1.53 (39)	2.39 (61)	2.52 (64)	4.9 (120)	4 (100)	2.31 (59)	2.74 (70)	3.31 (84)	3.27 (83)	1.9 (48)	1.67 (42)	31.63 (798)
Average snowfall inches (cm)	2.2 (5.6)	1.9 (4.8)	1.3 (3.3)	1 (2.5)	0.3 (0.76)	0 (0)	0 (0)	0 (0)	0 (0)	0.1 (0.25)	0.9 (2.3)	2.2 (5.6)	9.9 (25.11)

== Demographics ==
Historical population
Census	Pop.	Note	%±
1910	3,439		—
1920	3,116		−9.4%
1930	5,036		61.6%
1940	5,579		10.8%
1950	6,184		10.8%
1960	6,299		1.9%
1970	6,682		6.1%
1980	6,378		−4.5%
1990	6,586		3.3%
2000	6,645		0.9%
2010	6,762		1.8%
2020	5,745		−15.0%
U.S. Decennial Census 2010 2020

=== 2020 census ===
As of the 2020 census, Anadarko had a population of 5,745. The median age was 36.5 years. 27.4% of residents were under the age of 18 and 15.6% of residents were 65 years of age or older. For every 100 females there were 93.3 males, and for every 100 females age 18 and over there were 89.7 males age 18 and over.

87.0% of residents lived in urban areas, while 13.0% lived in rural areas.

There were 2,094 households in Anadarko, of which 35.7% had children under the age of 18 living in them. Of all households, 35.2% were married-couple households, 18.9% were households with a male householder and no spouse or partner present, and 39.0% were households with a female householder and no spouse or partner present. About 30.1% of all households were made up of individuals and 12.8% had someone living alone who was 65 years of age or older.

There were 2,576 housing units, of which 18.7% were vacant. Among occupied housing units, 56.0% were owner-occupied and 44.0% were renter-occupied. The homeowner vacancy rate was 3.6% and the rental vacancy rate was 7.3%.

Racial composition as of the 2020 census
Race	Percent
White	30.4%
Black or African American	5.0%
American Indian and Alaska Native	47.0%
Asian	0.5%
Native Hawaiian and Other Pacific Islander	<0.1%
Some other race	2.8%
Two or more races	14.4%
Hispanic or Latino (of any race)	12.9%

=== 2010 census ===
There were 2,371 households, out of which 36.3% had children under the age of 18 living with them, 43.6% were married couples living together, 20.2% had a female householder with no husband present, and 30.6% were non-families. 27.1% of all households were made up of individuals, and 13.6% had someone living alone who was 65 years of age or older. The average household size was 2.72 and the average family size was 3.32.

In the city, the population was spread out, with 32.6% under the age of 18, 9.3% from 18 to 24, 25.8% from 25 to 44, 18.8% from 45 to 64, and 13.5% who were 65 years of age or older. The median age was 32 years. For every 100 females, there were 87.9 males. For every 100 females age 18 and over, there were 81.3 males.

The median income for a household in the city was $24,035, and the median income for a family was $27,633. Males had a median income of $26,063 versus $17,666 for females. The per capita income for the city was $12,062. About 23.3% of families and 28.5% of the population were below the poverty line, including 38.8% of those under age 18 and 18.5% of those age 65 or over.

== Culture ==
=== Native American significance ===
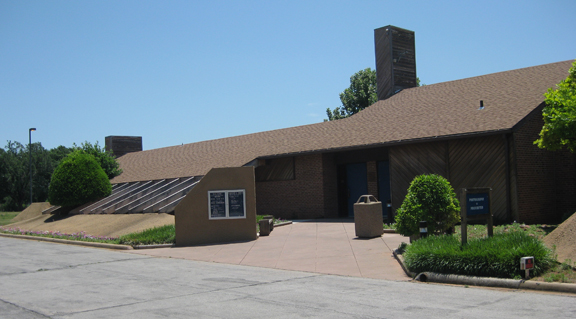
Southern Plains Indian Museum, operated by the US Department of the Interior's Indian Arts and Crafts Board

Anadarko, the self-titled "Indian Capital of the Nation." It is the capital of the Wichita and Affiliated Tribes, the Delaware Nation and the Apache Tribe of Oklahoma. The city houses the National Hall of Fame for Famous American Indians.

Anadarko is named after the Nadaco, a Caddo band now affiliated with the Caddo Nation. In the Caddo language, Nadá-kuh means "bumblebee place". The Caddo are a federally recognized Native American tribe for which Caddo County is named. Caddo County is part of the former reservation of the Caddo, Wichita, and Delaware Nation, prior to allotment in the post-Dawes Allotment Era.

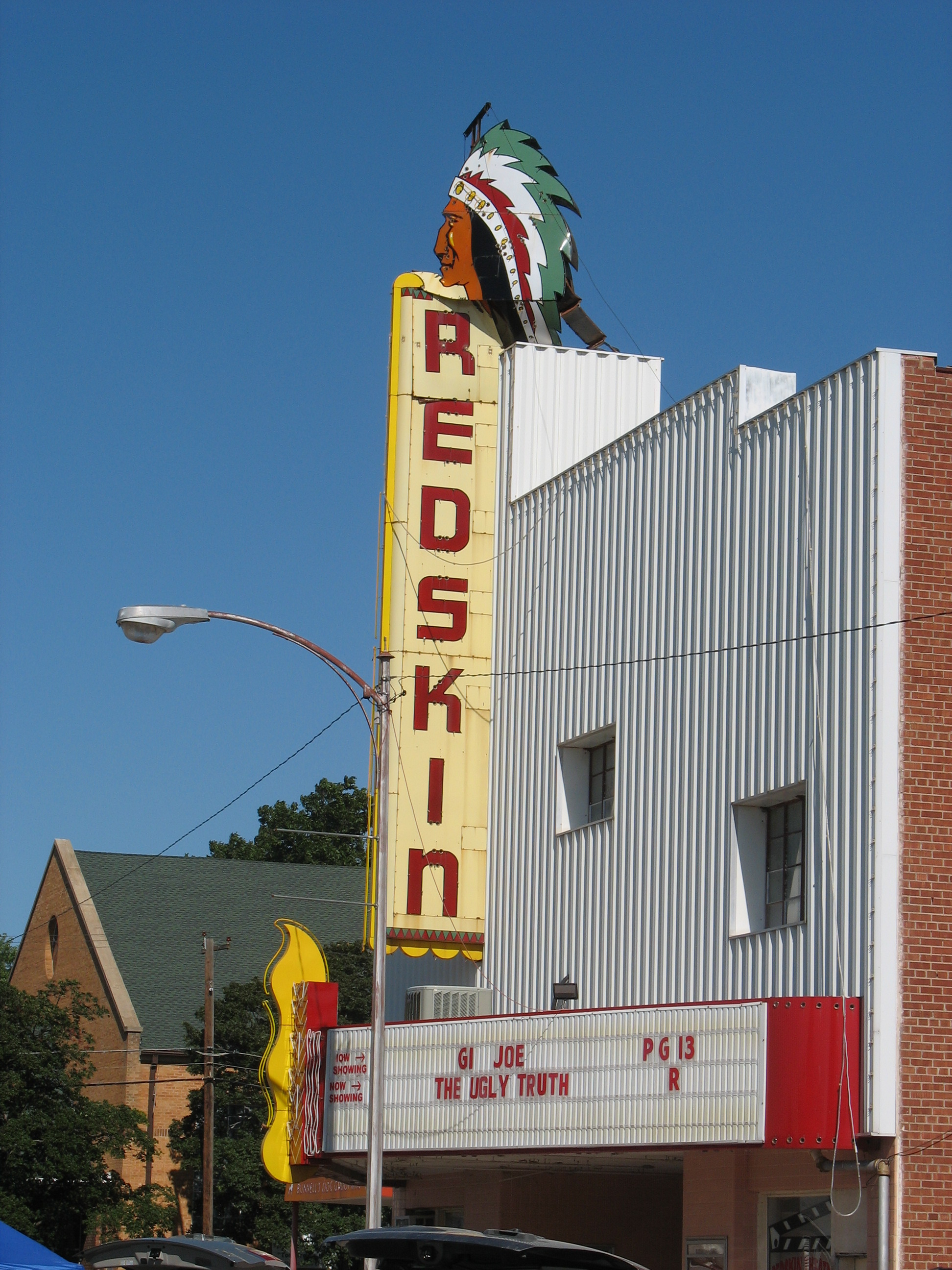
The Redskin Theater in Anadarko, Oklahoma. The town's population is 41% Native American.

Culturally, Anadarko is rare among Oklahoma cities as Native Americans form a near-majority. Locals are often familiar with a few basic Indian words, such as haw-nay, Kiowa for "no." Wichita and Apache words are sometimes employed in casual conversation as well, such as hangy, ah-ho, ebote, and bocote. Native American motifs are commonly used for design, art, and other aspects of daily life.

Anadarko has a Bureau of Indian Affairs office. The town is situated between the Wichita, Caddo, and Delaware reservations to the north, and the Kiowa, Comanche, and Apache reservations to the south. These reservations were dismantled by the allotment of tribal lands to individual members, and the opening of the "excess" lands to settlement, in a series of land openings. The area surrounded by Anadarko was opened to settlement by a 1901 land lottery affecting the Kiowa, Comanche, Wichita and Caddo lands.

The Anadarko area is home to Riverside Indian School, a Bureau of Indian Education boarding and day school for Native American students.

== Education ==
Anadarko Public Schools consists of three elementary schools, Sunset Elementary, East Elementary, and Mission Elementary; a middle school; and a high school. There are approximately 1,950 students.

Riverside Indian School is near Anadarko.

== Notable people ==
- Richard Aitson (1953–2022), a Kiowa-Kiowa Apache bead artist, curator, and poet
- Black Beaver (1806–1880), Delaware Native American leader, scout, and rancher
- Blackbear Bosin (1921–1980), Comanche-Kiowa artist
- John Emhoolah Jr. (1929–2021), Kiowa educational activist
- Ronald D. Godard, ambassador
- Derrell Griffith (b. 1943), former Major League Baseball player
- Ralph B. Hodges (1930–2013), former Chief Justice of the Oklahoma Supreme Court
- Genta H. Holmes (b. 1940), first United States Ambassador to Namibia
- Butch Huskey (b. 1971), former Major League Baseball player
- Charles Leonhard (1915–2002), music educator and academic
- Doris McLemore (1927–2016) last fluent speaker of the Wichita language
- Cal McLish (1925–2010), Major League Baseball player
- Stephen Mopope (1900–1974), Kiowa artist
- Gary Nixon (1941–2011), national champion motorcycle racer
- Ray Gene Smith (1928–2005), football player
- Jim Thompson (1906–1977), author and screenwriter
- Gene Tracy (1927–1979), comedian, emcee, and recording artist
- Louis Weller (1904–1979), National Football League player
