= Doris McLemore =

Last speaker of the Wichita language

Doris Lamar-McLemore
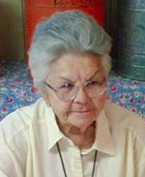
- McLemore in 2010
- Born: Doris Jean Lamar; April 16, 1927; Anadarko, Oklahoma, U.S.
- Died: August 30, 2016 (aged 89); Anadarko, Oklahoma, U.S.
- Occupation: Teacher (of Wichita language classes)
- Known for: Last native speaker of the Wichita language

Doris Jean Lamar-McLemore (April 16, 1927 – August 30, 2016) was an American teacher who was the last native speaker of the Wichita language, a Caddoan language spoken by the Wichita and Affiliated Tribes, indigenous to the U.S. states of Oklahoma and Texas.

== Early life ==
McLemore was born in 1927 in Anadarko, Oklahoma. Her mother was Wichita and her father was European-American. McLemore was raised by her fullblood Wichita maternal grandparents, and Wichita was her first language.

McLemore graduated from Riverside Indian School, an American Indian boarding school, in 1947 and worked as a house mother there for 30 years. She married twice and had a son and two daughters. In 1959 McLemore moved back to live near Gracemont, Oklahoma, to live among her relatives.

== Preservation of the Wichita language ==
In 1962, McLemore met David Rood, a linguist from the University of Colorado, and they collaborated to preserve the Wichita language.

McLemore taught language classes for the Wichita and Affiliated Tribes and before her death, was collaborating with linguist David Rood to create dictionary and language CDs.

"Doris is amazing for being able to retain as much as she does without having anyone to speak it to on a daily basis," said former Wichita tribal chairman, Gary McAdams. She died on August 30, 2016, at the age of 89.

== See also ==
- Tevfik Esenç, the last native speaker of Ubykh
- Ned Maddrell, the last native speaker of Manx
- Dolly Pentreath, the last native speaker of Cornish
- List of last known speakers of languages
