= Vertical vowel system =

Type of vowel system

IPA: Vowels

| | Front | Central | Back |
|---|---|---|---|
| Close | i y | ɨ ʉ | ɯ u |
| Near-close | ɪ ʏ | | ʊ |
| Close-mid | e ø | ɘ ɵ | ɤ o |
| Mid | e̞ ø̞ | ə | ɤ̞ o̞ |
| Open-mid | ɛ œ | ɜ ɞ | ʌ ɔ |
| Near-open | æ | ɐ |
| Open | a ɶ | ä | ɑ ɒ |

- IPA help
- audio
- full chart
- template

Legend: unrounded • rounded

A vertical vowel system is the system of vowels in a language that requires only vowel height to phonemically distinguish vowels. Theoretically, rounding, frontness and backness could also be used in one-dimensional vowel systems; however, vertical refers specifically to the usage of vowel height as the sole distinguishing feature.

Vertical vowel systems have only been uncovered in the underlying representation of various languages' phonology. Phonetically, all known natural languages employ both front and back vowels; however, in a vertical vowel system, the occurrence of front vs. back vowels is predictable, governed by one or more phonological processes.

Two different diachronic mechanisms may give rise to a vertical vowel system. In some cases, the front-back distinction may simply be lost when vowels are merged. This has occurred in Wichita, in which an old vowel /u/ (preserved in the related language Pawnee) has merged with /i/. However, the Wichita vowel system is not phonetically vertical, as /a/ is realised as open back, /e/ as open-mid front, and /i/ as close to close-mid front; hence, the feature [± back] is relevant to the phonetics of the language, even though it is not a salient phonological distinction. Similarly, the vowel [o] is heard in Wichita utterances, although this vowel is usually the phonetic result of a contraction of sequences of [short vowel + w + short vowel], a phenomenon also noted in other languages with vertical vowel systems.

More striking is a phenomenon whereby one or more phonological features of vowels are lost and reassigned to the consonants at the syllable periphery, leaving all vowels underspecified for frontness, rounding, or both. This has occurred in Arrernte, in which vowel rounding has been lost and consonantal labialisation gained as a result. All members of the Northwest Caucasian family have reassigned both rounding and frontness to the syllable periphery, the former surfacing as consonantal labialisation, and the latter as palatalisation. This has also occurred in Marshallese.

Some argue that the short vowels of Irish have similarly lost their frontness specification, forming a rudimentary vertical system. However, almost all Irish consonants appear in palatalised and non-palatalised forms, so the loss of frontness specification is viewed as a consequence, rather than a cause, of consonant palatalisation. Furthermore, the loss of frontness specification in Irish is limited to the short vowels of the language; the long vowels of Irish retain a front-back distinction. Marshallese also has front-back distinction for its long vowels, but these are phonemically sequences of /CVGVC/ where /G/ is a semiconsonant; for example, rooj 'rose' is broadly /rˠɛwɛtʲ/, but more narrowly [rˠɔːtʲ].

Zero-dimensional vowel systems, with one phonemic vowel only, have been postulated for Kabardian and some Abkhaz dialects, as well as several Central Chadic languages such as Moloko. A phonological analysis with no phonemic vowels at all has been shown to be possible for Mofu-Gudur.

Vertical vowel systems been noted for the following languages:

- Northwest Caucasian
  - Abkhaz (two degrees)
  - Adyghe (three degrees)
  - Kabardian (two, perhaps three degrees)
  - Ubykh (two, perhaps three degrees)
- Caddoan
  - Wichita (three degrees)
- Pama-Nyungan
  - Arrernte (two degrees)
- Austronesian
  - Marshallese (four degrees)
- Sepik–Ramu languages
- Goidelic
  - Irish (three degrees for short vowels only)
- Sinitic
  - Mandarin Chinese (two degrees, according to some analyses)

Kazakh, Mongolian and Tundra Nenets have vowel systems resembling a vertical vowel system in that backness is not phonemic; however, they are not one-dimensional. Backness has in Kazakh and Mongolian been reinterpreted as advanced tongue root, while in Tundra Nenets backness is determined according to the palatalization of adjacent consonants. Vowels are otherwise distinguished, in addition to height, by diphthongization and, in Kazakh and Tundra Nenets, rounding.

== Vowel prosody system ==
Complex interaction between a vertical vowel system and vowel harmony, known as a vowel prosody system, appears in many of the Central Chadic languages. One of the best known cases is Margi, but the phenomenon has been documented in more than thirty languages of the group altogether, including all or most languages of five geographically adjacent subgroups:

- Daba group: Buwal, Daba, Mbudum, Mina
- Hurza group: Mbuko, Vame
- Musgum group: Mbara, Muskum
- Mafa group: Cuvok, Mafa
- Mofu group: Dugwor, Gemzek, Mada, Merey, Mofu-Gudur, Moloko, Muyang, Ouldeme, Zulgo

Further examples of the system of the appear in e.g. Gidar and Podoko.

A typical feature for these languages is that vowel frontness or roundedness cannot be considered a segmental feature but is instead a suprasegmental feature, spanning an entire morpheme or phonological word. All Central Chadic languages allow frontness as a prosody and therefore contrast minimal pairs such as [dam] vs. [dem]; only some allow roundedness as a prosody, and in others, rounded vowels are found only next to labialized velar consonants.

== Horizontal vowel system ==
A purely horizontal vowel system, where phonemes contrast only in frontness-backness and height is irrelevant, is unattested in modern natural languages but may be reconstructed in Proto-Indo-European.

== Bibliography ==
- Bender, Byron W.; Capelle, Alfred; Pagotto, Louise (2016). Marshallese Reference Grammar. University of Hawaiʻi Press. p. 34. ISBN 978-0-8248-5993-0. "In some languages, such sounds are called semivowels or glides, but in Marshallese they are called semiconsonants because they behave more like consonants than like vowels."
- Friesen, Dianne (2017-07-11). A grammar of Moloko. Berlin: Language Science Press. ISBN 978-3-946234-63-0.
- Gravina, Richard (2014). The Phonology of Proto-Central Chadic (PhD). Leiden University. ISBN 978-94-6093-157-4.
- Kiparsky, Paul (2017). "Formal and empirical issues in phonological typology". In Hyman, Larry M.; Plank, Frans (eds.). Phonological Typology. De Gruyter.
- Salminen, Tapani (1997). Tundra Nenets inflection. Mémoires de la Société Finno-Ougrienne. Vol. 227. Helsinki: Suomalais-Ugrilainen Seura. pp. 36–37. ISBN 952-5150-02-X.
