= Gene Tracy =

American comedian and recording artist (1927–1979)

- Born: Ivan Eugene Morris; April 8, 1927; Anadarko, Oklahoma, U.S.
- Died: November 3, 1979 (aged 52); El Paso, Texas, U.S.

Comedy career
- Years active: 1930s–1979
- Medium: Records, film, radio, television
- Genres: Observational, Burlesque

Gene Tracy (born Ivan Eugene Morris) (April 8, 1927 – November 3, 1979) was an American comedian, emcee and recording artist.

== Life ==
After leaving home at an early age, Tracy (still called Morris) secured employment as a promoter for a regional circus called, "The Paul Miller Carnival." Tracy's duties included traveling ahead of the rest of the show to post promotional bills on the telephone poles in the towns the carnival was to perform.

Tracy's comedy career began after he was asked to perform at an event where the featured guest had failed to appear. Tracy filled in by relating a few of the jokes he had overheard in the various truck-stops he frequented while traveling. A radio station executive was present, and subsequently helped Tracy find bookings at other clubs in the Charlotte, N.C. area as "Gene" Morris. These appearances soon led to his second "discovery," this time by record producer Jerry Pettus, who signed Morris, and who suggested Morris' new "stage name" of "Gene Tracy."

Gene Tracy went on to record over 60 comedy albums in his career, selling more than 20 million albums, a vast majority of them on the then-popular 8-Track cartridge format. Tracy also appeared in several radio, television and film roles. He died of a heart attack in El Paso, Texas at the age of 52. Tracy was interred in Sunset Memory Gardens, a Tampa, Florida cemetery dedicated to circus folk.
