= Quiscat =

Quiscat was a prominent 18th century Native American tribal chief, whose ethnic community, the Tawakoni (also referred to as Towakoni), inhabited an area in what is now East Central Texas.

In 1772, Chief Quiscat embarked on a voyage to San Antonio in a bid to negotiate an end to hostilities with Spain which, between 1690 and 1821, had governed Texas as a colony named "Kingdom of Texas". Quiscat's name was subsequently appended to the primary Tawakoni village, located on the banks of the Brazos River, in the vicinity of present-day Waco, Texas. The village, also referred to by its Spanish name, "El Quiscat", was situated on the river's west side. It sat on a bluff overlooking an agglomeration of springs and, during the period, had approximately 750 inhabitants. The village was visited at least twice by outsiders—Athanase de Mézières came there in 1779, and Pedro Vial recovered from injuries for several weeks there in 1786. Reference to the village occurs as late as 1795; no available documentation exists detailing its ultimate fate.
