= Wichita language =

Extinct Native American language

Wichita
- Kirikirʔi꞉s
- Native to: United States
- Region: West-central Oklahoma
- Ethnicity: Wichita, Tawakoni
- Extinct: August 30, 2016, with the death of Doris McLemore
- Revival: Classes available
- Language family: Caddoan: Northern; Wichita
- Dialects: Waco; Tawakoni; Kirikirʔi꞉s

Language codes
- ISO 639-3: wic
- Glottolog: wich1260
- ELP: Wichita
- Linguasphere: 64-BAC
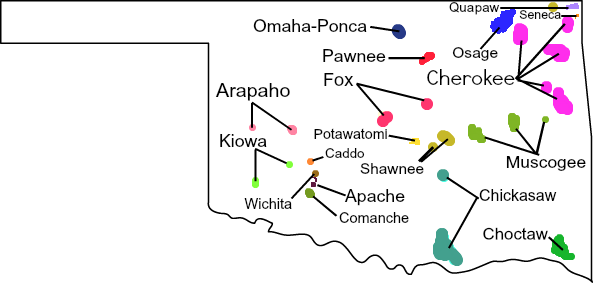
- Distribution of Native American languages in Oklahoma

Wichita, known natively as Kirikirʔi꞉s, is a Caddoan language that was spoken in Anadarko, Oklahoma, by the Wichita and Affiliated Tribes. The last fluent heritage speaker, Doris Lamar-McLemore, died in 2016. This has rendered Wichita functionally extinct; however, the tribe offers classes to revitalize the language and works in partnership with the Wichita Documentation Project of the University of Colorado, Boulder.

== Dialects ==
When the Europeans began to settle North America, Wichita separated into three dialects; Waco, Tawakoni, and Kirikirʔi꞉s (aka, Wichita Proper). However, when the language was threatened and the number of speakers decreased, dialect differences largely disappeared.

== Status ==
By 2008, Doris Lamar-McLemore was being referred to as the last known fluent speaker. She died on 30 August 2016. This is a sharp decline from the 500 speakers estimated by Paul L. Garvin in 1950.

== Classification ==
Wichita is a member of the Caddoan language family, along with modern Caddo, Pawnee, Arikara, and Kitsai.

== Phonology ==
The phonology of Wichita is unusual, with no pure labial consonants (though there are two labiovelars /kʷ/ and /w/). There is only one nasal (depending on conflicting theory one or more nasal sounds may appear, but all theories seem to agree that they are allophones of the same phoneme, at best), and possibly a three vowel system using only height for contrast.

=== Consonants ===
Wichita has 10 consonants. In the Americanist orthography generally used when describing Wichita, /t͡s/ is spelled ⟨c⟩, and /j/ is ⟨y⟩.

	Labial	Alveolar	Dorsal		Glottal
	Labial	Alveolar	plain	labial	Glottal
Plosive		t	k	kʷ	ʔ
Affricate		t͡s			
Fricative		s			h
Sonorant	(m)	ɾ ~ n	j	w	

Though neither Rood nor Garvin include nasals in their respective consonant charts for Wichita, Rood's later inclusion of nasals in phonetic transcription for his 2008 paper ("Some Wichita Recollections: Aspects of Culture Reflected in Language") support the appearance of at least /n/.

- Labials are generally absent, occurring in only two roots: kammac 'to grind corn' and camma꞉ci 'to hoe, to cultivate'.
- Apart from the /m/ in these two verbs, nasals are allophonic. The allophones [ɾ] and [n] are in complementary distribution: It is [n] before alveolars (/t, t͡s, s/ and in geminate [nn]) and initially before a vowel, and [ɾ] elsewhere. Thus its initial consonant clusters are [n] and [ɾ̥h], and its medial and final clusters are [nt͡s], [nt], [ns], [nn], [ɾʔ], [ɾh].
- Final r and w are voiceless: [ɾ̥], [w̥]
- One aspect of Wichita phonetics is the occurrence of glottalized final consonants. Taylor asserts that when a long vowel precedes a glottal stop, there is no change to the pronunciation. However, when the glottal stop is preceded by a short vowel, the vowel is eliminated. If the short vowel was preceded by a consonant, then the consonant is glottalized. Taylor hypothesizes that these glottalized final consonants show that the consonant was not originally a final consonant, that the proto form (an earlier language from which Wichita split off, that Taylor was aiming to reconstruct in his paper) ended in a glottal stop, and that a vowel has been lost between the consonant and glottal stop.

Original word ending	Change	Result	Wichita example
[Vːʔ#]	No change	[Vːʔ#]	
[VːVʔ#]	-[V]	[Vːʔ#]	[hijaːʔ] (snow)
[CVʔ#]	-[V]	[Cʔ#]	[kiːsʔ] (bone)

Vː - long vowel
V - short vowel
C - consonant
# - preceding sound ends word

- Taylor also finds that previous phonetic transcriptions have recorded the phoneme /t͡s/ (written ⟨c⟩), as occurring after /i/, while /s/ is recorded when preceded by /a/.
- The *kʷ, *w, *p merger; or Why Wichita Has No /p/:
  - In Wichita the sounds /kʷ/ and /w/ are not differentiated when they begin a word, and word-initial *p has become /w/. This is unusual, in that the majority of Caddoan languages pronounce words that used to begin with *w with /p/. In Wichita, the three sounds were also merged when preceded by a consonant. Wichita shifted consonant initial *p to /kʷ/ with other medial occurrences of *p. /kʷ/ and /w/ remain distinct following a vowel. For example, the word for 'man' is /wiːt͡s/ in Wichita, but /piːta/ in South Band Pawnee and /pita/ in Skiri Pawnee.

=== Phonological rules ===
- The coalescence of morpheme-final /ɾ/ and subsequent morpheme-initial /t/ or /s/ to /t͡s/:

ti-r-tar-s
IND-PL-cut-IMPERF
'he cut them'

a꞉ra-r-tar
PERF-PL-cut
'he has cut them'

a꞉ra-tar
PERF-cut
'he has cut it'

- /w/ changes to /kʷ/ whenever it follows a consonantal segment which is not /k/ or /kʷ/:

i-s-wa
IMP-you-go
'go!'

i-t-wa
IMP-I-go
'let me go!'

- /ɾ/ changes to /h/ before /k/ or /kʷ/. The most numerous examples involve the collective-plural prefix r- before a morpheme beginning with /k/:

ti-r-kita-re꞉sʔi
IND-COL-top-lie.INAN
'they are lying on top'

- /t/ with a following /s/ or /ɾ/ to give /t͡s/:

keʔe-t-rika꞉s-ti꞉kwi
FUT-I-head-hit
'I will hit him on the head'

- /t/ changes to /t͡s/ before /i/ or any non-vowel:

ta-t-r-taʔas
IND-I-COL-bite
'I bit them'

- /k/ changes to /s/ before /t/:

ti-ʔak-tariyar-ic
IND-PL-cut.randomly-repeatedly
'he butchered them'

- /ɾ/, /j/, and /h/ change to /s/ after /s/ or /t͡s/:

ichiris-ye꞉ckeʔe꞉kʔa
bird-ember
'redbird'

=== Vowels ===
Wichita has either three or four vowels, depending on analysis:

	Front	Back
Close	i ~ ɪ ~ e	(u ~ o)
Close-mid	i ~ ɪ ~ e	(u ~ o)
Open-mid	ɛ ~ æ	
Open	ɛ ~ æ	ɒ ~ a

These are transcribed as ⟨i, e, a, o/u⟩.

Word-final vowels are devoiced.

Though Rood employs the letter ⟨o⟩ in his transcriptions, Garvin instead uses ⟨u⟩, and asserts that /u/ is a separate phoneme. However, considering the imprecision in vowel sound articulation, what is likely important about these transcriptions is that they attest to a back vowel that is not low.

Taylor uses Garvin's transcription in his analysis, but theorizes a shift of *u to /i/ medially in Wichita, but does not have enough examples to fully analyze all the possible environments. He also discusses a potential shift from *a to /i/, but again, does not have enough examples to develop a definitive hypothesis. Taylor finds /ɛ/ only occurs with intervocalic glottal stops.

Rood argues that [o] is not phonemic, as it is often equivalent to any vowel + /w/ + any vowel. For example, /awa/ is frequently contracted to [óː] (the high tone is an effect of the elided consonant). There are relatively few cases where speakers will not accept a substitution of vowel + /w/ + vowel for [o]; one of them is [kóːs] 'eagle'.

Rood also proposes that, with three vowels that are arguably high, mid, and low, the front-back distinction is not phonemic, and that one may therefore speak of a 'vertical' vowel inventory (see below). This also has been claimed for relatively few languages, such as the Northwest Caucasian languages and the Ndu languages of Papua New Guinea.

There is clearly at least a two-way contrast in vowel length. Rood proposes that there is a three-way contrast, which is quite rare among the world's languages, although well attested for Mixe, and probably present in Estonian. However, in Wichita, for each of the three to four vowels qualities, one of the three lengths is rare, and in addition the extra-long vowels frequently involve either an extra morpheme, or suggest that prosody may be at work. For example,

nɪːt͡s.híːːʔɪh 'the strong one'
nɪːːt͡s.híːːʔɪh 'the strong ones'

hɛːhɪɾʔíːɾas 'let him find you'
hɛːːhɪɾʔíːɾas 'let him find it for you'

háɾah 'there'
háːɾɪh 'here it is' (said when handing something over)
háːːɾɪh 'that one'

(Note that it is common in many languages to use prosodic lengthening with demonstratives such as 'there' or 'that'.)

This contrasts with Mixe, where it is easy to find a three-way length contrast without the addition of morphemes.

Under Rood's analysis, then, Wichita has 9 phonemic vowels:

	Short	Long	Overlong
High	ɪ	ɪˑ	ɪː
Mid	ɛ	ɛˑ	ɛː
Low	a	aˑ	aː

=== Tone ===
There is also a contrastive high tone, indicated here by an acute accent.

=== Syllable and phonotactics ===
While vowel sequences are uncommon (unless the extra-long vowels are considered sequences), consonant clusters are ubiquitous in Wichita. Words may begin with clusters such as [kskh] (kskhaːɾʔa) and [ɾ̥h] (ɾ̥hintsʔa). The longest cluster noted in Wichita is five consonants, counting [t͡s] as a single consonant: /nahiʔint͡skskih/ 'while sleeping'; however, Wichita syllables are more commonly CV or CVC.

== Grammar and morphology ==
Wichita is an agglutinative, polysynthetic language, meaning words have a root verb basis to which information is added; that is, morphemes (affixes) are added to verb roots. These words may contain subjects, objects, indirect objects, and possibly indicate possession. Thus, surprisingly complex ideas can be communicated with as little as one word. For example, /kijaʔaːt͡ssthirʔaːt͡s/ means "one makes himself a fire".

Nouns do not distinguish between singular and plural, as this information is specified as part of the verb. Wichita also does not distinguish between genders, which can be problematic for English language translation.

Sentence structure is much more fluid than in English, with words being organized according to importance or novelty. Often the subject of the sentence is placed initially. Linguist David S. Rood, who has written many papers concerning the Wichita language, recorded this example, as spoken by Bertha Provost (a native speaker, now deceased) in the late 1960s.

hiɾaːwisʔihaːs kijariːt͡seːhiɾeːweʔe hikaʔat͡saːkikaʔakʔit͡saki hiɾaːɾʔ tiʔi naːkiɾih
Old.time.people God When.he.made.us.dwell Earth This Where.it.is.located
"When God put our ancestors on this earth."

The subject of the sentence is ancestors, and thus the sentence begins with it, instead of God, or creation (when.he.made.us.dwell). This leads one to conclude Wichita has a largely free word-order, where parts of the sentence do not need to be located next to each other to be related.

The perfective tense demonstrates that an act has been completed; on the other hand, the intentive tense indicates that a subject plans or planned to carry out a certain act. The habitual aspect indicates a habitual activity, for example: "he smokes" but not "he is smoking." Durative tense describes an activity, which is coextensive with something else.

Wichita has no indirect speech or passive voice. When using past tense, speakers must indicate if this knowledge of the past is based in hearsay or personal knowledge. Wichita has a clusivity distinction in the first person, i.e. separate ways of expressing "we" that explicitly includes or excludes the listener. Wichita also differentiates between singular, dual and plural number, instead of the simpler singular or plural designations commonly found.

=== Affixes ===
Some Wichita affixes are:

Prefixes
aorist	a ... ki-
aorist quotative	aːʔa ... ki-
future	keʔe-
future quotative	eheː-
perfect	aɾa-
perfect quotative	aːɾa-
indicative	ta/ti-
exclamatory	iskiri-
durative	a/i-
imperative	hi/i-
future imperative	kiʔi-
optative	kaʔa-
debetative	kaɾa-

Suffixes
perfective	Ø
imperfective	-s
intentive	-staɾis
habitual	-ːss
too late	-iːhiːʔ

/ehèːʔáɾasis/
future.quotative.COOK.imperfective
'I heard she'll be cooking it.'

=== Instrumental suffixes ===
The suffix is Rá꞉hir, added to the base. Another means of expressing instrument, used only for body parts, is a characteristic position of incorporation in the verb complex.

1. ha꞉rhiwi꞉cá꞉hir 'using a bowl' (ha꞉rhiwi꞉c 'bowl')
2. ika꞉rá꞉hir 'with a rock' (ika꞉ʔa 'rock')
3. kirikirʔi꞉sá꞉hir 'in Wichita (the language)' (kirikirʔi꞉s 'Wichita)
4. iskiʔo꞉rʔeh 'hold me in your arms' (iskiʔ 'imperative 2nd subject, 1st object'; a 'reflexive possessor'; ʔawir 'arm'; ʔahi 'hold').
5. keʔese꞉cʔíriyari 'you will shake your head' (keʔes 'future 2nd subject'; a 'reflexive possessor'; ic 'face'; ʔiriyari 'go around'. Literally: 'you will go around, using your face').

=== Tense and aspect ===
One of these tense-aspect prefixes must occur in any complete verb form.

durative; directive	a / i
aorist (general past tense)	a...ki
perfect; recent past	ara
future quotative	eheː
subjunctive	ha...ki
exclamatory; immediate present	iskiri
ought	kara
optative	kaʔa
future	keʔe
future imperative	kiʔi
participle	na
interrogative indicative	ra
indicative	ta
negative indicative	ʔa

Note: kara (ought), alone, always means 'subject should', but in complex constructions it is used for hypothetical action, as in 'what would you do if...')

The aspect-marking suffixes are:

perfective	Ø
imperfective	s
intentive	staris
generic	ːss

Other prefixes and suffixes are as follows:

- The exclamatory inflection indicates excitement.
- The imperative is used as the command form.
- The directive inflection is used in giving directions in sequences, such as describing how one makes something.
  - This occurs only with 2nd or 3rd person subject pronouns and only in the singular.
- The optative is usually translated 'I wish' or 'subject should'.
- Although ought seems to imply that the action is the duty of the subject, it is frequently used for hypothetical statements in complex constructions.
- The unit durative suggests that the beginning and ending of the event are unimportant, or that the event is coextensive with something else.
- Indicative is the name of the most commonly used Wichita inflection translating English sentences out of context. It marks predication as a simple assertion. The time is always non-future, the event described is factual, and the situation is usually one of everyday conversation.
  - The prefix is ti- with 3rd persons and ta- otherwise
- The aorist is used in narratives, stories, and in situations where something that happened or might have happened relatively far in the past is meant.
- The future may be interpreted in the traditional way. It is obligatory for any event in the future, no matter how imminent, unless the event is stated to be part of someone's plans, in which case intentive is used instead.
- The perfect implies recently completed.
  - It makes the fact of completion of activity definite, and specifies an event in the recent past.
- The aorist intentive means 'I heard they were going to ... but they didn't.'
- The indicative intentive means 'They are going to ... ' without implying anything about the evidence on which the statement is based, nor about the probability of completion.
- The optional inflection quotative occurs with the aorist, future, or perfect tenses.
  - If it occurs, it specifies that the speaker's information is from some source other than personal observation or knowledge.
    - 'I heard that ... ' or 'I didn't know, but ... '
  - If it does not occur, the form unambiguously implies that evidence for the report is personal observation.

Examples: ʔarasi 'cook'

á꞉kaʔarásis	quotative aorist imperfective	I heard she was cooking it
kiyakaʔarásis	quotative aorist imperfective	I heard she was cooking it
á꞉kaʔarásiki	quotative aorist perfective	I heard she was cooking it
á꞉kaʔarásistaris	quotative aorist intentive	I heard she was planning on cooking it
kiyakaʔarásistaris	quotative aorist intentive	I heard she was planning on cooking it
á꞉kaʔarásiki꞉ss	quotative aorist generic	I heard she always cooked it
kiyakaʔarásiki꞉ss	quotative aorist generic	I heard she always cooked it
ákaʔárasis	aorist imperfective	I know myself she was cooking it
ákaʔárasiki	aorist perfective	I know myself she cooked it
ákaʔarásistaris	aorist intentive	I know myself she was going to cook it
ákaʔaraásiki꞉ss	aorist generic	I know myself she always cooked it
keʔárasiki	future perfective	She will cook it
keʔárasis	future imperfective	She will be cooking it
keʔárasiki꞉ss	future generic	She will always cook it
ehéʔárasiki	quotative future perfective	I heard she will cook it
ehéʔárasis	quotative future imperfective	I heard she will be cooking it
eheʔárasiki꞉ss	quotative future generic	I heard she will always be the one to cook it
taʔarásis	indicative imperfective	She is cooking it; She cooked it
taʔarásistaris	indicative intentive	She's planning to cook it
taʔarásiki꞉꞉s	indicative generic	She always cooks it
ískirá꞉rásis	exclamatory	There she goes, cooking it!
aʔarásis	directive imperfective	Then you cook it
haʔarásiki	imperative imperfective	Let her cook it
ki꞉ʔárasiki	future imperative perfective	Let her cook it later
ki꞉ʔárasiki꞉ss	future imperative generic	You must always let her cook it
á꞉raʔarásiki	quotative perfect perfective	I heard she cooked it
á꞉raʔarásistaris	quotative perfect intentive	I heard she was going to cook it
áraʔárasiki	perfect perfective	I know she cooked it
keʔeʔárasis	optative imperfective	I wish she'd be cooking it
keʔeʔárasiki	optative perfective	I wish she'd cook it
keʔeʔárasistaris	optative intentive	I wish she would plan to cook it
keʔeʔárasiki꞉ss	optative generic	I wish she'd always cook it
keʔeʔárasiki꞉hi꞉ʔ	optative too late	I wish she had cooked it
karaʔárasis	ought imperfective	She ought to be cooking it
karaʔarásiki꞉ss	ought generic	She should always cook it
karaʔárasiski꞉hiʔ	ought too late	She ought to have cooked it

=== Modifiers ===
assé꞉hah	all
ta꞉wʔic	few
tiʔih	this
ha꞉rí꞉h	that
hi꞉hánthirih	tomorrow
tiʔikhánthirisʔih	yesterday
chih á꞉kiʔí꞉rakhárisʔí꞉h	suddenly
ti꞉ʔ	at once
wah	already
chah	still
chih	continues
tiʔrih	here
harah	there
hí꞉raka꞉h	way off
hita	edge
kata	on the side
(i)wac	outside
ha	in water
ka	in a topless enclosure
ka꞉	in a completely enclosed space
kataska	in an open area
ʔir	in a direction
kataskeʔer	through the yard
kataskeʔero꞉c	out the other way from the yard

=== Case ===
In the Wichita language, there are only case markings for obliques. Here are some examples:

==== Instrumental case ====
- The suffix Rá꞉hir, added to the base
- Another means of expressing instrument, used only for body parts, is a characteristic position of incorporation in the verb complex
  - ha꞉rhiwi꞉cá꞉hir 'using a bowl' (ha꞉rhiwi꞉c 'bowl')
  - ika꞉rá꞉hir 'with a rock' (ika꞉ʔa 'rock')

==== Locative case ====
Most nouns take a locative suffix kiyah:

ika꞉ʔa -kiyah
rock LOC
'where the rock is'

But a few take the verbal -hirih:

hir-ahrʔa -hirih
ground LOC
'on the ground'

Any verbal participle (i.e. any sentence) can be converted to a locative clause by the suffix -hirih

- tihe꞉ha 'it is a creek'
- nahe꞉hárih 'where the creek is'

=== Predicates and arguments ===
Wichita is a polysynthetic language. Almost all the information in any simple sentence is expressed by means of bound morphemes in the verb complex. The only exception to this are (1) noun stems, specifically those functioning as agents of transitive verbs but sometimes those in other functions as well, and (2) specific modifying particles. A typical sentence from a story is the following:

wa꞉cʔarʔa {} kiya+ a...ki+ a+ Riwa꞉c+ ʔaras+ Ra+ ri+ kita+ ʔa+ hi꞉riks+ s {} na+ ya꞉k+ r+ wi+ hrih
squirrel {} QUOT AOR PVB {big (quantity)} meat COL PORT top come REP IPFV {} PTCP wood COL {be upright} LOC
'The squirrel, by making many trips, carried the large quantity of meat up into the top of the tree, they say.'

Note that squirrel is the agent and occurs by itself with no morphemes indicating number or anything else. The verb, in addition to the verbal units of quotative, aorist, repetitive, and imperfective, also contain morphemes that indicate the agent is singular, the patient is collective, the direction of the action is to the top, and all the lexical information about the whole patient noun phrase, "big quantity of meat."

== Gender ==
In the Wichita language, there is no gender distinction (WALS).

== Person and possession ==
	Subjective	Objective
1st person	-t-	-ki-
2nd person	-s-	-a꞉-
3rd person	-i-	Ø
inclusive	-ciy-	-ca꞉ki-

The verb 'have, possess' in Wichita is /uR ... ʔi/, a combination of the preverb 'possessive' and the root 'be'. Possession of a noun can be expressed by incorporating that noun in this verb and indicating the person of the possessor by the subject pronoun:

na- t- uR- ʔak- ʔi- h
PTCP 1.SBJ POSS wife be SUBORD
'my wife'

niye꞉s na- t- uR- ʔiki- h
child PTCP 1.SBJ- POSS be.PL SUBORD
'my children'

== Number marking ==
Nouns can be divided into those that are countable and those that are not. In general, this correlates with the possibility for plural marking: Countable nouns can be marked for dual or plural; if not so marked, they are assumed to be singular. Uncountable nouns cannot be pluralized.

Those uncountable nouns that are also liquids are marked as such by a special morpheme, kir.

ta i a꞉ ti꞉sa꞉s kir ri ʔa s
IND 3.SBJ PVB medicine liquid PORT come IPFV
'He is bringing (liquid) medicine'

Those incountable nouns that are not liquid are not otherwise marked in Wichita. This feature is labeled dry mass. Forms such as ye꞉c 'fire', kirʔi꞉c 'bread', and ka꞉hi꞉c 'salt' are included in this category.

ta i a꞉ ya꞉c ri ʔa s
IND 3.SBJ PVB fire PORT come IPFV
'He is bringing fire.'

ta i a꞉ ka꞉hi꞉c ri ʔa s
IND 3.SBJ PVB salt PORT come IPFV
'He is bringing salt.'

Wichita countable nouns are divided into those that are collective and those that are not. The collective category includes most materials, such as wood; anything that normally comes in pieces, such as meat, corn, or flour; and any containers such as pots, bowls, or sacks when they are filled with pieces of something.

ta i a꞉ aʔas ra ri ʔa s
IND 3.SBJ PVB meat COL PORT come IPFV
'He is bringing meat.'

ta i a꞉ aʔas ri ʔa s
IND 3.SBJ PVB meat PORT come IPFV
'He is bringing (one piece of) meat.'

Some of the noncollective nominals are also marked for other selectional restrictions. In particular, with some verbs, animate nouns (including first and second person pronouns) require special treatment when they are patients in the sentence. Whenever there is an animate patient or object of certain verbs such as u...raʔa 'bring' or irasi 'find', the morpheme |hiʔri|(/hirʔ/, /hiʔr/, /hirʔi/) also occurs with the verb. The use of this morpheme is not predictable by rule and must be specified for each verb in the language that requires it.

ta i irasi s
IND 3.SBJ find IPFV
'He found it (inanimate).'

ta i hirʔi irasi s
IND 3.SBJ {patient is animate} find IPFV
'He found it (animate).'

Like hiʔri 'patient is animate', the morpheme wakhahr, means 'patient is an activity'.

Countable nouns that are neither animate nor activities, such as chairs, apples, rocks, or body parts, do not require any semantic class agreement morphemes in the surface grammar of Wichita.

The morpheme |ra꞉k| marks any or all non-third persons in the sentence as plural.

The morpheme for 'collective' or 'patient is not singular'. The shape of this varies from verb to verb, but the collective is usually |ru|, |ra|, or |r|.

The noncollective plural is usually |ʔak|. Instead of a morpheme here, some roots change form to mark plural. Examples include:

Word	Singular	Plural
cook	ʔarasi	wa꞉rasʔi꞉rʔ
eat	kaʔac	ʔa
kill	ki	ʔessa

A surface structure object in the non-third-person category can be clearly marked as singular, dual, or plural. The morpheme ra꞉k marks plurality; a combination oh hi and ʔak marks dual. Singular is marked by zero.

If both agent and patient are third person, a few intransitive verbs permit the same distinctions for patients as are possible for non-third objects: singular, dual, and plural. These verbs (such as 'come' and 'sit') allow the morpheme wa to mark 'dual patient'. In all other cases the morphemes ru, ra, r, or ʔak means 'patient is plural'.

- |hi| subject is nonsingular
- |ʔak| third person patient is nonsingular
- |ra꞉k| non-third-person is plural. If both the subject and object are non-third person, reference is to the object only.
- |hi ... ʔak| non-third-person is dual
- |ra꞉kʔak| combine meanings of ra꞉k and ʔak
- zero singular

== Endangerment ==
According to the Ethnologue Languages of the World website, the Wichita language is "dormant", meaning that no one has more than symbolic proficiency. The last native speaker of the Wichita language, Doris Jean Lamar McLemore, died in 2016. The reason for the language's decline is because the speakers of the Wichita language switched to speaking English. Thus, children were not being taught Wichita and only the elders knew the language. "Extensive efforts to document and preserve the language" are in effect through the Wichita Documentation Project.

== Revitalization efforts ==
The Wichita and Affiliated Tribes offered language classes, taught by Doris McLemore and Shirley Davilla. The tribe created an immersion class for children and a class for adults. Linguist David Rood has collaborated with Wichita speakers to create a dictionary and language CDs. The tribe is collaborating with Rood of the University of Colorado, Boulder to document and teach the language through the Wichita Documentation Project.
