= Riverside Indian School =

Indian boarding school in Oklahoma

Coordinates: 35.0956°N 98.2469°W

- Anadarko, Caddo County, Oklahoma; United States

Information
- Former name: Wichita-Caddo School
- Established: 1871; 155 years ago
- School board: Bureau of Indian Education
- Grades: 4-12

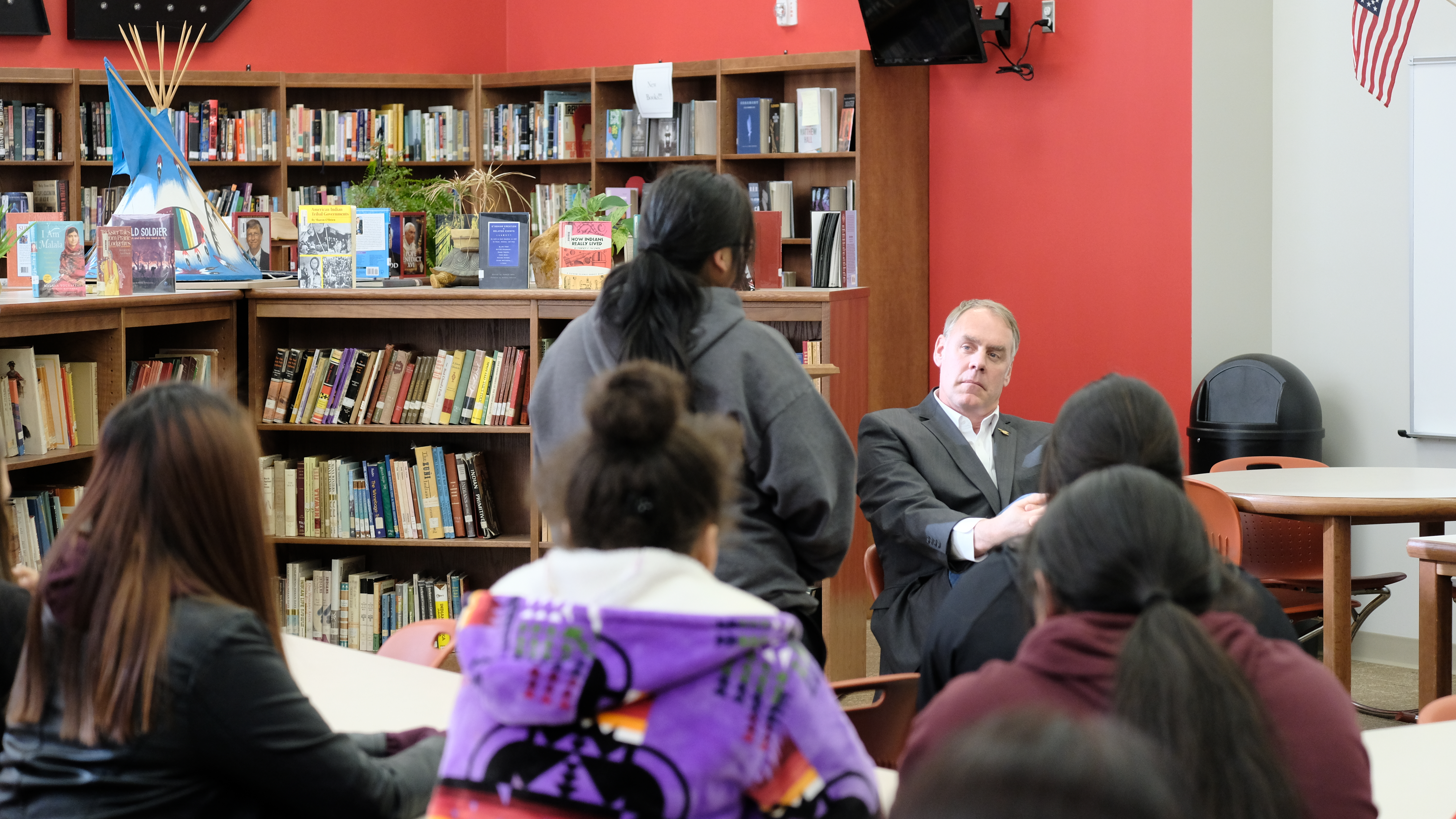
Secretary of the Interior Ryan Zinke in the school library during a visit in 2018.

Riverside Indian School (RIS) is a Bureau of Indian Education-operated boarding school in unincorporated Caddo County, Oklahoma, with an Anadarko address, for grades 4–12. It is operated by the Bureau of Indian Education (BIE).

It first opened in 1871 in Anadarko, Oklahoma. Riverside Indian School, originally known as the Wichita-Caddo School, is one of the oldest Indigenous boarding schools in the United States. There are four off-reservation Indian boarding schools directly operated by the BIE still operating today; these are Riverside Indian School, Sherman Indian High School, Chemawa Indian School, and Flandreau Indian School. Today, Riverside Indian School is home to hundreds of students that range from fourth to twelfth grade.

== History ==
Riverside Indian School is a Native American boarding school near Anadarko, Oklahoma. Riverside first opened its doors to Native American students in 1875 and is still open to Native American students today. Riverside Indian School is an intertribal school, meaning multiple tribes attend the school. This is mostly because Oklahoma is the residence of multiple tribes that were pushed to reservation land in the state.

Students attending Riverside Indian school from 1890 to 1920 faced nondiscriminatory clashing of cultures and language barriers between students of different tribes. In other words, students were discriminated against in the sense that they weren't allowed to attend schools with white students. However, there was no segregation between tribes.

Riverside Indian School allowed students to remain together whether or not they were from the same tribe. Students were segregated and kept away from non-Indian students. This created a sense of familiarity between students. Past students reported feeling a sense of belonging at Riverside and many students wanted to attend school in order to be around other students like themselves. Students at Riverside were able to maintain their tribal identity through frequent familial visits.

== Today ==
The Riverside Indian School has nearly 800 students. These students are from over 75 different Native American tribes all across the United States. Students come for nine months of the year and stay in dormitories on the school grounds. Riverside strives to make the living arrangements for each student conducive to their academics and social needs. The school is over 135 acres, located on Wichita, Caddo, and Delaware land, all north of Anadarko. Riverside pays for its out-of-state students to travel back home during breaks. The current superintendent is Amber Wilson, with Kallan Glasgow as the assistant principal.

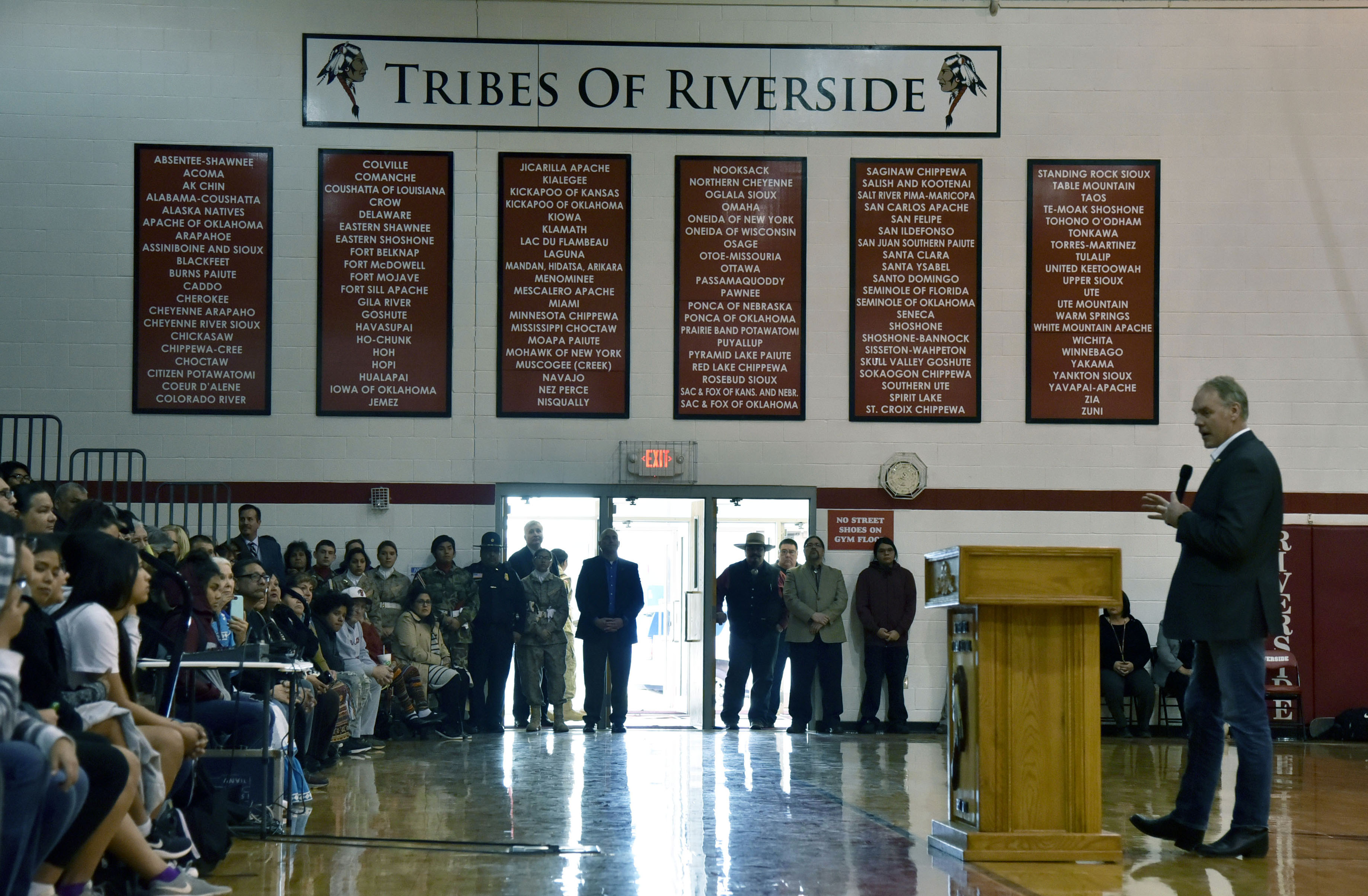
Secretary of the Interior Zinke addressing the school in the gymnasium in 2018

== Campus ==
The school has a pair of dormitories for boys and girls in grades 8–12 that opened in 2014. Also the Arapaho Dormitory had boys in grades 4–7 and the Comanche Dormitory has girls in grades 4–7. The Wichita Dormitory is for transition students of all grades.

== Notable alumni ==
- Jeri Ah-be-hill
- Gomeo Bobelu
- John Emhoolah Jr.
- Doris McLemore
- Jennie R. Joe
