= Timeline of New Mexico history =

Coordinates: 34.4071°N 106.1126°W

This timeline is a chronology of significant events in the history of the US State of New Mexico and the historical area that is now occupied by the state.

2000s 1900s Statehood 1800s Territory 1700s 1600s 1500s Before 1492

== 2020s ==
| Year | Date | Event |
|---|---|---|
| 2026 | November 11 | In the 2026 Midterm Election, New Mexico voters chose to retain all three of the state's Congressional Representatives. Voters also elected Deb Haaland to be the state's next Governor, making her the first Native American woman governor of a U.S. state in the history of the country. Democrats maintained a trifecta in the New Mexico Legislature. |
| 2022 | November 8 | In the 2022 General Election, New Mexico voters elect Gabe Vasquez and re-elect Melanie Stansbury and Teresa Leger Fernandez to the United States House of Representatives. Voters re-elect Governor Michelle Lujan Grisham. Democrats retain control of the New Mexico Legislature. |
| 2021 | June 1 | Melanie Stansbury wins the special congressional replacement election to replace Deb Haaland as the U.S. representative for New Mexico's 1st Congressional District. |
| 2021 | May 16 | Deb Haaland assumes office as the United States Secretary of the Interior, the first Native American to serve as a U.S. Cabinet Secretary. |
| 2020 | November 3 | In the 2020 general election, New Mexico voters elect five U.S. presidential electors for Joe Biden, elect Ben Ray Luján as new U.S. senator, re-elect Deb Haaland and elect Yvette Herrell and Teresa Leger Fernandez as U.S. representatives. Democrats retain control of the New Mexico Legislature. |
| 2020 | April 2 | The 2020 United States census enumerates the population of the State of New Mexico, later tabulated as 2,117,522, a 2.83% increase since the 2010 United States census. New Mexico remains the 36st most populous of the 50 U.S. states. |
| 2020 | March 11 | Michelle Lujan Grisham signs an executive order declaring a state of public health emergency in New Mexico due to the COVID-19 pandemic. |

== 2010s ==
| Year | Date | Event |
|---|---|---|
| 2019 | December 20 | U.S. President Donald Trump signs the National Defense Authorization Act for Fiscal Year 2020 which creates White Sands National Park from White Sands National Monument. |
| 2019 | January 1 | Michelle Lujan Grisham assumes office as the thirty-second Governor of the State of New Mexico. |
| 2015 | November 10 | The National Park Service creates the Manhattan Project National Historical Park. |
| 2015 | October 22 | Dianna Duran resigns as New Mexico Secretary of State amid investigations of corruption. |
| 2014 | May 21 | U.S. President Barack Obama issues an executive order creating Organ Mountains–Desert Peaks National Monument. |
| 2013 | May 16 | The City of Rio Communities is incorporated. |
| 2013 | March 25 | U.S. President Barack Obama issues an executive order creating Rio Grande del Norte National Monument. |
| 2013 | January 3 | Martin Heinrich takes office as the junior New Mexico U.S. Senator. |
| 2011 | January 1 | Susana Martinez assumes office as the thirty-first Governor of the State of New Mexico. |
| 2010 | April 1 | The 2010 United States census enumerates the population of the State of New Mexico, later determined to be 2,059,179, an increase of 13.2% since the 2000 United States census. New Mexico remains the 36th most populous of the 50 U.S. states. |

== 2000s ==
| Year | Date | Event |
|---|---|---|
| 2009 | January 3 | Tom Udall takes office as the junior New Mexico U.S. Senator. |
| 2003 | January 1 | Bill Richardson assumes office as the thirtieth Governor of the State of New Mexico. |
| 2002 | December 4 | U.S. President George W. Bush signs An Act to amend the National Trails System Act to designate the Old Spanish Trail as a National Historic Trail creating the Old Spanish National Historic Trail. |
| 2001 | January 17 | U.S. President Bill Clinton issues an executive order creating Kasha-Katuwe Tent Rocks National Monument. |
| 2000 | October 13 | U.S. President Bill Clinton signs An Act to amend the National Trails System Act to designate El Camino Real de Tierra Adentro as a National Historic Trail, creating El Camino Real de Tierra Adentro National Historic Trail. |
| 2000 | July 25 | U.S. President Bill Clinton signs An Act to authorize the acquisition of the Valles Caldera, to provide for an effective land and wildlife management program for this resource within the Department of Agriculture, and for other purposes, creating the Valles Caldera National Preserve. |
| 2000 | April 1 | The 2000 United States census enumerates the population of the State of New Mexico, later determined to be 1,819,046, an increase of 20.1% since the 1990 United States census. New Mexico becomes the 36th most populous of the 50 U.S. states. |

== 1990s ==
| Year | Date | Event |
|---|---|---|
| 1998 | August 18 | U.S. President Bill Clinton appoints Bill Richardson the ninth United States Secretary of Energy. |
| 1997 | February 18 | U.S. President Bill Clinton appoints Bill Richardson the twenty-first United States Ambassador to the United Nations. |
| 1995 | January 1 | Gary Johnson assumes office as the twenty-ninth Governor of the State of New Mexico. |
| 1992 | December 14 | The United Nations Educational, Scientific and Cultural Organization (UNESCO) designates Taos Pueblo as a World Heritage Site. |
| 1991 | July 2 | The National Park Service changes the name of Pecos National Monument to Pecos National Historical Park. |
| 1991 | January 1 | Bruce King assumes office as the twenty-eighth Governor of the State of New Mexico. |
| 1990 | June 27 | U.S. President George H. W. Bush issues a proclamation creating Petroglyph National Monument. |
| 1990 | April 1 | The 1990 United States census enumerates the population of the State of New Mexico, later determined to be 1,515,069, an increase of 16.2% since the 1980 United States census. New Mexico remains the 37th most populous of the 50 U.S. states. |

== 1980s ==
| Year | Date | Event |
|---|---|---|
| 1988 | October 28 | The National Park Service changes the name of Salinas National Monument to Salinas Pueblo Missions National Monument. |
| 1987 | December 31 | U.S. President Ronald Reagan signs An Act to establish the El Malpais National Monument and the El Malpais National Conservation Area in the State of New Mexico, to authorize the Masau Trail, and for other purposes, creating El Malpais National Monument and changing the name of Capulin Mountain National Monument to Capulin Volcano National Monument. |
| 1987 | December 11 | The United Nations Educational, Scientific and Cultural Organization (UNESCO) designates the Chaco Culture World Heritage Site. The Chaco Culture World Heritage Site includes Chaco Culture National Historical Park, Aztec Ruins National Monument, and several smaller Chaco sites managed by the Bureau of Land Management. |
| 1987 | May 8 | U.S. President Ronald Reagan signs An Act to amend the National Trails System Act to designate the Santa Fe Trail as a National Historic Trail, creating the Santa Fe National Historic Trail. |
| 1987 | January 1 | Garrey Carruthers assumes office as the twenty-seventh Governor of the State of New Mexico. |
| 1983 | January 1 | Toney Anaya assumes office as the twenty-sixth Governor of the State of New Mexico. |
| 1981 | June 19 | Cibola County, the thirty-third and newest county, is created from the western part of Valencia County. |
| 1980 | December 19 | U.S. President Jimmy Carter signs An Act to designate certain National Forest System lands in the State of New Mexico for inclusion in the National Wilderness Preservation System, and for other purposes, that changes the name of Chaco Canyon National Monument to Chaco Culture National Historical Park, and changes the name of Gran Quivira National Monument to Salinas National Monument. |
| 1980 | April 1 | The 1980 United States census enumerates the population of the State of New Mexico, later determined to be 1,302,894, an increase of 28.1% since the 1970 United States census. New Mexico remains the 37th most populous of the 50 U.S. states but gains a 3rd Congressional District. |

== 1970s ==
| Year | Date | Event |
|---|---|---|
| 1979 | January 1 | Bruce King assumes office as the twenty-fifth Governor of the State of New Mexico. |
| 1978 | November 10 | U.S. President Jimmy Carter signs the National Parks and Recreation Act of 1978 creating the Continental Divide National Scenic Trail. |
| 1976 | July 4 | The State of New Mexico celebrates the Bicentennial of the United States of America. |
| 1975 | January 1 | Jerry Apodaca assumes office as the twenty-fourth Governor of the State of New Mexico. |
| 1971 | January 1 | Bruce King assumes office as the twenty-third Governor of the State of New Mexico. |
| 1970 | April 1 | The 1970 United States census enumerates the population of the State of New Mexico, later determined to be 1,017,055, an increase of 6.9% since the 1960 United States census. New Mexico remains the 37th most populous of the 50 U.S. states. |

== 1960s ==
| Year | Date | Event |
|---|---|---|
| 1969 | March 4 | New Mexico creates its 2nd Congressional District to replace its At-large Congressional seat. This congressional district remains to the present. |
| 1968 | December 2 | U.S. President Lyndon B. Johnson signs An Act to establish a national trails system, and for other purposes, creating the National Trails System. |
| 1968 | July 1 | U.S. President Lyndon B. Johnson signs An Act to establish a national trails system, and for other purposes, creating the National Trails System. |
| 1967 | June 5 | Reies Tijerina leads an armed raid on the Rio Arriba County Courthouse in Tierra Amarilla. |
| 1967 | January 1 | David Cargo assumes office as the twenty-second Governor of the State of New Mexico. |
| 1965 | June 28 | U.S. President Lyndon B. Johnson issues a proclamation creating Pecos National Monument. |
| 1963 | January 1 | Jack M. Campbell assumes office as the twenty-first Governor of the State of New Mexico. |
| 1962 | November 30 | Lieutenant Governor Tom Bolack assumes office as the twentieth Governor of the State of New Mexico upon the resignation of Governor Edwin L. Mechem. |
| 1962 | November 18 | Dennis Chavez, United States Senator since 1934, dies during his fifth term in the Senate. |
| 1961 | January 1 | Edwin L. Mechem assumes office as the nineteenth Governor of the State of New Mexico. |
| 1960 | November 8 | The State of New Mexico amends its Constitution changing the name of New Mexico College of Agriculture and Mechanic Arts to New Mexico State University. |
| 1960 | April 1 | The 1960 United States census enumerates the population of the State of New Mexico, later determined to be 951,023, an increase of 39.6% since the 1950 United States census. New Mexico becomes the 37th most populous of the 50 U.S. states. |

== 1950s ==
| Year | Date | Event |
|---|---|---|
| 1959 | January 1 | John Burroughs assumes office as the eighteenth Governor of the State of New Mexico. |
| 1957 | January 1 | Edwin L. Mechem assumes office as the seventeenth Governor of the State of New Mexico. |
| 1955 | January 1 | John F. Simms assumes office as the sixteenth Governor of the State of New Mexico. |
| 1954 | June 28 | U.S. President Dwight D. Eisenhower issues a proclamation creating Fort Union National Monument. |
| 1951 | January 1 | Edwin L. Mechem assumes office as the fifteenth Governor of the State of New Mexico. |
| 1950 | August 28 | U.S. President Harry S. Truman issues a Public Land Order abolishing Mesilla National Forest. |
| 1950 | April 1 | The 1950 United States census enumerates the population of the State of New Mexico, later determined to be 681,187, an increase of 28.1% since the 1940 United States census. New Mexico becomes the 39th most populous of the 48 U.S. states. |

== 1940s ==
| Year | Date | Event |
|---|---|---|
| 1947 | January 1 | Thomas J. Mabry assumes office as the fourteenth Governor of the State of New Mexico. |
| 1945 | September 2 | World War II ends as the Empire of Japan formally surrenders. |
| 1945 | July 18 | The U.S. Army's Manhattan Project conducts the Trinity test, the first detonation of a nuclear weapon. The test is conducted in Socorro County on the Alamogordo Bombing Range. |
| 1945 | May 8 | The war in Europe ends as the Greater German Empire formally surrenders. |
| 1944 | April 6 | U.S. President Franklin D. Roosevelt issues a Public Land Order creating Mesilla National Forest. (Abolished August 28, 1950.) |
| 1943 | January 1 | John J. Dempsey assumes office as the thirteenth Governor of the State of New Mexico. |
| 1941 | December 11 | The United States declares war on the German Reich and the Italian Empire. |
| 1941 | December 8 | The United States declares war on the Empire of Japan and enters World War II. |
| 1940 | April 1 | The 1940 United States census enumerates the population of the State of New Mexico, later determined to be 531,818, an increase of 25.6% since the 1930 United States census. New Mexico becomes the 41st most populous of the 48 U.S. states and gains a 2nd Congressional seat. |

== 1930s ==
| Year | Date | Event |
|---|---|---|
| 1939 | January 1 | John E. Miles assumes office as the twelfth Governor of the State of New Mexico. |
| 1937 | November 3 | The United States Department of Agriculture creates Kiowa National Grassland. |
| 1937 | July 22 | U.S. President Franklin D. Roosevelt signs An Act to create the Farmers' Home Corporation, to promote more secure occupancy of farms and farm homes, to correct the economic instability resulting from some present forms of farm tenancy, and for other purposes, also known as the Bankhead-Jones Farm Tenant Act. |
| 1937 | spring | Bluewater State Park, New Mexico's first state park, opens. |
| 1935 | January 1 | Clyde Tingley assumes office as the eleventh Governor of the State of New Mexico. |
| 1933 | September 25 | Lieutenant Governor Andrew W. Hockenhull assumes office as the tenth Governor of the State of New Mexico upon the death of Governor Arthur Seligman. |
| 1933 | January 18 | U.S. President Herbert Hoover issues a proclamation creating White Sands National Monument. |
| 1932 | August | Edgar Billings Howard begins excavating the Blackwater Locality No. 1 archaeological site discovered in 1929 by Ridgely Whiteman near Clovis. Blackwater Locality No. 1 becomes the type site for Clovis culture. |
| 1931 | December 3 | U.S. President Herbert Hoover issues an executive order creating Cibola National Forest. |
| 1931 | January 1 | Arthur Seligman assumes office as the ninth Governor of the State of New Mexico. |
| 1930 | May 14 | U.S. President Herbert Hoover signs An Act to establish the Carlsbad Caverns National Park in the State of New Mexico, and for other purposes, creating Carlsbad Caverns National Park from Carlsbad Caverns National Monument. |
| 1930 | April 1 | The 1930 United States census enumerates the population of the State of New Mexico, later determined to be 423,317, an increase of 17.5% since the 1920 United States census. New Mexico becomes the 43rd most populous of the 48 U.S. states. |

== 1920s ==
| Year | Date | Event |
|---|---|---|
| 1929 | | Nineteen-year-old Ridgley Whiteman discovers Paleo-Indian artifacts at Blackwater Draw near Clovis. |
| 1928 | July 2 | U.S. President Calvin Coolidge issues an executive order enlarging Aztec Ruin National Monument and changing the name to Aztec Ruins National Monument. |
| 1927 | January 1 | Richard C. Dillon assumes office as the eighth Governor of the State of New Mexico. |
| 1925 | January 1 | Arthur T. Hannett assumes office as the seventh Governor of the State of New Mexico. |
| 1924 | June 2 | U.S. President Calvin Coolidge signs An Act To authorize the Secretary of the Interior to issue certificates of citizenship to Indians, also known as the Indian Citizenship Act of 1924, finally granting full United States Citizenship to all Native Americans born in the United States. |
| 1923 | October 25 | U.S. President Calvin Coolidge issues a proclamation creating Carlsbad Caverns National Monument. |
| 1923 | January 24 | U.S. President Warren G. Harding issues a proclamation creating Aztec Ruin National Monument. |
| 1923 | January 1 | James F. Hinkle assumes office as the sixth Governor of the State of New Mexico. |
| 1921 | March 4 | Harding County is created on the same day its namesake, Warren G. Harding, is inaugurated as President of the United States. |
| 1921 | January 1 | Merritt C. Mechem assumes office as the fifth Governor of the State of New Mexico. |
| 1920 | April 1 | The 1920 United States census enumerates the population of the State of New Mexico, later determined to be 360,350, an increase of 10.1% since the 1910 United States census. New Mexico becomes the 43rd most populous of the 48 U.S. states |

== 1910s ==
| Year | Date | Event |
|---|---|---|
| 1919 | January 1 | Octaviano Ambrosio Larrazolo assumes office as the fourth Governor of the State of New Mexico. |
| 1918 | November 11 | An armistice halts the Great War. |
| 1917 | April 6 | The United States declares war on the German Empire and enters the Great War. |
| 1917 | February 18 | Lieutenant Governor Washington Lindsey assumes office as the third Governor of the State of New Mexico upon the death of Governor Ezequiel Cabeza De Baca. |
| 1917 | January 1 | Ezequiel Cabeza De Baca assumes office as the second Governor of the State of New Mexico. |
| 1916 | August 25 | U.S. President Woodrow Wilson signs An Act To establish a National Park Service, and for other purposes. |
| 1916 | August 9 | U.S. President Woodrow Wilson issues a proclamation creating Capulin Mountain National Monument. |
| 1916 | February 11 | U.S. President Woodrow Wilson issues a proclamation creating Bandelier National Monument. |
| 1915 | April 6 | U.S. President Woodrow Wilson issues an executive order creating Santa Fe National Forest. |
| 1912 | January 14 | William C. McDonald assumes office as the first Governor of the State of New Mexico. |
| 1912 | January 6 | U.S. President William Howard Taft issues Proclamation 1175: Admitting New Mexico to the Union. The Territory of New Mexico becomes the State of New Mexico, the 47th U.S. state. |
| 1910 | June 20 | U.S. President William Howard Taft signs An Act to enable the people of New Mexico to form a constitution and state government and be admitted into the Union on an equal footing with the original States; and to enable the people of Arizona to form a constitution and state government and be admitted into the Union on an equal footing with the original States. |
| 1910 | April 1 | The 1910 United States census enumerates the population of the Territory of New Mexico, later determined to be 327,301, an increase of 67.6% since the 1900 United States census. New Mexico becomes the most populous of the four U.S. territories. |
| 1910 | March 1 | U.S. President William Howard Taft appoints William J. Mills the eighteenth (and last) Governor of the Territory of New Mexico. |

== 1900s ==
| Year | Date | Event |
|---|---|---|
| 1909 | November 1 | U.S. President William Howard Taft issues a proclamation creating Gran Quivira National Monument. |
| 1909 | March 2 | U.S. President Theodore Roosevelt issues an executive order creating Zuni National Forest. |
| 1908 | July 2 | U.S. President Theodore Roosevelt issues executive orders creating Alamo National Forest and Pecos National Forest. |
| 1908 | June 26 | U.S. President Theodore Roosevelt issues an executive order creating Carson National Forest. |
| 1908 | June 18 | U.S. President Theodore Roosevelt issues a proclamation creating Datil National Forest. |
| 1907 | November 16 | U.S. President Theodore Roosevelt issues a proclamation creating Gila Cliff Dwellings National Monument. |
| 1907 | April 24 | U.S. President Theodore Roosevelt issues a proclamation creating Sacramento National Forest. |
| 1907 | April 20 | U.S. President Theodore Roosevelt appoints George Curry the seventeenth Governor of the Territory of New Mexico. |
| 1907 | April 19 | U.S. President Theodore Roosevelt issues a proclamation creating Guadalupe National Forest. |
| 1907 | March 16 | U.S. President Theodore Roosevelt issues a proclamation abolishing the Portales Forest Reserve. |
| 1907 | March 11 | U.S. President Theodore Roosevelt issues a proclamation creating Chaco Canyon National Monument. |
| 1907 | March 1 | U.S. President Theodore Roosevelt issues a proclamation creating the Las Animas Forest Reserve. |
| 1907 | February 6 | U.S. President Theodore Roosevelt issues a proclamation creating the Big Burros Forest Reserve. |
| 1906 | December 8 | U.S. President Theodore Roosevelt issues a proclamation creating El Morro National Monument. |
| 1906 | November 7 | U.S. President Theodore Roosevelt issues a proclamation creating the Taos Forest Reserve. |
| 1906 | November 6 | U.S. President Theodore Roosevelt issues a proclamation creating the Manzano Forest Reserve. |
| 1906 | November 5 | U.S. President Theodore Roosevelt issues proclamations creating the Gallinas Forest Reserve, the Magdalena Forest Reserve, the Peloncillo Forest Reserve, and the San Mateo Forest Reserve. |
| 1906 | October 5 | U.S. President Theodore Roosevelt issues a proclamation creating the Mount Taylor Forest Reserve. |
| 1906 | June 16 | U.S. President Theodore Roosevelt signs An Act to enable the people of Oklahoma and of the Indian Territory to form a constitution and State government and be admitted into the Union on an equal footing with the original States; and to enable the people of New Mexico and of Arizona to form a constitution and State government and be admitted into the Union on an equal footing with the original States. |
| 1906 | June 8 | U.S. President Theodore Roosevelt signs An Act For the preservation of American antiquities, also known as the Antiquities Act of 1906, giving the President of the United States the authority to create national monuments on federal lands to protect significant natural, cultural, or scientific features. |
| 1906 | January 10 | U.S. President Theodore Roosevelt appoints Herbert James Hagerman the sixteenth Governor of the Territory of New Mexico. |
| 1905 | October 12 | U.S. President Theodore Roosevelt issues a proclamation creating the Jemez Forest Reserve. |
| 1905 | October 3 | U.S. President Theodore Roosevelt issues a proclamation creating the Portales Forest Reserve. (Abolished March 16, 1907.) |
| 1905 | July 21 | U.S. President Theodore Roosevelt issues a proclamation creating the Gila Forest Reserve. |
| 1902 | July 26 | U.S. President Theodore Roosevelt issues a proclamation creating the Lincoln Forest Reserve. |
| 1900 | April 1 | The 1900 United States census enumerates the population of the Territory of New Mexico, later determined to be 195,310, an increase of 21.9% since the 1890 United States census. New Mexico becomes the second most populous of the five U.S. territories. |

== 1890s ==
| Year | Date | Event |
|---|---|---|
| 1899 | March 2 | U.S. President William McKinley issues a proclamation creating the Gila River Forest Reserve. |
| 1898 | December 10 | The United States of America and the Kingdom of Spain sign the Treaty of Paris of 1898 to end the Spanish–American War. |
| 1898 | August 12 | The United States of America and the Kingdom of Spain sign a Protocol of Peace. |
| 1898 | April 23 | The Kingdom of Spain declares war on the United States of America. The United States declares war on Spain two days later. |
| 1897 | June 2 | U.S. President William McKinley appoints Miguel Antonio Otero the fifteenth Governor of the Territory of New Mexico. |
| 1893 | April | U.S. President Grover Cleveland appoints William Taylor Thornton the fourteenth Governor of the Territory of New Mexico. |
| 1892 | January 11 | U.S. President Benjamin Harrison issues a proclamation creating the Pecos River Forest Reserve, the third United States National Forest. |
| 1891 | March 3 | U.S. President Benjamin Harrison signs An act to repeal timber-culture laws, and for other purposes, also known as the Forest Reserve Act of 1891, giving the President of the United States the authority to create protected national forests on federal lands. |
| 1891 | winter | The New Mexico Territorial Agriculture College changes it name to the New Mexico College of Agriculture and Mechanic Arts |
| 1890 | April 1 | The 1890 United States census enumerates the population of the Territory of New Mexico, later determined to be 160,282, an increase of 34.1% since the 1880 United States census. New Mexico becomes the third most populous of the six U.S. territories. |
| 1890 | January 21 | The New Mexico Territorial Agriculture College opens at the former Las Cruces College. |

== 1880s ==
| Year | Date | Event |
|---|---|---|
| 1889 | spring | U.S. President Benjamin Harrison appoints L. Bradford Prince the thirteenth Governor of the Territory of New Mexico. |
| 1889 | February 28 | The Territory of New Mexico founds the University of New Mexico. |
| 1889 | February 25 | The Territory of New Mexico creates Chaves County from a portion of Lincoln County. |
| 1888 | September 17 | Hiram Hadly establishes Las Cruces College. |
| 1887 | February 25 | The Territory of New Mexico creates Eddy County from a portion of Lincoln County. |
| 1887 | February 24 | The Territory of New Mexico creates San Juan County from a portion of Rio Arriba County. |
| 1885 | spring | U.S. President Grover Cleveland appoints Edmund G. Ross the twelfth Governor of the Territory of New Mexico. |
| 1884 | April 3 | The Territory of New Mexico creates Sierra County from portions of Doña Ana County and Socorro County. |
| 1881 | July 14 | Sheriff Pat Garrett shoots to death Billy the Kid near Fort Sumner. |
| 1881 | March 9 | U.S. President James A. Garfield appoints Lionel Allen Sheldon the eleventh Governor of the Territory of New Mexico. |
| 1880 | November 12 | Territorial Governor Lew Wallace publishes Ben-Hur: A Tale of the Christ, the best-selling American novel of the 19th century. |
| 1880 | April 1 | The 1880 United States census enumerates the population of the Territory of New Mexico, later determined to be 119,565, an increase of 30.1% since the 1880 United States census. New Mexico becomes the third most populous of the eight U.S. territories. |

== 1870s ==
| Year | Date | Event |
|---|---|---|
| 1878 | November 1 | The tracks of the Atchison, Topeka, and Santa Fe Railroad are built into New Mexico in the Raton Pass, the first railroad to reach the state. |
| 1878 | September 29 | U.S. President Rutherford B. Hayes appoints Lew Wallace the tenth Governor of the Territory of New Mexico. |
| 1876 | July 4 | The Territory of New Mexico celebrates the Centennial of the United States of America while still reeling from the defeat of Lieutenant Colonel George Armstrong Custer and the 7th Cavalry Regiment at the Battle of the Little Bighorn on June 26. |
| 1875 | July 30 | U.S. President Ulysses S. Grant appoints Samuel Beach Axtell the ninth Governor of the Territory of New Mexico. |
| 1871 | July 27 | U.S. President Ulysses S. Grant appoints Marsh Giddings the eighth Governor of the Territory of New Mexico. |
| 1870 | April 1 | The 1870 United States census enumerates the population of the Territory of New Mexico, later determined to be 91,874, a decrease of −1.8% since the 1880 United States census when the Territory of Arizona was still a part of the Territory of New Mexico. New Mexico becomes the most populous of the nine U.S. territories. |

== 1860s ==
| Year | Date | Event |
|---|---|---|
| 1869 | May 28 | U.S. President Ulysses S. Grant appoints William Anderson Pile the seventh Governor of the Territory of New Mexico. |
| 1869 | January 25 | The Territory of New Mexico creates Colfax County from a portion of Mora County. |
| 1869 | January 16 | The Territory of New Mexico creates Lincoln County from a portion of Socorro County. |
| 1868 | January 30 | The Territory of New Mexico creates Grant County from a portion of Doña Ana County. |
| 1866 | January 15 | U.S. President Andrew Johnson appoints Robert Byington Mitchell the sixth Governor of the Territory of New Mexico. |
| 1865 | May 9 | U.S. President Andrew Johnson proclaims the end of the American Civil War. |
| 1863 | February 24 | U.S. President Abraham Lincoln signs An Act to provide a temporary Government for the Territory of Arizona, and for other Purposes. The act creates the Territory of Arizona from the portion of the Territory of New Mexico lying west of the 32nd meridian west from Washington (109°02′43″W). The boundaries of the Territory of New Mexico are now the same as the future State of New Mexico. |
| 1862 | June 19 | U.S. President Abraham Lincoln signs An Act to secure Freedom to all Persons within the Territories of the United States, granting freedom to the slaves in all U.S. territories including the Territory of New Mexico. |
| 1862 | March 28 | Colorado volunteers under the command of Colonel John P. Slough repulse Texas cavalry under the command of Lieutenant Colonel William Read Scurry at the Battle of Glorieta Pass. The battle effectively ends the Confederate New Mexico Campaign and the Confederate Territory of Arizona. |
| 1862 | March 10 | Texas cavalry under the command of Brigadier General Henry Hopkins Sibley occupy Santa Fe in the Confederate New Mexico Campaign. |
| 1862 | February 24 | Confederate President Jefferson Davis proclaims that the portion of the Territory of New Mexico lying south of the 34th parallel north is the Confederate Territory of Arizona. |
| 1861 | July 25 | Texas cavalry under the command of Lieutenant Colonel John R. Baylor invades the Territory of New Mexico and occupies the town of Mesilla. |
| 1861 | May 24 | U.S. President Abraham Lincoln appoints Henry Connelly the fifth Governor of the Territory of New Mexico. |
| 1861 | April 12 | The American Civil War begins with the Battle of Fort Sumter. |
| 1861 | March 4 | Abraham Lincoln assumes office as the 16th President of the United States. |
| 1861 | February 28 | U.S. President James Buchanan signs An Act to provide a temporary Government for the Territory of Colorado, creating the free Territory of Colorado. The Territory of Colorado annexes the portion of the Territory of New Mexico lying north of the 37th parallel north. The Territory of New Mexico now includes all of the future states of New Mexico and Arizona and the portion of the present-day State of Nevada lying south of the 37th parallel north. |
| 1861 | February 8 | The seven secessionist slave states create the Confederate States of America. |
| 1860 | November 6 | Abraham Lincoln is elected President of the United States. Seven slave states will secede from the United States of America before February 8, 1861. |
| 1860 | April 1 | The 1860 United States census enumerates the population of the Territory of New Mexico, later determined to be 93,516, an increase of 51.9 since the 1850 United States census. New Mexico becomes the second most populous of the seven U.S. territories. |
| 1860 | February 1 | The Territory of New Mexico creates Mora County from parts of Taos County and San Miguel County. |

== 1850s ==
| Year | Date | Event |
|---|---|---|
| 1857 | August 17 | U.S. President James Buchanan appoints Abraham Rencher the fourth Governor of the Territory of New Mexico. |
| 1854 | June 8 | The Gadsden Purchase goes into effect creating the current United States-Mexico border. The Territory of New Mexico now includes all of the future states of New Mexico and Arizona plus portions of the present-day states Nevada and Colorado. |
| 1853 | May 6 | U.S. President Franklin Pierce appoints David Meriwether the third Governor of the Territory of New Mexico. |
| 1852 | July 15 | U.S. President Millard Fillmore appoints William Carr Lane the second Governor of the Territory of New Mexico. |
| 1852 | January 9 | The Territory of New Mexico creates nine original counties: Bernalillo County, Doña Ana County, Rio Arriba County, San Miguel County, Santa Ana County, Santa Fe County, Socorro County, Taos County, and Valencia County. |
| 1851 | April 5 | The State of Deseret dissolves. |
| 1851 | January 9 | U.S. President Millard Fillmore appoints James S. Calhoun the first Governor of the Territory of New Mexico. |
1850
| 1850 | September 9 | The Territory of New Mexico and the Territory of Utah are established as part of the Compromise of 1850. U.S. President Millard Fillmore signs An Act proposing to the State of Texas the Establishment of her Northern and Western Boundaries, the Relinquishment by the said State of all Territory claimed by her exterior to said Boundaries, and of all her Claims upon the United States, and to establish a territorial Government for New Mexico. The Territory of New Mexico includes all of the future State of New Mexico except the southwestern corner lying south of the 32nd parallel north and west of the Rio Grande which remained a part of Mexico, plus most of the future State of Arizona and portions of the present-day states Nevada and Colorado. |
| 1850 | June 20 | In a failed attempt to organize a slave State of New Mexico, a state constitution is adopted by a vote of 6,771 to 39 and Henry Connelly is elected governor. Provisional Governor John Munroe refuses to let those elected take office without the express approval of the United States Congress. |
| 1850 | April 1 | The 1850 United States census makes the first enumeration of the population of the future Territory of New Mexico, later determined to be 61,547. |

== 1840s ==
| Year | Date | Event |
|---|---|---|
| 1849 | October 23 | Brevet Colonel John Munroe assumes command as the fourth (and last) U.S. provisional governor of New Mexico. |
| 1849 | March 10 | The Mormon settlers of the Great Salt Lake Valley form the Provisional Government of the State of Deseret. Brigham Young is elected Governor. Deseret encompasses almost all of the present U.S. states of Utah and Nevada, and portions of Oregon, Idaho, Wyoming, Colorado, New Mexico, Arizona, and California, although only the Wasatch Front was occupied. (Note: The Constitution of the State of Deseret states its boundaries as "commencing at the 33 degree of north latitude where it crosses the 108 degree of longitude west of Greenwich thence running south and west to and down the main channel of the Gila River on the northern line of Mexico and on the northern boundary of Lower California to the Pacific Ocean thence along the coast north westerly to 118 degrees 30 minutes of west longitude thence north to where said line intersects the dividing ridge of the Sierra Nevada mountains thence north along the summit of the Sierra Nevada mountains to the dividing range of mountains that separates the waters flowing into the Columbia River from the waters running into the Great Basin thence easterly along the dividing range of mountains that separates said waters flowing into the Columbia River on the north from the waters flowing into the Great Basin on the south to the summit of the Wind River chain of mountains thence south east and south by the dividing range of mountains that separate the waters flowing into the Gulf of Mexico from the waters flowing into the Gulf of California to the place of beginning as set forth in a map drawn by Charles Preuss and published by order of the Senate of the United States in 1848." This ambitious claim included the future cities of Las Vegas, Phoenix, San Diego, and Los Angeles.) Deseret served as the de facto government of the Wasatch Front until the Provisional State was dissolved on April 4, 1851. |
| 1848 | October 11 | Brevet Lieutenant Colonel John M. Washington assumes command as the third U.S. provisional governor of New Mexico. |
| 1848 | February 2 | The United States and United Mexican States sign the Treaty of Guadalupe Hidalgo to end the Mexican–American War. Mexico relinquishes its northern territories. All land in the future State of New Mexico north of the Mexican border becomes unorganized United States territory. |
| 1847 | January 19 | U.S. civilian governor Charles Bent is killed by a band of insurgents at his home in Taos. First Secretary Donaciano Vigil assumes office as the second U.S. civilian governor of New Mexico. |
| 1846 | September 25 | General Stephen W. Kearny and troops depart for California. Colonel Sterling Price assumes command as the second U.S. military governor of New Mexico. |
| 1846 | September 22 | Brigadier General Stephen W. Kearny appoints Charles Bent as the first U.S. civilian governor of New Mexico. |
| 1846 | August 22 | Brigadier General Stephen W. Kearny assumes command as the first U.S. military governor of New Mexico. |
| 1846 | August 18 | Troops under the command of General Stephen W. Kearny seize Santa Fe for the United States with little resistance. |
| 1846 | August 15 | U.S. Army troops under the command of Brigadier General Stephen W. Kearny enter Las Vegas, New Mexico. General Kearny proclaims that all of New Mexico is now under United States rule. |
| 1846 | May 13 | The United States declares war on the Mexican Republic. |
| 1846 | April 25 | The Thornton Affair becomes the first skirmish of the Mexican–American War. |
| 1846 | February 14 | The State of Texas cedes the territorial claims of the Republic of Texas to the United States. The boundaries of the State of Texas within that territory remain undefined. The United States now claims the Rio Grande as its border with Mexico. |
| 1845 | December 29 | The United States admits the Republic of Texas to the Union as the slave State of Texas but declines to define its borders. The Mexican Republic maintains that Texas is still its territory by the Treaty of Limits of 1828 and states that it will fight to regain Texas. |
| 1845 | November 16 | Manuel Armijo is appointed Gobernador de Santa Fe de Nuevo México for a third term. |
| 1845 | May 1 | José Chavéz y Castillo is appointed Gobernador de Santa Fe de Nuevo México. |
| 1844 | June 17 | Santa Fe de Nuevo México is divided into three districts and 21 counties. The population is 67,736. |
| 1844 | March 30 | Mariano Martínez de Lejanza is appointed Gobernador de Santa Fe de Nuevo México. |
| 1841 | October 5 | The Republic of Texas Santa Fe Expedition surrenders to Nuevo México troops under the command of Gobernador Manuel Armijo. |

== 1830s ==
| Year | Date | Event |
|---|---|---|
| 1837 | | Manuel Armijo is appointed Gobernador de Santa Fe de Nuevo México for a second term. |
| 1837 | March 6 | U.S. Secretary of State John Forsyth accepts the credentials of William H. Wharton as Republic of Texas Minister to the United States of America. Mexico protests the United States recognition of the Republic of Texas as a violation of the Treaty of Limits of 1828. |
| 1836 | May 14 | Texians force captured General Santa Anna to sign the coerced Treaties of Velasco recognizing the independence of the Republic of Texas. Mexico neither acknowledges nor ratifies these treaties. Based upon these treaties, the Republic of Texas claims all land north and east of the Rio Grande del Norte to the United States border and the 45th parallel north. The Republic of Texas never occupies the region west of the 100th meridian west and this western region remains in Mexican hands. The disputed region will later become portions of the future U.S. states of New Mexico, Texas, Oklahoma, Kansas, Colorado, and Wyoming. |
| 1836 | May 2 | Texians (immigrants from the United States living in the Mexican state of Coahuila y Tejas) declare the independence of the Republic of Texas from Mexico. |
| 1835 | October 2 | The Texian Revolt begins with the Battle of Gonzales. |
| 1835 | July | Albino Pérez is appointed Gobernador de Santa Fe de Nuevo México. |
| 1833 | | Francisco Sarracino is appointed Gobernador de Santa Fe de Nuevo México. |
| 1832 | | Santiago Abreú is appointed Gobernador de Santa Fe de Nuevo México. |

== 1820s ==
| Year | Date | Event |
|---|---|---|
| 1828 | January 12 | The United States and Mexico sign the Treaty of Limits affirming the boundaries set by the Adams–Onís Treaty of 1819. |
| 1829 | September | José Antonio Chaves assumes office as the seventh Géfe político de Santa Fe de Nuevo México. |
| 1827 | May | Manuel Armijo assumes office as the sixth Géfe político de Santa Fe de Nuevo México. |
| 1825 | September | Antonio Narbona assumes office as the fifth Géfe político de Santa Fe de Nuevo México. |
| 1823 | August | Bartolomé Baca assumes office as the fourth Géfe político de Santa Fe de Nuevo México. |
| 1822 | November | José Antonio Vizcarra assumes office as the third Géfe político de Santa Fe de Nuevo México. |
| 1822 | July 5 | Francisco Xavier Chávez assumes office as the second Géfe político de Santa Fe de Nuevo México. |
| 1821 | December 26 | Spanish Gobernador Facundo Melgares receives orders that Santa Fe de Nuevo México is now an intendance of the Mexican Empire. Melgares swears fealty to the empire and becomes the first Mexican Géfe político de Santa Fe de Nuevo México. |
| 1821 | September 1 | William Becknell and a party of frontier traders leave New Franklin, Missouri bound for Santa Fe by way of the upper Arkansas and Purgatoire rivers. The Becknell route will become the Mountain Branch of the Santa Fe Trail. |
| 1821 | August 24 | Ferdinand VII of Spain signs the Treaty of Córdoba recognizing the independence of the Mexican Empire. |
| 1821 | February 22 | The Adams–Onís Treaty of 1819 takes effect. The United States relinquishes all land in the future State of New Mexico. |

== 1810s ==
| Year | Date | Event |
|---|---|---|
| 1819 | March 2 | U.S. President James Monroe signs An Act establishing a separate territorial government in the southern part of the territory of Missouri, creating the Territory of Arkansaw. |
| 1819 | February 22 | The United States and the restored Kingdom of Spain sign the Adams–Onís Treaty. The United States relinquishes its claim to land west of the 100th meridian west of Greenwich and south and west of the Arkansas River and south of the 42nd parallel north. Spain relinquishes Florida and all claims to land north of the 42nd parallel in North America. |
| 1818 | | Capitán Don Facundo Melgares is appointed the (last) Spanish Gobernador de Nuevo Méjico. |
| 1816 | | Don Pedro Maria de Allande is appointed Gobernador de Nuevo Méjico. |
| 1814 | | Don Alberto Maynez is appointed Gobernador de Nuevo Méjico for a second term. |
| 1812 | June 4 | U.S. President James Madison signs An Act providing for the government of the territory of Missouri. The Territory of Louisiana is renamed the Territory of Missouri. |
| 1810 | August 1 | Mexican priest Miguel Gregorio Antonio Ignacio Hidalgo-Costilla y Gallaga Mandarte Villaseñor (Hidalgo) proclaims the independence of Mexico from the Napoleonic Kingdom of Spain in the village of Dolores. |
| 1810 | | Zebulon Pike publishes The expeditions of Zebulon Montgomery Pike to Headwaters of the Mississippi River, through Louisiana Territory, and in New Spain, during the Years 1805-6-7. His journals will become a popular guide to the Upper Mississippi Basin, the Great Plains, and the Southern Rocky Mountains. |

== 1800s ==
| Year | Date | Event |
|---|---|---|
| 1808 | | Teniente coronel Don Jose Manrique is appointed Gobernador de Nuevo Méjico. |
| 1807 | | Don Alberto Maynez is appointed Gobernador de Nuevo Méjico. |
| 1807 | February 26 | Spanish cavalrymen arrest the U.S. Army reconnaissance expedition led by Captain Zebulon Pike in the San Luis Valley. The reconnaissance party will be taken to Santa Fe, then Chihuahua, before being expelled from Nueva España on July 1, 1807. |
| 1805 | March 3 | U.S. President Thomas Jefferson signs An Act further providing for the government of the district of Louisiana. The District of Louisiana is reorganized as the self-governing Territory of Louisiana. The Territory of Louisiana includes the disputed northeastern portion of the future State of New Mexico in the Mississippi River watershed. |
| 1804 | October 1 | The District of Louisiana is organized under the jurisdiction of the Territory of Indiana. |
| 1804 | | Coronel Don Joaquín del Real Alencaster is appointed Gobernador de Nuevo Méjico. |
| 1804 | March 26 | U.S. President Thomas Jefferson signs An Act erecting Louisiana into two territories, and providing for the temporary government thereof. The portion of the Louisiana Purchase north of the 33rd parallel north is designated the military District of Louisiana. |
| 1803 | December 20 | France turns its colony of La Louisiane over to the United States. The United States and Spain disagree over the western boundary of the territory. The United States maintains that Louisiana includes the Mississippi River and its entire western drainage basin. Spain maintains that its territory includes (1) all land west of the Continental Divide of the Americas including Alta California, and (2) all land south of the Arkansas River and west of the Medina River including Santa Fe de Nuevo México, and (3) all land south of the Red River and west of the Calcasieu River including Tejas. The area in dispute includes the northeastern portion of the future State of New Mexico in the Mississippi River watershed. |
| 1803 | April 30 | The United States and the French Republic sign the Louisiana Purchase Treaty. |
| 1800 | October 1 | Under pressure from Napoléon Bonaparte, the Kingdom of Spain transfers the colony of la Luisiana back to the French Republic with the secret Third Treaty of San Ildefonso. |

== 1790s ==
| Year | Date | Event |
|---|---|---|
| 1793 | August 16 | Teniente coronel Don Fernando Chacón is appointed Gobernador de Nuevo Méjico. |
| 1792 | October 3 | French frontiersman Pierre "Pedro" Vial arrives in Saint-Louis from the Spanish settlement of Santa Fe. The route he followed will become the Cimarron Branch of the Santa Fe Trail. |

== 1780s ==
| Year | Date | Event |
|---|---|---|
| 1788 | | Don Fernando de la Concha is appointed Gobernador de Nuevo México. |
| 1783 | September 3 | The Treaty of Paris is signed in Paris by representatives of King George III of Great Britain and representatives of the United States of America. The treaty affirms the independence of the United States and sets the Mississippi River as its western boundary. |

== 1770s ==
| Year | Date | Event |
|---|---|---|
| 1778 | | Teniente coronel Don Juan Bautista de Anza is appointed Gobernador de Nuevo México. |
| 1778 | | Bernardo de Miera y Pacheco, cartographer for the Dominguez–Escalante Expedition, publishes his map of the expedition across the Colorado Plateau. His map becomes the foundation of a future trade route later known as the Old Spanish Trail. |
| 1778 | | Don Francisco Trebol Navarro is appointed Gobernador de Nuevo Méjico. |
| 1776 | July 29 | A Spanish-Franciscan expedition led by Franciscan priests Francisco Atanasio Domínguez and Silvestre Vélez de Escalante sets out from La Villa Real de la Santa Fé de San Francisco de Asís (Santa Fe) in search of an overland route to the Presidio Reál de San Carlos de Monterey (Monterey). The expedition follows the 1765 route of Juan Rivera northwest across the Colorado Plateau. The expedition fails to reach Las Californias, but reaches the lower Paria River in the future State of Arizona before returning to Santa Fe. |
| 1776 | July 4 | Representatives of the thirteen United States of America sign the Declaration of Independence from the Kingdom of Great Britain. |

== 1760s ==
| Year | Date | Event |
|---|---|---|
| 1767 | | Capitán Don Pedro Fermín de Mendinueta is appointed Gobernador de Nuevo Méjico. |
| 1765 | July | Governor Don Tomás Vélez Cachupin dispatches an expedition led by Juan Maria Antonio Rivera to explore the San Juan Mountains and the Colorado Plateau. |
| 1762 | November 13 | Fearing the loss of its American territories in the Seven Years' War, the Kingdom of France transfers its colony of La Louisiane to the Kingdom of Spain with the secret Treaty of Fontainebleau. This ends the competition between France and Spain on the Great Plains. |
| 1761 | March 14 | King Charles III of Spain appoints Don Tomás Vélez Cachupin Gobernador de Nuevo Méjico for a second term. |
| 1760 | May 10 | Don Manuel de Portillo y Urrisola is appointed Gobernador de Nuevo Méjico. |
| 1760 | | King Charles III of Spain appoints Don Mateo Antonio de Mendoza Gobernador de Nuevo Méjico. |

== 1750s ==
| Year | Date | Event |
|---|---|---|
| 1754 | | Don Francisco Antonio Marín del Valle is appointed Gobernador de Nuevo Méjico. |

== 1740s ==
| Year | Date | Event |
|---|---|---|
| 1749 | | Don Tomás Vélez Cachupín is appointed Gobernador de Nuevo Méjico. |
| 1743 | | Don Joaquín Codallos y Rabal is appointed Gobernador de Nuevo Méjico. |

== 1730s ==
| Year | Date | Event |
|---|---|---|
| 1739 | July 5 | On a voyage up the Arkansas River to the confluence of the Purgatoire River, Pierre Antoine and Paul Mallet encounter an Arikara man who agrees to guide them to Santa Fe. This is the first contact between France and Spain in the Rocky Mountain region. |
| 1739 | January | Don Gaspar Domingo de Mendoza is inaugurated as Gobernador de Nuevo Méjico. |
| 1737 | May 12 | King Philip V of Spain appoints Don Gaspar Domingo de Mendoza as Gobernador de Nuevo Méjico. |
| 1736 | | Don Henrique de Olavide y Michelena is appointed Gobernador de Nuevo Méjico. |
| 1731 | | Don Gervasio Cruzat y Gongora is appointed Gobernador de Nuevo Méjico. |

== 1720s ==
| Year | Date | Event |
|---|---|---|
| 1722 | August | Don Juan Domingo de Bustamante is appointed Gobernador de Nuevo Méjico. |

== 1710s ==
| Year | Date | Event |
|---|---|---|
| 1717 | | Capitán Don Antonio Valverde y Cosío is appointed Gobernador de Nuevo Méjico. |
| 1717 | | Capitán Don Juan Paez Hurtado is appointed Gobernador de Nuevo Méjico. |
| 1715 | December 1 | Capitán Don Félix Martínez de Torrelaguna is inaugurated as Gobernador de Nuevo Méjico. |
| 1712 | October 5 | Don Juan Ignacio Flores Mogollon is inaugurated as Gobernador de Nuevo Méjico. |

== 1700s ==
| Year | Date | Event |
|---|---|---|
| 1707 | August | Almirante Don Jose Chacón Medina Salazar y Villaseñor is appointed Gobernador de Nuevo Méjico. |
| 1706 | April 23 | Gobernador Valdez establishes La Villa Real de San Francisco de Alburquerque on the Rio Grande. |
| 1705 | June | Don Francisco Cuervo y Valdez is appointed Gobernador de Nuevo Méjico. |
| 1704 | | Capitán Don Don Juan Paez Hurtado is appointed Gobernador de Nuevo Méjico. |
| 1703 | | Diego de Vargas Zapata y Luján Ponce de León y Contreras is appointed Gobernador de Nuevo Méjico for a second term. |

== 1690s ==
| Year | Date | Event |
|---|---|---|
| 1697 | July 2 | Don Pedro Rodriguez Cubero is inaugurated as Gobernador de Nuevo Méjico. |
| 1692 | September 14 | Diego de Vargas Zapata y Luján Ponce de León y Contreras completes the reconquest of the Spanish colony of Santa Fe de Nuevo Méjico to end the Pueblo Revolt. |
| 1692 | June 6 | King Charles II of Spain appoints Don Pedro Rodríguez Cubero Gobernador de Nuevo Méjico. Cubero delays his departure from Cuba on grounds of health. |
| 1691 | February 22 | Diego de Vargas Zapata y Luján Ponce de León y Contreras is inaugurated as Gobernador de Nuevo Méjico at El Paso del Norte. |

== 1680s ==
| Year | Date | Event |
|---|---|---|
| 1689 | | Capitán Don Domingo Jironza Petriz de Cruzate serves as Gobernador de Nuevo Méjico in exile |
| 1688 | | Diego de Vargas Zapata y Luján Ponce de León y Contreras is appointed Gobernador de Nuevo Méjico. |
| 1686 | | Don Pedro Reneros de Posada is appointed Gobernador de Nuevo Méjico in exile. |
| 1683 | | Capitán Don Domingo Jironza Petriz de Cruzate is appointed Gobernador de Nuevo Méjico in exile. |
| 1682 | April 9 | René-Robert Cavelier, Sieur de La Salle, claims the Mississippi River and its watershed for the Kingdom of France and names the region La Louisiane in honor of King Louis XIV. The Mississippi Basin is later determined to be the fourth most extensive on Earth and includes lands inhabited by hundreds of thousands of native peoples and lands previously claimed by Spain, France, and England. The Louisiane claim includes the northeast portion the future State of New Mexico in the Mississippi River watershed. This will set up a rivalry among native peoples, France, Spain, and eventually the United States in the area. |
| 1680 | August 13 | Tewa shaman Popé of Ohkay Owingeh leads the Pueblo Revolt against the Spanish rulers of Santa Fe de Nuevo Méjico. The Spanish settlers flee down the Rio Grande to El Paso del Norte. |

== 1670s ==
| Year | Date | Event |
|---|---|---|
| 1677 | | Capitán Don Antonio de Otermín is appointed Gobernador de Nuevo Méjico. |
| 1675 | | Capitán Don Juan Francisco Treviño is appointed Gobernador de Nuevo Méjico. |
| 1671 | | General Don Juan Durán de Miranda is appointed Gobernador de Nuevo Méjico for a second term. |

== 1660s ==
| Year | Date | Event |
|---|---|---|
| 1668 | | Capitán Don Juan de Medrano y Mesía is appointed Gobernador de Nuevo Méjico. |
| 1665 | January 14 | Capitán Don Fernando de Villanueva y Armendaris is appointed Gobernador de Nuevo Méjico. |
| 1664 | | Capitán Don Juan Durán de Miranda is appointed Gobernador de Nuevo Méjico. |
| 1664 | | Capitán Don Tomé Domínguez de Mendoza is appointed Gobernador de Nuevo Méjico. |
| 1662 | March 6 | Governor Don Diego Dionisio de Peñalosa Briceño y Berdugo leads a military expedition in search of the legendary Quivira. |
| 1661 | | Capitán Don Diego Dionisio de Peñalosa Briceño y Berdugo is appointed Gobernador de Nuevo Méjico. |

== 1650s ==
| Year | Date | Event |
|---|---|---|
| 1659 | July 11 | Capitán Don Bernardo López de Mendizábal is inaugurated as Gobernador de Nuevo Méjico. |
| 1656 | | Capitán Don Juan Manso de Contreras is appointed Gobernador de Nuevo Méjico. |
| 1653 | | Don Juan de Samaniego y Díez de Ulzurrun Xaca y Roncal is appointed Gobernador de Nuevo Méjico. |

== 1640s ==
| Year | Date | Event |
|---|---|---|
| 1649 | | Capitán Don Hernando de Ugarte y la Concha is appointed Gobernador de Nuevo Méjico. |
| 1646 | June 18 | Capitán Don Luis de Guzmán y Figueroa is appointed Gobernador de Nuevo Méjico. |
| 1644 | | Capitán Don Fernando de Argüello Carvajál is appointed Gobernador de Nuevo Méjico. |
| 1642 | | Capitán Don Alonso de Pacheco de Herédia is appointed Gobernador de Nuevo Méjico. |
| 1641 | Autumn | Sargento Francisco Gomes assumes office as Gobernador de Nuevo Méjico on the death of Gobernador Valdés |
| 1641 | March | General Don Juan Flores de Sierra y Valdés is appointed Gobernador de Nuevo Méjico. |

== 1630s ==
| Year | Date | Event |
|---|---|---|
| 1637 | April 18 | Capitán Don Luís de Rosas is inaugurated as Gobernador de Nuevo Méjico. |
| 1634 | November | Capitán Don Francisco Martínez de Baeza is appointed Gobernador de Nuevo Méjico. |
| 1632 | March | Capitán Don Francisco de la Mora y Ceballos is appointed Gobernador de Nuevo Méjico. |

== 1620s ==
| Year | Date | Event |
|---|---|---|
| 1629 | May 1 | Capitán Don Francisco Manuel de Silva Nieto is inaugurated as Gobernador de Nuevo Méjico. |
| 1625 | | Almirante Don Felipe de Sotelo Osorio is appointed Gobernador de Nuevo Méjico. |

== 1610s ==
| Year | Date | Event |
|---|---|---|
| 1618 | | Juan Álvarez de Eulate y Ladrón de Cegama is appointed Gobernador de Nuevo Méjico. |
| 1614 | | Almirante Don Don Bernardino de Ceballos is appointed Gobernador de Nuevo Méjico. |
| 1610 | | Governor Don Pedro de Peralta moves the capital of Santa Fe de Nuevo Méjico to La Villa Real de la Santa Fe de San Francisco de Asís. |

== 1600s ==
| Year | Date | Event |
|---|---|---|
| 1609 | | Don Pedro de Peralta is appointed Gobernador de Nuevo Méjico. |
| 1607 | | Don Pedro de Peralta establishes La Villa Real de la Santa Fe de San Francisco de Asís at the Tiwa village of Ogapoge on the Santa Fe River. |
| 1606 | | Don Juan de Oñate y Salazar is recalled to México to answer charges to brutality against indigenous peoples. Don Cristóbal De Oñate assumes his father's office. |

=== 1590s ===
| Year | Date | Event |
|---|---|---|
| 1598 | July 12 | Don Juan de Oñate Salazar establishes the New Spain (Nueva España) colony of Santa Fe de Nuevo Méjico at the village of San Juan de los Caballeros adjacent to the Ohkay Owingeh Pueblo at the confluence of the Rio Grande (río Bravo) and the río Chama. At its greatest extent, the colony encompassed all of the present U.S. state of New Mexico and portions of Arizona, Utah, Colorado, Wyoming, Nebraska, Kansas, Oklahoma, Texas, and the Mexican state of Chihuahua. (Note: At its greatest territorial extent, the Spanish Empire claimed that the border of its colony of New Mexico (Santa Fe de Nuevo México) began where the 31st parallel north crossed 100th meridian west, thence north along the 100th meridian west to the 42nd parallel north, thence west along the 42nd parallel north to the Green River (río Español), thence down the Green River to its confluence with the Colorado River (río Colorado), thence down the Colorado River to its confluence with the Gila River (río Gila), thence up the Gila River up to its confluence with its East Fork and West Fork, thence south along the meridian 108°12′22″ west to the 31st parallel north, thence east along the 31st parallel north back to the 100th meridian west.) |

== 1540s ==
| Year | Date | Event |
|---|---|---|
| 1541 | June 28 | A Spanish military expedition led by Hernando de Soto, Governor of Cuba, become the first Europeans to cross the Mississippi River. |
| 1541 | spring | The military expedition led by Francisco Vásquez de Coronado leaves the Tiwa pueblos and searches the Great Plains for Quivira. |
| 1541 | winter | The Tiwa resist the occupation by the Coronado expedition but hundreds are killed in the Tiguex War. |
| 1540 | autumn | The military expedition led by Francisco Vásquez de Coronado, reaches the Tiwa pueblos along the Río Bravo (Rio Grande). The expedition occupies several of the pueblos. |
| 1540 | July 7 | The military expedition led by Francisco Vásquez de Coronado, reaches the Zuni pueblo of Hawikuh. The Zuni resist but are driven off by the Spanish soldiers. Fray Marcos de Niza returns to Compostela in disgrace. |
| 1540 | February 23 | Francisco Vásquez de Coronado, Governor of Nueva Galicia, departs Compostela, México commanding a Spanish military expedition of 400 soldiers, 1,300 to 2,000 Mexican Indian allies, four Franciscan friars including Marcos de Niza and Juan de Padilla, and several slaves. |

== 1530s ==
| Year | Date | Event |
|---|---|---|
| 1539 | September | Fray Marcos de Niza returns to San Miguel de Culiacán after a distant view of the Zuni pueblo of Hawikuh. His glowing reports of Hawikuh inspire the 1540–1542 expedition of Francisco Vásquez de Coronado. |
| 1539 | March | Mustafa Azemmouri leaves San Miguel de Culiacán followed by Fray Marcos de Niza in search of the Seven Cities of Cibola. Mustafa Azemmouri is murdered at the Zuni pueblo of Hawikuh. |
| 1536 | July | The four survivors of the Narváez expedition of 1527 arrive in Mexico City. Reports of their travels inspire stories of the Seven Cities of Cibola. |
| 1535 | | The four survivors of the Narváez expedition of 1527: Álvar Núñez Cabeza de Vaca, Andrés Dorantes de Carranza, Alonso del Castillo Maldonado, and Mustafa Azemmouri (slave name: Estevanico), may have traveled through the southwestern portion of the future State of New Mexico. |

== 1510s ==
| Year | Date | Event |
|---|---|---|
| 1519 | Autumn | A Spanish naval expedition along the northeastern coast of Mexico charts the mouths of several rivers including the Río de Nuestra Señora (Rio Grande). |
| 1513 | September 29 | Spanish conquistador Vasco Núñez de Balboa crosses the Isthmus of Panama and arrives on the shore of a sea that he names Mar del Sur (the South Sea, later named the Pacific Ocean). He claims the sea and all adjacent lands for the Queen of Castile. This includes the portion of the future State of New Mexico west of the Continental Divide of the Americas. |

== 1490s ==
| Year | Date | Event |
|---|---|---|
| 1493 | May 5 | Pope Alexander VI (born Roderic de Borja in Valencia) issues the papal bull Inter caetera which splits the non-Christian world into two-halves. The eastern half goes to the King of Portugal for his exploration, conquest, conversion, and exploitation. The western half (including all of North America) goes to the Queen of Castile and the King of Aragon for their exploration, conquest, conversion, and exploitation. The indigenous peoples of the Americas have no idea that any of these people exist. |
| 1492 | October 12 | Genoese seaman Cristòffa Cómbo (Christopher Columbus) leading an expedition for Queen Isabella I of Castile lands on the Lucayan island of Guanahani that he renames San Salvador. This begins the Spanish conquest of the Americas. |

== Before 1492 ==
| Era | Event |
|---|---|
| 1300–1525 CE | Jicarilla Apache migrate from Alaska and Northwestern Canada to the southern extent of the Rocky Mountains. |
| 1276–1299 CE | A prolonged drought on the Colorado Plateau forces many Ancestral Puebloans to migrate southeast into the Rio Grande Valley. |
| c. 9290 BCE | Paleo-Indians of the Clovis culture camp at Blackwater Draw. |
| c. 12,000 BCE | During a centuries long period of warming, ice-age Paleoamericans from Beringia begin using the ice-free corridor east of the Rocky Mountains to migrate throughout the Americas. |

2000s 1900s Statehood 1800s Territory 1700s 1600s 1500s Before 1492

== See also ==
- Government of New Mexico
  - List of governors of New Mexico
  - List of Mexican governors of New Mexico
  - List of Spanish governors of New Mexico
  - List of New Mexico state legislatures
- History of New Mexico
  - History of slavery in New Mexico
  - List of counties in New Mexico
  - List of ghost towns in New Mexico
  - List of municipalities in New Mexico
- Index of New Mexico-related articles
- Indigenous peoples of the North American Southwest
- Outline of New Mexico
- Southwestern archaeology
- Territorial evolution of New Mexico
  - Santa Fe de Nuevo México
  - U.S. provisional government of New Mexico
  - Territory of New Mexico
  - State of New Mexico
- Timeline of New Mexico history
  - Timeline of Albuquerque, New Mexico
  - Timeline of Santa Fe, New Mexico
