= Manuel de Portillo y Urrisola =

Manuel de Portillo y Urrizola

51st Spanish Governor of New Mexico
- In office May 10, 1760 – 1762
- Preceded by: Mateo Antonio de Mendoza
- Succeeded by: Tomás Vélez Cachupín

Personal details
- Born: Valencia, Spain
- Profession: Judge and governor of colonial New Mexico

Manuel de Portillo y Urrisola, also known as Manuel de Portillo y Urrizola, was a judge who served as the acting Spanish colonial governor of Santa Fe de Nuevo México province (present day New Mexico) from 1760 to 1762, located in the northern Viceroyalty of New Spain (colonial México).

== Biography ==
Portillo y Urrizola served as a judge in New Mexico during a certain period of time. So, he worked as judge for Francisco Antonio Marín del Valle, another governor of New Mexico.

Portillo y Urrizola was appointed Acting Governor of Santa Fe de Nuevo México on May 10, 1760, replacing Mateo Antonio de Mendoza. In 1761, the Apaches violently attacked the Pueblo of Taos, New Mexico. To punish them for that, Portillo y Urrizola sent a military campaign against the Apaches, which ended with the murder of 400 people of this ethnicity. Moreover, Urrisola repressed a group of Comanches who were trading with Taos.

Manuel de Portillo y Urrizola was replaced in 1762 by Tomás Vélez Cachupín as governor of Santa Fe de Nuevo México province.

== See also ==
- Colonial New Mexico
- List of Spanish governors of New Mexico
