= Supply of Franciscan missions in New Mexico =

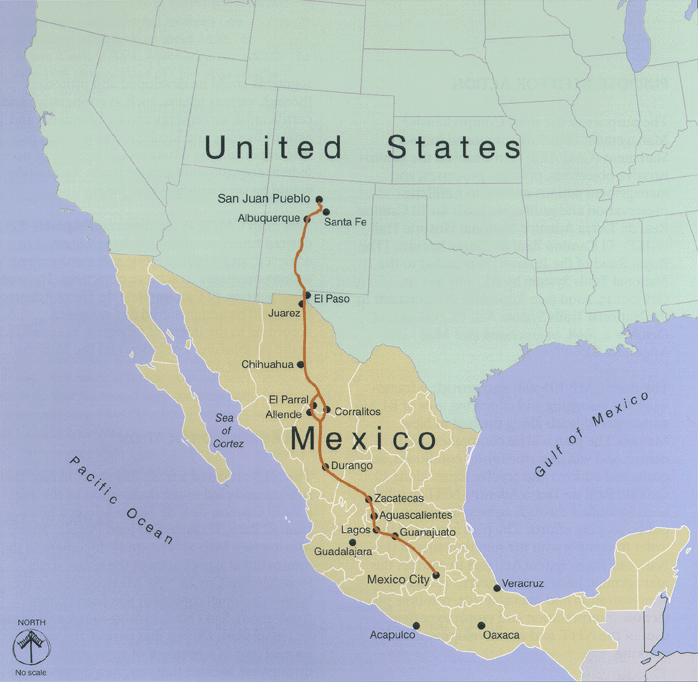
The Camino Real de Tierra Adentro from Mexico City to New Mexico.

The supply of Franciscan missions in New Mexico was the provision of supplies to Franciscan missionaries in the Spanish colony of New Mexico during the 17th century. Caravans of mule-drawn carts loaded with supplies left Mexico City every three years for a 1,600 miles (2,600 km) one-way journey to New Mexico. The journey required 18-months for a round trip. The supply trains were the main means of contact between New Mexico and the Spanish government in Mexico City. The cost of the supply trains was borne by the viceroy of New Spain. The Franciscans' goal was to convert to Christianity the American Indians in New Mexico, especially the Puebloans.

== 17th century ==
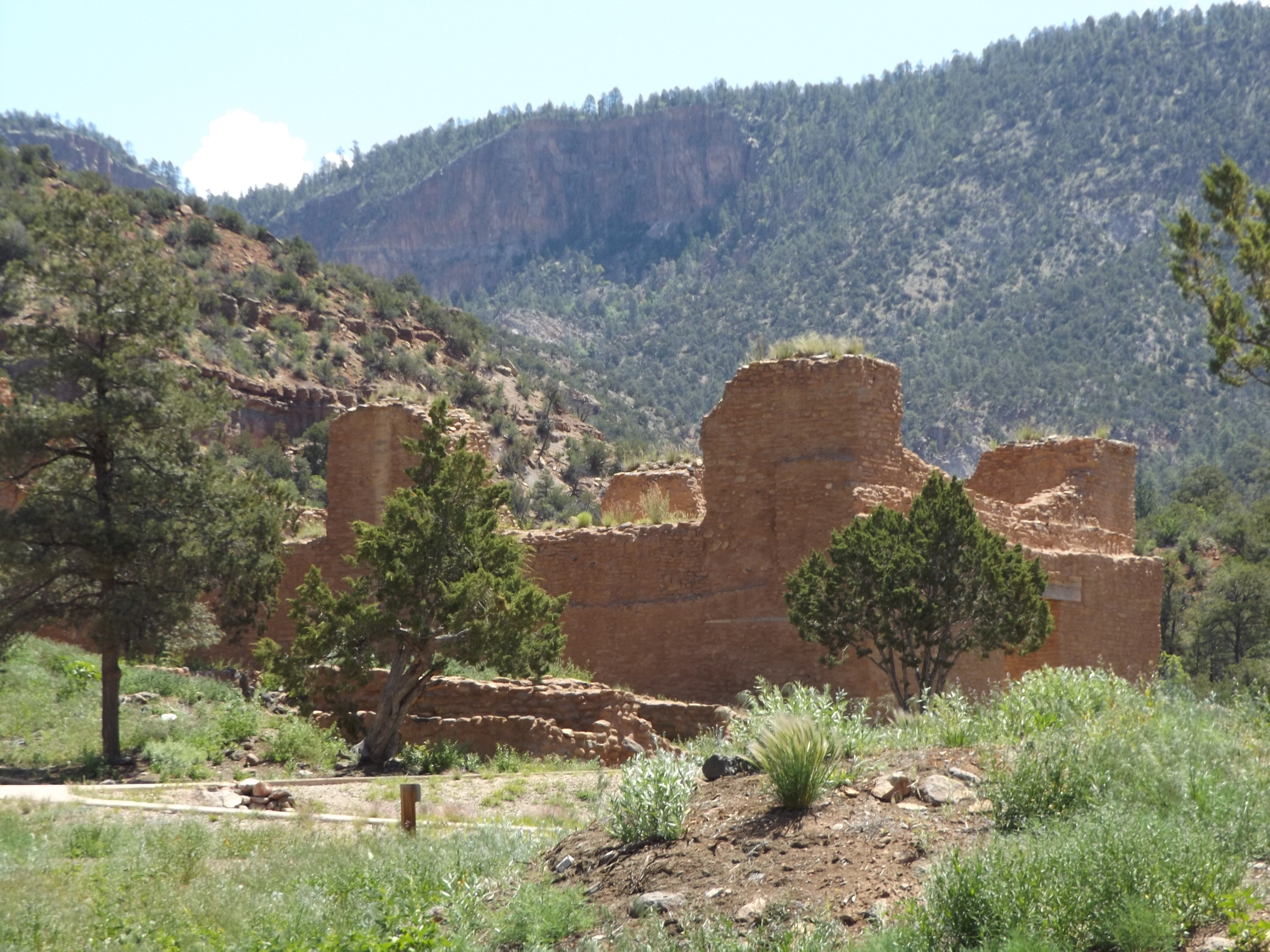
The ruins of the 17th century San José de los Jémez Mission church and the Gíusewa Pueblo.

In 1598, Juan de Oñate and more than 500 colonists, including 129 soldiers and their families, plus 7,000 head of livestock departed Santa Barbara, Chihuahua, the northernmost Spanish settlement in New Spain (Mexico) and journeyed by oxcart overland 700 miles (1,100 km) to found the colony of Santa Fe de Nuevo Mexico in the Rio Grande valley of present-day New Mexico. Oñate pioneered the route called the Camino Real de Tierra Adentro (Royal Road of the Interior) which would be the lifeline of the colony of New Mexico for more than 200 years. With Oñate were 10 Franciscan friars led by Alonso Martinez who would attempt to Christianize the Puebloan people residing in New Mexico. Despite deaths and departures, the number of Franciscans in New Mexico increased to 46 in 1631, including 35 friars and 11 lay brothers.

In 1608, the missionaries reported to the Viceroy that 8,000 Puebloans had been baptized. (Discouraged Franciscans in 1607 had reported that the number of "real converts" to Christianity was about 400.) In 1609, influenced by the favorable report of progress in Christianization, Spain accepted responsibility for supplying the New Mexican missions, the costs to be paid by the government of New Spain in Mexico City, thereby formalizing a system of regular supply of goods and personnel for New Mexico's Franciscan missions and missionaries. However, the viceroy was concerned about excessive costs of the supply which in 1629 totaled 81,000 pesos (about 2 million dollars in 2023 silver prices). To improve the service and to reduce expenses, the viceroy regularized the supply system, decreeing that a supply caravan should be sent to New Mexico every three years and organized with a meticulously detailed list of goods, salaries, and expenses that would be provided for the missions and the missionaries. The total cost of each supply was estimated at more than 60,000 pesos, not counting the cost of the military escort for the caravan. The cost of supplying the missionary enterprise in New Mexico exceeded the cost to Spain of financing the civil and military government in New Mexico, although many civil and military expenses in New Mexico were financed locally.

=== The supply caravans ===
The challenges to supplying the missions and missionaries in New Mexico were daunting. The distance via the Camino Real from Mexico City of New Mexico was 1,600 miles (2,600 km). Much of the route was through waterless desert and the caravans were threatened by hostile American Indians. The caravans consisted of 32 wagons, each with four iron wheels, pulled by eight mules, and with a capacity of 4,000 lb (1,800 kg). Sixteen mules were allocated for each wagon to have replacements for losses en route. Other livestock, such as sheep, cattle, and horses, accompanied the caravan. The caravans departed Mexico City every three years. The round trip took 18 months: six months to travel from Mexico City to New Mexico; six months to rest and refit; and six months to return to Mexico City. After the return to Mexico City, eighteen months were taken to organize the next caravan. The leadership, the "procurador general," of the caravan from 1631 until 1656 was Friar Tomás Manso who made nine round trips during the 25 years he was the procurador. Under him was another friar and several mayordomos, plus drivers, servants, and Indian workers. Tomas Manso's brother, Juan Manso de Contreras, worked with him on the caravans from 1652 to 1656, when he became governor of New Mexico. A military escort of fourteen soldiers accompanied the caravan.

Accompanying the caravan were settlers, traders, returning residents and often a new governor of New Mexico. On the return from New Mexico, the caravan included many of the same people and sometimes prisoners of the inquisition being sent to Mexico City for trial. The wagons carried back products of New Mexico such as bison hides, salt, piñon nuts, and mantas woven by the Puebloans. The governors of New Mexico had the goal of enriching themselves during their terms in office and the caravan was their opportunity to send salable products back to markets in Mexico.

In 1664, as a cost saving measure the supply caravans were put under secular control and the number of wagons sent each three years to New Mexico was reduced to 22. The Franciscans opposed the new system and in 1671, the viceroy decided instead to provide each priest an annual allowance of 330 pesos and each lay person 230 pesos with the Franciscans responsible for utilizing the money to buy supplies and pay for transport to New Mexico. This system had become practical because of increased wagon traffic from Mexico to New Mexico and continued until 1821 when Spanish rule of New Mexico ended with the Mexican Revolution.

The supply caravans came to a sudden, albeit temporary, end in 1680 when the Puebloans revolted in New Mexico, killing 400 Spaniards and their Indian allies, including 21 of the 33 Franciscan priests in the colony, and forcing the remaining 2,000 Spaniards and Indian allies to flee to El Paso.

== 18th century ==
The Spanish returned to New Mexico between 1692 and 1696, overcoming scattered opposition from the Puebloans. The situation had changed since their expulsion. The Apache were an increased threat and both Spanish and Puebloans perceived that cooperation with each other for defense was desirable. The Spanish had also become aware that French traders were advancing westward onto the Great Plains, posing a threat to New Spain and causing the Spanish to regard New Mexico as important for defense. The Franciscan missionaries had lost their enthusiasm for making New Mexico a theocracy and had a more tolerant attitude toward the Puebloan religion and customs. In the 18th century the civil and military authorities dominated the colony rather than the religious. The Camino Real stretching south to Mexico was still vital for the colony's survival, but as the century rolled on Mexican cities such as Chihuahua became the main sources of supply and trade for New Mexico. Chihuahua was 580 miles (930 km) south of Santa Fe via the Camino Real rather than the 1,600 miles (2,600 km) distance to Mexico City. Supply for the people and missions in New Mexico became easier and cheaper.
