= List of governors of the Spanish Mariana Islands =

This is a list of governors of the Spanish Mariana Islands. The Mariana Islands belonged to the Captaincy General of the Philippines, but had his own governors.

== Establishment of permanent Spanish presence ==
=== Jesuit mission superiors ===
- Diego Luis de San Vitores: 16 Jun 1668 – 2 Apr 1672
- Francisco Solano: 2 Apr 1672 – 13 Jun 1672
- Francisco Ezquerra: 13 Jun 1672 – 2 Feb 1674
- Pierre Coomans: 2 Feb 1674 – 16 Jun 1674

=== Garrison commanders ===
- Juan de Santa Cruz: 16 Jun 1668 – 2 May 1672
- Juan de Santiago: 2 May 1672 – 16 Jun 1674
- Damián de Esplana: 16 Jun 1674 – 10 Jun 1676

== Governors of the Mariana Islands ==
- Francisco de Irisarri y Vivar: 10 Jun 1676 – 21 Jun 1678
- Juan Antonio de Salas: 21 Jun 1678 – 5 Jun 1680
- José de Quiroga y Losada (1st time (acting): 5 Jun 1680 – 15 Jun 1681
- Antonio de Saravia: 15 Jun 1681 – 3 Nov 1683
- Damián de Esplana (1st time, after military command): 3 Nov 1683 – Feb 1686
- José de Quiroga y Losada (2nd time): Feb 1686 – Sep 1689
- Damián de Esplana (2nd time): Sep 1689 – 16 Aug 1694
- José de Quiroga y Losada (3rd time): 16 Aug 1694 – 26 Jul 1696
- José Madrazo (interim): 26 Jul 1696 – 15 Sep 1700
- Francisco Medrano y Asiain (interim): 15 Sep 1700 – 1 Sep 1704
- Antonio Villamor y Vadillo (interim): 1 Sep 1704 – 1706
- Manuel Argüelles y Valdés (1st time; acting): 1706 – 1 Sep 1709
- Juan Antonio Pimentel: 1 Sep 1709 – 21 Nov 1720
- Luis Antonio Sánchez de Tagle: 21 Nov 1720 – 4 Apr 1725
- Juan de Ojeda (acting): 4 Apr 1725 – 28 Sep 1725
- Manuel Argüelles y Valdés (2nd time): 28 Sep 1725 – 12 Feb 1730
- Pedro Lasso de la Vega: 12 Feb 1730 – 1 Nov 1730
- Diego Félix de Balboa (interim): 1 Nov 1730 – 25 Aug 1734
- Francisco Cárdenas Pacheco: 25 Aug 1734 – 2 Apr 1740
- Miguel Fernández de Cárdenas: 2 Apr 1740 – 21 Sep 1746
- Domingo Gómez de la Sierra: 21 Sep 1746 – 8 Sep 1749
- Enrique de Olavide y Michelena (1st time): 8 Sep 1749 – 6 Nov 1756
- Andrés del Barrio y Rábago: 6 Nov 1756 – 20 Nov 1759
- José de Soroa: 20 Nov 1759 – 9 Jun 1768
- Enrique de Olavide y Michelena (2nd time): 9 Jun 1768 – 15 Sep 1771
- Mariano Tobías: 15 Sep 1771 – 15 Jun 1774
- Antonio Apodaca (interim): 15 Jun 1774 – 6 Jun 1776
- Felipe de Ceraín: 6 Jun 1776 – 21 Aug 1786
- José Arleguí y Leóz: 21 Aug 1786 – 2 Sep 1794
- Manuel Muro: 2 Sep 1794 – 12 Jan 1802
- Vicente Blanco: 12 Jan 1802 – 18 Oct 1806
- Alejandro Parreño: 18 Oct 1806 – 26 Jul 1812
- José de Medinilla y Pineda (1st time): 26 Jul 1812 – 15 Aug 1822
- José Montilla (interim): 15 Aug 1822 – 15 May 1823
- José Ganga Herrero: 15 May 1823 – 1 Aug 1826
- José de Medinilla y Pineda (2nd time): 1 Aug 1826 – 26 Sep 1831
- Francisco Ramón de Villalobos: 26 Sep 1831 – 1 Oct 1837
- José Casillas Salazar: 1 Oct 1837 – 1 Oct 1843
- Gregorio Santa Maria: 1 Oct 1843 – 4 Apr 1848
- Félix Calvo y Noriega (acting): 7 Apr 1848 – 8 Sep 1848
- Pablo Pérez: 8 Sep 1848 – 16 May 1855
- Felipe María de la Corte y Ruano Calderón: 16 May 1855 – 28 Jan 1866
- Francisco Moscoso y Lara: 28 Jan 1866 – 17 Aug 1871
- Luis de Ibáñez y García : 17 Aug 1871 – 24 Mar 1873
- Eduardo Beaumont y Calafat: 24 Mar 1873 – 14 Jan 1875
- Manuel Bravo y Barrera: 14 Jan 1875 – 15 Aug 1880
- Francisco Brochero y Parreño: 15 Aug 1880 – 18 Mar 1884
- Ángel de Pazos y Vela Hidalgo: 18 Mar 1884 – 3 Aug 1884
- Antonio Borredá y Alares (acting): 3 Aug 1884 – 1 Nov 1884
- Francisco Olive y García: 1 Nov 1884 – 22 Jul 1885
- Enrique Solano Llanderal: 22 Jul 1885 – 21 Apr 1890

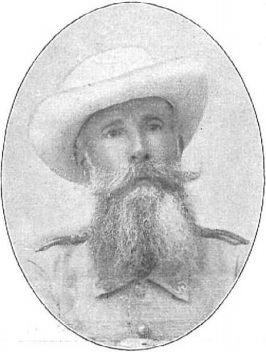
Joaquín Vara de Rey y Rubio, Governor 21 Apr 1890 – 14 Aug 1891

- Joaquín Vara de Rey y Rubio: 21 Apr 1890 – 14 Aug 1891
- Luis Santos Fontordera: 14 Aug 1891 – 23 Aug 1892
- Vicente Gómez Hernández: 23 Aug 1892 – 1 Sep 1893
- Juan Godoy del Castillo (acting): 1 Sep 1893 – 31 Oct 1893
- Emilio Galisteo y Brunenque: 31 Oct 1893 – 24 Dec 1895
- Jacobo Marina: 24 Dec 1895 – 15 Feb 1897
- Ángel Nieto y de Molina de Esquinas (acting): 15 Feb 1897 – 17 Apr 1897
- Juan Marina y Vega: 17 Apr 1897 – 21 Jun 1898

== See also ==
- List of governors of the Northern Mariana Islands
- List of governors of Guam
- List of colonial governors of Papua New Guinea#New Guinea
- Governor of the South Seas Mandate
- High Commissioner of the Trust Territory of the Pacific Islands
