= Juan Manso de Contreras =

Governor of New Mexico (1656-1659)

17th Spanish Governor of New Mexico
- In office 1656–1659
- Preceded by: Juan de Samaniego y Xaca
- Succeeded by: Bernardo López de Mendizábal

Personal details
- Born: Villa de Loarca, Consejo de Valdes, in Oviedo (Asturias, Spain)
- Died: 1671 unknown
- Profession: Governor of New Mexico and Alguacil Mayor

Juan Manso de Contreras (c.1628 – 1671) was the Spanish governor of New Mexico between 1656 and 1659. In 1662 on orders from the Inquisition, he arrested his successor as governor, Bernardo López de Mendizabal, and escorted him to Mexico City for trial. He was also a businessman who organized and led wagon trains carrying supplies from Mexico City and Parral, Chihuahua to New Mexico.

== Early life ==
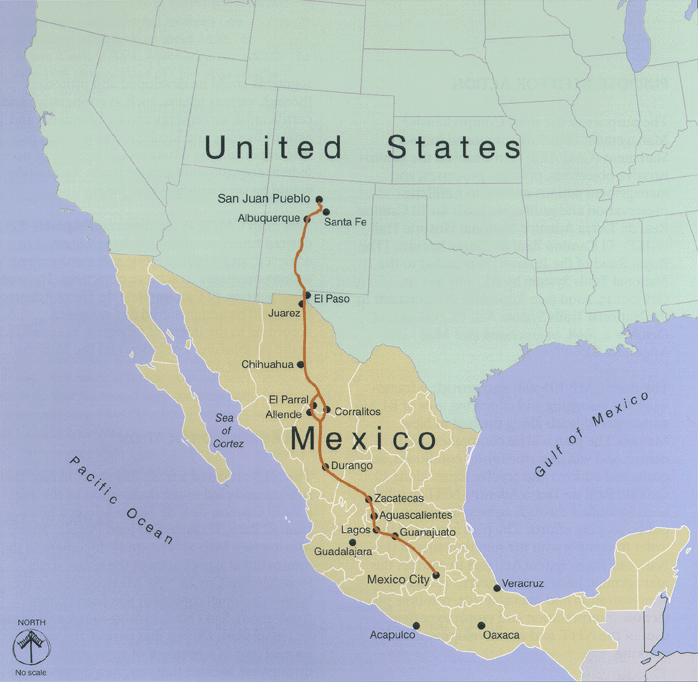
Manso traversed the 1,600 miles (2,600 km) Camino Real de Tierra Adentro from Mexico City to New Mexico many times.

Juan Manso de Contreras was born about 1628 in Luarca, Consejo de Valdes, in Oviedo (Asturias, Spain). Juan Manso probably arrived with his nephew Pedro Manso de Valdez in New Spain between 1648 and 1652. By 1652 or 1653 he was assisting his brother, Franciscan priest, Tomás Manso, with the supply train caravans which left Mexico every three years with goods for the Franciscan missions in New Mexico. He married Petronila Ponce de León in Mexico City in spring 1654. In 1656 he was appointed governor of New Mexico. He was only about 28 years old. His appointment was probably influenced by his brother, Tomás.

== Governor of new Mexico ==
There is little documentation about Manso's term as governor from 1656 to 1659. Historian France V. Scholes summed up his administration: "Manso's term as governor was characterized by the usual routine of provincial business and occasional campaigns against the Apaches. Like his predecessors he engaged in trading operations and other business deals for the purpose of deriving profit from his term in office. His relations with the clergy were apparently friendly, and he gave active assistance in the preliminary attempts to found a mission in the El Paso area", perhaps his most important accomplishment. Manso also approved a Franciscan request (later cancelled) to move the population of one pueblo of the Piro people to another pueblo to concentrate the population for administrative ease, a process called reductions which was practiced throughout the Spanish Empire.

Since its creation as a Spanish colony in 1598, New Mexico had been characterized by strife and competition between the Fransciscan missionaries (of whom there were 46 in 1656) and the encomenderos (large land owners with rights to exploit the indigenous population of the Pueblo people). Mansos' familial ties moderated the competition between the two. The Pueblos numbered more than 16,000 and the Spaniards, mestizos, and their American Indian slaves little more than 2,000. The governor's military force was "fifty men [comprised] of the dregs of the earth, mestizos, mulattoes, and foreigners". Moreover there was little ready wealth to be had, except for the slave trade in Indians and a few products such as bison skins.

A scandal marred his administration. He allegedly fathered a child with Margarita Marques, wife of an important citizen of New Mexico. A Franciscan priest helped him conceal the birth and to send the baby to Mexico City to be raised there. This story was circulated widely in the colony by Manso's enemies. Possibly because of the scandal the priest, Miguel Sacristán, hanged himself in 1661.

In summer 1659, Bernardo López de Mendizábal arrived in New Mexico to replace Manso as governor. As customary, Manso remained in New Mexico to review his term of office with the new governor. Such a review frequently resulted in bribes from the outgoing governor to the new governor to attain approval of the outgoing governor's actions. During the review, Manso and López had a disagreement concerning the ownership of 18 Apache slaves. They had been captured and enslaved during Manso's administration, but López claimed he had purchased them. Instead of reaching an agreement, López imprisoned Manso. He soon escaped and fled to Mexico City where he lodged a complaint against López with the tribunal of the Inquisition.

Manso remained in Mexico City until 1661. In that year, he traveled to New Mexico to arrest Governor López de Mendizabal in accordance with an order from the Inquisition. He arrested López and in October 1662 left New Mexico and escorted him to Mexico City for trial. Manso then moved to Parral in New Vizcaya, where he organized supply caravans from Mexico City to Parral and onward to New Mexico. The Franciscans in New Mexico began an investigation of him in 1668, suspecting him of profiting at their expense.

== Second marriage and death ==
On 25 September 1663 Manso married his second wife, Francisca Esquerra de Rosas y Romo in Parral where he had taken up residence. He died on November 27, 1671 from a fall (probably from a horse) in Queretaro enroute from Mexico City to Parral. His wife, Francisca, was his sole heir. She remarried and died in Parral and was buried on January 19, 1676.
