= Francisco Martínez de Baeza =

8th Spanish Governor of New Mexico
- In office November 1634 – 18 April 1637
- Preceded by: Francisco de la Mora Ceballos
- Succeeded by: Luis de Rosas

Personal details
- Born: unknown probably in Seville (Spain)
- Died: unknown unknown
- Profession: political

Francisco Martínez de Baeza was the colonial governor of New Mexico from November 1634 to 18 April 1637. He was heavily criticized for rejecting the participation of Franciscan missions in the territory, for impeding the conversion of indigenous people to Christianity, and for exploiting the labor of these people.

== Biography ==
Although the time and place of his birth are unknown, it is believed that he was born in Seville, Spain.

He was appointed governor of Spain's New Mexico colony and installed in that office in late November 1634, succeeding Francisco de la Mora y Ceballos. He used the settlers and, especially, the native population as labor, making this activity his main function.

Once in power, he organized a series of commercial companies, paying little attention to his duties as governor in the province, such as that of maintaining peace between settlers and Native Americans. Martínez de Baeza forced the Amerindians to gather pine nuts and trade in manufactured goods (specifically in furs, fabrics, and cotton blankets), which were manufactured by Native Americans (including Puebloans) in his workshops in Santa Fe. Many of these Native Americans (except the Pueblos) were prisoners of enemy tribes captured by the Spaniards. The lack of cotton forced many of the inhabitants of some native villages to negotiate with the people of other native villages to get the cotton needed to meet the demand. Workers charged very little for their production. The Native Americans had to work every day, including even on holidays. At the end of 1636, the governor already had a great amount of products to sell, so he was able to send nine wagons loaded with his production to the commercial fairs of Southern New Spain, in order to obtain a good economic benefit.

Martínez de Baeza took little interest in the Franciscan missions, making it difficult for them to convert indigenous people to Christianity. Nor did he pay attention to Native American attacks against the missionaries, and as a result he was denounced by the Franciscans. On 24 September 1636, a Franciscan custodian, Fray Cristóbal de Quirós, explained to Martínez de Baeza his decision to include several Catholic missions in Zuni lands and asked for escorts to accompany and defend the missionaries from possible external attacks. However, Martínez de Baeza rejected the demand, under the pretext that Quirós was not asking respectfully. Later, the custodian explained to him that the necessary encomiendas and tributes of the Zuni lands had already been approved to pay for the escorts. However, Baeza asked Quirós to show him some evidence so he would know what he was saying was true, because he knew that the Franciscans had decided that conversion to Christianity should to be done in the apostolic way, by persuasion, and never using military force.

In November 1636, De Quirós wrote numerous letters to the Viceroy, in which he criticized Baeza. Also Fray Antonio de Ibargaray, sent some critical letters against him. Meanwhile, Martínez de Baeza wrote a series of reports containing false information about certain individuals of the clergy in order to discredit them in the eyes of the viceroy.

His governorship ended on 18 April 1637, leaving the colony in hands of Luis de Rosas.

== Last years ==
On 11 December 1639, in Mexico City, Martínez de Baeza signed his last testament, in which he handed over fifty pesos to the "Cofradía del Santísimo Sacramento" (Brotherhood of the Holy Sacrament) of the parish of San Marcos in Seville, and other money to cover any debts that he apparently had with merchants from that city.
