= List of Spanish governors of New Mexico =

Spanish Governor of New Mexico
- Flag of the Viceroyalty of New Spain
- Residence: Santa Fe
- Appointer: King of Spain
- Formation: November 1598; 427 years ago
- First holder: Juan de Oñate
- Final holder: Facundo Melgares
- Abolished: January 1822; 204 years ago
- Succession: List of Mexican governors of New Mexico

Map of the province of Nuevo México in 1824

Spanish Governors of New Mexico were the political chief executives of the province of Santa Fe de Nuevo México (New Mexico) between 1598, when it was established by an expedition by Juan de Oñate, and 1822, following Mexico's declaration of independence. New Mexico became a territory of the United States beginning in 1846, and a state in 1912.

== History ==
In 1598, Juan de Oñate pioneered 'The Royal Road of the Interior Land', or El Camino Real de Tierra Adentro, between Mexico City and the Tewa village of 'Ohkay Owingeh', or San Juan Pueblo, founding the Nuevo México Province under the authority of Philip II. He also founded the settlement (a Spanish pueblo) of San Juan on the Rio Grande near the Native American Pueblo. In 1610, Pedro de Peralta, then governor, established the settlement of Santa Fe in the region of the Sangre de Cristo Mountains on the Rio Grande. Missions were established for conversions and agricultural industry under the authority of the governor. The territory's Puebloan peoples resented the Spaniards denigration and prohibition of their traditional religion, and their encomienda system's forced labor. In 1680, the Pueblo Revolt occurred, and a final resolution included additional protections from Spanish efforts to eradicate their culture and religion, the issuing of substantial communal land grants to each Pueblo, and a public defender of their rights and for their legal cases in Spanish courts.

In January 1822, the last Governor under the Spanish regime, Facundo Melgares, lost the title of governor and was now called géfe político (political chief) and géfe militar (military chief). Subsequently, Melgares became the first Mexican Governor of New Mexico, serving until July 5, 1822 when he was succeeded by Francisco Xavier Chavez, though he would hold office for just five months.

== Governors ==
The following is a list of governors of the Province of New Mexico under the Viceroyalty of New Spain:

=== 1st stage (1598–1680) ===
The political chiefs (géfe políticos) or governors were:

Name	Start	End	Notes
Juan de Oñate	1598	1608	Conquistador, explorer and administrator of New Spain. Son of explorer and conquistador Cristóbal de Oñate. Initiated NM Indian slaving through encomienda system. Allowed colonists to seize "orphaned" Native children, including from their parents.
Bernardino de Ceballos	1608	1610	
Pedro de Peralta	1610	1613	
Bernardino de Ceballos (2nd term)	1613	1618	
Juan Álvarez de Eulate	1618	1625	
Felipe de Sotelo Osorio	1625	1630	Employed Indians to capture Indians from competing tribes for slave trade in New Mexico.
Francisco Manuel de Silva Nieto	1630	1632	
Francisco de la Mora Ceballos	1632	1635	
Francisco Martínez de Baeza	1635	1637	
Luis de Rosas	1637	spring 1641	Exploited Indian slaves in sweatshop manufacturing of textiles to export to Mexico. Imprisoned and killed when his government ended
Juan Flores de Sierra y Valdés	Spring 1641	Autumn 1641	Died in office
Francisco Gomes	1641	1642	Acting
Alonso de Pacheco y Herédia	1643	1643	
Fernando de Argüello	1644	1647	
Luis de Guzmán y Figueroa	1647	1649	
Hernando de Ugarte y la Concha	1649	1652	
Juan de Samaniego y Xaca	1652	1656	
Juan Manso de Contreras	1656	1659	Issued a "death sentence against the entire Apache nation and others of the same ilk," but allowed Spanish settlers to hold captured Indians as indentured servants.
Bernardo López de Mendizábal	1659	1660	Collected Indians as slaves and stole their livestock, clothing, salt, sleeping mats, and other items to give to authorities in Mexico.
Diego Dionisio de Peñalosa Briceño y Berdugo	1661	1664	Had a dispute with Franciscan missionary Alonso de Posada and was prosecuted by the Inquisition.
Tomé Dominguez de Mendoza	1664	1664	
Juan Durán de Miranda	1664	1665	
Fernando de Villanueva	1665	1668	
Juan de Medrano y Mesía	1668	1671	
Juan Durán de Miranda (2nd term)	1671	1675	
Juan Francisco Treviño	1675	1679	His policies against the Pueblo Indians gave rise to their revolt.

=== 2nd stage: Governors and Pueblo leaders during the revolt ===
From 1680 until 1692, the Puebloans revolted against Spanish domination and lived under their own rulers. The political chiefs or governors and Pueblo leaders were:

Spanish governors	Start	End	Notes
Antonio de Otermin	1679	1680	Titular governor until 1683
Domingo Gironza Petriz Cruzate	1683	1686	
Pedro Reneros de Posada	1686	1689	
Domingo Gironza Petriz Cruzate (2nd term)	1689	1691	
Pueblo leaders	Start	End	Notes
Popé	1680	1685	
Luis Tupatu	1685	1692	

=== 3rd stage (1688–1822) ===
The political chiefs (géfe políticos) or governors were:

Name	Start	End	Notes
Diego de Vargas	1688 (titular); 1691 (effective)	1691 (titular); 1697 (effective)	He placated the Pueblo revolt through a peace treaty with them.
Pedro Rodríguez Cubero	1697	1703	
Diego de Vargas (2nd term)	1703	1704	
Juan Páez Hurtado	1704	1705	
Francisco Cuervo y Valdés	June 1705	August 1707	Provisional
Jose Chacón Medina Salazar y Villaseñor	1707	1712	
Juan Ignacio Flores Mogollon	1712	1715	
Felix Martínez de Torrelaguna	1715	1716	Acting
Antonio Valverde y Cosío	1716	1716	Acting
Juan Páez Hurtado (2nd term)	1716	1717	Acting
Antonio Valverde y Cosío (2nd term)	1718	1721	Interim
Juan Estrada de Austria	1721	1723	
Juan Domingo de Bustamante	1723	1731	
Gervasio Cruzat y Gongora	1731	1736	
Enrique de Olavide y Michelena	1736	1738	
Gaspar Domingo de Mendoza	1739	1743	
Joaquín Codallos	1743	1749	
Tomás Vélez Cachupín	1749	1754	
Francisco Antonio Marín del Valle	1754	1760	
Mateo Antonio de Mendoza	1760	1760	Acting
Manuel de Portillo y Urrisola	May 10, 1760	1762	
Tomás Vélez Cachupín (2nd term)	1762	1767	
Pedro Fermín de Mendinueta	1767	1777	
Francisco Trevre	1777	1777	Acting
Juan Bautista de Anza	1778	1788	
Fernando de la Concha	1789	1794	
Fernando Chacón	1794	1804	
Joaquín del Real Alencaster	1804	1807	
Alberto Maynez	1807	1808	
José Manrique	1808	1814	
Alberto Maynez (2nd term)	1814	1816	
Pedro María de Allande	1816	1818	
Facundo Melgares	1818	1822	

== See also ==
- History of New Mexico
  - List of Mexican governors of New Mexico (1822–1846)
  - List of U.S. governors of New Mexico (1846–present)

== Sources ==
- Espinosa, José Manuel (1988). The Pueblo Indian Revolt of 1696 and the Franciscan Missions in New Mexico: Letters of the Missionaries and Related Documents. University of Oklahoma Press. ISBN 9780806123653.
- "New Mexico Governors". State of New Mexico – Commission of Public Records ~ State Records Center and Archives. Archived from the original on 2012-02-27.
- Reséndez, Andrés (2016). The Other Slavery: the uncovered story of Indian enslavement in America. New York: Houghton Mifflin. ISBN 978-0-547-64098-3. OCLC 913924416.
- Twitchell, Ralph Emerson (2007-05-30). Old Santa Fe. Sunstone Press. ISBN 978-0-86534-574-4.
