= Gaspar Domingo de Mendoza =

45th Spanish Governor of New Mexico
- In office 1739–1743
- Preceded by: Enrique de Olivade y Michelena
- Succeeded by: Joaquín Codallos

Personal details
- Born: Spain
- Spouse: María Ferreras de la Torre
- Profession: Spanish military leader and governor of colonial New Mexico

Gaspar Domingo de Mendoza y Delgado was a Spanish soldier in the War of the Spanish Succession. He later served as the Spanish colonial governor of Santa Fe de Nuevo México province (present day New Mexico) from 1739 to 1743, located in the northern Viceroyalty of New Spain (colonial Mexico and Central America).

== Career ==
=== Military service ===
Mendoza was a member of the Royal Service of the Regimiento de Guardias de Infantería Española (Spanish Guards Regiment Infantry). In 1708, he became a lieutenant colonel of the infantry. He served as a soldier, Cabo de esquadra, and Sergeant.

Mendoza fought in the War of the Spanish Succession of the early 18th century.
He fought in the following battles: the Battle of La Gudina (7 May 1709), the Battle of Zaragoza (20 August 1710), the siege and advance on Viruega, the Battle of Villaviciosa (10 December 1710), the sieges in the Spanish municipalities of Castellón, Cardona, Lerida and Tortosa, the Siege of Barcelona (1713–1714), the blockade of Olivenza, the capture of Balaguer (in Catalonia), the detachment of Arenes, and the siege and capture of Estadilla (in the province of Huesca, Aragon, Spain). He also participated in the capture of Barcelona and all the operations involved in the campaign to Sardinia and Sicily, as well as in the capture of the Castillo de Palermo, the sieges and captures of Messina and Melazo, and the conquest of Oran and its subsequent restoration. He also participated in the reunions held in the Spanish municipalities Almenara, Castellón and Peñalba.

In 1735, Rodrigo was appointed Captain of the armed forces and Ayudante mayor of the town square of Ciudad Rodrigo (in Province of Salamanca) in Spain. On 12 May 1737, King Philip V of Spain appointed Mendoza Governor of New Mexico, although he did not occupy the government of the province (at that time New Mexico was a province) until January 1739.

=== Governor of colonial New Mexico ===
Mendoza traveled to the Viceroyalty of New Spain (colonial México) with his wife and children, plus a maid and three servants (one woman and two man).

Shortly after he arrived in the province of Santa Fe de Nuevo México in 1739 to become governor, a small group of armed Frenchmen visited Santa Fe after having left Taos and the Jicarilla territory.

In 1741, Mendoza issued laws to protect and defend Amerindian women and children in Taos. He issued a law to punish all men who wounded, killed or mistreated "infidel" woman and boys, fining them with 300 silver pesos and six years in exile. However, this law was impossible to carry out, especially due to the distance between the capital at Santa Fe and Taos. During Mendoza's administration, many children were captured, especially children who belonged to the Navajo, Utes, Comanche and Apache peoples.

Later, a group of seven Comanches traveled to Taos Pueblo to trade tobacco and they explained to Mendoza that their people would visit the valley when the snows abandoned the mountains. However, they also said them the French armed them with muskets and that later they had traveled to some unknown direction beyond their lands (colonial New France). However, they indicated also that two French traders would go to visit New Mexico in the spring. When the news reached to Mendoza, he decided to establish a presidio (fort) in the north to protect the population of Taos from the possible French invasion, and did so in the Jicarilla Apache's abandoned settlement. The presidio used many shelters that had been built in the place.

Despite this (and for some reason), when the French traders visited Santa Fe, Mendoza accepted them and gave them a map showing the Spanish settlements in Santa Fe de Nuevo México. Later, the traders brought the map back to the French Louisiana colony in New France, where they were based, causing the repentance of Mendoza for having given them the map.

The trade with the French traders allowed the Spanish obtain French guns.

Mendoza was replaced by Joaquín Codallos y Rabal as colonial governor of Santa Fe de Nuevo México province in 1743.

== Personal life ==
Mendoza married María Ferreras de la Torre. They had three children — Francisca Micaela (born 1731), María Manuela (born 1733) and Hermenegildo (born 1736).

Having left the charge of governor in 1743, Mendoza apparently lived in Santa Fe de Nuevo Mexico for a while longer. One of his daughters, Francisca Micaela, around 14 years old at that time, married Joaquín Codallos y Rabal after he assumed the governor office of the province.

== See also ==
- List of Spanish governors of New Mexico
- Colonial New Mexico
