= Pedro Fermín de Mendinueta =

Spanish colonial governor of Santa Fe de Nuevo México

Pedro Fermín de Mendinueta y Garro
- Escudo de armas de Pedro Fermín de Mendinueta

53rd Spanish Governor of New Mexico
- In office 1767–1777
- Preceded by: Tomás Vélez Cachupín
- Succeeded by: Francisco Trevre

Personal details
- Born: 8 July 1725 Elizondo, Navarra
- Died: 18 January 1806 (aged 80) Elizondo, Navarra
- Profession: Soldier and governor of colonial New Mexico
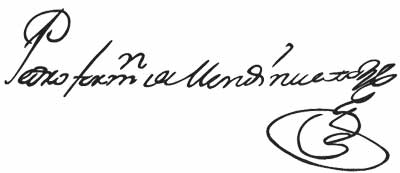
- Signature

Field Marshal Pedro Fermín de Mendinueta y Garro, Knight of the Order of Santiago, served as the Spanish colonial governor of Santa Fe de Nuevo México province (present day New Mexico) from 1767 to 1777, located in the northern Viceroyalty of New Spain (colonial México). He was born in Elizondo (Navarra) to Bartolomé de Mendinueta y Echenique and Ana Catalina de Garro y Micheltorena. He belonged to a network of prominent aristocratic families, specially from the Baztan Valley, which began to gain significant influence at the start of the Spanish Bourbon dynasty in the 18th century: such as the Arizcun, Pontejos, Goyeneche, Valdeolmos families.

He saved the public buildings of Santa Fe, including the governor's house, when the city was flooded. His government paid great attention to the regulation and punishment of crimes in New Mexico, which were especially abundant in Albuquerque and Santa Fe. He also had to fight the Comanches, who frequently attacked the population of northern New Mexico. He tried to make a peace treaty with them, but it failed when the Comanches disobeyed the treaty, and he established a better defense system in New Mexico.

== Governor of colonial New Mexico ==
=== Justice issues ===
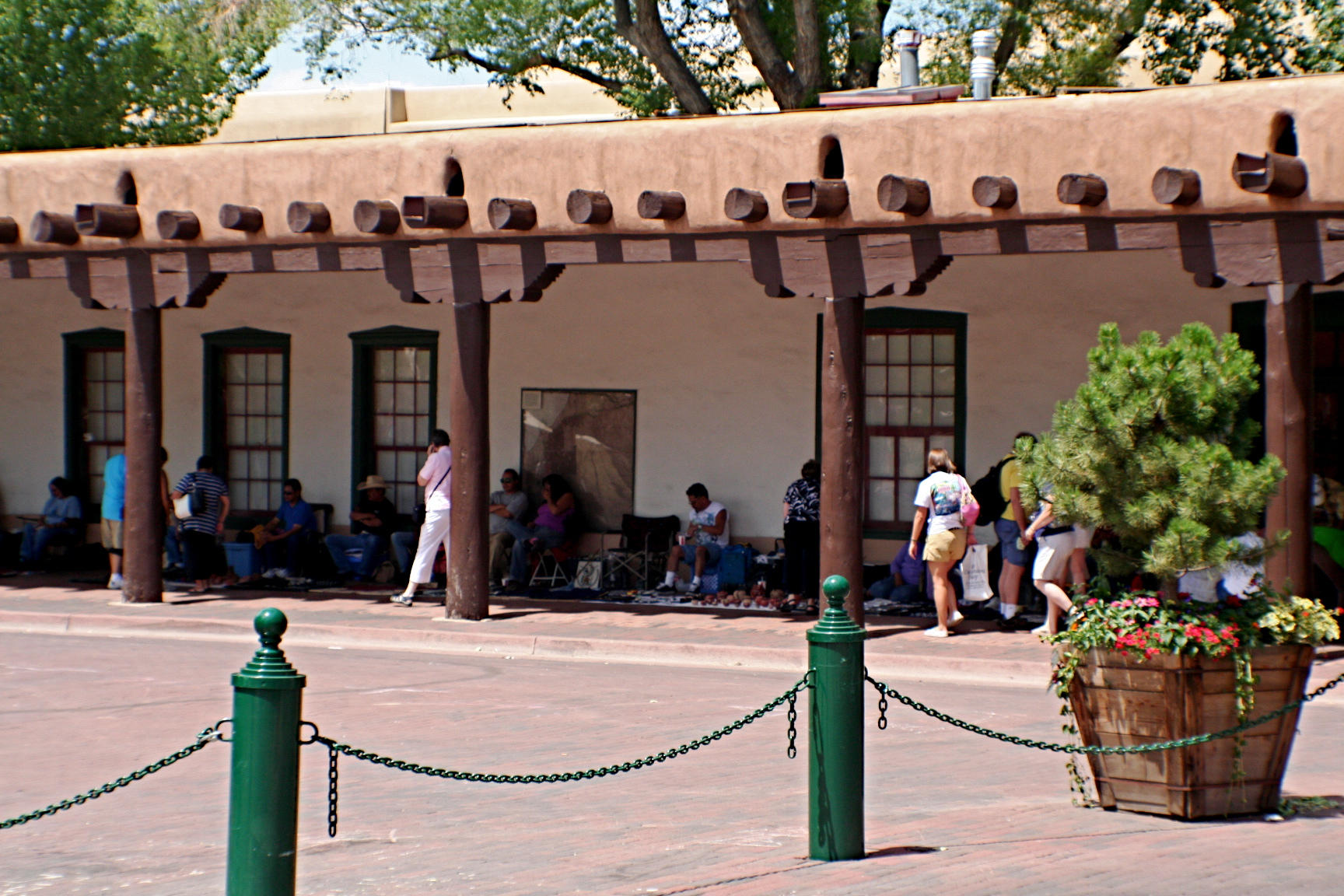
The Palace of the Governors.

Mendinueta became governor and captain-general of Santa Fe de Nuevo México province in 1767.

In October 1767, the rising Santa Fe River caused a flood in the town. Mendinueta ordered the Nuevomexicanos to build retaining walls between the riverbed and the pueblo to protect public buildings. Afterwards, the Palace of the Governors remained unharmed in subsequent floods.

In November 1767, Mendinueta established a law to regulate the hardest crimes. In addition, In early 1768 Mendinueta ordered Francisco Trebol Navarro (alcalde mayor of the city of Albuquerque) and Felipe Tafoya (alcalde mayor of Santa Fe) to punish the crimes that happened in their cities (gambling, concubinage, theft, prostitution, etc.) or else be fired. Indeed, Mendinueta thought that Albuquerque was one of the most dangerous places in New Mexico. In January 1768, Mendinueta was named a captain, so he led the Spanish troops that would participate in a military campaign against indigenous peoples. However, Mendinueta did not support all the requests from the residents of New Mexico. For example, he refused the citizens' request to replace Trebol as mayor of Albuquerque because they felt Trebol was incompetent. Indeed, during his administration, the crime rate had increased in Albuquerque.

Mendinueta normally worked in civil cases. In the rural society of New Mexico, most of the cases were related to land and livestock. Many of the cases that the governor had to face were ones in which the defendants were Spanish persons who tried to incite the natives to, for example, attack other indigenous villages, something intolerable to Mendinueta and which led hid to punish the defendants.

=== Troubles with the Comanches ===
In the late 1760s, the Comanches traveled to the Sangre de Cristo Mountains, north of Taos, where, together with the Utes, they attacked the San Luis Valley, the Rio Grande area, and Santa Fe. To defend those lands, Mendinueta ordered build the Cerro de San Antonio in a zone located in the north of Ojo Caliente, in May 1768. The new garrison consisted of fifty men. However, they were not successful.

Therefore, Mendinueta established several new measures to defend the population of New Mexico from the Comanche attacks. He sent the order to settle all Spanish people of Taos in the most populated places of the province so that they could repel the attacks of the Comanches. According to him, the Spanish should live in most populated regions rather that in individual farms, as did the Pueblo Amerindians, because that easied the defense of the place. This proposal faced against the traditional views that the Spanish and criollo residents in New Mexico had about their settlements. In addition, the governor said the Amerindians should leave their villages and settle in the cities inhabited by Spaniards, "for defensive purposes", where the Spaniards could also teach them the Spanish customs. However, according to Nicolas de Lafona, Santa Fe (which maintained the largest Spanish population, as it was one of the most important cities of the province), was attacked during the whole colonial period.

Mendinueta also conscripted the people of Spanish origin and the Christianized Amerindians to the New Mexican troops through a law that required the Spanish should exercise military service for eighteen days, regardless of where they lived. Each Spaniard of New Mexico was required to join the army, taking a horse and carrying any weapon they had (either a spear, pike, or any other).

However, the Spanish troops were always defeated by the Comanches. In addition, Madinueta could not stage a major military campaign against the Comanches and they continued to attack almost every day northern of the province. Therefore, he ended up coming to terms with the Comanches to stop their attacks, signing a treaty with them in February 1771 in Taos. The treaty forbade Spaniards from moving or traveling into Comanche territory if they didn't attack the Rio Grande Valley again. The treaty was followed by good trade relations between the two groups. The peace treaty favored Mendinuela's allowing the Comanches to visit the Taos fair, where their presences had been prohibited in 1761 due to conflicts they had with the Spaniards. However, the Comanches didn't stop attacking New Mexico, so the treaty was broken shortly after its approval. However, Oakah L. Jones notes that the Comanches continuously attacked the Spanish and criollos throughout the 1770s.

=== Improvements in the defense of New Mexico ===
In 1772, following a visit to New Mexico by the Viceroy of New Spain Cayetano Pignatelli in the 1760s, Mendinueta developed a "line of presidios", which stretched from the Gulf of California to Texas, passing through Arizona and New Mexico, to incorporate better defenses in those territories. However, the new presidios did not affect New Mexico significantly, because the province already had several important presidios among which the one in Santa Fe, New Mexico's capital, stood out, so New Mexico was already more or less defended. A civilian militia was built at El Paso del Norte and the troops of this presidio were placed at Carrizal.

In 1776, in order to enhance the political organization and protection in northern New Spain, the Spanish Crown required a reorganization of all of the parts of the viceroyalty of New Spain, leading to a broad new policy for controlling the indigenous people in this province. A new administration subdivision named Provincias Internas (internal provinces) was established, to provide more autonomy for the frontier provinces including Santa Fe de Nuevo México and Alta California. Thus, New Mexico began to be "more and more integrated into New Spain".

Later in 1776, the governor of New Mexico lost his position as colonial governor, and was officially recognized only as a military officer.

== Ancestry ==
Pedro de Mendinueta
Miguel de Mendinueta y Mendiondo
Catalina de Mendiondo y Peroscorena
Sebastián de Mendinueta y Arizcun
Joanes de Arizcun y Meaca
María Sotil de Arizcun y Arraioz
María Arraioz
Bartolomé de Mendinueta y Echenique
Juan de Echenique
Simón de Echenique y Asco
Ana de Asco
Margarita de Echenique y Borda
Martín de Borda
María de Borda y Arrechea
María de Arrechea
Pedro Fermín de Mendinueta
Juan de Garro
Juan Ángel de Garro y Arizcun
Martín de Arizcun y Arotzarena
Graciana de Arizcun y Jaimerena
Marijuan de Jaimerena
Ana Catalina de Garro y Micheltorena
Juan de Micheltorena
Juanot de Micheltorena
María de Garchitorena
María de Micheltorena Elizalde
Juan de Elizalde
Catalina de Elizalde
María de Elizondo Echevarría

== See also ==
- Colonial New Mexico
- List of Spanish governors of New Mexico
