= Bernardo de Miera y Pacheco =

Spanish cartographer

- Born: Bernardo de Miera y Pacheco; 4 August 1713; Valle de Carriedo of Cantabria, Spain
- Died: April 1785 (aged 71); Santa Fe, New Mexico
- Occupation: cartographer
- Children: 2 sons

Signature
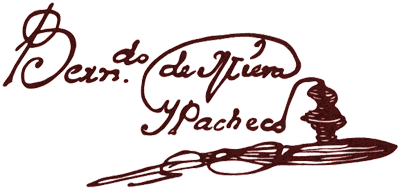

Bernardo de Miera y Pacheco (4 August 1713 – 4 or 11 April 1785) was "perhaps the most prolific and important cartographer of New Spain" as well as an artist, particularly as a Santero (wood-carver of religious images). He has been called a polymath, being "proficient in astronomy, cartography, mathematics, geography, geology, geometry, military tactics, commerce, husbandry, oenology, metallurgy, languages, iconology, iconography, liturgy, painting, sculpture and drawing."

== Biography ==
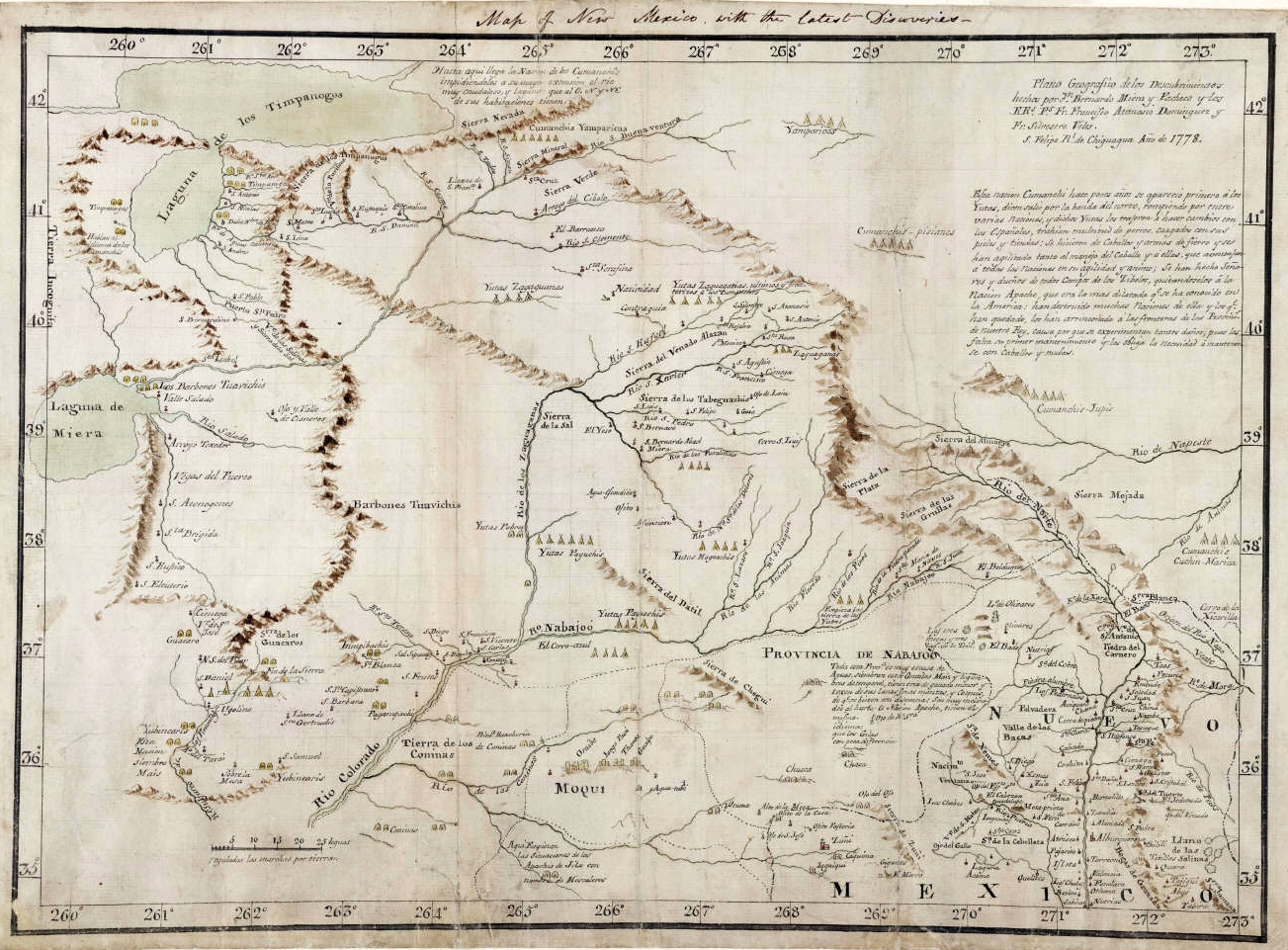
Map of north-western New Mexico by Bernando de Miera y Pacheco, 1778.

Miera was born in the Valle de Carriedo of Cantabria, Spain. The son of a captain of the Cantabrian Cavalry, he was trained as a military engineer.

Like many others, he emigrated to New Spain (in North and Central America). On 20 May 1741, he married Maria Estefania Domínguez de Mendoza in Chihuahua. They had two sons, Anacléto (Cléto) and Manuel. In 1743, the family settled in El Paso.

A man of many talents, he was variously a merchant, a debt collector, a rancher and a military officer. In the latter capacity, he served in five military campaigns. In 1747, Captain Miera led a military detachment accompanying Padre Juan Menchero on the latter's attempt to convert the Navajo and resettle them around Mount Taylor (formerly Ceboletta).

Though Menchero was unsuccessful, Miera produced the first map of the territory they traversed. In 1749, he mapped the Rio Grande from El Paso downstream to its junction with the Rio Conchos.

He was also a painter and carver. Some of his works survive in churches and museums; the Church of Cristo Rey in Santa Fe has "his masterpiece, the Castrense altar screen".

In 1754 or 1756, he moved his family to Santa Fe. He was appointed alcalde of the pueblos of Pecos and Galisteo and participated in three campaigns against the Comanches.

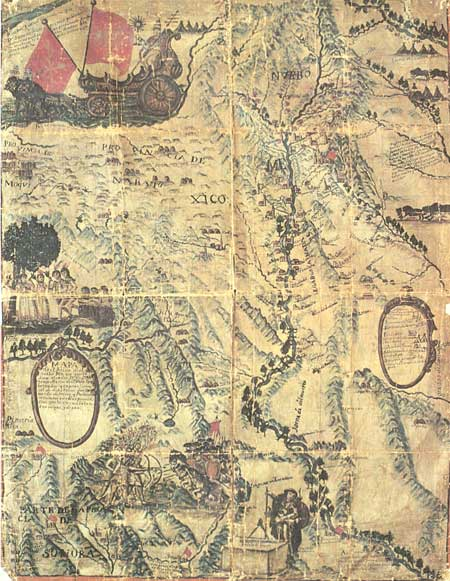
Map of New Mexico, 1760, drawn by Miera y Pacheco and dedicated to Marín del Valle

When the Viceroy of New Spain ordered his northern governors to produce maps of their territories, Francisco Antonio Marín del Valle, Governor and Captain General of New Mexico, turned to Miera. They went out into the field on this endeavor from late June to 1 December 1757. The influential map was completed by April 1758. Miera went on to make at least two other maps for Marín.

Miera was granted a league of land (about 4428 acres or 1792 hectares) around Ceboletta, which was subsequently reduced to 4107 acres or 1662 hectares.

He also served as cartographer for the 1776 Domínguez–Escalante expedition. Miera was often at odds with the other leaders of the group, and was also frequently ill. The expedition failed in its goal of finding a route north to Monterey, but Miera produced maps that were invaluable to subsequent explorers.

In 1779, Miera accompanied Governor of New Mexico Juan Bautista de Anza on a punitive expedition against the Comanches, who had been raiding Taos. As a result, he drew perhaps his last map, covering an area centered on the Rio Grande from Santa Fe up to the Arkansas River.

On 4 or 11 April 1785, Bernardo de Miera y Pacheco died in Santa Fe. His wife, Estefania, had died less than a year and a half earlier, also in Santa Fe.

== Legacy ==
His maps were examined by Alexander von Humboldt in 1803 to help prepare his own maps. Humboldt in turn shared the information with American President Thomas Jefferson a year later, and Miera's work was copied by American mapmakers. The original of his 1758 map disappeared some time after 1930 in Mexico City, but a copy was made in the 1970s from photographs of it.

== Bibliography ==
- Diaz, Josef, ed. (2013). The Art & Legacy of Bernardo Miera y Pacheco: New Spain's Explorer, Cartographer, and Artist. Museum of New Mexico Press. ISBN 9780890135853.
- Kessell, John L. (2013). Miera y Pacheco: A Renaissance Spaniard in Eighteenth-Century New Mexico. University of Oklahoma Press. ISBN 9780806143774.
