= Juan de Samaniego y Xaca =

Former governor of New Mexico

16th Spanish Governor of New Mexico
- In office 1653–1656
- Preceded by: Hernando de Ugarte y la Concha
- Succeeded by: Juan Manso de Contreras

Personal details
- Born: unknown Estella, Navarra (Spain)
- Died: unknown unknown
- Profession: Military and Governor of New Mexico

Juan de Samaniego y Díez de Ulzurrun Xaca y Roncal, better known as Juan de Samaniego y Jaca, was a prominent Spanish military officer who served as Governor of New Mexico between 1653 and 1656. He initiated several expeditions to liberate native people from Amerindians who attacked, kidnapped and took those native people as prisoners.

== Biography ==
Juan de Samaniego y Díez de Ulzurrun Xaca y Roncal was born in Estella, Navarra (Spain). He was a son of Lorenzo de Samaniego y Jaca and Catalina Díez de Ulzurrun y Roncal. Eventually, Juan de Samaniego earned the title of nobleman after verifying the notability of his four grandparents (his paternal grandparents were Martín de Samaniego and Inés de Jaca, while his maternal grandparents were Martín Díez de Ulzurrun y Margarita Roncal). So, he joined the Order of San Juan de Jerusalén in 1637.

He joined the Spanish Army in his youth. There, he had a distinguished military career, joining the Knights Hospitaller, a leading religious-military order.

In 1653, Xaca was chosen as governor of Santa Fe de Nuevo México by the Viceroy Francisco Fernández de la Cueva.

During his administration in New Mexico, Franciscans filed 17 charges against Samaniego, and he had trouble with some Amerindian people, who attacked and kidnapped people in New Mexico. In time, the Apaches attacked the Jumano village, kidnapping twenty-seven women and local children. To rescue them, Samaniego sent a troop led by Juan Domínguez de Mendoza to the Apache village. The expedition was successful and the Apaches were punished.

The following year, Navajos raided Jemez Pueblo. The Navajo killed nineteen people and took another thirty-five. Samaniego sent several troops against them. The Spaniards, led again by Dominguez de Mendoza, entered the Navajo village while they celebrated a ceremonial, and there they abducted 211 people and killed several more. Then, the Spanish militaries freed the people kidnapped by the Navajos. This caused Samaniego to be threatened by Friar Antonio de Ibargary, because Samaniego had punished Native Americans without consulting the priests.

Later, in 1654, Samaniego organized an exploratory expedition to the Nueces River and chose Diego de Guadalajara Bernardo de Quirós as its leader.

Juan de Samaniego y Jaca was replaced by Juan Manso de Contreras in 1656 in the New Mexico government. Samaniego settled in Parral, Chihuahua (in modern Mexico) where he became an attorney to Valerio Cortés del Rey, his former financial backer during his politic administration in New Mexico.
