= Tomás Vélez Cachupín =

Spanish colonial governor of Nuevo México (c.1730–c.1770)

47th Spanish Governor of New Mexico
- In office 1749–1754
- Preceded by: Joaquín Codallos
- Succeeded by: Francisco Antonio Marín del Valle

52nd Spanish Governor of New Mexico
- In office 1762–1767
- Preceded by: Manuel Portilla Urrisola
- Succeeded by: Pedro Fermín de Mendinueta

Personal details
- Born: c. 1730
- Died: c. 1770 (aged c. 40)
- Profession: Judge and governor of colonial New Mexico
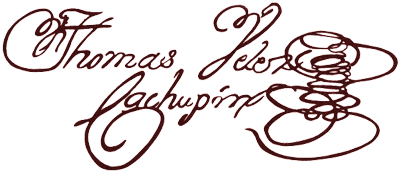
- Signature

Tomás Vélez Cachupín (c. 1730 – c. 1770) was a colonial judge and the Spanish colonial governor of Santa Fe de Nuevo México province (present-day New Mexico), located in the northern Viceroyalty of New Spain (colonial México), from 1749 to 1754 and 1762 to 1767. During his rule, Vélez Cachupín achieved peace between Spaniards and the Amerindian peoples of New Mexico, especially the Comanches. He also protected the right to the possession of lands by the people of New Mexico, including the Amerindians, fining and imprisoning those who occupied the lands of others under the idea that these lands were the property of their inhabitants.

== Governor ==
=== First term ===
Vélez Cachupín was appointed governor of New Mexico in early 1749 and assumed the office in May of that year. After settling in New Mexico as governor, he noticed the frequent attacks the Comanches were directing against places where the Spanish and Mestizos lived. These attacks were not only dangerous because they resulted in kidnappings and the killing of settlers and their descendants in the province, but they also impeded economic growth. To remedy this situation, Cachupín decided to improve the quality of life of the indigenous people, hoping that they would respect him. In addition, he hoped that trade with the Native American tribes would help the economy of New Mexico.

As a result, in July 1750, a group of about 130 Comanches moved to Taos to live there temporarily. They were distributed in forty tents and established commercial relations with the residents of the region, with whom they exchanged hides and slaves. Although the governor agreed to the trade, he warned them to send a troop against them if, after trading with Taos, the Comanches raided Pecos and Galisteo. This mistrust was normal because the Spanish of the province considered the Comanches their main enemy. The Comanche chiefs promised not to assault those regions again, but not all Comanches cared about the threat. A group of them raided Pecos in November of that year.

After hearing this news, Vélez Cachupín led an army against the Comanches and started looking for them, which lasted six days. He found 145 of the Comanche attackers, which provoked the Battle of San Diego Pond, which pitted Spaniards against Comanches. The governor ordered his army to murder any Comanche they saw. After the battle began, only the cries of women and children persuaded him to give the Comanches a chance to surrender, promising them that he would not kill them if they abandoned the battle. At first, the Comanches were determined to fight. The battle only lasted until midnight when an adolescent, who was already wounded, surrendered with a reed cross in his hands. Vélez accepted his surrender and respected him, so the rest of the tribe came to trust the governor and abandoned the battle themselves. After this incident, only the chief and seven other men wanted to keep fighting. A new battle started at three o'clock, but the Comanches were quickly defeated. During the night Cachupín's army captured 49 Comanches, while the number of horses and mules they captured was over 150. The rest of the Comanches were killed. At dawn, Cachupín released almost all the prisoners, although he kept four. Vélez Cachupín forced them to refrain from attacking Spanish settlements, warning them that if they did, he would ban their trade with Taos and he would murder all of them. The courage he showed when he fought with the Comanches and the respect and compassion he directed towards them earned him the nickname "the captain who amazes" by the Comanches, who began to respect him. This also boosted the peace of the Spanish and Criollos with the Utes and Apaches (who became its principal allies).

In 1754, Vélez Cachupín promulgated a list of products traded by the Amerindians of the Plains. This list included the prices of the products those peoples traded together with the equivalent prices in Spanish currency, in order to regulate buying and selling at the fairs. The list was intended to prevent misunderstandings between the Comanches and Spaniards. On the other hand, Cachupín learned to relate with the Comanches, Utes and Apaches through the study of these people. In fact, Vélez Cachupín wrote to his successor about the behavior and the actions he should take when he contacted the Comanches, in order to avoid misunderstandings and maintain peace in New Mexico.

Also in 1754, Vélez Cachupín favored the migration to both the places that had already been abandoned and new places. These last ones were founded in strategic places, creating the new settlements of Abiquiu, Las Trampas, Ojo Caliente and Truchas, among others. Following the indications of Vélez Cachupín, a square with defensive functions would be established in these places. Few settlers, however, accepted the type of settlement Cachupín proposed.

==== Confrontation with the friars ====
Although Vélez Cachupín achieved peace with the Comanches, he gained an enemy in the Franciscans, especially Andres Varo. Vélez Cachupín and Varo sent a large number of letters to the viceroy criticizing each other. Although Vélez Cachupín defended the Christianization of the indigenous, which was carried out by the Franciscans, he rejected "to certain practices and specific priests". The Franciscans tried to expel VélezCachupín from his position as governor but were unable to do so, probably due to the familiarity and friendship between Vélez Cachupín and Viceroy Revilla Gigedo. Indeed, Vélez Cachupín was reappointed, despite the refusal of the Franciscans to make such an appointment.

=== Second term ===
After completing his first term in 1754, Vélez Cachupín returned to Spain. He appealed to the King of Spain for a new term as governor of New Mexico. Vélez Cachupín was reappointed as governor of the province on 14 March 1761. However, when he returned to New Mexico, he again had to solve many of the problems he had already solved during his previous term, as his successor had not followed his advice on to how to interact peacefully with the native peoples.

When he began his second term as governor, Vélez Cachupín found many Comanche prisoners present, so he decided to release six women to establish a new beginning of peace with the Comanches. Because of this, a group of fifteen Comanches (nine warriors and six women) went to Taos both to check that Vélez Cachupín was back in the province and to "negotiate" with him. Vélez Cachupín banned trade in Comanche slaves by the Spanish, in order to maintain peace. However, he also ordered the Spaniards and Creoles who resided near the provincial capital, Santa Fe, to keep their Comanche slaves, as the governor might have problems with the Comanches in the future and might need to exchange prisoners with them.

Vélez Cachupín not only had political functions, but also judicial and economic functions. In fact, he was New Mexico's chief judge (for both civil and criminal cases).

In November 1750, French traders Paul and Pierre Mallet visited New Mexico from New France. This was their second visit to New Mexico (the first was in 1739), but Vélez Cachupín took his goods and sold them at auction, which allowed him to pay four guards to take them to Mexico City. This was because the French had started a trade war with New Mexico and were trying to occupy most of northern Spanish Texas, making France one of its main rivals.

In 1762, after learning that a Ute had been found in possession of a silver ingot, Vélez Cachupín ordered Spanish explorers Juan Maria Antonio de Rivera, Joaquín Laín, Gregorio Sandoval, and Pedro Mora to Colorado to locate where the ingot had come from. Locating gold and silver was a priority in order to replenish the royal coffers. The expedition traveled through southwestern Colorado and southeastern Utah (which belonged to Spain at this time), establishing sections of the future Old Spanish Trail.

Vélez Cachupín also enacted a series of laws to protect Amerindian lands. In 1764, he gave land to the Amerindians and later convinced the Suma people to reside in San Lorenzo, near land he had given other Amerindians in 1764, promising to protect them. He also banned inhabitants of El Paso–Juárez (which at that time was a unique city) from entering Amerindian lands for any reason including grazing sheep and gathering firewood. In addition, any person who cut trees on Amerindian lands would be punished with a fine of 40 pesos or imprisonment for two years. Additionally, he would confiscate their carts and oxen. The money obtained from the fines was used to buy agricultural tools for the Sumas. In 1766, he banned the inhabitants of Atrisco from occupying land in San Fernando, because these lands were to be used only by their inhabitants. Whoever broke the ban would have to pay a fine of 30 pesos for each infraction. He also protected the lands of the Genizaros of Belen and of Santa Clara, and San Ildefonso Pueblo.

In November 1765, Velez Cachupín was forced to ban tobacco growing in New Mexico, following a law issued by the Viceroy, who had established a monopoly on the plant. The governor had tried unsuccessfully to prevent enforcement of the law, because it could harm the economy of the province and the relations between the Native Americans and the Spaniards, since they bought the tobacco from the farmers of New Mexico. Indeed, in January 1766, Vélez Cachupín reported to the viceroy through a letter the reasons why the law banning tobacco cultivation in New Mexico was harmful to the province, but the viceroy ignored it. When the law was established in the province, Vélez Cachupín's alleged consequences became real.

He was replaced by Pedro Fermín de Mendinueta y Garro as governor of Santa Fe de Nuevo México province in 1765.

== See also ==
- Colonial New Mexico
- List of Spanish governors of New Mexico
