= Hernando de Ugarte y la Concha =

15th Spanish Governor of New Mexico
- In office 1649–1653
- Preceded by: Luis de Guzmán y Figueroa
- Succeeded by: Juan de Samaniego y Xaca

Personal details
- Born: Fuenterabía in Guipúzcoa, Castille (in current Spain)

Hernando de Ugarte y la Concha was Governor of New Mexico from 1649 to 1653.

== Biography ==
Hernando de Ugarte y la Concha was born in Fuenterabía in Guipúzcoa, Castile, son of Juan de Ugarte and Juana de Anguicia. After Martín de Zavala had opened up the Nuevo León region in 1626, Ugarte became Captain of the newly founded settlement of Monterrey.

Ugarte was appointed Governor of New Mexico by Matías de Peralta, dean of the Audiencia of New Spain, holding office from 1649 to 1653. In 1650, he dispatched an expedition from Santa Fe, led by Captain Diego del Castillo, to explore what is now north central Texas. The expedition reached the territory of the Tejas Indians, and reported finding pearls on the Concho River. The Diego de Guadalajara expedition was launched in 1654 to follow up on Castillo's findings.

In 1650, Ugarte put down an uprising among the Jemez Indians, allied with the Navajos and some of the Tigua villages, that was meant to include all the pueblos, although not all joined in. Nine of the Jemez Indians were hanged as traitors, and others were sold as slaves. Following Ugarte's governorship, the New Mexico Pueblo people became increasingly restless, resenting Spanish efforts to resettle them and convert them to Christianity, and eventually revolted and broke free of Spain in 1680.
