= Francisco de la Mora y Ceballos =

Governor of colonial New Mexico (1632–1635)

7th Spanish Governor of New Mexico
- In office 03 March 1632 – 1635
- Lieutenant: Alonso Varela
- Preceded by: Francisco Manuel de Silva Nieto
- Succeeded by: Francisco Martínez de Baeza

Personal details
- Born: unknown unknown
- Died: unknown unknown
- Profession: Governor of New Mexico

Francisco de la Mora y Ceballos was a Spanish military officer and merchant who served as governor of colonial New Mexico between March 1632 and 1635.

== Biography ==
Ceballos joined the Spanish Army in his youth, eventually becoming the Captain of the Army.

=== Government in New Mexico ===
Ceballos was appointed Governor of Santa Fe de Nuevo México in 1632, while Alonso Varela was appointed as his lieutenant. In addition, Father Perea, a priest, worked for the Inquisition, where served as Commissary, and at the Definitory of the custody. However, later, Perea began to collaborate at the catholic mission of the Moqui Village, where he and other friars taught Christian doctrine to the indigenous population of the place to turn them into such faith. So, Fray Francisco de Porras was appointed Custodio of New Mexico, taking the place of Perea.

=== Trade relations ===
On his way to New Mexico, Ceballos tried to trade with the natives of some missions, using the friars as his agents. When the Franciscans opposed the trade with the Native Americans, Ceballos threatened them.

Ceballos arrived in Santa Fe on 3 March 1632, after leaving Mexico City. He began his administration sanctioning the Zuni Amerindians, who had killed two of the friars who worked at the missions of the province. However, he tried to keep his job as a merchant, while holding the position of governor, in order to enrich himself "by enlisting the assistance of the friars". Thus, Ceballos sold numerous products from Mexico City in the Amerindian villages.

According to Elizabeth Ann Harper John, he expropriated the belongings of the Spaniards and Native Americans of New Mexico. In addition, he traded in Santa Barbara "nine wagons load of loot" and most of the New Mexican livestock. Three years later, the population of New Mexico suffered hunger and disease.

In 1633, Ceballos issued laws that banned the workshops in the encomiendas and the slavery of Native Americans. Ironically, the Franciscans accused Ceballos of using indigenous (particularly orphaned) and military labor. Both groups were employed on their personal ranches. The governor even raised cattle on the corn lands of several Amerindian tribes, so they were forced to abandon their crops and take care of Ceballo's livestock. In any case, the ecclesiastics' denunciation of Ceballos was not due, simply, to the labor exploitation of the indigenous people, but was due to the idea that a non-ecclesiastic should not dispose of them nor of their lands, since many friars had their own farmland in Amerindian villages and the missions had their own cattle, despite being located in Amerindian villages.

In addition, Ceballos established the obligation to pay taxes to the Government of New Mexico on "wheat, corn, cassava, fish, cotton, vegetables, or anything else". In addition, it was asked that government officials in the province call a meeting of the royal officials, prelates, the bishop, and some "disinterested" persons to discuss the issue and decide the amount of money that people had to pay through tributes. The trustees were supposed to obey the decision by law, and their salary would be limited to the amount that had been set. However, the authorities and the church disobeyed those laws, due, respectively, to the "selfishness" and "jealousy" that they had.

Francisco de la Mora y Ceballos was replaced by Francisco Martínez de Baeza in 1635, returning (probably) to modern Mexico sometime in this year.
