= Enrique de Olavide y Michelena =

44th Spanish Governor of New Mexico
- In office 1736–1738
- Preceded by: Gervasio Cruzat y Gongora
- Succeeded by: Gaspar Domingo de Mendoza

23rd and 26th Governor of the Mariana Islands
- In office 8 September 1749 – 6 November 1756
- Monarch: Ferdinand VI
- First Secretary of State: José de Carvajal; Duke of Huéscar (as interim); Ricardo Wall
- Secretary of State for Indies: Marquess of Ensenada; Ricardo Wall (as interim); Julián Arriaga y Ribera
- Viceroy of New Spain: Juan Francisco de Güemes; Agustín de Ahumada
- Governor-General of the Philippines: José Antonio Raón y Gutiérrez
- Preceded by: Domingo Gómez de la Sierra
- Succeeded by: Andrés del Barrio y Rábago
- In office 9 June 1768 – 15 September 1771
- Monarch: Charles III
- First Secretary of State: Jerónimo Grimaldi
- Secretary of State for Indies: Julián de Arriaga y Ribera
- Viceroy of New Spain: Carlos Francisco de Croix
- Governor-General of the Philippines: José Antonio Raón y Gutiérrez; Simón de Anda y Salazar
- Preceded by: José de Soroa
- Succeeded by: Mariano Tobías

Personal details
- Born: Navarre, Spain

Enrique de Olavide y Michelena was the Governor of New Mexico (1746–1809) and the Mariana Islands (1749–1756 and 1768–1771).

== Career ==
Enrique de Olavide y Michelena was appointed Governor of Santa Fe de Nuevo México in 1736.

Michelena, accepting a petition of Alferez Juan Josh Moreno, delivered seven grazing lands (including Cara Del Rio, Santa Cruz and San Marcos) to the garrison of the Presidio of Santa Fe, so that they would have a place where their horses could graze. After the lands were granted, the shepherds who brought their cattle and flocks to these areas were expelled for good. They were forced to leave the lands in fifty days. They would be fined fifty pesos if they did not obey.

Toward the end of his term of appointment, in 1738, Olavide y Michelena traveled to Albuquerque. There, he gave up a piece of land to Nicolas Duran De Chavez, which he could use of temporarily way until a new governor was appointed to New Mexico to officially grant the request. The family of Duran was large and had few resources. He had nine children and a livestock from cows and sheep that had no grazing land. (Note: Finally, the next governor of New Mexico, Gaspar Domingo de Mendoza, granted new lands him.)

He was replaced by Gaspar Domingo de Mendoza in the New Mexico government in 1738.

On 8 September 1749, Olavide y Michelina was appointed governor of the Mariana Islands. As the new governor, he promoted the settlement of voluntary families on the Guam island, allowing development. The law was based on the law of the Spanish Crown. At least 6 families came to the islands. Olavide y Michelena ended his term as Governor on 6 November 1756. Andrés del Barrio y Rábago replaced him. He was appointed Governor of the Mariana Islands a second time on 9 June 1768, ending this term on 15 September 1771. Mariano Tobias was appointed the next Governor of the islands.
