= Portales Forest Reserve =

Former national forest in New Mexico

The Portales Forest Reserve was established by the United States General Land Office in New Mexico on October 3, 1905 with 172,680 acres (698.8 km^{2}). On March 16, 1907 the forest was disestablished and the lands were returned to the public domain.

The proclamation, signed by Theodore Roosevelt, stated that the land was "no longer required for experimental forest purposes."
