= Pedro Rodríguez Cubero =

31st Spanish Governor of New Mexico
- In office 1697 (appointment in June 6, 1692) – 1703
- Preceded by: Diego de Vargas
- Succeeded by: Diego de Vargas

Personal details
- Born: nearly July 29, 1656 (he was baptized on this date) Huéscar (Granada, Spain)
- Died: 1704 Mexico City
- Profession: Soldier and Governor of New Mexico
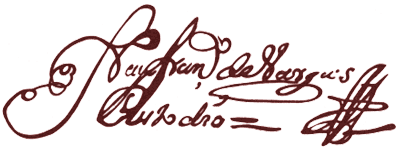
- Signature

Pedro Rodríguez Cubero (baptized July 29, 1656 – died 1704) was a Spanish admiral who served as the governor of New Mexico between 1697 and 1703.

== Biography ==
=== Early years ===
Pedro Rodríguez Cubero was born in Huéscar (Granada, Spain). He was baptized July 29, 1656 as the son of Antonio Rodríguez Cubero and María González Solá.

On June 20, 1674, Cubero joined the Spanish Army at the infantry unit of the Armada de El Mar Oceano (Ocean Sea's Army), starting as a common soldier (i.e. a musketman). In a successful career, he was promoted to the rank of admiral.

The same year he traveled to Sicily (at that time possessed by the Spanish) to quell an insurgency at Messina. Curbero subsequently fought in three battles against the French galleons and founded the church of Nuestra Señora del Pilar of Zaragoza. On June 17, 1689, Curbero obtained from King Charles II of Spain the office of governor and title of "Captain for Lifetime" of San Salvador de la Punta Fortress in Havana, Cuba.

=== Government of New Mexico ===
On June 6, 1692, Cubero was appointed as Captain General and Governor of Santa Fe de Nuevo México by King Charles II of Spain in place of Diego de Vargas. Initially Cubero rejected his appointment. He argued, based on information he was able to gather, that the climate of New Mexico was very cold and could harm his health. However his request was rejected. As such Cubero headed to New Mexico in 1697 to assume the governorship of that province, settling in Santa Fe and taking office on July 2, 1697.

In the same year, Cubero participated in an expedition to Zuni lands. In 1699, Cubero visited several villages in the west. Two years later, in 1701, after the destruction of Aguatuvi by the Hopi Native Americans, Cubero fought against them, killing some and capturing others. Later, Cubero freed the captives.

On the other hand, Cubero had news about corruption of Diego de Vargas, as well as of the imposed fines against him by Santa Fe council officials. However, initially, Cubero rejected the levied fines against his predecessor until the official formal charges convinced him that the former governor had embezzled money and impoverished the population through the poor economic management and maldistribution of food supplies among the population of colonial origin, causing famine between 1695 and 1696 (these offenses were punishable by a fine and the prison). These charges caused an hostility of the population against the government between 1694 and 1696. Vargas was subsequently convicted and forced to pay a fine of four thousand pesos. All of his property was confiscated and he was imprisoned for almost three years. (Note: Only at the end of his sentence, the king decided to accept the request for Vargas to be appointed governor of New Mexico for a second time. Despite the continuing accusations and his earlier imprisonment, the King publicly announced his thanks to Vargas and appointed him Governor of New Mexico again, besides grant him a peerage he left to his choice (he could choose to be named Marquis or Count).)

In 1703, Cubero granted lands to some people, per example Juana Baca.

In August 1703, Cubero heard the news that Vargas was in Mexico City and headed to Santa Fe to take the charge of governor of New Mexico (Vargas had taken over the government of New Mexico for the second time at the end of 1703). Fearing that Vargas would exert revenge against him because of his imprisonment, penalty fee, and property seizure that Cubero had perpetrated against him, he decided to leave New Mexico and flee to Mexico City, on the excuse he was going to fight Amerindians. Although he was appointed Governor of Maracaibo, Venezuela, he died in Mexico city in 1704, before he could travel to travel to the South American city to assume the charge.
