= Mateo Antonio de Mendoza =

Military leader

Mateo Antonio de Mendoza Díaz de Arce

35th Governor of Nueva Vizcaya
- In office 1753–1761
- Preceded by: Jaun Francico de la Puerta y de la Barrera
- Succeeded by: José Carlos de Agüero y González de Agüero

49th Spanish Governor of New Mexico (Acting)
- In office 1761–1761
- Preceded by: Francisco Antonio Marín del Valle
- Succeeded by: Manuel Portillo Urrisola

Personal details
- Spouse: Cecilia Catalina Mendoza y Davalillo
- Profession: Military leader and Captain General and Governor of Nueva Vizcaya and New Mexico

Mateo Antonio de Mendoza Díaz de Arce was a military leader and the governor of Nueva Vizcaya and Santa Fe de Nuevo Mexico in 1760. He was the interim governor between Francisco Antonio Marin del Valle and Manuel Portillo Urrisola.

== Early life ==
Mendoza's birthdate and birthplace are unknown. He was baptized on 28 September 1696 in Burgos, Spain, to Francisco Mendoza y Martínez de Fuidio and Teresa Díaz de Arce y Maeda. He was raised in a solar house in Villacarriedo, in the Spanish province of Santander.

By 1717, he had joined the Town Council in Ábalos, La Rioja. In 1751, Mendoza joined the Order of Santiago and served in the Spanish army, being a member of the Queen's Dragoons as lieutenant colonel and sergeant major.

== Career ==
In 1753, King Charles IV of Spain appointed him governor of the Captaincy General of Nueva Vizcaya, New Spain. After assuming the governor's charge, he settled in Chihuahua (in modern Mexico), where he resided until he ended his administration. During his administration, on 8 November 1758, he sent a troop led by Manuel Antonio de San Juan to Carrizal, in the modern-day Ahumada Municipality, to found the Presidio of San Fernando de las Amarillas del Carrizal. In addition, Mendoza ordered the troops stationed in Carrazal to accompany and defend travelers from possible threats on the Camino Real on their way to New Mexico or from there to other places. Mendoza performed his duties as governor of Nueva Vizcaya until 1761.

In 1761, Mendoza was appointed interim governor of New Mexico by Charles III to serve between Francisco Antonio Marin del Valle and Manuel Portillo Urrisola. Officially, he ruled only for a few months, but no document confirms he was in New Mexico.

Mendoza married Cecilia Catalina Mendoza y Davalillo on 27 September 1714, in San Asensio, in the La Rioja (Spain).
