= Joaquín Codallos =

Joaquín Codallos y Rabal

46th Spanish governor of New Mexico
- In office 1743–1749
- Preceded by: Gaspar Domingo de Mendoza
- Succeeded by: Tomás Vélez Cachupín

Personal details
- Profession: Spanish soldier and governor of colonial New Mexico
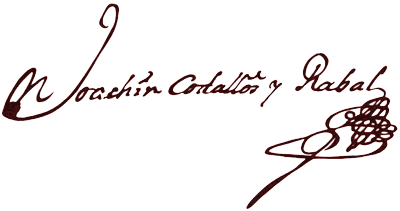
- Signature

Joaquín Codallos y Rabal was a Spanish soldier who served as the Spanish colonial governor of Santa Fe de Nuevo México province (present day New Mexico) from 1743 and 1749, located in the northern Viceroyalty of New Spain (colonial Mexico).

== Career ==
Codallos y Rabal joined the Spanish Army in his youth, soon achieving the rank of Major. In 1743, he was appointed governor of Santa Fe de Nuevo Mexico.

=== Trade, justice, and policy measures ===
After assuming the charge of governor of Santa Fe de Nuevo México, Codallos started to issue new laws, including the prohibition on gambling, and the posting of notices for caravans that came from elsewhere in New Spain. He also tried to prevent the illegal trade.

A group of residents in Albuquerque applied to the governor for a permit to trade local and export wool in New Mexico. The petition was accepted and the residents of Albuquerque, Santa Fe, and Santa Cruz were able to sell their wool among them. The Nuevomexicanos also exported wools to outlying regions of New Spain, providing favorable commerce for Santa Fe de Nuevo México.

In 1745, Codallos made a "vista general" (general visit), traveling across all the towns and cities of the province and asking the inhabitants to send him a list of their problems. He also invited them to voice "complaints against either local officials or the government". So, the population was concentrated in the square of Santa Fe and denounced some of these officers. Codallos y Rabal traveled across most towns and all Spanish settlements, with the exceptions of the distant "villages" of the Acoma Pueblo and Zuni people.

During the tenure of Codallos, crime increased slightly. A major case of crime that the Codallos government instigated was that of Manuel Sanz de Garvisu, who caused an insurrection and disobeyed the governor. As a result, Sanz de Garvisu was sent to the Southern New Mexico, to Chihuahua, with an armed escort. He was then sent to Mexico City. There, he was put of trial and imprisoned for his crimes.

=== Relations with the Native Americans ===
Shortly after beginning his administration in New Mexico, Codallos proposed a military campaign against the enemy Native American tribes. He forbade the mistreatment of women and children of these tribes while campaigns were ongoing. There are no records of additional campaigns. In 1745, Codallos sent troops to the priests Carlos Delgado and José de Yrigoyen when they traveled to the Moquis land to Christianize his inhabitants. The troops were to protect them from any possible attack. However the conversion attempt was unsuccessful. In 1747, Codallos sent a troop against the Gila Apache people, but the troop was defeated.

Codallos often fought the Utes and Comanches. In October, 1747, Codallos (according to the historian L. Bradford Prince) "killed 107, captured 206, and secured about 1000 horses". On the other hand, many of the people who lived in El Paso del Norte had migrated to other places, so (in 1748) Codallos ordered them to return, as the region was being attacked by Amerindian tribes and the governor did not have enough people to protect it.

In that same year (1747), a Genízaro spoke to Codallos about the conditions of Navajo lands. Codallos noted that the Navajos were being attacked by the Ute people, as they supported the Spanish government. However, the governor could not help the Navajo, and they continued to be attacked by the Ute people.

In 1748, under his administration, the Franciscan Menchero re-established the Sandia Pueblo.

=== Retirement ===
The government of Codallos y Rabal first ended in 1747, and the crown appointed Francisco de la Rocha as his successor. However, Rocha refused the position to govern New Mexico because he was sick and could not exercise his governmental responsibilities. For that reason, Codallos remained at the head of the government of the province until 1749, when the Spanish Crown appointed Tomas Velez Cachupin as the new governor of New Mexico.
