= Francisco Antonio Marín del Valle =

Spanish colonial governor

48th Spanish Governor of New Mexico
- In office 1754–1760
- Preceded by: Tomas Cachupín
- Succeeded by: Mateo Mendoza

Personal details
- Born: 1722
- Died: c. 1765 (aged c. 43)
- Spouse: Maria Ugarte (m. 1754)
- Profession: Miner, merchant, and Captain General
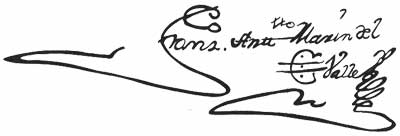
- Signature

Francisco Antonio Marín del Valle (1722 – c. 1765) was Governor and Captain General of New Mexico (now a U.S. state), between 1754 and 1760.

== Biography ==
Francisco Antonio Marin del Valle was baptized in the Villa del Lumbreras, Murcia, Spanish Empire, on July 12, 1722. He was the son of Francisco Marin del Valle and Manuela Saenz de Tejada and brother of Santiago Marín. His Paternal grandparents were Mateo Marín del Valle and Catalina Fraile. His maternal grandparents were Blas Sáenz de Tejada and María Garcia Baquedano. All them were natives and residents of this village.

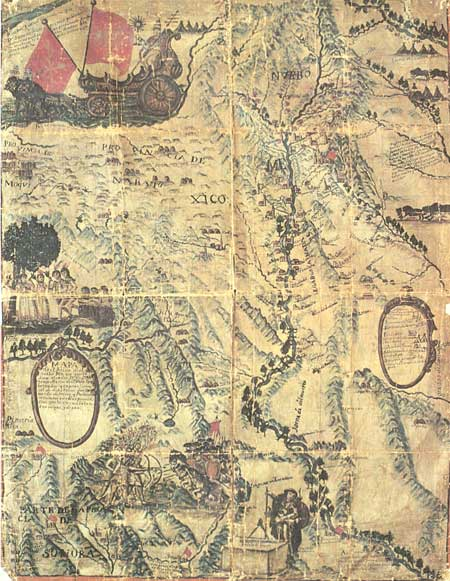
Map of New Mexico, 1760, drawn by Bernardo de Miera y Pacheco to Marín del Valle

When he came to South America, he settled in Potosí, where he worked in the mines of Charcas. Later he emigrated to New Spain, where became a merchant. Marín del Valle became mayor of Mexico City and fought in five military conflicts in the Southern New Mexico. Since 1743, Del Valle lived in El Paso (city that belonged to Santa Fe de Nuevo Mexico) and between 1754 and 1760 was Governor and Captain General of the Province of New Mexico.

In 1754, he ordered Spanish engineer and cartographer Bernardo de Miera y Pacheco to make a new map of Southern New Mexico. His work was the "first accurate and detailed map" of Río Bravo, particularly the part that coincides with New Mexico.

As the Spanish who lived in New Mexico had no churches, Marin del Valle ordered the construction of one church for them. He named the church as Nuestra Señora de la Luz (Our Lady of Light). The church was a military chapel. That's why the church was called, later, "La Castrense" (The Military).

Francisco Marin del Valle formed two brotherhoods: Nuestra Señora de la Luz and the Nuestra Señora de Valvanera.

He was replaced by Mateo Antonio de Mendoza in 1760.

== Personal life ==
Francisco Antonio Marín del Valle married Maria Ignacia Martinez de Ugarte (who was a wealthy aristocrat), in 1754. While he ruled New Mexico, he bought a piece of land located in front of the Governor's Palace, between two settlements. He established a chapel in that land.

== Legacy ==
The altarpiece of Nuestra Señora de la Luz was moved to the Cathedral of Santa Fe in 1859, because the military chapel had fallen to ruin. It was taken in 1939 to the Iglesia de Cristo Rey (Church of Christ the King), where it currently resides.

== See also ==
- Colonial New Mexico
- List of Spanish governors of New Mexico
