= Governor Chaves =

Governor Chaves may refer to:

- José Antonio Chaves, Governor of the territory of Santa Fe de Nuevo México from 1829 to 1832
- Mariano Chaves (1799–1845), Acting Mexican Governor of New Mexico in 1844
- Francisco Xavier Chávez (1768–1838), 2nd Governor of Santa Fe de Nuevo México in 1822
