= José Chávez =

José Chávez may refer to:

- José Chávez (actor) (1916–1988), Mexican actor
- José Chávez (footballer) (born 1983), Mexican footballer
- José Chávez Morado (1909–2002), Mexican painter and sculptor
- José Chávez y Castillo, Mexican landowner and trader who served as provisional Governor of New Mexico in 1845
- José Chávez y Chávez (1851–1924), outlaw from the U.S. state of New Mexico
- José María Chávez Alonso (1812–1864), Mexican politician
- José Luis Chávez (born 1986), Bolivian footballer
