= José Vizcarra =

José Vizcarra may refer to:

- José Antonio Vizcarra (fl. 1822-1830), Mexican governor and former soldier
- José Vizcarra (basketball) (1927-1976), Peruvian basketball player
- José Vizcarra (Argentine footballer) (born 1984), Argentine football forward
- José Vizcarra (Mexican footballer) (born 1990), Mexican football midfielder
