= History of New Mexico =

The history of New Mexico spans more than 12,000 years, beginning with the earliest human settlements in the region and continuing through Indigenous civilizations, Spanish colonization, Mexican governance, and incorporation into the United States. Its development reflects a long continuity of Indigenous presence alongside layers of cultural exchange, conflict, and adaptation among Native American, Hispanic, and Anglo populations.

Before European contact, the region was home to complex societies including the Ancestral Puebloans, Mogollon, and later Pueblo peoples, whose descendants continue to live in the area. In 1598, Spain established one of the northernmost provinces of its empire in North America, centered on Santa Fe, making it one of the oldest continuously governed regions in the present-day United States. Colonial rule was marked by missionary activity, cultural exchange, and resistance, most notably the Pueblo Revolt, in which Indigenous peoples temporarily expelled Spanish authorities. Following Mexican independence in 1821, New Mexico became a remote northern territory of Mexico, developing trade links with the United States via routes such as the Santa Fe Trail. After the Mexican–American War, the region was ceded to the United States under the Treaty of Guadalupe Hidalgo and organized as a U.S. territory in 1850. Its path to statehood was delayed by political and cultural factors, including its majority Spanish-speaking population, until it was admitted as the 47th state in 1912.

In the 20th century, New Mexico played a significant role in national defense and scientific development, particularly through the Manhattan Project at Los Alamos during World War II. Today, the state’s history is characterized by its enduring multicultural identity, shaped by the interaction of Indigenous traditions, Hispanic heritage, and later American influences.

== Native American settlements ==
Human occupation of New Mexico stretches back at least 11,000 years to the hunter-gatherer Clovis culture. They left evidence of their campsites and stone tools. After the invention of agriculture, the land was inhabited by the Ancestral Puebloans, who built houses out of stone or adobe bricks. They experienced a Golden Age around AD 1000, but climate change led to migration and cultural evolution. From those people arose the historic Pueblo peoples who lived primarily along the few major rivers. The most important rivers are the Rio Grande, the Pecos, the Canadian, the San Juan, and the Gila.

Prehistoric New Mexicans
Culture or group	Time	Location found	Important development
Clovis	11,000 to 9200 BCE	Eastern Plains	Hunted big game
Folsom	8200 BCE	American Southwest	Hunted big game
Desert Culture I	6000 to 2000 BCE	American Southwest	Hunted small game; gathered seeds, nuts, and berries
Desert Culture II	2000 to 500 BCE	American Southwest	Developed early gardening skills, baskets, and milling stones
Mogollon	300 BCE to CE 1150	West-central and southwestern New Mexico	Farmed crops, made pottery, and lived in pit-house villages
Anasazi: Basketmaker	CE 1 to 500	Northwestern New Mexico	Used the Atlatl, gathered food, and made fine baskets
Modified Basketmaker	CE 500 to 700	Northwestern New Mexico	Lived in pit house villages, used the manos and metate, learned pottery-making, and used bows and arrows
Developmental Pueblo	CE 700 to 1050	Northwestern New Mexico	Built Adobe houses, used cotton cloth and infant cradleboards
Great Pueblo	CE 1050 to 1300	Northwestern New Mexico (Chaco Canyon, Aztec)	Built multistory pueblos, practiced irrigation, and laid out road systems
Rio Grande Classic	CE 1300 to 1600	West-central New Mexico, Rio Grande Valley, Pecos	Abandoned northwestern New Mexico sites, migrated to new areas of settlement, and changed building and pottery style

== Pueblos ==
By about 700 to 900 CE, the Pueblo people began to abandon ancient pit houses dug in cliffs and build apartment-like structures with rectangular rooms. By 1050 CE, they had developed planned villages composed of large terraced buildings, each with many rooms. These villages were often constructed on defensive sites—on rocky outcrops, flat summits, or steep-sided mesas, locations that would afford the people protection from their northern enemies. The largest of these villages, Pueblo Bonito in Chaco Canyon, New Mexico, contained around 700 rooms in five stories and may have housed as many as 1000 persons. No larger apartment-house type construction would be seen on the continent until the 19th century. Then, around 1150, Chacoan society began to unravel.

Long before the Spanish arrival, descendants of the Ancestral Puebloans (Anasazi) were using irrigation canals, check dams and hillside terracing as techniques for bringing water to what was an arid, agriculturally marginal area. Ceramics became more elaborate, cotton replaced yucca fiber as the main clothing material and basket weaving became more artistic.

The Pueblo people built a flourishing sedentary culture in the 13th century CE, constructing small towns in the valley of the Rio Grande and nearby. The Spanish encountered Pueblo civilizations in the 16th century.

== Athabaskans-Apachean ==
The Navajo and Apache peoples are members of the large Athabaskan language family, which includes peoples in Alaska and Canada, and along the Pacific Coast.

The historic peoples encountered by the Europeans did not make up unified tribes in the modern sense, as they were highly decentralized, operating in bands of a size adapted to their semi-nomadic cultures. From the 16th to the 19th centuries, the European explorers, missionaries, traders and settlers referred to the different groups of Apache and Navajo by various names, often associated with distinctions of language or geography. These Athabaskan peoples identified themselves as Diné, which means "the people." The Navajo and Apache made up the largest non-Pueblo Indian group in the Southwest. These two tribes led nomadic lifestyles and spoke related languages.

Some experts estimate that the semi-nomadic Apache were active in New Mexico in the 13th century. Spanish records indicated that they traded with the Pueblo. Spanish slave raids of the Apache resulted in a long-lasting animosity between the two peoples which did not end until the surrender of Geronimo in 1886. The Navajo also raided the Spanish settlements until subjugated by Kit Carson in 1864.

The Navajo Nation, with more than 300,000 citizens is the largest federally recognized tribe in the United States. They live in present-day northwestern New Mexico and northeastern Arizona. The Mescalero Apache live east of the Rio Grande. The Jicarilla Apache live west of the Rio Grande. The Chiricahua Apache live in southwestern New Mexico and southeastern Arizona.

== Spanish exploration and colonization ==
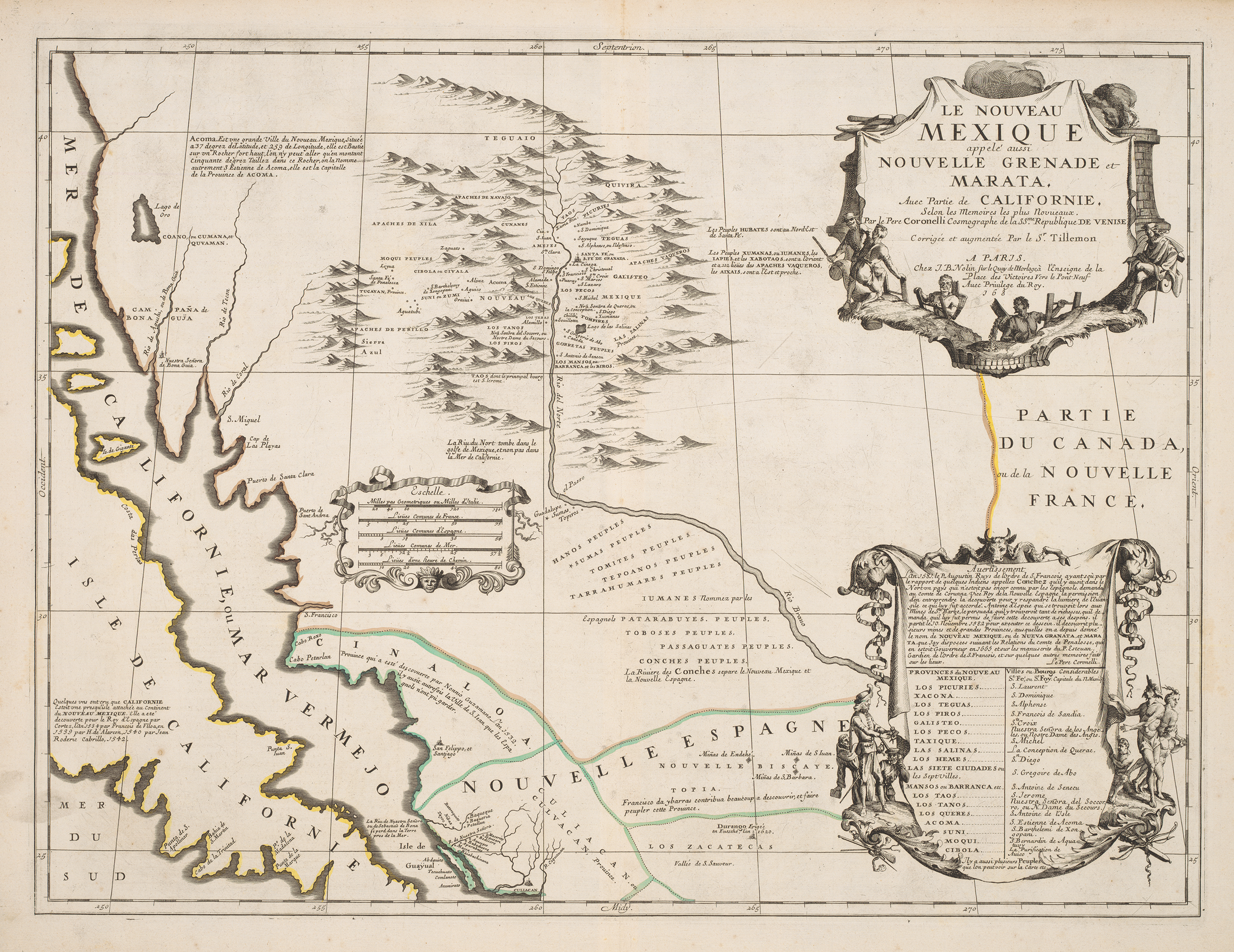
Jean Nicolas Du Tralage and Vincenzo Coronelli's 1687 map of New Mexico

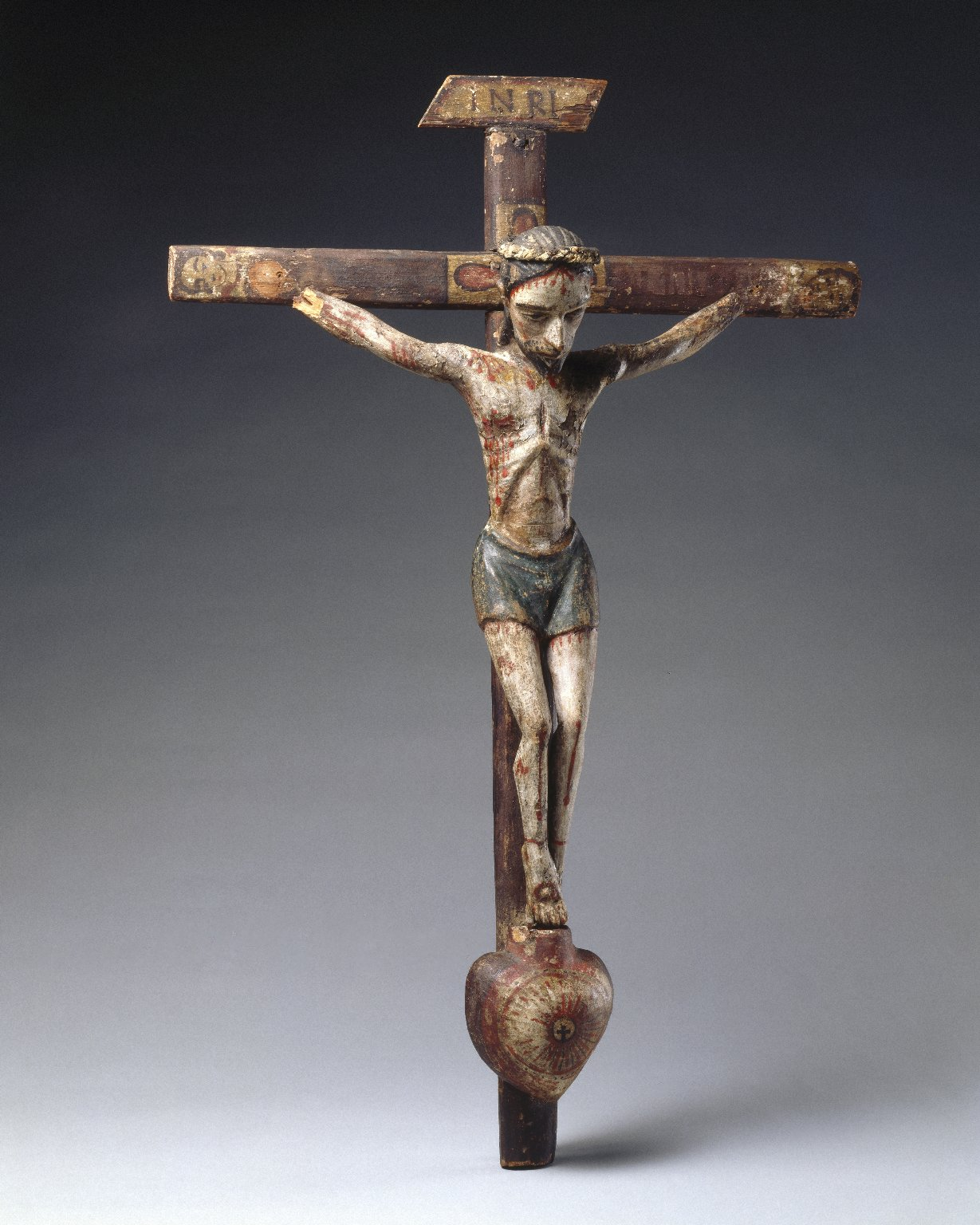
José Rafael Aragón, Crucifix, ca. 1795–1862, Brooklyn Museum, From about 1750, Catholic churches in Spanish New Mexico were increasingly decorated with the work of native craftspeople rather than with paintings, sculpture, and furniture imported from Europe. This small santo (religious image) is typical of the locally produced objects. It is made of indigenous pine and painted with water-based pigments used by native artisans.

Cabeza de Vaca, one of only four survivors of the Pánfilo de Narváez expedition of 1527, may have traveled through what is now New Mexico and Arizona. In 1535, he tells of hearing Indigenous people talk about fabulous cities somewhere in the North American Southwest. Fray Marcos de Niza enthusiastically identified these as the mythologized Seven Cities of Cíbola, also called the seven cities of gold.

Francisco Vázquez de Coronado assembled an enormous expedition in 1540–1542, to explore and find the mythical Seven Golden Cities of Cibola, as described by Marcos de Niza. Coronado took 1,300 horses and mules for riding and packing, and hundreds of head of sheep and cattle as a portable food supply. Coronado's party found several adobe pueblos (towns) in 1541 but no rich cities of gold. Further widespread expeditions found no fabulous cities anywhere in the Southwest or Great Plains. It is likely that some of Coronado's horses escaped, to be captured and adopted for use by Plains Indians. Over the next two centuries, they made horses at the center of their nomadic cultures. Only two of Coronado's horses were mares.

More than 50 years after Coronado, Juan de Oñate came north from the Valley of Mexico with 500 Spanish settlers and soldiers and 7,000 head of livestock, founding the first Spanish settlement in New Mexico on July 11, 1598. The governor named the settlement San Juan de los Caballeros. This means "Saint John of the Knights." San Juan was in a small valley. Nearby the Chama River flows into the Rio Grande. Oñate pioneered El Camino Real de Tierra Adentro, "The Royal Road of the Interior Land," a 700-mile (1,100 km) trail from the rest of New Spain to his remote colony. Oñate was appointed as the first governor of the new province of Santa Fe de Nuevo México. Although he intended to achieve the total subjugation of the Natives, Oñate noted in 1599 that the Pueblo "live very much the same as [the Spanish] do, in houses with two and three terraces."

The Native Americans at Acoma revolted against this Spanish encroachment but faced severe suppression. In battles with the Acomas, Oñate lost 11 soldiers and two servants, killed hundreds of Indigenous peoples, and punished every man over 25 years of age by the amputation of their left foot. The Franciscans found the Pueblo people increasingly unwilling to consent to baptism by newcomers who continued to demand food, clothing and labor. Acoma is also known as the oldest continually inhabited city in the United States.

Oñate's capital of San Juan proved to be vulnerable to Apache (probably Navajo) attacks. Governor Pedro de Peralta moved the capital and established the settlement of Santa Fe in 1610 at the foot of the Sangre de Cristo Mountains. Santa Fe is the oldest state capital city in the United States. Peralta built the Palace of the Governors in 1610. Although the colony failed to prosper, some missions survived. Spanish settlers arrived at the site of Albuquerque in the mid-17th century.

The exploitative nature of Spanish rule resulted in their conducting nearly continuous slave raids and reprisals against the nomadic Indian tribes on the borders, especially the Apache and Navajo. The Indians responded in kind.

Franciscan missionaries accompanied Oñate to New Mexico; afterward there was a continuing struggle between secular and religious authorities. Both colonists and the Franciscans depended upon Indigenous labor, mostly the Pueblo, the sedentary people of the Rio Grande valley, and competed with each other to control a decreasing Indigenous population. The Indigenous suffered high mortality because of infectious diseases unknowingly brought by the Spaniards, to which they had no immunity, and the exploitation that disrupted their societies. The struggle between the Franciscans and the civil government came to a head in the late 1650s. Governor Bernardo Lopez de Mendizabal and his subordinate Nicolás de Aguilar forbade the Franciscans to punish the Indigenous or employ them without pay. They granted the Pueblo permission to practice their traditional dances and religious ceremonies. After the Franciscans, led by Alonso de Posada, protested, Lopez and Aguilar were arrested, turned over to the Inquisition, and tried in Mexico City. Thereafter, the Franciscans reigned supreme in the province. Pueblo dissatisfaction with the rule of the clerics was the main cause of the Pueblo revolt.

The Spanish in New Mexico were never able to gain dominance over the Indigenous peoples, who lived among and surrounded them. The isolated colony of New Mexico was characterized by "elaborate webs of ethnic tension, friendship, conflict, and kinship" among Indigenous groups and Spanish colonists. Because of the weakness of New Mexico, "rank-and-file settlers in outlying areas had to learn to coexist with Indigenous neighbors without being able to keep them subordinate." The Pueblo Indians were the first group to challenge Spanish rule significantly.

== Pueblo Revolt of 1680 ==
Many of the Pueblo people harbored hostility toward the Spanish, due to their oppression and prohibition of their practice of traditional religion. The economies of the pueblos (towns) were disrupted, as the people were forced to labor on the encomiendas of the colonists. The Spanish introduced new farming implements which the Pueblo adopted and provided some measure of security against Navajo and Apache raiding parties. The Pueblo lived in relative peace with the Spanish from the founding of the northern New Mexico colony in 1598.

In the 1670s, drought swept the region, causing famine among the Pueblo, and attracting increased attacks from neighboring nomadic tribes trying to gain food supplies. Spanish soldiers were unable to defend the settlements adequately. At the same time, European-introduced diseases caused high mortality among the natives, decimating their communities. Dissatisfied with the protective powers of the Spanish Crown and its god of the Catholic Church, the Pueblo returned to their old gods. This provoked a wave of repression by New Mexico governor Juan Francisco Treviño, as well as the Franciscan missionaries. Following his arrest on a charge of witchcraft and subsequent release, Po'pay (or Popé) planned and orchestrated the Pueblo Revolt.

After being freed, Po'pay moved to Taos and dispatched runners to all the Pueblos carrying knotted cords, the knots signifying the number of days remaining until the appointed day for them to rise together against the Spaniards. The rebellion was successful The Spanish were driven from all but the southern portion of New Mexico. They set up a temporary capital at El Paso while making preparations to reconquer the rest of the province.

The retreat of the Spaniards left New Mexico controlled by the Indigenous Pueblo republic. Po'pay ordered the Indians, under penalty of death, to burn or destroy crosses and other Catholic religious imagery, as well as any other vestige of the Spanish culture. He also wanted to destroy Spanish livestock and fruit trees. Kivas (rooms for religious rituals) were reopened, and Po'pay ordered all Indians to bathe in soap made of yucca root. He forbade the planting of Spanish crops of wheat and barley. Po'pay ordered those Indians married by the rites of the Catholic Church to dismiss their wives, and take others under their traditional ways. He took control of the Governor's Palace as ruler of the Pueblo, and collected tribute from each Pueblo until his death in 1688.

Following their success, the different Pueblo tribes, separated by hundreds of miles and six different languages, quarreled. These power struggles, combined with raids from nomadic tribes and a seven-year drought, weakened the Pueblos. In July 1692, Diego de Vargas led Spanish forces that surrounded Santa Fe, where he called on the Indians to surrender, promising clemency if they would swear allegiance to the king of Spain and return to the Christian faith. The Indigenous leaders gathered in Santa Fe, met with De Vargas, and agreed to peace. While the Pueblo had only achieved a short-lived independence from the Spaniards, they gained a measure of freedom from future Spanish efforts to impose their culture and religion following the reconquest. The Spanish issued land grants to each Pueblo, and appointed a public defender to protect the rights of the Indigenous and argue their legal cases in the Spanish courts.

While developing Santa Fe as a trade center, the returning settlers founded Albuquerque in 1706, naming for the viceroy of New Spain, the Duke of Alburquerque. Prior to its founding, Albuquerque consisted of several haciendas and communities along the lower Rio Grande. Ranching and some farming in the 18th century were the basis for the economy of New Mexico.

== Spanish relations with the natives ==
From the date of the founding of New Mexico, the Pueblo people and Spanish settlers were plagued by hostile relationships with nomadic and semi-nomadic Navajo, Apache, Ute, and Comanche people. These tribes raided the more sedentary peoples for livestock, food supplies and stores, and captives to ransom or use as slaves.

The southwestern natives developed a horse culture, raiding Spanish ranches and missions for their horses, and ultimately breeding and raising their own herds. The native horse culture quickly spread throughout western America. Navajo and Apache raids for horses on Spanish and Pueblo settlements began in the 1650s or earlier. Through the Pueblo Revolt of 1680, the Indians acquired many horses. By the 1750s the Plains Indians horse culture was well established from Texas to Alberta, Canada. The Navajo, in addition to being among the first mounted Native Americans in the U.S., were unique in developing a pastoral culture based on sheep stolen from the Spanish. By the early 18th century, the Navajo households typically owned herds of sheep.

=== Comancheria protectorate ===
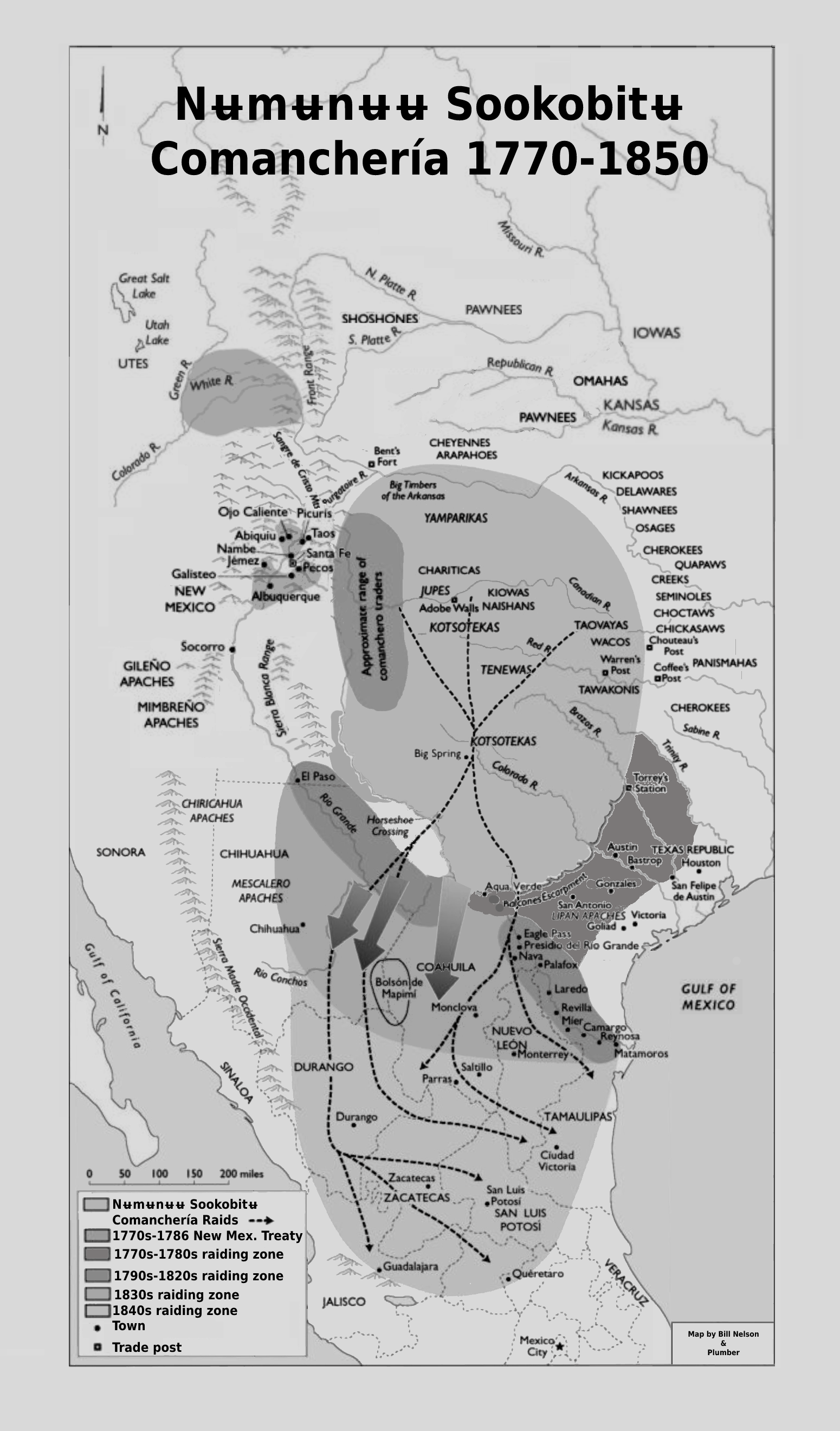
Comancheria and the New Mexico settlements prior to 1850.

After the Pueblo revolt, the Comanche posed the most serious threat to the Spanish settlers. Scholar Hämäläinen (2008) argues that from the 1750s to the 1850s, the Comanche ruled an empire known as Comancheria. The Comanche empire was based on a raiding, hunting and pastoral economy and rooted in an extensive commercial network that facilitated long-distance trade. The Comanche spread their language and culture across the region..

In 1706, colonists in New Mexico first recorded the Comanche; by 1719 they were raiding the colony as well as other native peoples. The other tribes had primarily raided for plunder, but the Comanche introduced a new level of violence to the conflict. The Comanche were well mounted by the 1730s. They were more elusive and mobile than the semi-nomadic Apache and Navajo, who were dependent upon agriculture or herding for part of their livelihoods. The Comanche both raided and traded with the Spanish settlers. They were especially prominent at the annual Taos trade fair, where they peacefully exchanged hides, meat and captives, often before or after raiding other settlements.

Comanche raids endangered the survival of colonial New Mexico, stripping the settlements of horses, forcing the abandonment of many settlements, and in 1778 killing 127 Spanish settlers and Pueblo people. Between 1760 and 1776, the non-Pueblo population of New Mexico declined from 11,194 to 9,742, largely as a result of Indian raids. Punitive expeditions by the Spanish and their native allies against the Comanche were usually ineffective, but in 1779 a Spanish and Puebloan force of 560 men, led by Juan Bautista de Anza, surprised a Comanche village near Pueblo, Colorado and killed Cuerno Verde (Green Horn), the most prominent of the Comanche war leaders. The Comanche subsequently sued for peace with New Mexico, joined the New Mexicans in expeditions against their common enemy, the Apache, and turned their attention to raiding Spanish settlements in Texas and northern Mexico. The New Mexicans on their part took care not to re-antagonize the Comanche and lavished gifts on them. The peace between New Mexico and the Comanche endured until the United States conquest of the province in 1846 during the Mexican–American War.

Peace with the Comanche stimulated a growth in the population of New Mexico; settlements expanded eastward onto the Great Plains. The inhabitants of these new settlements were mostly genizaros, natives and the descendants of natives who had been ransomed from the Comanche and other tribes

== U.S. exploration ==
Following Lewis and Clark, many men started exploring and trapping in the western parts of the United States. Sent out in 1806, Lt. Zebulon Pike's orders were to find the headwaters of the Arkansas and Red rivers. He was to explore the southwestern part of the Louisiana Purchase. In 1807, when Pike and his party crossed into the San Luis Valley of northern New Mexico they were arrested and taken to Santa Fe, and then sent south to Chihuahua where they appeared before the Commandant General Salcedo. After four months of diplomatic negotiations, Pike and his party were returned to the United States, under protest, across the Red River at Natchitoches.

== Mexican territory ==
New Mexico population estimates, 1600–1850
Date	Spanish	Pueblo
1600	700	80,000
1609	60	?
1620	800	17,000
1638	800	40,000
1680	1,470	17,000
1749	4,353	10,658
1756	5,170	8,694
1800	19,276	9,732
1820	28,436	9,923
1842	46,988	16,510

=== Revolution and Mexican Independence ===
The decade that led up to independence was a painful period in the history of Mexico. In 1810 Catholic priest Miguel Hidalgo y Costilla instigated a war for independence in central Mexico, a struggle that quickly took on the character of a class war. The following year, military captain Juan Bautista de las Casas instigated a coup within the royalist regime. Sympathizing with the poor underclass, Casas opened up a line of dialogue with the revolutionaries. This caused the Spanish elite to instigate its own counter coup and executed Casas. For years afterward the regime failed to regain coherency and the mandate to administer. These ideological struggles affected peripheral New Mexico much less than they did the national center, but it resulted in a sense of alienation with central authority.

Furthermore, in 1818 a longstanding peace between the settled communities of New Mexico and the neighboring nomadic Indigenous tribes broke down. Just a month after swearing loyalty to the new Mexican government in 1821, Governor Facundo Melgares led a raid into Navajo country.

For these reasons it is highly surprising that the transition from Spanish to Mexican rule occurred as peacefully as it did. In New Mexico the event passed with few shows of enthusiasm or partisanship. Festivals were largely a lackluster affair and held only at the behest of the revolutionary government which expressed that they should be held, "in all the form and with the magnificence that the oaths of allegiance to the Kings have previously been read." But there was no renewed civil war and the provisional government was given the grudging support of most of society.

Trade along the Santa Fe Trail was opened following Mexican independence. With this trade came a new influx of citizens from the United States. Prior to independence, the estranjeros (foreigners) were not allowed to participate in receiving land grants, but now, along with the open trade, a few would become participating owners of these merceds (grants).

=== Federalist stage ===
In 1824 a new constitution was drafted, that established Mexico as a federalist republic. A generally liberal-minded atmosphere that had pervaded Mexico since independence led to generous grants of local autonomy and limited central power. New Mexico in particular was able to take advantage and to carve out significant privileges in this new system. Classified as a territory rather than a state, it had reduced representation in the national government but broad local autonomy. Because of the advanced age of New Mexican society and its relative sophistication, it was uniquely placed to take advantage of its position as a frontier but still effecting influence in the rest of the country.

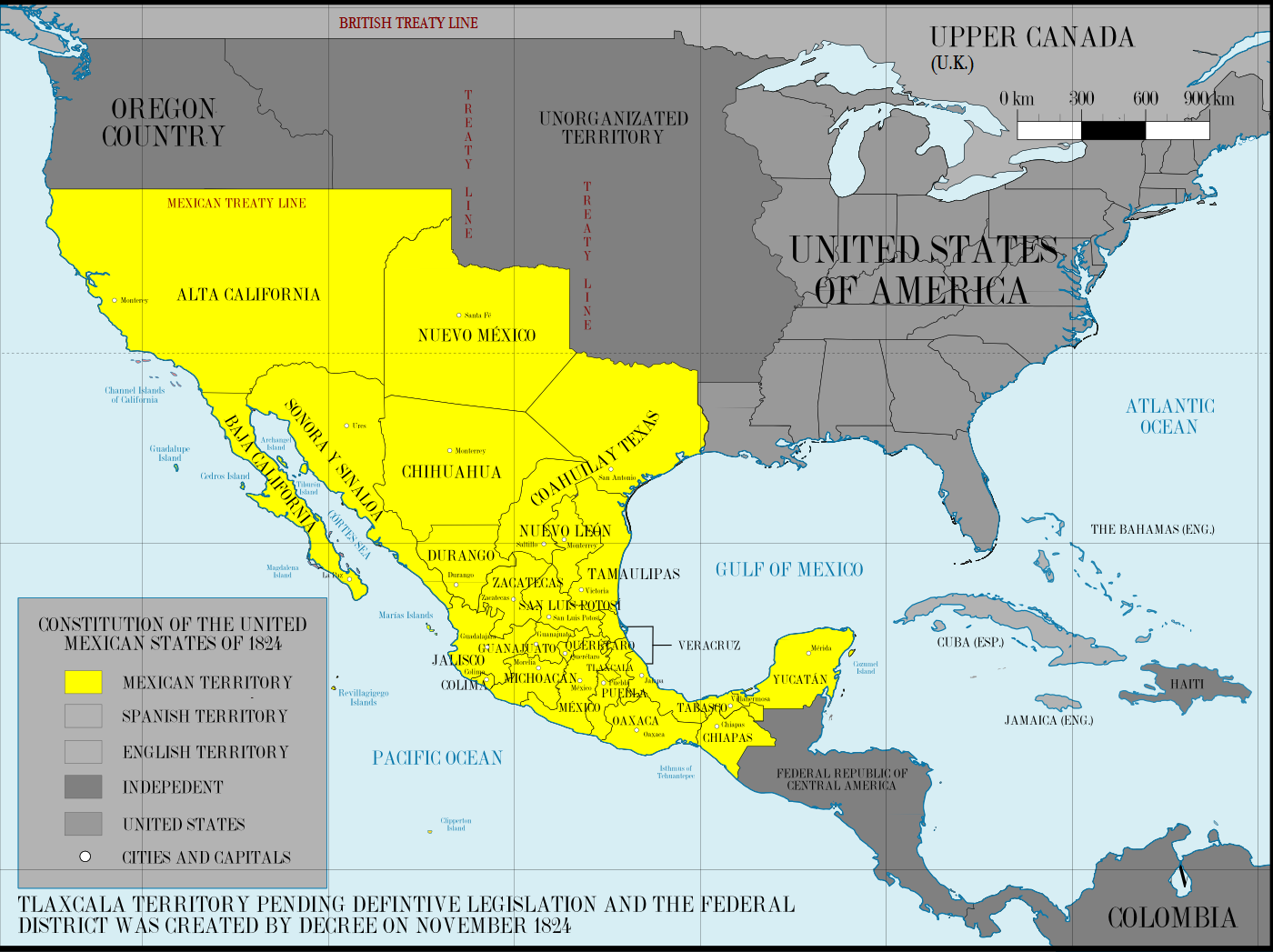
Province of New Mexico when it belonged to Mexico in 1824

One of the defining features of the Mexican period in the history of New Mexico was the attempt to instill a nationalist sentiment. This was a tremendous challenge considering the nature of identity in Mexico during the Spanish empire. Under the official dictates of the empire, subjects were classified in terms of ethnicity, class and position in society. These legal distinctions kept groups separate, and movement between groups was regulated. Ethnic Europeans made up the upper crust of this system, with Peninsulars—those born in Spain itself—comprising the true elite, while Mexican-born Europeans, the creoles, were ranked just below them. At the bottom were the masses of Indigenous and Mestizos, who had few legal rights and protections against the abuse of their superiors.

Nationalists attempted to establish equality, if only legally, between these disparate groups. The local autonomy New Mexicans had established inhibited these endeavors and throughout the Mexican period the elite continued to maintain their privileges. Nevertheless, the inhabitants of New Mexico were able to adapt their old identity as Spanish subjects to Mexican nationals. Instead of a purely modern liberal sense of identity, this adapted Spanish feudalism to a geographic area. The evidence of this success in nationalism can be seen in the Pueblo myth of Montezuma. This held that the original Aztec homeland lay in New Mexico, and the original king of the Aztecs was a Pueblo. This creates a symbolic, and completely artificial, connection between the Mexican center and an isolated frontier society.

=== Centralist Republic and Río Arriba Rebellion ===
The federalist and liberal atmosphere that pervaded Mexican thought since independence fell apart in the mid-1830s. Across the political spectrum there was the perception that the previous system had failed and needed readjustment. This led to the dissolution of the 1824 constitution and the drafting of a new one based on centralist lines. As Mexico drifted farther and farther toward despotism, the national project began to fail and the nation fell into a crisis.

Along the frontier, formerly autonomous societies reacted aggressively to a newly assertive central government. The most independent province, Texas, declared its independence in 1835, triggering the sequence of events that led directly to Mexico's collapse. The Rio Arriba Rebellion of 1837 in New Mexico itself overthrew and executed the centrally appointed governor and demanded increased regional authority. This revolt was defeated within New Mexican society itself by Manuel Armijo.

Governor Albino Pérez had arrived from central Mexico in 1835 during the time of the Centralist Republic, which sought to turn all subdivisions of New Mexico into departments governed from Mexico City rather than the local people in the aftermath of a worldwide economic crash and depression. The Pérez administration was opposed by the people and especially by the inhabitants of the northern part of the territory, who resented the "outsider" forced upon them by President Santa Anna. Their dissatisfaction was exacerbated when, following Santa Anna's defeat in Texas, the Mexican government drafted a constitution that tightened administration and tax-collection and imposed property qualifications on political participation. New Mexicans assumed that Pérez would attempt to levy the taxes and completely restructure the regional political system in accordance with the new constitution.

Other grievances included Pérez's reinstatement of Francisco Sarracino, a former governor who had been suspended for fraud from his position as subcomisario (a customs official); Pérez's appointment of a civil servant named Ramón Abreu as prefect when others thought they were better candidates; Pérez's failure to rein in customs officials who defrauded American traders on the Santa Fe Trail, some of whom lived in Taos in Northern New Mexico; and the inadequate food and bad conditions endured by men forced to serve in the militia against the Navajo and Apache. Some may also have resented his adultery (he openly had a relationship with his housekeeper, his wife being in Mexico City) and his wealth and luxurious possessions, as most New Mexicans were poor.

Opposition to Pérez increased, with his opponents circulating rumors of enormous taxes. The Departmental Assembly's list of three nominees for the next gubernatorial term did not include him. Opposition culminated in the summer of 1837, with the spark that set off the rebellion having to do with the alcalde (mayor) of Santa Cruz de la Cañada, Juan José Esquibel. Esquibel had accepted a bribe from a relative to release him from jail when charged with a "grave crime" and had defied Pérez's order to pay a fine and return his relative to jail. Then Esquibel supported two merchants against a man who had documentation that they owed him money. Pérez's appointee as prefect, Ramón Abreu, suspended Esquibel and on learning of the bribe, had him put in jail in irons. At the end of July a mob freed Esquibel, and he organized a rebellion.

On August 1, rebels from the northern New Mexican communities gathered at Santa Cruz de la Cañada (near Chimayó) with Native Americans from the surrounding pueblos. They called themselves the Cantón (neighborhood or district). On August 3, their twelve leaders, including Esquibel, issued the following declaration:

For God and the Nation and the Faith of Jesus Christ! The principal points we defend are the following: 1. To be with God and the Nation and the Faith of Jesus Christ. 2. To defend our country until we shed every drop of our blood in order to obtain the victory we have in view. 3. Not to admit the Department Plan. 4. Not to admit any tax. 5. Not to admit any disorder desired by those who are attempting to procure it. God and the Nation! Encampment Santa Cruz de la Cañada, August 3, 1837.

When Pérez heard of the rebellion, he attempted to raise a militia of volunteers, but his call did not meet with an encouraging answer. On August 9, Pérez started for Santa Cruz with the troops at his command, meeting the rebels near San Ildefonso. Most of Pérez's men promptly abandoned him and joined the rebels. Pérez retreated to Santa Fe with the few men who remained loyal to him. Unable to find security in the capital, Pérez attempted to flee the city by night, but a group of Santo Domingo Indians intercepted and killed him. The rebels decapitated Pérez and returned his head to Santa Fe for public display. Secretary of the Department Jesús María Alarid, former interim governor and substitute district judge (Juez de Distrito Suplente) of District Court of the New Mexico Territory (Juzgado de Distrito del Territorio de Nuevo México) Santiago Abreú (one of Ramón's brothers), and approximately 20 officials from the Pérez government were also killed, some by mutilation.

That same day on 10 August, the rebels entered the capital and placed José Gonzales, a Genizaro (of Taos Pueblo and Pawnee ancestry) from Chimayo, in possession of the palace and as governor of the territory. Initially the rebel government was widely popular in the Department, but it soon made enemies by committing atrocities in gaining power and confiscating the massacre victims' property (at the expense of not only their heirs but also their creditors). The ruling junta popular was contentious and indecisive, its minutes full of crossed-out sections. Meanwhile, in Santa Cruz, the Cantón did not dissolve, instead continuing to imprison people and threaten them with death, outside the control of Gonzales's government (Lecompte 1985, pp. 40–46). In Taos, unrest broke out against the Catholic Church and its leader there, Padre Martínez, in early September.

In the town of Tomé in southern New Mexico, the priest, Francisco Antonio de Madariaga, began agitating for a counterrevolution. On September 8, he and other "citizens who love their country" adopted the "Plan of Tomé", which named former governor Manuel Armijo to command their force. The 600-man army detachment of Santa Fe, which Gonzales had disbanded, reorganized and marched south to join Armijo. Armijo wrote to the Mexican authorities, explaining the situation, and then marched to Santa Fe. He met little resistance; indeed Gonzales, who had gone to Taos to visit his family, was arrested in Santa Fe on September 11, before Armijo's arrival on the 14th. While in Santa Fe, Armijo wrote to Mexico again, stating what he had done and asking for troops to complete his victory and re-establish peace.

A former mayor of Taos, Pablo Montoya, led a Cantón force of reportedly 3000 men on Santa Fe. Though Armijo had only about 1,000 soldiers, they were much better trained and equipped than the rebels, and Armijo negotiated a peace treaty that was signed September 21. The rebels surrendered Juan José Esquibel and three other men from Santa Cruz to be indicted, but Gonzales was released and the other rebels received amnesty. Montoya would later be executed for his part in the Taos Rebellion.

In October, the rebellion flared up yet again in Las Truchas, east of Santa Cruz. Armijo ordered the execution of Esquibel and the three other prisoners, but to Armijo's anger, his subordinates postponed the execution. Armijo spent the next few months raising funds to feed and pay his soldiers, who were on the point of mutiny. In January 1838, federal troops from Zacatecas and Chihuahua arrived in response to Armijo's request, bringing his official appointment to the governorship.

On January 23, Armijo sent an ultimatum to the rebels in Truchas. The following day, when they did not surrender, he had his four prisoners executed. On the 27th he marched toward Santa Cruz, where Gonzales and Antonio Vigil of Truchas were gathering their forces to return to Santa Fe. The two armies met between Santa Cruz and Pojoaque, and Armijo's forces (commanded by Lt. Col. Cayetano Justiniani of the Veracruz dragoons) prevailed in the battle. Gonzales fled to Santa Cruz where, by Armijo's order, he was executed in the public square.

The government was a federal republic composed of individual Pueblos and Hispano towns, and "for the first and only time in the history of New Mexico, its duly elected governor was an Indian."

The rebels demonstrated by their actions that they comprised an inclusive entity. They sent letters to the Pueblos inviting their leaders to participate in the Junta Popular. A letter dated 21 August 1837 to Josecito Archibeque, the Indian governor of Cochiti Pueblo, informed him of threats to the rebellion and invited him to come to Santa Fe. The letter, signed on behalf of Governor González by José Esquibel and Juan Vigil, reads, “Let us as compatriots and good Mexicans purify our native land so that we can live in peace and quiet.” González wrote to Tesuque Pueblo on 31 August 1837, stating, “Two Indians from the Pueblo of Tesuque must present themselves … so that they can accompany [leaders] from other Pueblos and march to … El Paso … and leave … for the Capital of the Republic with the objective of representing our rights.” As the rebellion took root, two principles guided its actions: governmental power resided in leaders at the village level, and Pueblo Indians were to be included in all governing councils. It was the most inclusive government New Mexico has ever seen—past or present.

The revolt underlined how increased isolation from Mexico City combined with "Mexico's declarations of political equality for all ethnic groups" increased Pueblo and Hispano cooperation in Mexican New Mexico—"the two groups ousted the governor and briefly established an Independent state—the Cantón—with an Indian serving as its governor.

When central rule was reestablished, it was done so on Armijo's lines (he became governor) and he ruled the province with even greater autonomy than any other time during the Mexican period. Armijo was to remain Governor of New Mexico through the Texan Santa Fe Expedition until 1844. He became Governor again in 1845 until he withdrew without a fight while New Mexico was taken over by the United States Army under the command of General Stephen W. Kearny in 1846.

As the situation within central Mexico fell further and further into confusion, New Mexico began to draw closer economically to the United States. This was epitomized in the growth in traffic and prominence of the Santa Fe Trail as a means of communication and trade. In the mid-1830s New Mexico began to function as a trading hub between the United States, central Mexico and Mexican California. Merchants making their way over the Great Plains would stop in Santa Fe, where they would meet with their counterparts from Los Angeles and Mexico City. The result was that as central Mexico fell into turmoil, New Mexico grew economically and trade ties strengthened with the United States.

In 1845 the governorship of Armijo was interrupted when the regime of Antonio López de Santa Anna replaced him as governor with political outsider Mariano Martínez de Lejanza. In the growing threat of war with the United States, the national center sought to bring the frontier under tight control as it is there that any war would be fought. Most New Mexicans distrusted the central government by now but that soon turned to fury when, one year into his reign, Martinez sparked a needless war with a neighboring Indigenous tribe out of incompetence and naïveté. To prevent revolution, Martinez was swiftly removed and Armijo reinstated, but any confidence the central government still enjoyed was completely destroyed.

The following year rumors arrived in New Mexico that the Mexican government was planning on selling the territory to the United States. There was so little trust in the central government by this point that instead of investigating these rumors (which were completely false) leading members of New Mexican society drafted a threat of secession to the government. This stated that if any such actions were taken then New Mexico would declare independence as La República Mexicana del Norte. It was not until invading American troops reached New Mexico in August 1846 that they learned of war with the United States.

=== Texian invasion ===
The Republic of Texas seceded from Mexico in 1836 and claimed but never controlled territory as far south and west as the Rio Grande. While most of the northwestern territory was then the Comancheria, it would have included Santa Fe and divided New Mexico. The only attempt to realize the claim was Texian President Mirabeau Lamar's Santa Fe Expedition, which failed spectacularly. The wagon train, supplied for a journey of about half the actual distance between Austin and Santa Fe, followed the wrong river, back-tracked, and arrived in New Mexico to find the Mexican governor restored and hostile. Surrendering peaceably upon a pledge to be allowed to return the way they came, the Texians found themselves bound at gunpoint and their execution put to a vote of the garrison. By one vote, they were spared and marched south to Chihuahua and then Mexico City.

== Mexican–American War ==
In 1846, during the Mexican–American War, American General Stephen W. Kearny marched down the Santa Fe Trail and entered Santa Fe without opposition to establish a joint civil and military government. Kearny's invasion force consisted of his army of 300 cavalry soldiers of the First Dragoons, about 1,600 Missouri volunteers in the First and Second Regiments of Fort Leavenworth, Missouri Mounted Cavalry, and the 500 man Mormon Battalion. Kearny appointed Charles Bent, a Santa Fe trail trader living in Taos, as acting civil governor. He then divided his forces into four commands: one, under Colonel Sterling Price, appointed military governor, was to occupy and maintain order in New Mexico with his approximately 800 troops; a second group under Colonel Alexander William Doniphan, with a little over 800 troops was ordered to capture El Paso, in the state of Chihuahua, Mexico and then join up with General Wool; the third, of about 300 dragoons mounted on mules, Kearny led under his command to California. The Mormon Battalion, mostly marching on foot under Lt. Col. Philip St. George Cooke, was directed to follow Kearny with wagons to establish a new southern route to California.

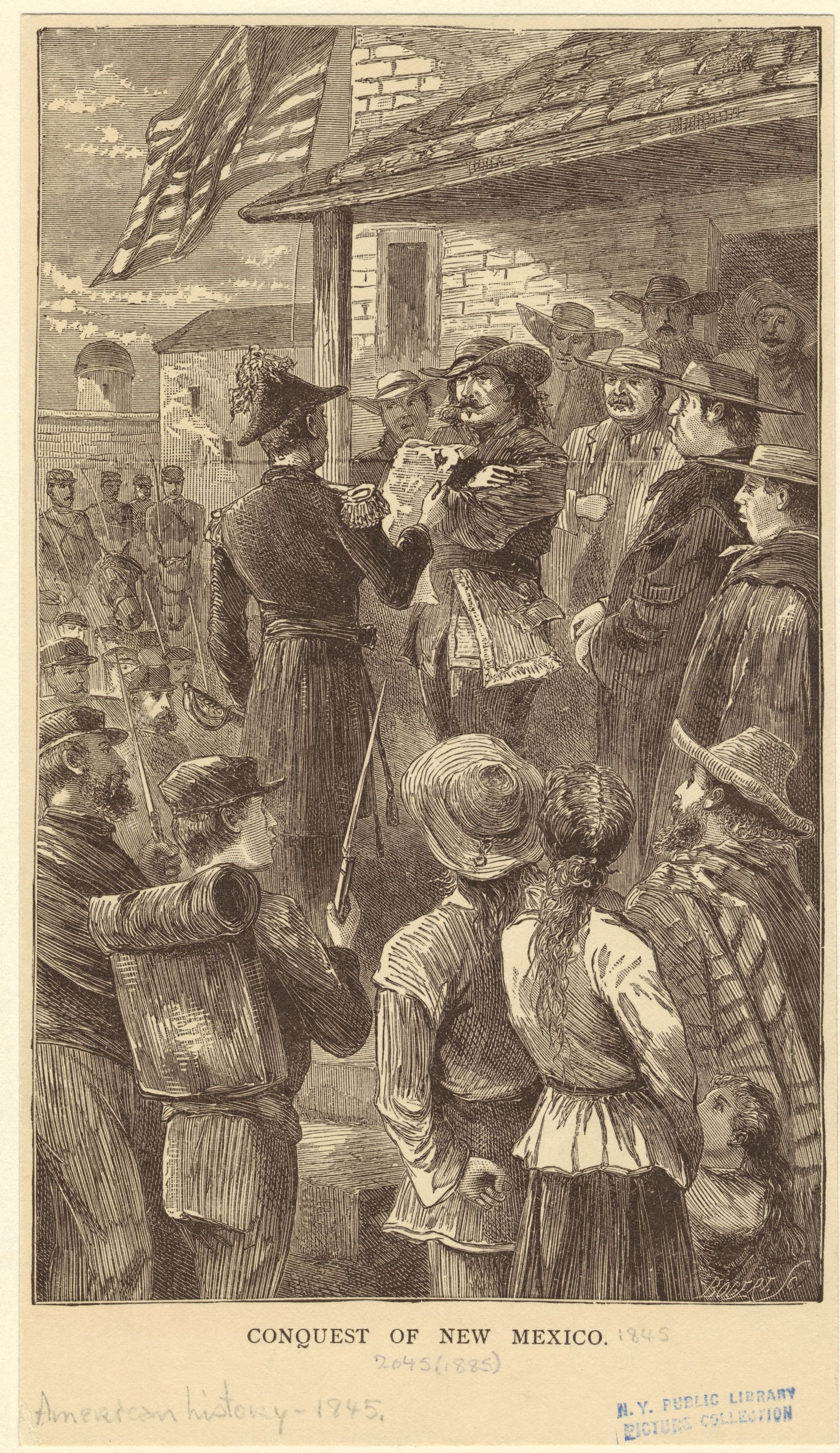
Gen. Kearny's annexation of New Mexico, August 15, 1846

Kearny protected citizens in the new US territories under a form of martial law called the Kearny Code; it was essentially Kearny and the U.S. Army's promise that the US would respect existing religious and legal claims, and maintain law and order. The Kearny Code became one of the bases of New Mexico's legal code during its territorial period, which was one of the longest in United States history. Many of the provisions remain substantially unchanged today.

Kearny's arrival in New Mexico was almost without conflict; the governor surrendered without battle. The Mexican authorities took the money they could find and retreated south into Mexico. Nonetheless, the U.S. occupation was resented by the New Mexicans. Provisional governor Charles Bent, a longtime resident of New Mexico, implored U.S. army officers to "respect the rights of the inhabitants" and predicted "serious consequences" if measures were not taken to prevent abuses.

On January 19, 1847, in the Taos Revolt, rebels attacked and killed acting Governor Bent and about ten other American officials. The wives of Bent and Kit Carson, however, managed to escape. Reacting quickly, a U.S. detachment under Colonel Sterling Price marched on Taos and attacked. The rebels retreated to a thick-walled adobe church. U.S. forces breached a wall and directed concentrated cannon fire into the church. About 150 of the rebels were killed, and 400 captured, following close fighting. During one trial, six rebels were arraigned and tried, of whom five were convicted of murder and one of treason. All six were hanged in April, 1847. Additional executions followed to total at least 28.

Price fought three more engagements with the rebels, which included many Pueblo Indians, who wanted to push the Americans from the territory. By mid-February he had the revolt well under control. President James K. Polk promoted Price to a brevet rank of Brigadier General for his service. Total fatalities amounted to more than 300 New Mexican native rebels and about 30 Anglos, as non-Latino whites are commonly called in the southwest to this day.

== U.S. Territory ==
Proposals for Texas northwestern boundary

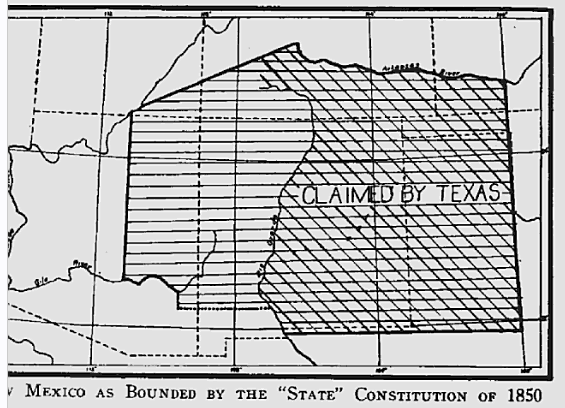
New Mexico proposed boundary before Compromise of 1850

Under the Treaty of Guadalupe Hidalgo of 1848, Mexico ceded much of its mostly unsettled northern holdings, today known as the American Southwest and California, to the United States of America in exchange for an end to hostilities, and the American evacuation of Mexico City and many other areas under its control. Under this treaty, Mexico recognized Texas as a part of the United States. Mexico also received $15 million cash, plus the assumption of debts of Mexico to American citizens.

The Congressional Compromise of 1850 halted a bid for statehood under a proposed antislavery constitution. Texas transferred eastern New Mexico to the federal government, settling a lengthy boundary dispute. Under the compromise, the American government established the New Mexico Territory on September 9, 1850. The territory, which included all of Arizona, New Mexico and parts of Colorado, officially established its capital at Santa Fe in 1851. The U.S. territorial New Mexico census of 1850 found 61,547 people living in all the territory of New Mexico. The people of New Mexico would determine whether to permit slavery under a proposed constitution at statehood, but the status of slavery during the territorial period provoked considerable debate. The granting of statehood was up to a Congress sharply divided on the slavery issue. Some (including Stephen A. Douglas) maintained that the territory could not restrict slavery, as under the earlier Missouri Compromise, while others (including Abraham Lincoln) insisted that older Mexican legal traditions, which forbade slavery, took precedence. Regardless of its official status, black slavery was rarely seen in New Mexico although Indigenous slavery was common.

The United States acquired from Mexico the southwestern boot heel of the state in the mostly desert Gadsden Purchase of 1853. This purchase was desired when it was found that a much easier route for a proposed transcontinental railroad was located slightly south of the Gila River. The ever-present Santa Anna was in power in 1853 and needed the money from the Gadsden Purchase to pay the Mexican Army. The Southern Pacific built the second transcontinental railroad though this purchased land in 1881.

In the United States House of Representatives the Committee of Thirty-Three on January 14, 1861, reported that it had reached majority agreement on a constitutional amendment to protect slavery where it existed and the immediate admission of New Mexico Territory as a slave state. This latter proposal resulted in a de facto extension of the Missouri Compromise line for all existing territories below the line.

After the Peace Conference of 1861, a bill for New Mexico statehood was tabled by a vote of 115 to 71 with opposition coming from both Southerners and Republicans.

=== Media ===
The first newspaper in New Mexico was El Crepusculo de la Libertad ("The Dawn of Liberty"), a Spanish-language paper founded in 1834 at Taos. The Santa Fe Republican, founded in 1847, was the first English-language newspaper. By 2000, the state had 18 daily newspapers, 13 Sunday newspapers, and 25 weekly newspapers. Today's daily papers include the Albuquerque Journal, the Santa Fe New Mexican (founded in 1849), the Las Cruces Sun-News, the Roswell Record, the Farmington Daily Times, and the Deming Headlight.

The most widely broadcast radio station since its founding in 1922 has been KKOB (AM) in Albuquerque. With 50,000 watts of transmitter power on a clear channel it reaches audiences in most of New Mexico and parts of neighboring states. There are at least five television stations, based in Albuquerque, representing ABC, NBC, CBS, PBS, and Fox.

== U.S. Civil War ==
During the American Civil War, Confederate troops from Texas commanded by Gen. Henry Sibley briefly occupied southern New Mexico in July 1861, pushing up the Rio Grande valley as far as Santa Fe by February 1862. Defeated in the Battle of Glorieta Pass, they were forced to withdraw south. Union troops from California under Gen. James Henry Carleton re-captured the territory in August 1862. As Union troops were withdrawn to fight elsewhere, Kit Carson helped to organize and command the 1st New Mexican Volunteers to engage in campaigns against the Apache, Navajo, and Comanche in New Mexico and Texas as well as participating in the Battle of Valverde against the Confederates. Confederate troops withdrew after the Battle of Glorieta Pass where Union regulars, Colorado Volunteers (The Pikes Peakers), and New Mexican Volunteers defeated them. The Arizona Territory was split off as a separate territory in 1863.

After the Civil War, Congress passed the Peonage Act of 1867, aiming to abolish the historical system of peonage that had existed in New Mexico.

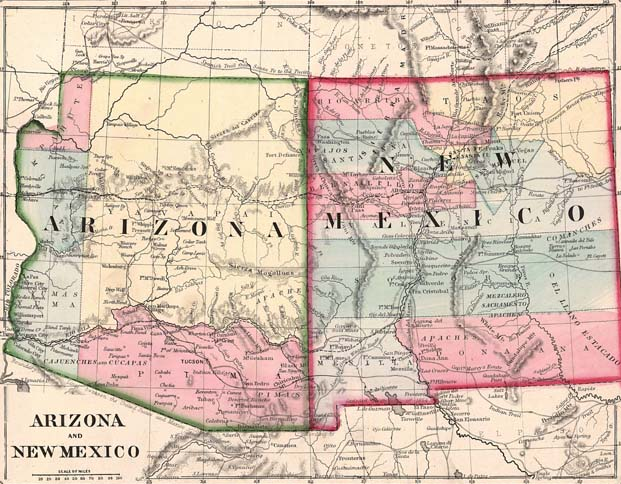
1867 map

== Postwar U.S. territorial period ==
=== Indigenous Americans ===
Centuries of continued conflict with the Apache and the Navajo continued to plague New Mexico. In 1864, the U.S. Army trapped and captured the main Navajo forces, forcing them onto a small reservation in eastern New Mexico in what is called the Long Walk of the Navajo, also called the Long Walk to Bosque Redondo. This put an end to their livestock raids on New Mexican farms, ranches, and pueblos. After several years of severe hardships, during which many Navajos died, they were allowed in 1868 to return to most of their lands. Sporadic Apache small-scale raiding continued until Apache chief Geronimo finally was captured and imprisoned in 1886.

After the Civil War, the Army set up a chain of forts to protect the people and the caravans of commerce. Most tribes were relocated on reservations near the forts, where they were given food and supplies by the federal government. Often supplies and annuities were late, or food spoiled.

=== Land disputes and the legal system ===
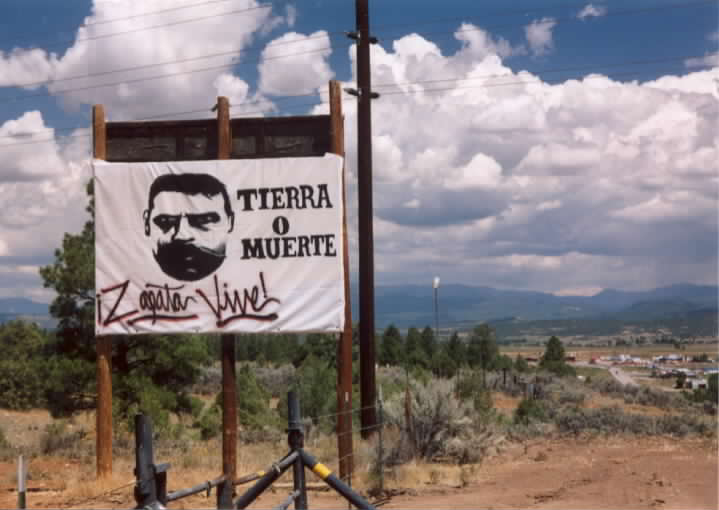
Tierra O Muerte – Land or Death. Legal issues about ownership of millions of acres in land grants date from the Mexican war to the present.

In the first half of the 19th century, Mexico set up a judicial system for its northernmost districts, in present-day New Mexico and California. There were no professionally trained lawyers or judges. Instead, there were numerous low-ranking legal roles such as notario, escribano, asesor, auditor de Querra, justicia mayor, procurador, and juez receptor. With the annexation by the United States in 1848, Congress set up entirely new territorial legal systems, one that used the English language and American laws, forms, and procedures. Practically all the lawyers and judges were new arrivals from the United States, as there was no place in the new system for the old Hispanic roles. The Hispanic residents of New Mexico, unfamiliar with the U.S. legal system were at a disadvantage as Anglo-Americans gained ownership of much of the land.

At the time of the U.S. conquest much New Mexican land was owned by recipients, both individuals and communities, of land grants awarded by the Spanish and Mexican governments. Many of the grants contained large acreages of common land for the use of all the residents on the grant. In the treaty of Guadalupe Hidalgo the U.S. promised to protect the ownership rights of the property of residents. Ownership of the millions of acres in the land grants was a major political and legal dispute in New Mexico for the remainder of the 19th century. Through legal machinations, speculators, mostly Anglo lawyers and politicians collectively called the Santa Fe Ring, gained ownership of the great majority of the common land in the grants, preventing access and use of the land to the Hispanic settlers. In the 20th century, much of the grant land ended up in the public domain of the United States, especially in the National Forests. Disputes over ownership and access to former grant land have continued into the 21st century.

A number of violent movements and incidents punctuated the acquisition of land by the Anglo Americans. The Colfax County War from 1873 to 1888 featured disputes, including several murders and armed confrontations, between settlers, Anglo and Hispanic, within the borders of the Maxwell Land Grant, owned by foreign investors. The settlers were called squatters by the company which evicted some settlers and eventually settled disputes with others. In San Miguel County, the night-riding Las Gorras Blancas (The White Hats) were a response to the land grabs of the Anglo Americans and the Santa Fe Ring. From 1889 to 1891, Hispanic night raiders cut fences and destroyed the property of Anglo ranchers and residents. The incidents ceased when several leaders of the Gorras Blancas were elected to the New Mexico legislature where they attempted, but failed, to pass populist legislation. From 1878 to 1881, the Lincoln County War (famous for the participation of Billy the Kid), was a violent dispute, partially concerning land, between two factions of Anglo businessmen and ranchers.

In Rio Arriba County, the sale by investment companies of former common land led to violence and legal disputes. From 1919 to 1924 night riders associated with a shadowy organization called La Mano Negra ("Black Hand") cut fences, burned barns, and threatened the new owners of the Tierra Amarilla Land Grant. Fence cutting continued sporadically until the 1960s. In 1967, a group headed by Reies Tijerina occupied the Rio Arriba Country Courthouse to protest the acquisition of grant land by non-resident investors. After two people were wounded, the protesters were evicted and Tijerina was arrested. The FBI characterized the event as "domestic terrorism."

=== Gilded Age ===
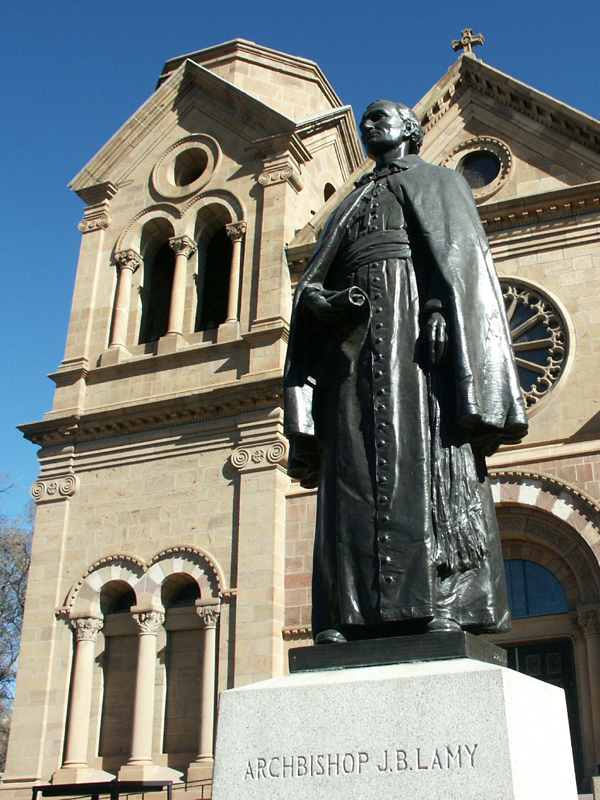
Bronze statue of Archbishop Lamy in front of St. Francis Cathedral

In 1851 the Vatican appointed Jean-Baptiste Lamy (1814–1888), a French cleric, as bishop of the diocese of Santa Fe. There were only nine priests at first; Lamy brought in many more. In 1875 it was upgraded to the status of archdiocese, with supervision over Catholic affairs in New Mexico and Arizona. Lamy had St. Francis Cathedral built in a French style; the work was conducted between 1869 and 1886.

To provide the forts and reservations with food, the federal government contracted for thousands of head of cattle, and Texas cattlemen began entering New Mexico with their herds. Rancher Charles Goodnight blazed the first cattle trail through New Mexico in 1866, extending from the Pecos River northward into Colorado and Wyoming. Over it more than 250,000 head of cattle trailed to market. John Chisum also brought his herds up the Pecos. As employer of the desperado Billy the Kid, he figured prominently in the Lincoln County War of 1878–1880. This was one of the many struggles between cattle herders and territorial officials, among rival cattle barons, and between sheep ranchers and cattle ranchers during this period. The Butterfield Trail, the longest of the cattle trails, had its first important stop in New Mexico at Fort Fillmore. It began operations in 1858 and was superseded by railroad operations in 1881.

The Santa Fe Railroad reached New Mexico in 1878, with the first locomotive crossing Raton Pass that December. It reached Lamy, New Mexico, 16 miles (26 km) from Santa Fe in 1879 and Santa Fe itself in 1880, and Deming in 1881, thereby replacing the storied Santa Fe Trail as a way to ship cattle to market. The new town of Albuquerque, platted in 1880 as the Santa Fe Railroad extended westward, quickly enveloped the old town. The rival Southern Pacific was completed between the Rio Grande valley and the Arizona border in 1881.

From 1880 to 1910 the territory grew rapidly. With the coming of the railroad, many homesteaders moved to New Mexico. In 1886 the New Mexico Education Association of school teachers was organized; in 1889 small state colleges were established at Albuquerque, Las Cruces, and Socorro; and in 1891 the first effective public school law was passed. An irrigation project in the Pecos River valley in 1889 marked the first of many such projects to irrigate farms in the dry state. Discovery of artesian waters at Roswell in 1890 gave both farming and mining a boost. The power of the cattle barons faded as much land was fenced in at the expense of the open range. The cattle ranchers and sheep ranchers also learned to tolerate one other, and both the cattle and sheep industries expanded. Mining became even more important, especially gold and silver. Coal mining developed during the 1890s, primarily to supply the railroads, and oil was discovered in Eddy County in 1909. The population of New Mexico reached 195,000 in 1910.

== Statehood ==
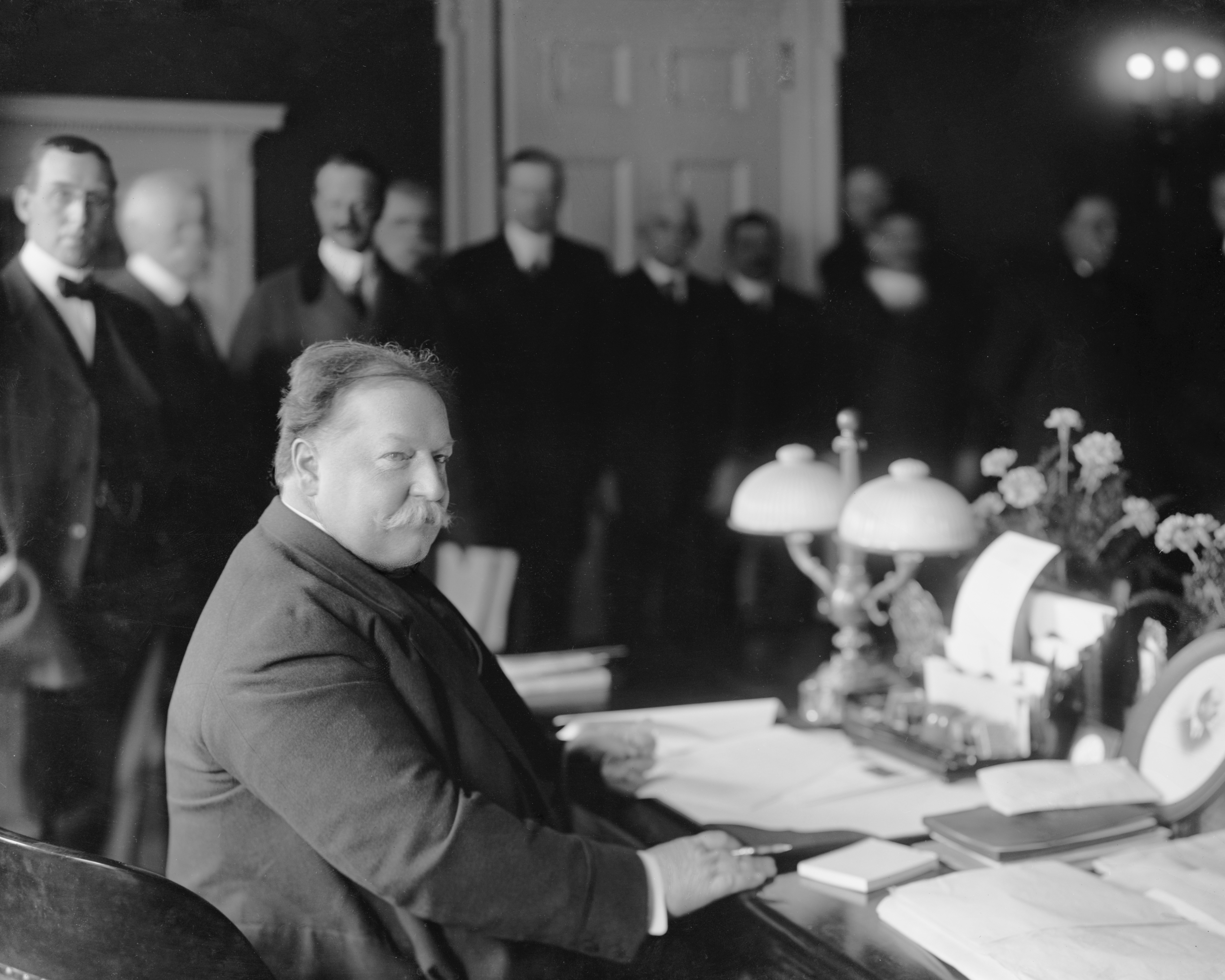
President William Howard Taft at his desk in the Oval Office, signing the statehood bill for New Mexico on January 6, 1912.

On January 6, 1912, after years of debate on whether the population of New Mexico was fully assimilated into American culture, or too immersed in corruption, President William Howard Taft twisted arms in Congress and it approved admission of New Mexico as the 47th state of the Union. The admission of neighboring Arizona on February 14, 1912, completed the contiguous 48 states. Thousands of Mexicans fled north during the extremely bloody civil war that broke out in Mexico in 1911. In 1916 Mexican military leader Pancho Villa led an invasion across the border into Columbus, New Mexico, where they burned some homes and killed several Americans.

New Mexico contributed some 17,000 soldiers to the armed services during World War I. Thousands more from the state fought for the Allies during World War II.

=== Artists and writers ===
When the mainline of the railroad bypassed Santa Fe, the city lost businesses and population. In the 20th century, American and British artists and writers, and retirees were attracted to the cultural richness of the area, the beauty of the landscapes, and dry warm climate. Local leaders took the opportunity to promote the city's heritage making it a tourist attraction. The city sponsored bold architectural restoration projects and erected new buildings according to traditional techniques and styles, thus creating the "Santa Fe style." Edgar L. Hewett, founder and first director of the School of American Research and the Museum of New Mexico in Santa Fe, was a leading promoter. He began the Santa Fe Fiesta in 1919 and the Southwest Indian Fair in 1922 (now known as the Indian Market). When he tried to attract a summer program for Texas women, many artists rebelled saying the city should not promote artificial tourism at the expense of its artistic culture. The writers and artists formed the Old Santa Fe Association and defeated the plan. The old "mud city" - which short-sighted modernizers laughed at for its adobe houses - was transformed into a city proud of its peculiarities and its blend of tradition and modernity.

=== Nuevomexicanos ===
In the late 19th and early 20th centuries, the Anglos tried to regulate the Hispanics living in New Mexico to second-class social status, due to xenophobia and prejudice. Some of these Anglos were ethnocentric, deprecating Hispanic/Mexican culture and disputing the rights of the original inhabitants. Richard Nostrand claims that this treatment caused the Hispanics to construct a "Spanish American" identity in response to show allegiance to the US, in an early instance of expressing being American through ethnic identity, to avoid being labeled as "Mexican", and to distinguish themselves from recent Mexican immigrants.

World War I gave the Hispanics the opportunity to demonstrate American citizenship by participating in the war effort. Like the "new immigrants" in northeastern cities, who also constructed dual identities, members of the Nuevomexicano middle class exuberantly participated in the war effort. They melded images of their heritage with patriotic symbols of America, especially in the Spanish-language press. Nuevomexicano politicians and community leaders recruited the rural masses into the war cause overseas and on the home front, including the struggle for woman suffrage. Support from New Mexico's Anglo establishment aided their efforts. Their wartime contributions improved the conditions of minority citizenship for Nuevomexicanos but did not eliminate social inequality. For example, no Hispanics —not even the son of a politician— were allowed to be a member of a fraternity at the state university.

The Anglos and Hispanics cooperated because both prosperous and poor Hispanics could vote and they outnumbered the Anglos. Around 1920, the term "Spanish-American" replaced "Mexican" in polite society and in political debate. The new term served both the interests of both groups. For Spanish speakers, it evoked Spain, not Mexico, recalling images of a romantic colonial past and suggesting a future of equality in Anglo-dominated America. For Anglos, on the other hand, it was a useful term that upgraded the state's image, for the old image as a "Mexican" land suggested the violence and disorder associated with that country's civil war in the early 20th century. This had discouraged capital investment and set back the statehood campaign. The new term gave the impression that "Spanish Americans" belonged to a true "American" political culture, making the established order appear all the more democratic.

=== New arrivals ===
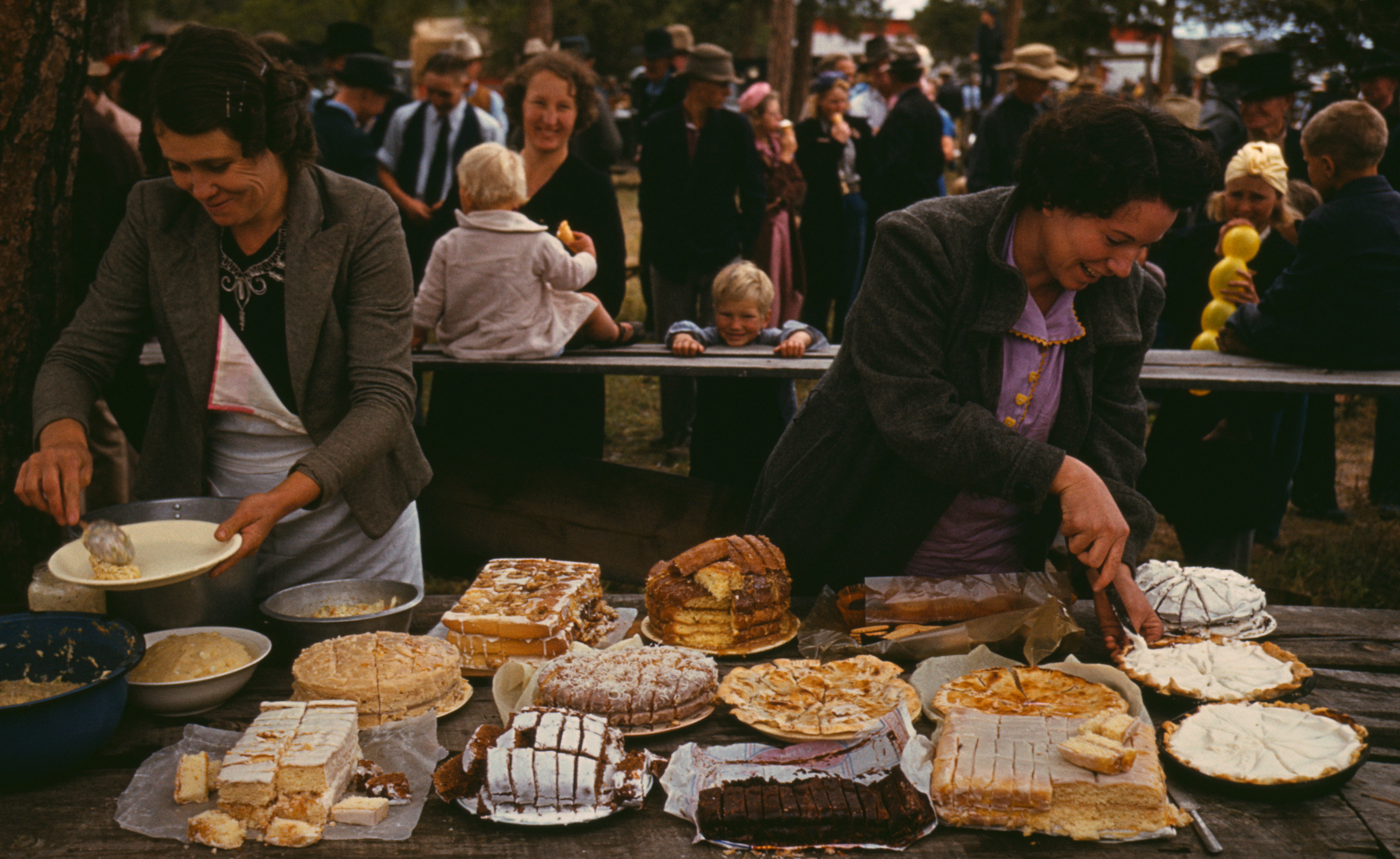
Serving food in Pie Town, New Mexico, 1940

In the 20th century immigrants and migrants brought new skills, outlooks, traditions and values, modernizing the highly traditional culture of the state. They included Midwestern farmers who tried to cultivate humid-area crops to the desert climate, Texas oilmen, tuberculosis patients who sought healing in the dry air (before an appropriate antibiotic was discovered), artists who made Taos a national cultural center, New Dealers who sought to modernize the state as fast as possible and improve infrastructure, soldiers and airmen from all over who came for training at the many military bases, noted scientists who came to Los Alamos to build a super weapon, and stayed on, and retirees from colder climes. They brought money and new ideas. The state residents gradually adopted more of a standard national culture, losing some of its unique qualities.

=== Women's suffrage ===
The suffrage movement in the state worked hard to get women the vote but were stymied by the conservatism of politicians and the Catholic Church. New Mexico's legislature was one of the last in 1920 to ratify the Nineteenth Amendment to the United States Constitution. After it passed, there was quickly a dramatic increase in political participation by both Anglo and Hispanic women, as well as strong mobilization efforts by the major parties to gain the support of the female voters.

=== World War II ===
New Mexico proportionately suffered the loss of more servicemen than any other state in the nation. The state led in the national war bond drive and had fifty federal installations, including glider and bombardier training schools. The state rapidly modernized during the war, as 65,000 young men (and 700 young women) joined the services, where they received a wide range of technical training and saw the outside world, many for the first time. Federal spending brought wartime prosperity, along with high wages, jobs for everyone, rationing and shortages. Federal facilities have continued to be major contributors to the state's economy in the postwar years.

The top secret remote Los Alamos Research Center was developed in the mountains of New Mexico as a research facility, opening in 1943 for the purpose of developing the world's first atomic bomb. Teams of scientists and engineers were recruited to work on this project. The first test at Trinity Site in the desert of the Alamogordo Bombing and Gunnery Range, now known as White Sands Missile Range, 28 miles southeast of San Antonio, New Mexico, on July 16, 1945, ushered in the atomic age. New Mexico had become a center of world-class science. High-altitude balloon experiments from Holloman Air Force Base caused debris found near Roswell, New Mexico (The Roswell Incident) in 1947. This reputedly led to the persistent (but unproven) claims by a few individuals that the government had captured and concealed extraterrestrial corpses and equipment.

Albuquerque expanded rapidly after the war. The state quickly emerged as a leader in nuclear, solar, and geothermal energy research and development. The Sandia National Laboratories, founded in 1949, carried out nuclear research and special weapons development at Kirtland Air Force Base just south of Albuquerque.

=== Environmentalism ===
Since the late 19th century, New Mexico and other arid Western states have sought to assert sovereign control over water allocation policies within their boundaries. In the 1990s the legislature debated H.R. 128, the proposed State Water Sovereignty Protection Act. Since the passage of the Newlands Act in 1902, Western states have benefited from federal water projects. In spite of these projects, water allocation remained a politically charged issue throughout the 20th century. Most states have sought to limit federal control over water distribution, preferring instead to allocate water under the discredited doctrine of prior appropriation.

As a state dependent on both smokestack industry and scenic tourism, New Mexico was at the center of the debates over clean air legislation, particularly the Clean Air Act of 1967 and its amendments in 1970 and 1977. The Kennecott Copper Corporation, which operated a large smelter at Hurley, New Mexico, generating as a byproduct thick clouds of air pollution, led the opposition to the environmentalists, represented by the New Mexico Citizens for Clean Air and Water. Eventually the company was forced to comply with fairly strict federal standards. They often delayed the compliance process for years by threatening economic repercussions, such as plant closings and unemployment, if forced to comply with standards.

=== COVID-19 pandemic ===
The COVID-19 pandemic was confirmed to have reached the U.S. state of New Mexico on March 11, 2020. On December 23, 2020, the New Mexico Department of Health reported 1,174 new COVID-19 cases and 40 deaths, bringing the cumulative statewide totals to 133,242 cases and 2,243 deaths since the start of the pandemic. During the last quarter of 2020, COVID-19 hospitalizations in New Mexico increased, reaching a peak of 947 hospitalizations on December 3.

The most populous counties in the state have seen the largest number of infections, but by mid-April, the northwest counties of McKinley and San Juan became the most infected areas in the state, with Sandoval County also seeing a high infection rate. All of these counties have large Native American populations. According to the state's data dashboard, American Indians had nearly 58 percent of the statewide infection rates as of May 15. On April 25, McKinley County had the highest total number of cases while San Juan County had the highest number of deaths by April 26. However, by the end of July, Hispanics/Latinos had a plurality of cases. The portion of cases among American Indians continued to decline, and by mid February 2021 was below that of whites.

== See also ==
- Governor of New Mexico
  - List of governors of New Mexico
  - List of Mexican governors of New Mexico
  - List of Spanish governors of New Mexico
- History of New Mexico
  - History of slavery in New Mexico
  - List of counties in New Mexico
  - List of ghost towns in New Mexico
  - List of municipalities in New Mexico
  - Supply of Franciscan missions in New Mexico
- Indigenous peoples of the North American Southwest
- Southwestern archaeology
- Territorial evolution of New Mexico
  - Santa Fe de Nuevo México
  - U.S. provisional government of New Mexico
  - Territory of New Mexico
  - State of New Mexico
- Timeline of New Mexico history
  - Timeline of Albuquerque, New Mexico
