= Francisco Hosta =

Civil governor of Jemez Pueblo in 1849

Francisco Hosta was the civil governor of Jemez Pueblo in 1849. He acted as a guide for several archeological expeditions to the Ancestral Puebloan ruins in Chaco Canyon, including the Simpson group in 1849, one led by Dr. Oscar Lowe in 1874, and in 1877 he guided photographer William Henry Jackson, who named Hosta Butte in his honor. He might have also guided José Antonio Vizcarra during his 1823 campaign against the Navajo people, during which Vizcarra re-discovered Chaco Canyon.
