= Bartolomé Baca =

Governor of New Mexico (1823–1825)

4th Mexican Governor of New Mexico
- In office August 1823 – September 1825
- Preceded by: José Antonio Vizcarra
- Succeeded by: Antonio Narbona

Personal details
- Born: c. 1767 Belén, Santa Fe de Nuevo México, New Spain
- Died: 30 April 1834 Tomé, Santa Fe de Nuevo México, First Mexican Republic (now Valencia County, New Mexico, U.S.)
- Occupation: Landowner
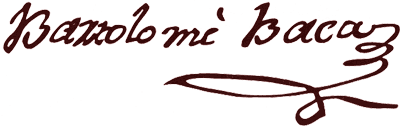
- Signature

Bartolomé Baca (c. 1767 – 30 April 1834) was Governor of the territory of Santa Fe de Nuevo México (New Mexico) from August 1823 until September 1825. His very large landholdings were later the subject of disputes that eventually went to the Supreme Court of the United States.

== Biography ==
Bartolomé Baca was born around 1767 in Belén, Nuevo México. He came from a Spanish aristocratic family, and inherited or acquired great personal wealth. He married María de la Luz Chávez, daughter of Vicente Chávez and Juana Aragón, on 2 May 1790 in San Felipe de Neri, Albuquerque, New Mexico. Baca was made captain of Albuquerque's volunteer militia when it was organized in 1808, carrying out his duties "with honor and valor".

Bartolomé Baca established himself at Torreon, overlooking the Estancia Valley, where he obtained a grant of land from the Spanish Governor Facundo Melgares. The land was described as bounded "on the north, by the Monte del Cibolo; on the east, by the Estancia Springs; on the south, by the Ojo del Cuebro; and on the west by the Abo mountains." The area of the grant was about 1,282,000 acres (519,000 ha). Baca took possession of this land in July 1819. Baca lived at San Fernando, but built a large ranch house at Estancia Springs for his three sons, who looked after the ranch. They grazed 40,000 sheep, 900 cattle and 300 mares on the grant. The ranch was profitable until 1833, when Navajo raids increased, killing the shepherds and stealing the livestock, and leading to the ranch eventually being abandoned.

Bartolomé Baca was Governor and Captain-General of New Mexico from 1823 to 1825. Bartolomé Baca died on 30 Apr 1834 in Tomé, Nuevo México.

== Governor of New Mexico ==
Baca was governor of the province of New Mexico from August 1823 to September 1825. When Captain Baca became géfe político, equivalent to Governor, in 1823, the Mexican inhabitants of the territory suffered from constant Apache raids. Baca was also géfe militar, and commanded the garrison at Santa Fe, but this had just 119 men and officers. In 1824 the cost of maintaining this company was $35,488. In addition, the settlers maintained a militia at their own expense. Baca used a combination of bribes and treaties to reduce problems with the Navajos and Apaches, and this was generally but by no means always successful.

In July 1824 Baca invited all the principal Comanche chiefs to meet with him on the Canadian River. Only a few turned up, and the others could not be found, much to Baca's displeasure. In January 1825 there were Comanche raids near San Elizario and El Paso. Apparently the main Comanche chief obeyed Baca's request to come to Santa Fe on this occasion, but Baca reported that the Comanches were "insolent as they have become accustomed to be."

In 1825 Baca and New Mexico's legislature, the Diputación Provincial, opened the land of the Pueblo Indians of Pecos to settlement by Mexicans wherever the land was not cultivated.

Baca issued licenses to U.S. citizens to trap beaver on condition that they hired Mexicans and taught them the skills required. Baca was interested in developing trade with the United States. In the spring of 1824 Baca sent a courier to Council Bluffs, announcing that New Mexico planned to march 1,500 men to the Missouri River to pacify the Indian trobes and open the route for trade, arriving on or before 10 June 1824. In 1825 he commissioned Don Manuel Escudéro, the first Mexican to take a caravan along the Santa Fe Trail, to visit the United States to discuss commerce. Escudéro, who was a member of the Chihuahua provincial assembly, was to ask for greater protection for Mexican traders. He was robbed by Osages on the left bank of the Arkansas River, for which he gained compensation by the United States.

== Bartolomé Baca land grant ==
The Mexican government made grants from the Bartolomé Baca grant to other settlers in 1829, 1834 and 1841. The United States occupied the territory in 1846, introducing a new land tenure system, while original records of sale were lost. This was to lead to long-running legal disputes over ownership, eventually going to the Supreme Court of the United States in 1897, which found that there was no proof Baca had ever owned the land.
