= Hosta Butte =

Coordinates: 35.587°N 108.193°W

Hosta Butte is an ancestral site southwest of Chaco Culture National Historical Park, New Mexico. Along with Gobernador Knob and Huérfano Mountain, it forms part of the Dinétah, considered to be the birthplace of early Navajo culture. The mountain, with an elevation of 8,622 feet (2,628 m), is in close proximity to Crownpoint, New Mexico. Due to its prominence in the cosmography of Native tribes in the area, the mountain contains a number of small shrines. In 1877, photographer William Henry Jackson named the butte in honor of Francisco Hosta, who guided him to the Ancestral Puebloan ruins in Chaco Canyon.

Uranium mining is exploited in the area, over some 3,020 acres, and forms part of the Grants Uranium Belt.
