= Antonio Narbona =

Governor of New Mexico (1825–1827)

5th Mexican Governor of New Mexico
- In office September 1825 – May 1827
- Preceded by: Bartolomé Baca
- Succeeded by: Manuel Armijo

Personal details
- Born: 1773 Mobile, British Florida (now Mobile, Alabama, U.S.)
- Died: 20 March 1830 (aged 56–57) Arizpe, Estado de Occidente, First Mexican Republic (now Sonora, Mexico)
- Profession: Soldier
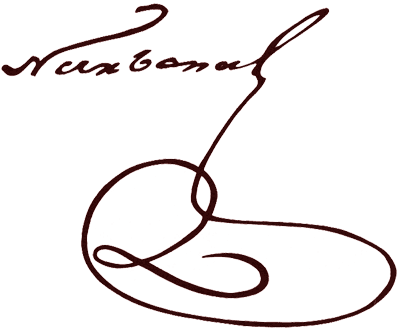
- Signature

Antonio Pascual Narbona (1773 – 20 March 1830) was a Spanish soldier from Mobile, British Florida now in Alabama, who fought Native American people in the northern part of New Spain (now the southwestern United States) around the turn of the nineteenth century. He supported the independence of Mexico from Spain in 1821. He was Governor of the territory of Santa Fe de Nuevo México (New Mexico) from September 1825 until 1827.

== Early career ==
Antonio Narbona was a Criollo, or locally born person of Spanish ancestry, born at Mobile in British Florida, now Alabama. Spanish rule returned to Florida by the time he was about 10 with the end of the American Revolutionary War.

He arrived in Sonora in 1789 as a cadet in the Santa Cruz Company, sponsored by the commandant Brigadier Enrique Grimarest, who was his brother in law. He was promoted to ensign of the Fronteras garrison in Sonora on 27 January 1793.

Lieutenant Antonio Narbona came to New Mexico from Chihuahua province in January 1805 at the head of a troop of soldiers sent to respond to a Navajo raid. The Navajos had made attacks on the Spanish military post at Cebolletta, and on nearby settlements. They were trying to recover their grazing land at the foot of Mount Taylor, their sacred Turquoise Mountain. Narbona's force travelled north from Zuni Pueblo, passing through the Narbona Pass to attack the Canyon de Chelly. The Narbona expedition killed over 115 Navajo and took 33 women and children as slaves. A 19th-century pictograph in the Canyon de Chelly National Monument represents the force.

== Sonora and Sinaloa ==
In 1809 Narbona was promoted to captain at Fronteras. He became commander of the Tucson presidio. In 1815 he handed over command of Tucson to Lt Col. Manual Ignacio Arvisu. Fearing loss of protection, many of the settlers moved away. He was later given military command of Sonora. In 1819 he signed a peace treaty with the Apaches, who were in conflict with the settlers in Presidio. In 1820 he was promoted to Lieutenant Colonel and was made Adjutant Inspector of the Comandancy General.

Narbona was given command of the troops at Arizpe, leading them in support of the Plan of Iguala and Mexican independence from Spain. He and Simón Elías Gonzalez secured Arizpe and northeastern Sonora, then marched to Guaymas on the Gulf of California to put down opposition to the independence movement. On 6 September 1821 he led the chiefs and officers of the garrison who swore independence in accordance with the basis of the Plan of Iguala. As the top political leader refused to take the same attitude, he was forced to resign and Lieutenant Colonel Narbona took over command of the army in the provinces of Sonora and Sinaloa. Days later he led his forces in the direction of Guaymas, where the population led by father Pedro Leyva had refused to accept the plan, and forced them to submit.

Narbona was elected second member of the Provincial Government of Sonora and Sinaloa, and on 23 July 1822 was appointed political leader of the provinces of Sonora and Sinaloa. During his administration the two provinces were separated for the first time. In the first half of 1823, he put down an uprising of the Opata and Yaqui. In August he gave the political and military command to Colonel Urrea. Promoted to colonel in April 1825, he led the forces that helped subdue the Yaqui led by Juan Banderas. He then handed over the force to the command of General Figueroa.

== Governor of New Mexico ==
Colonel Antonio Narbona was appointed géfe político (equivalent to governor) of New Mexico from September 1825 to May 1827. In 1825 the United States President James Monroe sent three representatives to Santa Fe, New Mexico, to negotiate a "road between nations" and to establish trade routes and define hunting rights. George Champlin Sibley met with Governor Narbona and established cordial relations. As governor, he issued beaver-trapping licenses to foreigners from the United States on condition that they took Mexicans with them and taught them the skills. However, in 1826 he sent a report to the national government in which he expressed concern about the number of Anglo-Americans who had moved into Taos and Santa Fe. These did not just include merchants but also tradesmen such as carpenters, smiths, cabinet makers, painters and hat makers.

He died in Arizpe on March 20, 1830. His namesake son, who was also military and attained the rank of colonel, was killed by Apaches in Cuquiárachi on the threshold of his house on December 23, 1848.
