= List of Mexican governors of New Mexico =

Mexican Governor of New Mexico
- Flag of the Centralist Republic of Mexico
- Residence: Santa Fe
- Appointer: Emperor of Mexico (1822–1823) President of Mexico (1823–1846)
- Precursor: Spanish governors of New Mexico
- Formation: January 1822; 204 years ago
- First holder: Facundo Melgares
- Final holder: Pablo Montoya
- Abolished: February 1847; 179 years ago
- Succession: Military governors of New Mexico (U.S.)

Mexican governors of New Mexico were the political chief executives of the province and later territory of Santa Fe de Nuevo México (New Mexico) between 1822, when Mexico gained independence from Spain, and 1846, when the United States occupied the territory following the Mexican–American War. It was succeeded as a territory of the United States, and as the U.S. state of New Mexico.

== History ==
The Centralist Republic with the separatist movements generated by the dissolution of the Federal Republic. Area in rebellion Area claimed by the Republics of Texas and the Rio Grande Area not in rebellion

In January 1822 the last Governor under the Spanish regime, Facundo Melgares, lost the title of governor and was now called géfe político (political chief) and géfe militar (military chief). Melgáres left the political office on July 5, 1822, and Francisco Xavier Chavez took his place, holding office for just five months, when he was succeeded in November 1822 by Colonel José Antonio Vizcarra. Vizcarra had succeeded Melgáres as géfe militar in October 1822. In September 1823, a retired Militia Captain named Don Bartolomé Baca was appointed géfe politico. Eleven more men were to serve as either géfe político or governor before the occupation of New Mexico in 1846 by the United States Army during the Mexican–American War.

New Mexico was at first a province of the Estado interno del Norte, with capital in Chihuahua. As of July 6, 1824, New Mexico was made a separate territory, with El Paso del Norte (now called Ciudad Juárez) transferred from New Mexico to the State of Chihuahua.

== Political chiefs and governors ==
The political chiefs (géfe políticos) or governors were:

Start	End	Name	Notes
January 1822	July 1822	Facundo Melgares	
July 1822	November 1822	Francisco Xavier Chávez	
November 1822	September 1823	José Antonio Vizcarra	
August 1823	September 1825	Bartolomé Baca	
September 1825	May 1827	Antonio Narbona	
1827	1829	Manuel Armijo	First term
September 1829	1832	José Antonio Chaves	
1832	1833	Santiago Abreú	
1833	14 May 1835	Francisco Sarracino	
July 1835	August 1837	Albino Pérez	Assassinated in office during the Río Arriba Rebellion
10 August 1837	September 1837	José María González	Elected to lead the Canton de Nuevo Mexico during the Río Arriba Rebellion. From Taos Pueblo, only Pueblo Indian elected Governor of New Mexico.
Early September 1837	21 September 1837	Pablo Montoya	Alcalde of Taos Pueblo, signed armistice with Armijo ending the Río Arriba Rebellion.
21 September 1837	1844	Manuel Armijo	Second term, after defeating the Río Arriba Rebellion. Executed José María González.
31 January 1844	10 April 1844	Mariano Chaves	Acting; son of Francisco Xavier Chávez
13 April 1844	29 April 1844	Felipe Sena	Acting
29 April 1844	1845	Mariano Martínez de Lejanza	
1 May 1845	16 November 1845	José Chávez y Castillo	Acting; son of Francisco Xavier Chávez
November 1845	August 1846	Manuel Armijo	Third term
August 1846	September 1846	Juan Bautista Vigil y Alarid	Interim
19 January 1847	7 February 1847	Pablo Montoya	Second term, led the Taos Revolt against the United States. Executed by Americans forces for treason despite his legal status as a Mexican citizen as he predeceased the Treaty of Guadalupe Hidalgo.

== See also ==
- History of New Mexico
  - List of Spanish governors of New Mexico (1598–1822)
  - List of U.S. governors of New Mexico (1846–present)
