= Pedro María de Allande =

62th Spanish governor of New Mexico
- In office 1816–1818
- Preceded by: Alberto Maynez
- Succeeded by: Facundo Melgares

Personal details
- Profession: Governor of New Mexico

Pedro María de Allande was the Governor of Santa Fe de Nuevo México between 1816 and 1818.

== Career ==
He was appointed governor of Santa Fe de Nuevo México in 1816. One of his first duties as governor was to lead a military campaign against a Nabajo tribe, as they were carrying out a series of raids in Nuevo México. Allande's victory forced the Navajos to leave the province, as these were the governor's demands. In June 1817 the Viceroy of New Spain ordered Allande to arrest a group of smugglers operating in New Mexico. He entrusted this task to Lieutenant Mariano Bernal. The group, made up of 24 smugglers and their leaders, Agustus P. Choteau and Julio de Mun, were tried by a court-martial in the provincial capital but were acquitted. However, the judge confiscated their merchandise. In 1818, he visited the schools of Santa Fe at the request of Friar Juan Bautista Quevara, who was the Visitor of the missions in the province. The day chosen for his visit was when the children were taking their exams after leaving Mass.

His government only lasted two years, since in 1818 Facundo Melgares was appointed as the new governor.
