= José Antonio Chaves =

7th Mexican Governor of New Mexico

7th Mexican Governor of New Mexico
- In office September 1829 – 1832
- Preceded by: Manuel Armijo
- Succeeded by: Santiago Abreú

José Antonio Chaves (or Chávez) was gefe político or Governor of the territory of Santa Fe de Nuevo México (New Mexico) from September 1829 until 1832.

== Family ==
José Antonio Chaves was a descendant of don Pedro Durán de Chávez, a conquistador from the Extremadura province of Spain. Other prominent members of the Chávez family in New Mexico were Governors Francisco Xavier Chávez (1822–23) and his son Mariano Chaves (1833–34), and don Mariano's son Colonel José Francisco Chaves, a delegate to the United States Congress for three terms, starting in 1865, and after whom Chaves County, New Mexico is named.

== Political career ==
Chaves was New Mexican deputy to the Congress in Mexico City for the 1827-1828 term. The Guerrero government appointed him governor of New Mexico in March 1829. He took office as gefe político or Governor in September 1829, holding office until 1832. In October 1843, as a step to reestablishing constitutional government, elections were held in New Mexico. José Antonio Chaves was chosen as one of the electors who chose a representative to Congress from New Mexico and chose the members of the first departmental assembly. Chaes was among the assembly members.

== Governor of New Mexico ==
In November 1829 Chaves dispatched an expedition of 60 men led by Antonio Armijo to discover a route to the Alta California. In May 1830 they had returned and Chaves was able to send the expedition's diary to Mexico City, pointing out that the route was not as long as had been thought and could be commercially valuable. These discoveries, and notes from the governor's office, led to the publishing of the route on maps ultimately leading to the establishment of permanent settlements in the Las Vegas Valley, today southern Nevada.

In 1830 Chaves complained to the ayuntamiento (council) of Santa Fe that although the material had been provided, they had still not constructed a cemetery. The council retorted that in a republic they could not force anyone to do the work, and had been unable to contract any bricklayers.
