= José Chávez y Castillo =

Mexican landowner and trader

Mexican Governor of New Mexico (Acting)
- In office 1 May 1845 – 16 November 1845
- Preceded by: Mariano Martínez de Lejarza
- Succeeded by: Manuel Armijo

Personal details
- Profession: Landowner, Trader

José Chávez y Castillo was a Mexican landowner and trader who served as provisional Governor of New Mexico from 1 May 1845 until 16 November 1845, when Manuel Armijo became governor for a third term.

José Chávez was the son of Francisco Xavier Chávez, the first governor of New Mexico after it gained independence from Spain, and brother of Mariano Chaves, who also served briefly as acting governor. With the opening up of the Santa Fe Trail, by 1839 José Chávez and his nephew Antonio José Chávez were among the Santa Fe traders engaged in the profitable business of importing goods from the United States, which other traders would buy and transport to markets in Chihuahua and other places to the south.
