= Felipe Sena =

Felípe Sena

Mexican Governor of New Mexico (Acting)
- In office 13 April 1844 – 29 April 1844
- Preceded by: Mariano Cháves
- Succeeded by: Mariano Martínez de Lejanza

Personal details
- Profession: Politician

Felípe Sena was a prominent New Mexican who was briefly the acting governor of New Mexico in April 1844. He also served as Mayor of Santa Fe, New Mexico (1840) and as a member of the first departmental assembly of New Mexico (1843).

== Career ==
In 1840, don Felipe Sena became alcalde primero (Mayor) of Santa Fe. On 23 October 1843 Sena was elected a member of the first departmental assembly of New Mexico. Early in 1844, Governor Manuel Armijo decided to give up active involvement in the governor position, and appointed Mariano Chavez as gobernado interino (acting governor) as of 31 January 1844.

Don Mariano Chavez y Castillo resigned on 10 April due to illness. Felipe Sena then became acting governor, although Armijo remained governor. The case of the Maxwell Land Grant came up during his short term of office. This was a huge grant of land that had been made in January 1841 to Guadalupe Miranda of Santa Fe and Charles Beaubien, a French Canadian who had lived in Taos since 1823. The two had promptly deeded a quarter interest in the land to Governor Armijo and a quarter to the trader Charles Bent. Father Antonio José Martínez of Taos protested against the grant, which he said encroached on traditional Indian grounds. Mariano Chavez suspended the grant but Sena reinstated the grant.

In March 1844, General Santa Anna removed Armijo from office and appointed the commandante militar, Mariano Martínez de Lejanza, as "constitutional governor". On 29 April 1844 Sena handed over the office to Martinez. When the Maxwell Land Grant can before Martinez, he denied it on legal grounds. In April 1845 Felipe Sena was President of the Departmental Assembly, involved in the dispute over the Los Manuelitas Grant.

Felipe Sena was the great-uncle of Colonel José D. Sena, clerk of the Supreme Court of New Mexico.
