= José Antonio Vizcarra =

Mexican soldier who served as Governor of New Mexico

3rd Mexican Governor of New Mexico
- In office November 1822 – September 1823
- Preceded by: Francisco Xavier Chávez
- Succeeded by: Bartolomé Baca

Personal details
- Born: Cuencamé, Durango
- Profession: Soldier

José Antonio Vizcarra (or Viscarra) was a Mexican soldier who served as Governor of New Mexico from 1822 to 1823. While conducting an expedition against the Navajos in 1823, he was the first to record the ruins of Chaco Canyon.

== Career outline ==
José Antonio Vizcarra was the son of Don Juan José Viscarra and Doña Gertrudis Alvarado, and was born in Cuencamé, Durango. Entering the army, he rose to the rank of Lieutenant-Colonel and was appointed military chief of New Mexico in October 1822. Vizcarra was governor of New Mexico from November 1822 to September 1823. From June to September 1823 he led a punitive expedition to the west and north against the Navajo.

On 14 April 1824, Lieutenant Colonel José Antonio Vizcarra, Special Commander of the province, married Doña Ana Maria Ortiz, widow of Sheriff Don Fernando Delgado. His wife was the sister of Ramón Ortiz y Miera, who became an influential priest and after the Mexican–American War (1846–1848) was to be the repatriation commissioner. Vizcarra briefly acted as governor again in 1828. He was then appointed assistant inspector-general of the army in New Mexico, and was inspector-general from 1829 to 1833.

== Governor of New Mexico ==
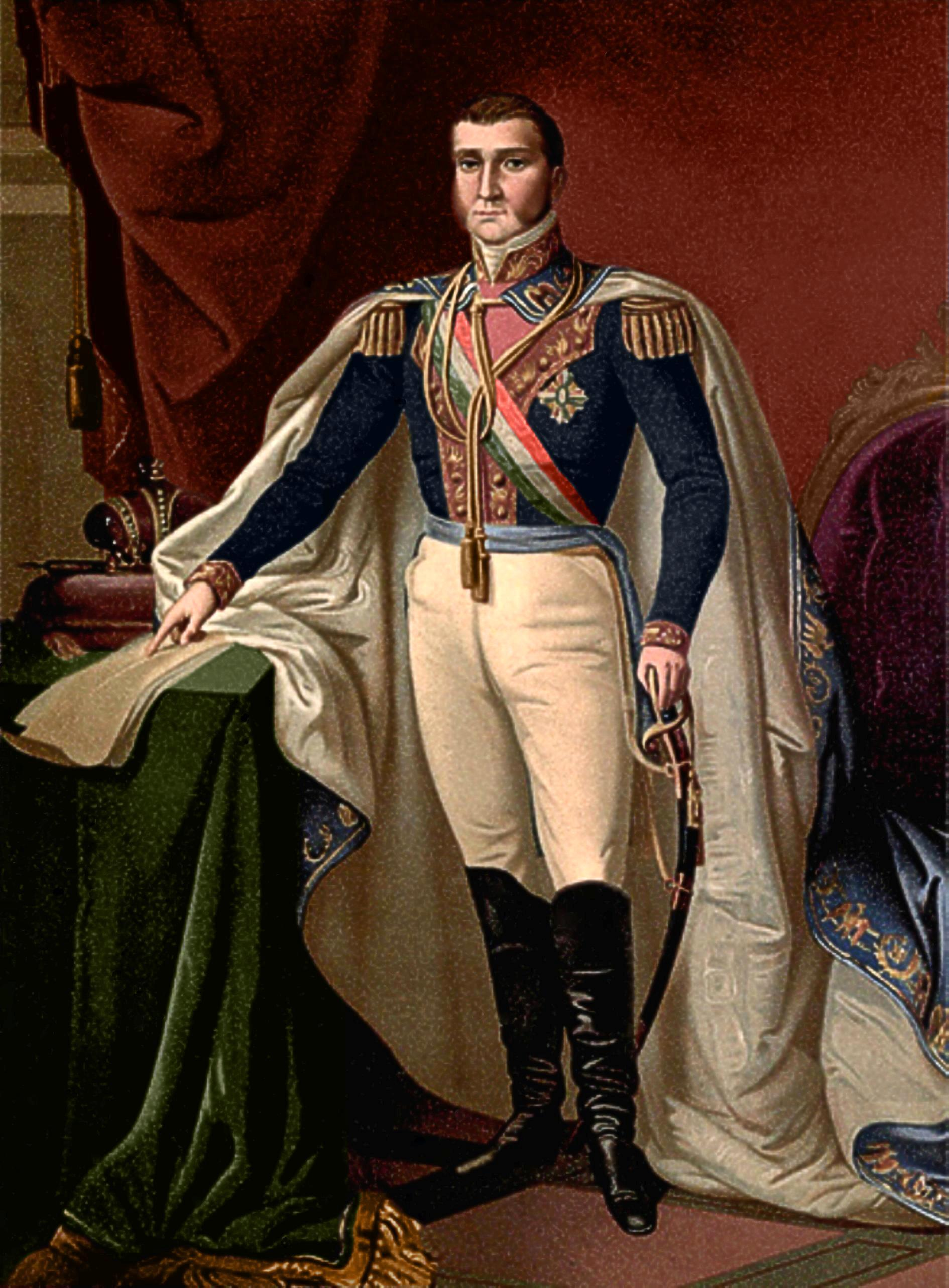
Agustin de Iturbide as Emperor of Mexico

Vizcarra was elected Governor of New Mexico, succeeding Francisco Xavier Chávez in November 1822. As governor, in March 1823 he was asked to mediate over sales of land from Abiquiu Pueblo. Although the Indians had been paid, such sales were not allowed. Vizcarra refused to validate the sales, and ordered that the purchase prices should be refunded by the Indians of the Pueblo.

News traveled slowly between Mexico City and Santa Fe, a distance of perhaps 1,500 miles (2,400 km) over poor roads. On 31 October 1822 Agustín de Iturbide, who had been declared "constitutional emperor" of Mexico, closed down the Congress and assumed absolute power. When the news of Iturbide's coup reached Santa Fe, Colonel Viscarra arranged for a great celebration in favor of the emperor in December 1822. On 2 December, the revolutionary leader Antonio López de Santa Anna started a revolt against the emperor in Veracruz. The revolt spread, and in February 1823 Iturbide restored Congress, abdicated and went into exile.

On 26 March 1823, Vizcarra had heard of Santa Anna's revolt, but did yet not know the emperor had abdicated. He and another prominent citizen decided to send a letter to the Emperor telling him that New Mexico " is not disposed to soil its hands with the vile stain of infidelity; that its people honor their solemn vows, wishing rather to be the victims of tyrants than to agree with their anarchistic ideas." The letter was a mistake. News of Iturbide's abdication reach Santa Fe at the end of May, and Vizcarra was reprimanded by the commander of Chihuahua for demonstrating loyalty to the former emperor. Viscarra and other leading citizens hastily prepared a statement welcoming the return of the Congress.

In September 1823 Vizcarra was succeeded by Bartolomé Baca, a former militia captain, who took the title "jéfe politíco" rather than governor.

== Navajo expedition ==
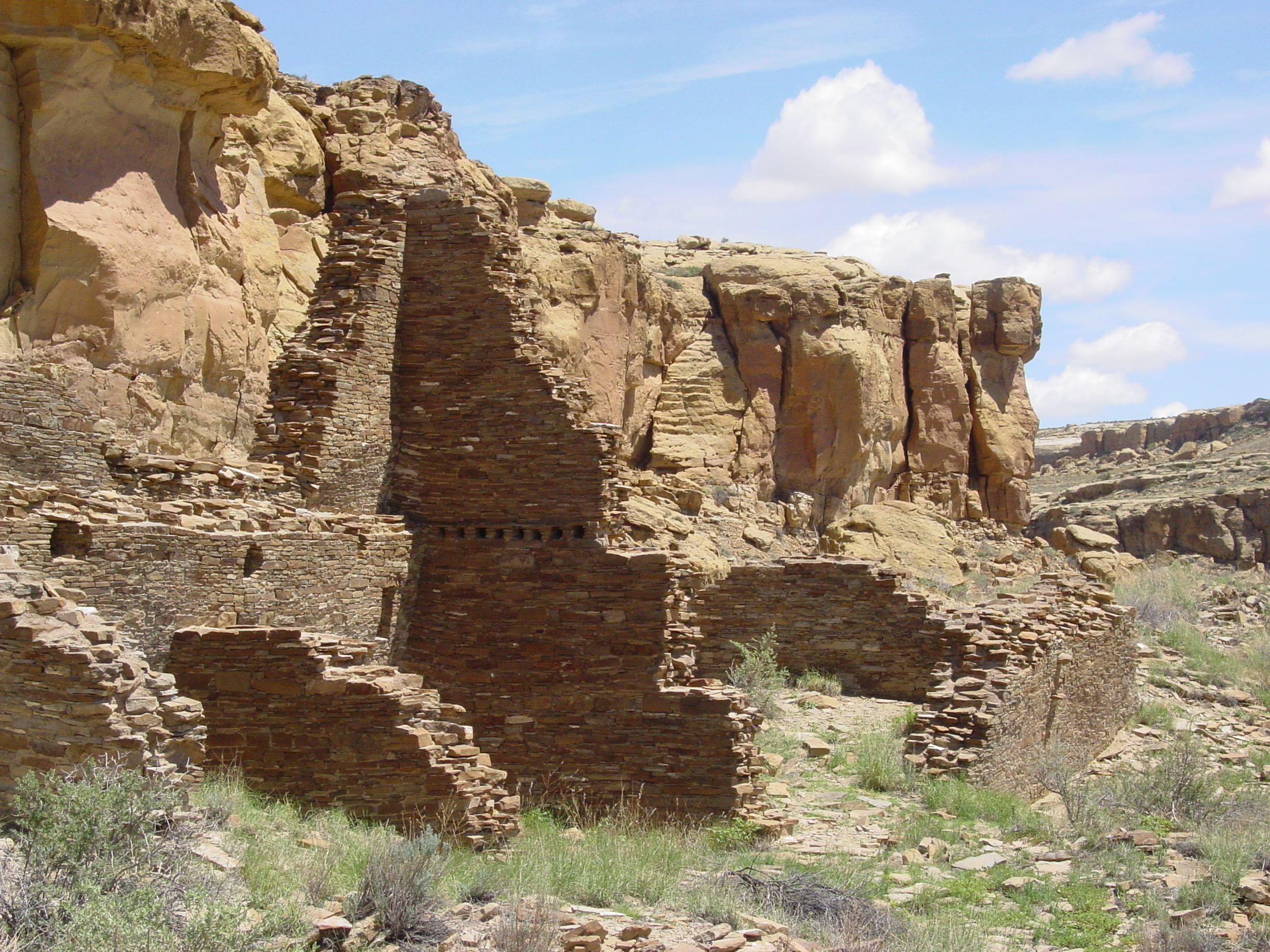
An image of Hungo Pavi, located in the central portion of Chaco Canyon

Facundo Melgáres, the last Spanish governor of New Mexico before independence in 1822, had conducted two unsuccessful expeditions against the Navajos, who were attacking the New Mexican settlers. Melgáres had sued for peace in October 1822. (Note: Although Melgares handed over to Francisco Xavier Chávez as géfe político (governor) in July 1822, he remained géfe militar (military chief) until he handed over this office to Vizcarra in October 1822.) Vizcarra met Navajo leaders at Paguate on 12 February 1823. He essentially stated that the Spanish would settle the Navajos in pueblos and energetically convert them to the Catholic religion. The Navajos were not interested in settling and becoming Christian. They rejected the proposed treaty and renewed the fight. Six New Mexicans were killed at Socorro in April and eight more at Sabinal in May.

On 18 June 1823 Vizcarra led 1,500 troops in a 74-day expedition against the Navajos of western New Mexico. His route took him through the Chuska Mountains to the Hopi mesas in what is now Arizona. While leading this force west from Jemez Pueblo, Vizcarra reported seeing the ruins of many Chacoan buildings along the route, which was to become an established trail for the next forty years. This was the first documented visit to Chaco Canyon. The expedition reached Canyon de Chelly in what is now eastern Arizona. The expedition went north towards Utah, reaching Oljeto Creek in what is now San Juan County, Utah. On this expedition thirty three Navajos were killed, of whom eight were women, and about 30 were captured.

In retaliation for Vizcarra's expedition, the Navajos raided Socorro again, and attacked Tome, Albuquerque and reached the outskirts of Santa Fe. The 1823 raid marked the start of a long period of raids and counter raids lasting until 1848 as New Mexicans took Navajos captive to work as slaves, and as Navajos raided to recover their people and to obtain livestock.

== Encounters with U.S. traders and troops ==
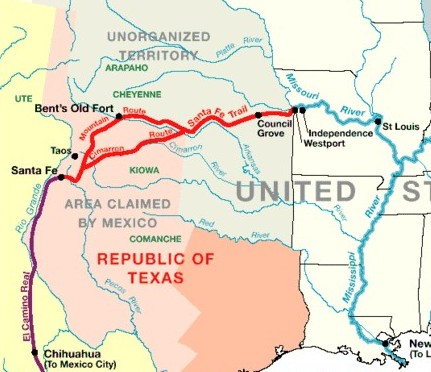
Santa Fe Trail between Mexico and Missouri

Under the Transcontinental Treaty of 1819, the frontier between the United States and Mexico was in part defined by the Arkansas River in what is now the state of Colorado. In the spring of 1829 a small contingent of U.S. Army soldiers was ordered to move to Cantonment Leavenworth to protect traders travelling between Missouri and Santa Fe, New Mexico. In June 1829 the force escorted a group of 79 traders led by Charles Bent as far as the Arkansas river, which they crossed on 10 July 1829. The U.S. military commander gave the traders a letter to the Governor of Santa Fe informing him of the U.S. military presence and asking him to protect the traders while they were in New Mexico. When only six miles south of the river, the traders were attacked by Kiowas and forced into a defensive position. They sent a request for help to the U.S. troops, who crossed the river into Mexican territory, the first such incursion. After the Indians left, the traders moved on and the troops returned to the Arkansas.

Vizcarra was given command of soldiers to protect a caravan of 300 people with a large herd of livestock, accompanied by about 90 traders on the return journey. The caravan met a large group of Indians traveling on foot, probably Kiowas and Comanches, near the Cimarron River. During a cautious parley, one of the Indians raised his gun to shoot Viscarra. His life was saved by a Pueblo Indian who interposed himself and died instead. The Indians fled, and several of them were hunted down and scalped. The caravan reached the Arkansas in mid-October 1829. The Mexican and U.S. soldiers exchanged courtesies before returning to their bases. This was an important episode, marking the start of a period of good relations between the two countries.

In 1830, Vizcarra intercepted a caravan of traders on the way to Taos. The encounter took place on the Canadian River. According to Ceran St. Vrain, one of the traders, "The object in coming out so fare to meet us was to prevent Smuggling and it had the desired effeck."
