= José Chávez (footballer) =

Mexican footballer (born 1983)

José Arturo Chávez Fernández (born 3 September 1983 in Ciudad Mante, Tamaulipas) is a Mexican footballer.

He currently plays as a forward for Club Universidad Nacional, a Mexico City team commonly known as the Pumas. He joined the Pumas youth system and worked his way through the ranks to make his first division debut in 2005, is considered a substitute player, but this season he would try to become a regular starter.
