= José Vizcarra (basketball) =

Peruvian basketball player (1927–1976)

Personal information
- Full name: José Alberto Vizcarra Nieto
- Born: 16 March 1927 Ilo, Peru
- Died: 13 September 1976 (aged 49) Arequipa, Peru

Sport
- Sport: Basketball

José Alberto Vizcarra Nieto (16 March 1927 – 13 September 1976) was a Peruvian basketball player. He competed in the men's tournament at the 1948 Summer Olympics.
