= Mariano Chaves =

Spanish-American politician (1799–1845)

Mexican Governor of New Mexico (Acting)
- In office 31 January 1844 – 10 April 1844
- Preceded by: Manuel Armijo
- Succeeded by: Felipe Sena

Personal details
- Born: 31 December 1799
- Died: May 1845 (aged 45)
- Children: José Francisco Chaves
- Profession: Soldier

José Mariano Chaves y Castillo (or Mariano Chávez) (31 December 1799 – May 1845) was a wealthy Mexican landowner who was the acting governor of New Mexico for a few months during 1844. Chaves County, New Mexico is named after him.

== Family ==
José Mariano Chaves was born on 31 December 1799, the son of New Mexico Governor Francisco Xavier Chávez (1822–1823), a descendant of don Pedro Durán de Chávez, a conquistador from the Extremadura province of Spain. The governor José Antonio Chaves (1829–1832) was another prominent member of the Chávez family in New Mexico.

Mariano Chaves was a member of the New Mexican landowning elite. An Anglo-American visitor to Santa Fe in 1846 described the wealth displayed in his house, which was furnished with Brussels carpets, white marble tables, gilt framed mirrors and candelabras.

Mariano Chaves married Dolores Perea, daughter of Pedro Jose Perea, a descendant of an early New Mexico settler. Their son José Francisco Chaves served three terms in the United States House of Representatives as Delegate from the New Mexico Territory, 1865 to 1871.

After Mariano's death, Dolores Perea married the prosperous trader Henry Connelly in 1849. Connelly was governor of New Mexico Territory during the American Civil War.

== Career ==
Mariano Chaves was acting political chief in 1835 after Francisco Sarracino had left office, holding this position until Albino Pérez became political chief. He was chief of staff of Governor Manuel Armijo during the revolt of 1837. He became inspector general of the New Mexico military forces.

In 1840, he served as political chief. In September 1841, a force of Texans entered New Mexico heading for Santa Fe. They were captured by superior Mexican forces and forced to march south to Mexico City, suffering ill treatment on the journey. Chaves provided assistance to the prisoners in the form of blankets and provisions.

In April 1843, Mariano's younger brother, the trader Antonio José Chaves, was travelling along the Santa Fe Trail between Santa Fe and Independence, Missouri when he was attacked, robbed and murdered by a party of Texans. The killers were caught by U.S. troops and the leaders put to death, largely due to the influence of Chaves.

Early in 1844, Governor Manuel Armijo decided to give up active involvement in the governor position, and appointed Mariano Chaves as gobernado interino (acting governor) as of 31 January 1844. Mariano Chaves resigned on 10 April due to illness. Felipe Sena, President of the Departmental Assembly, then became acting governor, although Armijo remained governor.

In March 1844, General Santa Anna removed Armijo from office and appointed the commandante militar, Mariano Martínez de Lejarza, as "constitutional governor". Martinez assumed office at the end of April and held the position until 1 May 1845.

José Mariano Chaves died in May 1845.

== Sources ==
- Dunbar-Ortiz, Roxanne (2007-09-14). Roots of Resistance: A History of Land Tenure in New Mexico. University of Oklahoma Press. p. 84. ISBN 978-0-8061-3833-6.
- Gannett, Henry (1905). The origin of certain place names in the United States. Govt. Print. Off. p. 77.
- Gregg, Josiah (1845). Gregg's Commerce of the Prairies, Or, The Journal of a Sante Fe Trader, 1831-1839. Applewood Books. ISBN 978-1-4290-0249-3.
- "Jose Francisco Chaves". Hispanic Americans in Congress, 1822–1995. Library of Congress. July 15, 2010.
- Julyan, Robert Hixson (1996). The Place Names of New Mexico. UNM Press. ISBN 978-0-8263-1689-9.
- Keleher, William A. (2007-11-30). Turmoil in New Mexico, 1846–1868. Sunstone Press. ISBN 978-0-86534-621-5.
- "New Mexico Governors". State of New Mexico – Commission of Public Records ~ State Records Center and Archives. Archived from the original on 2012-02-27.
- New Mexico. Office of the Secretary of State (1887). The Legislative blue-book of the territory of New Mexico: With the rules of order, fundamental law, official register and record, historical data, compendium of facts, etc., etc. C.W. Green, public printer.
- Oliva, Leo E. (June 1988). Adventure on the Santa Fe Trail: selected papers from the Santa Fe Trail Symposium, Hutchinson, Kansas, September 24-26, 1987. Kansas State Historical Society. ISBN 978-0-87726-033-2.
- Smith, Randy (2006-01-01). Heroes of the Santa Fe Trail, 1821-1900. C&M Online Media, Inc. ISBN 978-1-932482-31-7.
- Twitchell, Ralph Emerson (1912). The Leading Facts of New Mexican History, Vol II (Softcover). Sunstone Press. ISBN 978-0-86534-566-9.
- Twitchell, Ralph Emerson (1925). Old Santa Fe. Sunstone Press. ISBN 978-0-86534-574-4.
- Van Ness, John R.; Van Ness, Christine M. (1980-06-01). Spanish & Mexican land grants in New Mexico and Colorado. Sunflower University Press. ISBN 978-0-89745-012-6.
