= Francisco Xavier Chávez =

Mexican landowner and merchant

Francisco Xavier Chaves

2nd Mexican Governor of New Mexico
- In office 5 July 1822 – November 1822
- Preceded by: Facundo Melgares
- Succeeded by: José Antonio Vizcarra

Personal details
- Born: January 10, 1768-69? Santa Fé de Nuevo México, New Spain (now Santa Fé, New Mexico, U.S.)
- Died: 1838 Los Padillas, Mexican Republic (now Bernalillo County, New Mexico, United States)
- Spouse: Ana María Álvarez del Castillo
- Children: 9
- Profession: Landowner and merchant

Francisco Xavier Chávez (sometimes spelt as Francisco Xavier Chaves) was a Mexican landowner and merchant who was the second jefe político (equivalent to governor) of the territory of Santa Fe de Nuevo México after Mexico gained its independence from Spain in 1822.

== Early life ==
Francisco Xavier Chávez (born 1768/1769 Nuevo Mexico, New Spain) belonged to an old Spanish family, the son of Tomás Chávez and María Josefa Padilla. They had been prominent in New Mexico since it was created as a province in 1598. The immigrant ancestor is said to be Pedro Durán de Chávez from Extremadura, Spain. He had large holdings of land and livestock and excellent political connections that he leveraged to become one of the dominant traders in the new republic.

== Political career ==
In January 1822 the Governor under the Spanish regime, Facundo Melgares, lost the title of governor but was called political and military chief until he retired in June, reporting to the commander at Chihuahua on military matters. Melgáres called for the election of electors, and on January 28 the electors chose Francisco Perez Serrano y Aguirre as New Mexico's first deputy to the Congress of Mexico. The next day the electors chose the New Mexican legislative body, with Francisco Xavier Chaves heading the list. When the legislature met for the first time on 14 April 1822, Chaves served as the first presiding officer. Melgáres left office on 5 July 1822, and Francisco Xavier Chaves took his place, holding office for just five months, when he was succeeded by Colonel José Antonio Vizcarra.

== Personal life ==
He married Ana María Álvarez del Castillo on September 14, 1799, and had four sons - Mariano José, José, Antonio José, Tomás and five daughters - Juana, María Francisca, Mercedes, Dolores and Bárbara. One of his daughters may also be named Josefa, through whom Chavez is a paternal ancestor of singer and actress Demi Lovato. His sons Mariano, José and Antonio José continued and expanded the family business of carrying freight between Mexico and the United States along the Santa Fe Trail.
