= Mariano Martínez de Lejarza =

Former governor of the Mexican Republic

14th Mexican Governor of New Mexico
- In office April 29, 1844 – 1845
- Preceded by: Felipe Sena
- Succeeded by: José Chavéz y Castillo

Personal details
- Born: Mexico City
- Profession: Soldier and politician

Mariano Martínez de Lejarza was acting Governor of the territory of Santa Fe de Nuevo México (in present-day New Mexico) from 1844 to 1845.

== Career ==
Martínez was a native of the State of Mexico. He spent most of his career in Chihuahua, and in October 1843 was appointed by General Mariano Monterde military commandant in Santa Fe. Martínez held the rank of brevet Brigadier General. He was appointed governor on 30 March 1844 and took office on 29 April. He initiated various improvements in Santa Fe, for example planting trees on the plaza de armas and along the street and road leading northwest to the Rosario chapel, with a ditch to provide water for them. He also converted the plaza into a bullfight arena, with stalls for spectators. He also borrowed a press so he could start publishing a newspaper.

New Mexico was a province of Mexico until 30 December 1836. It then became a department, with a departmental legislature in Santa Fe and representation in the Departmental Congress in Durango. On 17 June 1844 Governor Martínez divided the department into three districts, Central, North and Southeast. Each district was in turn divided into seven counties. The population of the entire department at that time, including Pueblo Indians, was 67,736.

At one time during his term as governor, Martínez received some Ute delegates in Santa Fe. The discussion became heated, and Martínez called the guards, who killed some of the Utes. This eventually led to a full-scale war with the Utes. He was removed from office early in 1845. Martinez was succeeded by José Chávez y Castillo, who was provisional governor from 1 May 1845 to 16 November 1845.
