= Facundo Melgares =

Spanish military officer

63rd Spanish Governor of New Mexico
- In office 1818 – January 1822
- Preceded by: Pedro María de Allande
- Succeeded by: Position abolished

1st Mexican Governor of New Mexico
- In office January 1822 – July 1822
- Preceded by: Position established
- Succeeded by: Francisco Xavier Chávez

Personal details
- Born: 1775 Caravaca, Murcia Region, Spain
- Died: after 1823 unknown
- Profession: Soldier and politician

Facundo Melgares (1775, Caravaca, Murcia, Spain - after 1823) was a Spanish military officer who served as both the last Spanish Governor of New Mexico and the first Mexican Governor of New Mexico. Melgares was, like most of the officials of the Spanish crown in his time, a member of the Spanish upper class. He is described as a "portly man of military demeanour" and as "a gentleman and gallant soldier".

== Early life ==
Melgares was born in 1775 in Caravaca, Murcia, Spain, to an aristocrat family. A member of the family was a judge of the Audiencia of New Spain. Melgares received a good education and military training and reached the position of lieutenant.

== Military career ==
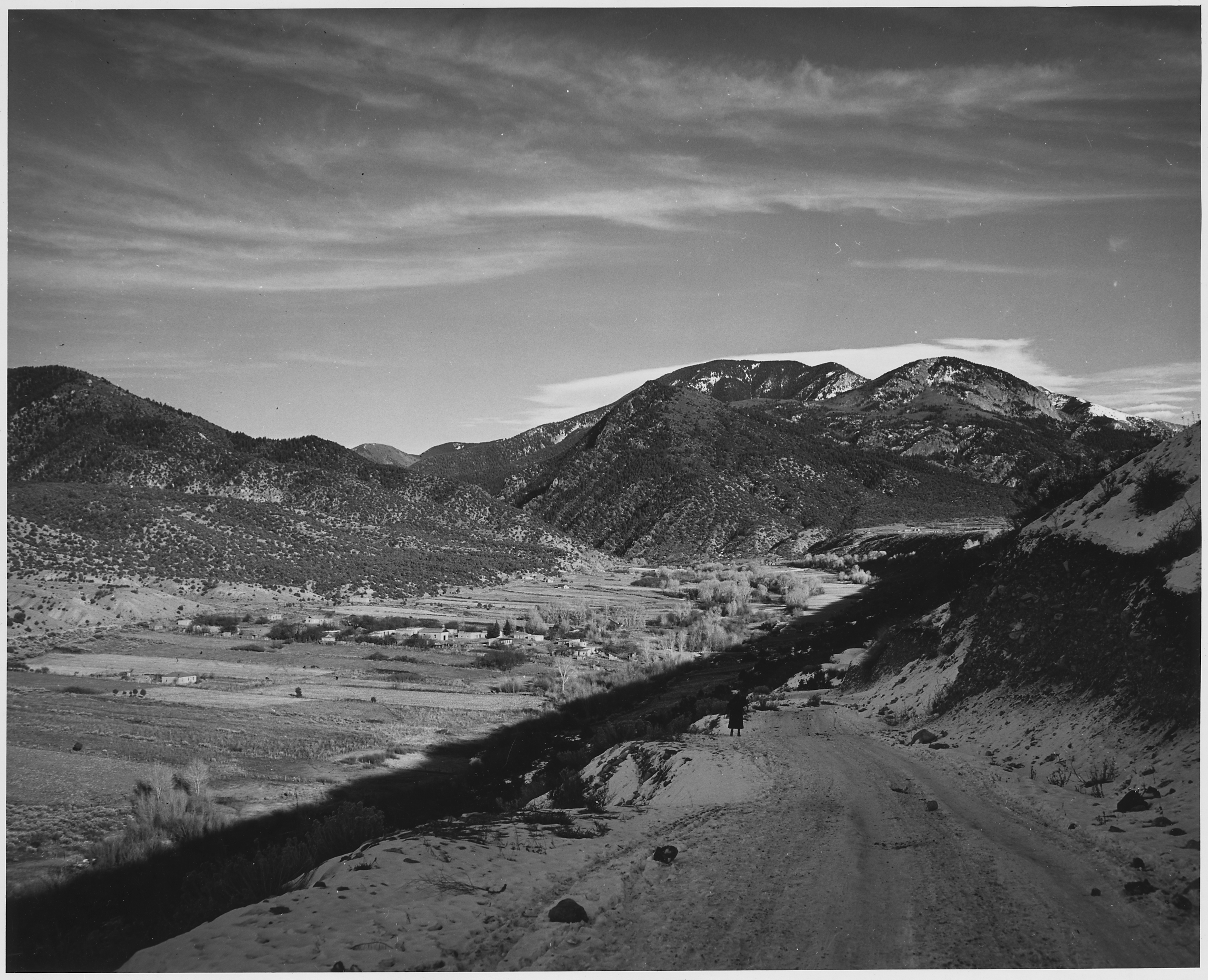
Valdez valley, Taos county, New Mexico.

=== 1803–1811 ===
With the assistance of his father-in-law, Lieutenant Colonel Alberto Maynez, a future governor of New Mexico and assistant to the commanding general of the Western Provinces, based in Chihuahua, Chihuahua, Melgares began his military career. He was stationed near the northern border of the Spanish territory and remained at that post for approximately ten years.

In 1803, Melgares enlisted at the Presidio of San Fernando de Carrizal, south of El Paso del Norte. He took part in battles against the Apaches, who raided the settlements along the Rio Grande. Melgares was tasked with suppressing the Pawnee, who had attacked a Spanish scouting party. Melgares arrived in Santa Fe, New Mexico, with a force of sixty well-equipped soldiers.

==== Louisiana Purchase ====
The Louisiana Purchase had not made a well defined boundary of the Spanish - US border (and the border of Arkansas was not made certain until 1819). On 30 May 1806, Melgares was called to see the governor of New Mexico, Joaquín del Real Alencaster.

He was tasked with detaining Thomas Jefferson's explorers of the region, Lewis and Clark (which Pedro Vial before him had twice failed to do); resisting American settlement at the Red River; exploring New Mexico to the Missouri River; and negotiating a treaty with the Pawnee Indians in which they would prevent the Anglo-American egress.

Melgares led 105 Spanish soldiers, 400 New Mexican militiamen, 100 Amerindians, and more than 2,000 animals (a caballada of horses). He reached Nebraska. In the third task, Melgares succeeded and planned to build a fort on the Arkansas River.

==== Zebulon Montgomery Pike ====
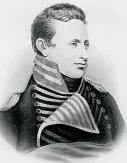
Zebulon Pike 1810

On 1 October 1806, Melgares returned to Santa Fe accompanied by his prisoner, Zebulon Pike, an explorer of Wilkinson, Governor of Louisiana, whom Melgares had detained (or saved from a winter at Pikes Peak). Despite the enmity between Spain and the United States, the two men became close friends and it is Pike's surviving map which details Melgares' expedition.

==== Destinations of the Melgares expedition ====
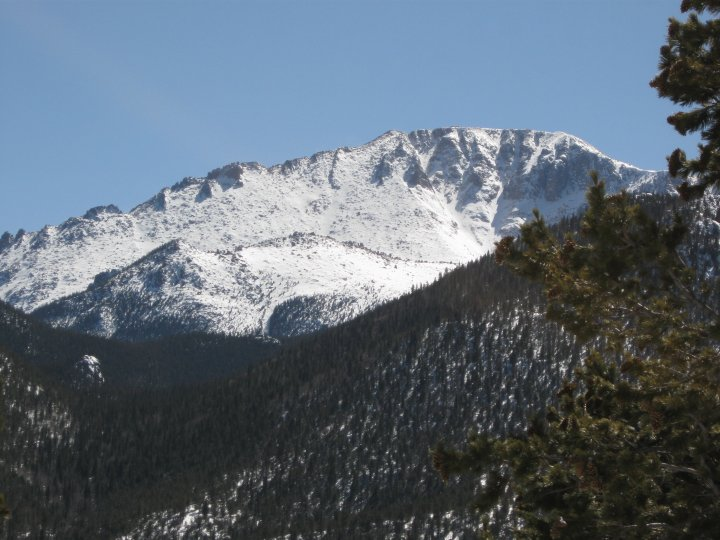
Pikes Peak, Colorado

- Taos (start)
- Canadian river headwaters (Rio Rojo)
- Red River
- Taovayas village
- Medicine Lodge River
- Turkey Creek
- Kinsley
- Sun City, Kansas
- Mouth of Coon Creek on Arkansas river
- Great Bend, Arkansas River
- Pawnee village, Webster County, Nebraska.

In 1810, shortly after the Mexico Declaration of Independence, Melgares was promoted to captain. He led the army of Carriza against the insurgents led by Miguel Hidalgo y Costilla at Saltillo, Coahuila. On 21 March 1811, after several days of heavy fighting, Melgares prevailed and the insurgent leaders were arrested near Monclova, Coahuila.

=== Rights for the Pueblo Amerindians ===
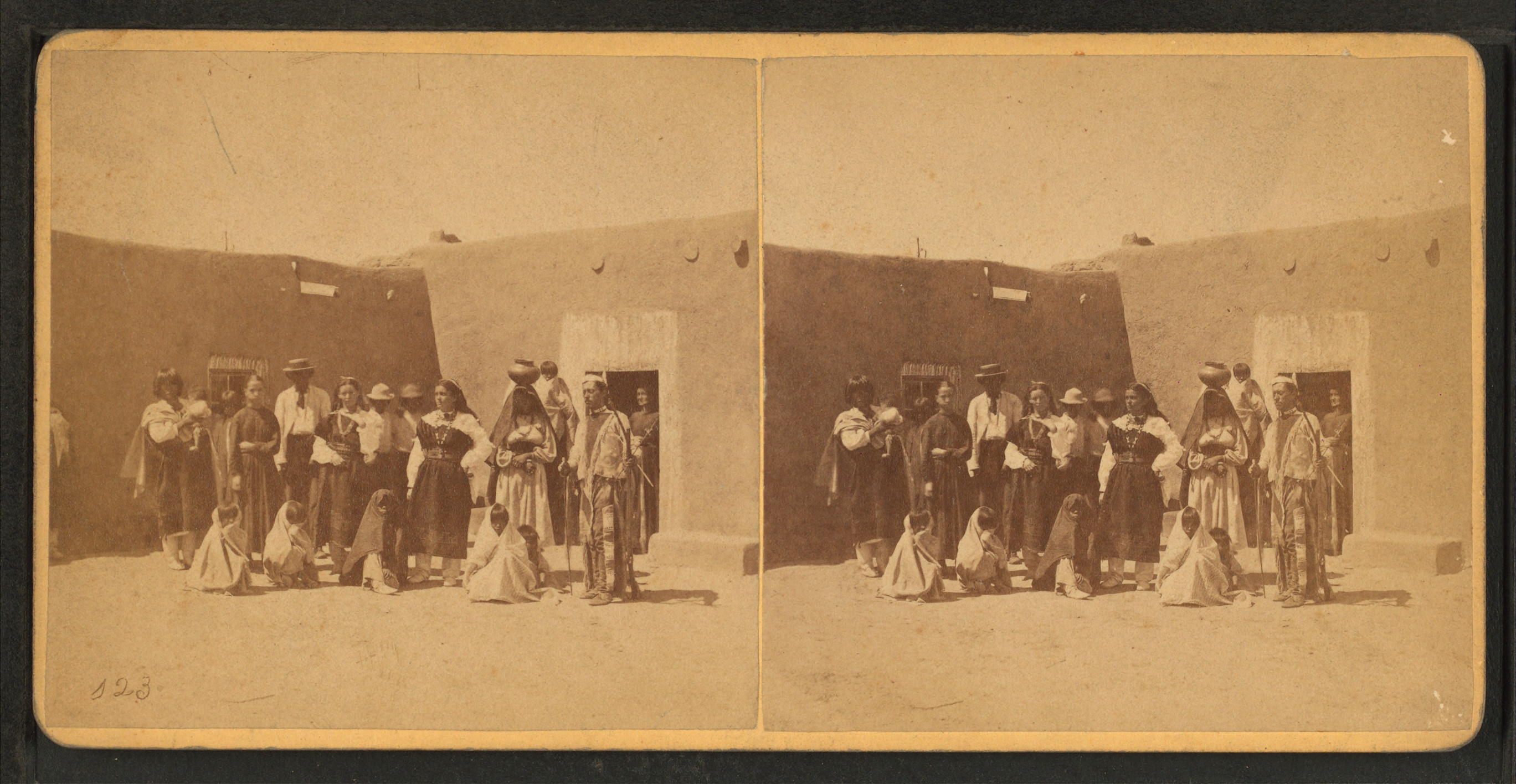
Group of Indians at the Pueblo of San Juan, New Mexico, late 19th century (H. T. Hiester)

Melgares was an equitable civil administrator in his dealings with the Navajo and the Puebloans. He delivered the 1812 Constitution in New Mexico with support for inclusion of the indigenous people in its governance, for example, the right to vote and hold public office. By the end of 1820, municipal governments representing most pueblo people had been formed.

In 1817, Melgares was promoted to commander of the Presidio of Santa Fe. He arrived there in July 1818 with his veteran troops and set about defending the city. He later became acting governor of the province. In August 1818, King Ferdinand VII of Spain, advised by his viceroy, Ruiz de Apodaca and General García Conde, appointed Melgares Governor of New Mexico with the rank of lieutenant colonel.

=== Governor of New Mexico ===
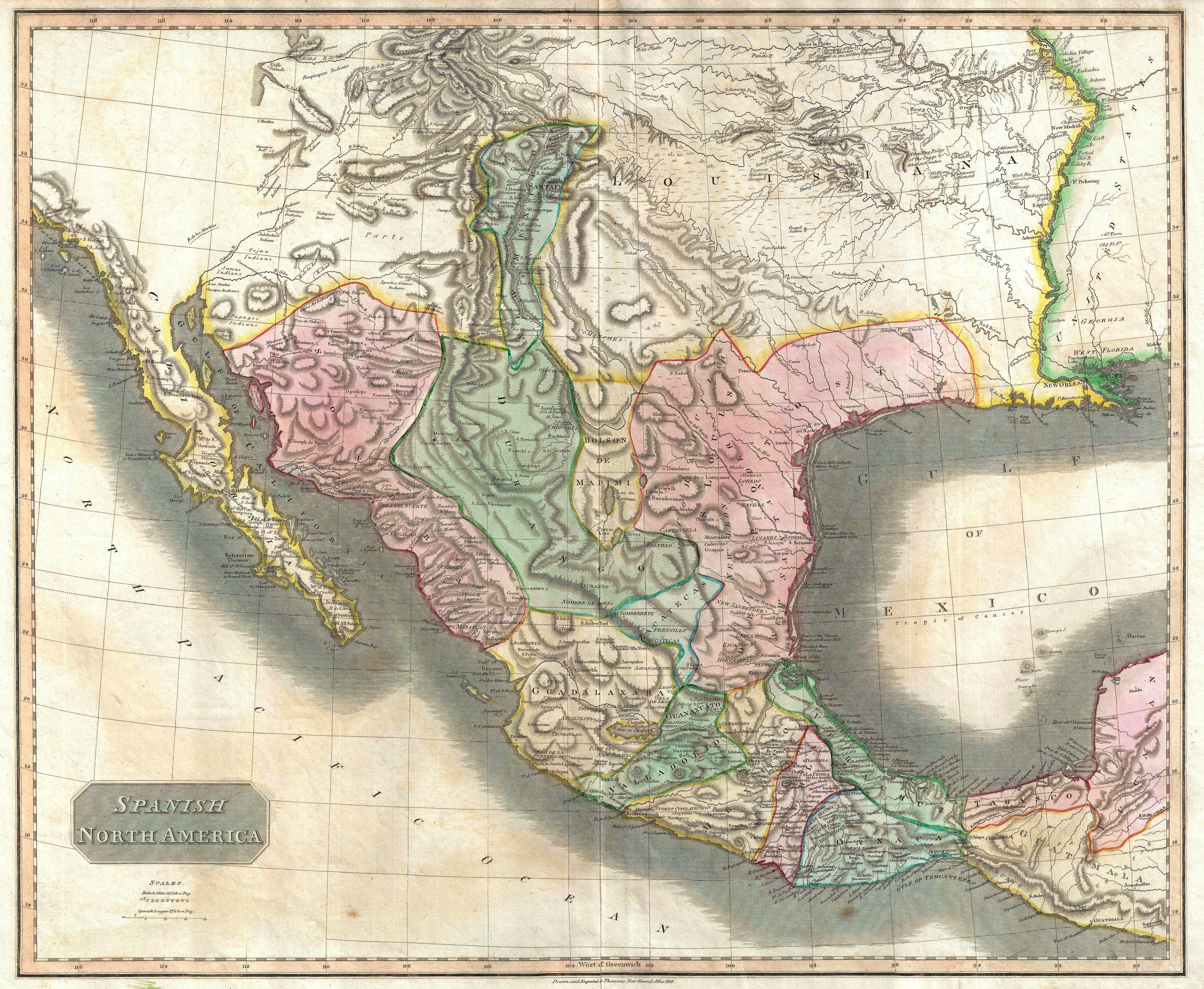
Thomson map of Mexico and Texas, 1814

Melgares' post as Governor of New Mexico was held under the scrutiny of the commanding general of Chihuahua and the viceroy in Mexico City. His responsibilities included administration of civilian activities; defence of the province from local Indian hostilities and foreign invaders in the north; and control of the prison troops and civilian militia.

In the first month of Melgares' office, there were hostilities by Navajo against villages in the north. The governor issued a call to all the citizens of New Mexico, for contributions of grain and other supplies (such as metals for weapons) to aid his forces stationed in Santa Fe. Melgares himself, made a personal donation of cereals, metal and sheep. A local priest donated his local church bell to be cast into munitions. The Presidio of Santa Fe had only 167 soldiers to battle the Navajo and so Melgares sent troops from Chihuahua and some 60 soldiers from San Eleazario (near El Paso).

In late October 1818, Melgares tasked Captain Andrés Gómez Sanudo, chief of the military second in Taos, with marching to Jemez and attacking no later than 7 November 1818. Melgares determined that the Navajo should yield or be driven to the Deserts of California.

Two months before the New Mexico viceroy's alert about an imminent attack by the United States, Melgares had ordered a reconnaissance of the Arkansas Valley to verify rumours of a U.S. presence among the Pawnees. Melgares source was Sergeant José Cayetano Hernández, who said that while he was in captivity, a U.S. Army officer visited the Pawnees to propose a plan of unification with the Kiowas in an effort to invade the Spanish territory. The officer, according to Hernández, promised to arm the Indians in exchange for their allegiance. Both tribes were to meet in the fall, in the Gerbidora (Colorado Springs, Colorado), to finalize plans for an attack on New Mexico. While admitting that he never really saw the U.S. officer, he estimated more than 300 Indians were trained and armed.

Although Melgara did not believe the sergeant, he notified General Garcia Conde and sent Lieutenant Jose Maria de Arce north of the New Mexico border to confirm the intelligence. On 1 September 1818, Arce left Taos with 120 men. Shortly after his departure from northern New Mexico, 400 men under the command of Juan de Dios Peña, the mayor of Taos, joined the expedition. Arce crossed the Sangre de Cristo Mountains into the Huerfano Valley and proceeded to the Platte River but did not find any invading force. Arce confirmed that the Amerindians were loyal to Spain and would alert New Mexico of any planned invasion by the U.S. Despite the reassurances, Melgares requested a reinforcement of 500 soldiers, half as infantry, armed with rifles and bayonets, to strengthen the outposts of the north. Melgares also resumed war against the Navajo. He sent 600 soldiers to Taos, and 400 to El Vado. 800 men were held in reserve to deal with the Navajo. Melgares fought ongoing difficulties related to unrealistic demands of his distant commanders.

In February 1819, when it seemed the U.S.-Mexico border was safe, the commander, General Antonio Cordero, tasked Melgares to make peace with the Native Americans in every way he could. However, Melgares continued to fight under the unlikely mandate of the Hopi requesting Spanish protection against the Navajo. Despite the objections of Viceroy Ruiz de Apodaca and General Cordero, Melgares succeeded and on 21 August 1819, imposed a formal peace agreement between Spain and the Navajo. The next three years in New Mexico were peaceful.

In 1821, Thomas James, an American trader commented that Melgares' troops in Santa Fe were a bedraggled, motley lot and said of Malgares himself,

"The doughty Governor Facundo Melgares, on foot, in his cloak and chapeau de bras, was reviewing this noble army....he was five feet wide, as thick as he was long, and as he waddled from one end of the line to the other, I thought of Alexander, and Hannibal, and Caesar, and how their glories would soon be eclipsed by this hero of Santa Fe."

Melgares remained a staunch monarchist despite the strong likelihood of Mexican independence. Following Agustín de Iturbide's Plan of Iguala, Melgares reluctantly supported the new empire. On 26 December 1821, Melgares received official word that he should swear allegiance to the new Mexican government. In 1821, after independence, Melgares welcomed the first U.S. trade delegation (under William Becknell) to Santa Fe. On 6 January 1822, a local celebration of independence was made.

On 5 July 1822, Melgares was dismissed from his post. He continued as a soldier under the command of his replacement, Francisco Xavier Chávez. The charges leading to Melgares demotion are not known but may have involved the priest of Abiquiu who tried to appropriate town property for his church. In August 1823, Melgares was cleared of all charges. After that, at age 58, Melgares falls from the pages of history.
