= Cantón de Nuevo México =

New Mexican government during the 1837 Rio Arriba Rebellion

- 10 August 1837–21 September 1837
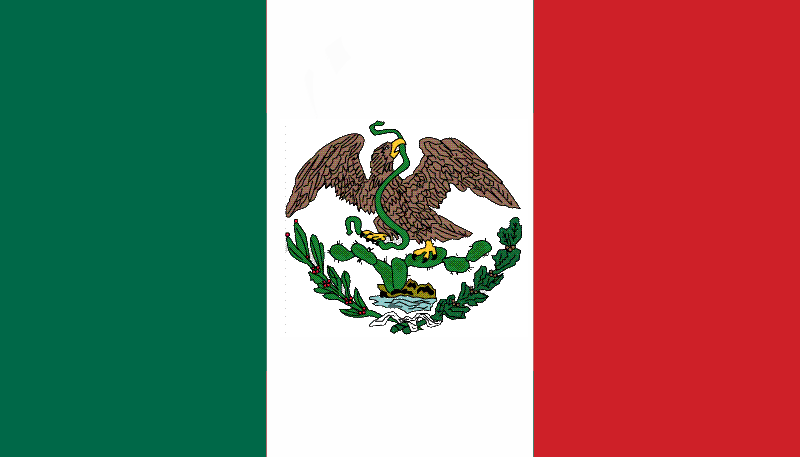
- Flag

- The Cantón de Nuevo México in 1837 (top center)
- Capital: Santa Fe (first); Taos Pueblo (last)
- Official languages: New Mexican Spanish, Tiwa, Tewa, Towa, Keres, Hopi, Zuni
- Religion: Catholicism, Pueblo religion
- Demonym: Nuevomexicano
- Government: Federal republic of Pueblos and Hispano towns; Territory of México
- Governor
  - August 1837: Jose Maria Gonzalez (first)
  - September 1837: Pablo Montoya (last)
- Historical era: Age of Revolution
  - Río Arriba Rebellion: 10 August 1837
  - Disestablished: 21 September 1837
Preceded by	Succeeded by
Santa Fe de Nuevo México; All Pueblo Council	Santa Fe de Nuevo México; All Pueblo Council
- Today part of: New Mexico, Arizona, Colorado, and Texas

The Cantón de Nuevo México, also known as the Junta Popular, was a New Mexican state formed during the 1837 Pueblo-Hispano Río Arriba Rebellion against the Centralist Republic of Mexico's territory of Santa Fe de Nuevo México. New Mexicans opposed to the Siete Leyes assassinated Governor Albino Pérez and took over the state, electing José María González as the governor of the Cantón.

The Cantón was de facto independent, but the rebels were divided over whether to declare de jure independence from Mexico. The rebellion was successful until Governor González floated a plan to invite foreigners to join the rebellion and annex New Mexico to the United States in return for their support. This proposal was unpopular with his fellow rebels and weakened his support internally.

Pablo Montoya overthrew González in early September and became the new governor, moving the capital to Taos Pueblo. After former governor Manuel Armijo recaptured Santa Fe, Montoya betrayed González and his associates to the Centralists in return for amnesty for his faction.

González and Montoya were both Taos Pueblo people and led the most ethnically inclusive government in the history of New Mexico, which was governed as a federation of Pueblos and towns. They became the only Pueblo rulers in the history of New Mexico since Po'pay of the Pueblo republic.

== Background ==
The Centralist Republic of Mexico with revolts generated by the dissolution of the Federal Republic. Area in rebellion Area claimed by the Republics of Texas and the Rio Grande Area not in rebellion

Governor Pérez had arrived from central Mexico in 1835 during the time of the Centralist Republic, which sought to turn all subdivisions of New Mexico into departments governed from Mexico City rather than the local people in the aftermath of a worldwide economci crash and depression. The Pérez administration was opposed by the people and especially by the inhabitants of the northern part of the territory, who resented the "outsider" forced upon them by President Santa Anna. Their dissatisfaction was exacerbated when, following Santa Anna's defeat in Texas, the Mexican government drafted a constitution that tightened administration and tax-collection and imposed property qualifications on political participation. New Mexicans assumed that Pérez would attempt to levy the taxes and completely restructure the regional political system in accordance with the new constitution.

Other grievances included Pérez's reinstatement of Francisco Sarracino, a former governor who had been suspended for fraud from his position as subcomisario (a customs official); Pérez's appointment of a civil servant named Ramón Abreu as prefect when others thought they were better candidates; Pérez's failure to rein in customs officials who defrauded American traders on the Santa Fe Trail, some of whom lived in Taos in Northern New Mexico; and the inadequate food and bad conditions endured by men forced to serve in the militia against the Navajo and Apache. Some may also have resented his adultery (he openly had a relationship with his housekeeper, his wife being in Mexico City) and his wealth and luxurious possessions, as most New Mexicans were poor.

Opposition to Pérez increased, with his opponents circulating rumors of enormous taxes. The Departmental Assembly's list of three nominees for the next gubernatorial term did not include him. Opposition culminated in the summer of 1837, with the spark that set off the rebellion having to do with the alcalde (mayor) of Santa Cruz de la Cañada, Juan José Esquibel. Esquibel had accepted a bribe from a relative to release him from jail when charged with a "grave crime" and had defied Pérez's order to pay a fine and return his relative to jail. Then Esquibel supported two merchants against a man who had documentation that they owed him money. Pérez's appointee as prefect, Ramón Abreu, suspended Esquibel and on learning of the bribe, had him put in jail in irons. At the end of July a mob freed Esquibel, and he organized a rebellion.

== Establishment ==
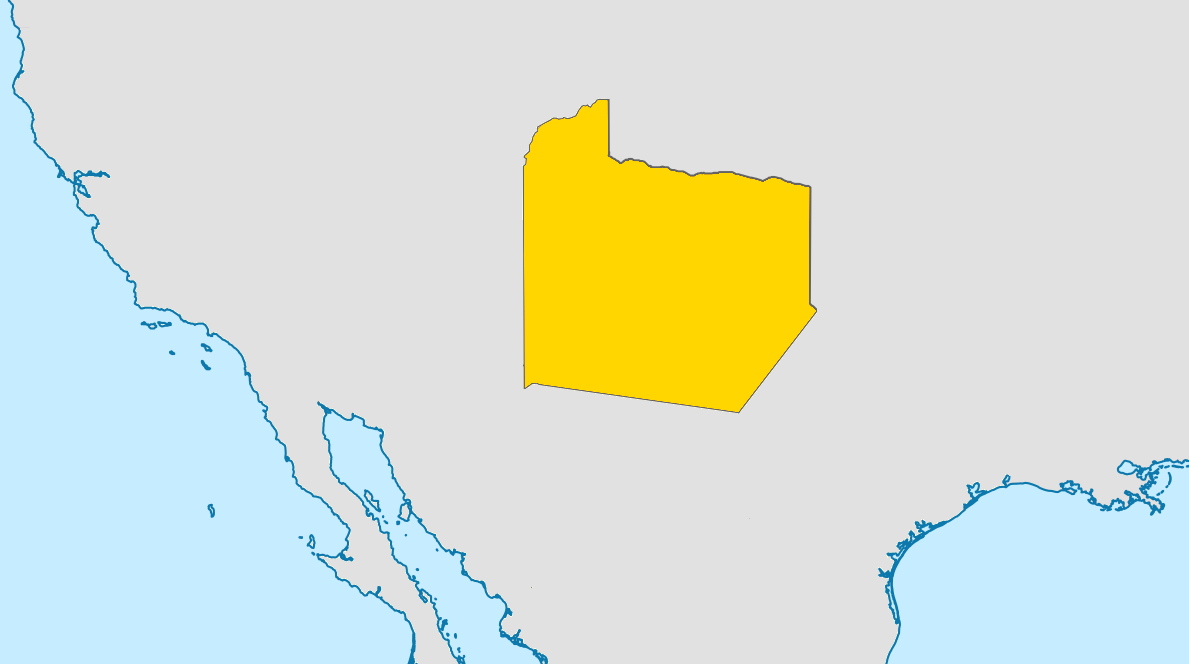
On the 157th anniversary of the Pueblo Revolt, the leaders of the Cantón swore in José González of Taos Pueblo to become the first duly-elected Pueblo governor of New Mexico. González was overthrown when he sought annexation to the United States, which was opposed by the other rebels.

On August 1, rebels from the northern New Mexican communities gathered at Santa Cruz de la Cañada (near Chimayó) with Native Americans from the surrounding pueblos. They called themselves the Cantón (neighborhood or district). On August 3, their twelve leaders, including Esquibel, issued the following declaration:

For God and the Nation and the Faith of Jesus Christ! The principal points we defend are the following: 1. To be with God and the Nation and the Faith of Jesus Christ. 2. To defend our country until we shed every drop of our blood in order to obtain the victory we have in view. 3. Not to admit the Department Plan. 4. Not to admit any tax. 5. Not to admit any disorder desired by those who are attempting to procure it. God and the Nation! Encampment Santa Cruz de la Cañada, August 3, 1837.

When Pérez heard of the rebellion, he attempted to raise a militia of volunteers, but his call did not meet with an encouraging answer. On August 9, Pérez started for Santa Cruz with the troops at his command, meeting the rebels near San Ildefonso. Most of Pérez's men promptly abandoned him and joined the rebels. Pérez retreated to Santa Fe with the few men who remained loyal to him. Unable to find security in the capital, Pérez attempted to flee the city by night, but a group of Santo Domingo Indians intercepted and killed him. The rebels decapitated Pérez and returned his head to Santa Fe for public display. Secretary of the Department Jesús María Alarid, former interim governor and substitute district judge (Juez de Distrito Suplente) of District Court of the New Mexico Territory (Juzgado de Distrito del Territorio de Nuevo México) Santiago Abreú (one of Ramón's brothers), and approximately 20 officials from the Pérez government were also killed, some by mutilation.

That same day on 10 August, the rebels entered the capital and placed José González, a Genizaro (of Taos Pueblo and Pawnee ancestry) from Chimayo, in possession of the palace and as governor of the territory. Initially the rebel government was widely popular in the Department, but it soon made enemies by committing atrocities in gaining power and confiscating the massacre victims' property (at the expense of not only their heirs but also their creditors). The ruling junta popular was contentious and indecisive, its minutes full of crossed-out sections. Meanwhile, in Santa Cruz, the Cantón did not dissolve, instead continuing to imprison people and threaten them with death, outside the control of González's government (Lecompte 1985, pp. 40–46). In Taos, unrest broke out against the Catholic Church and its leader there, Padre Martínez, in early September.

== Counterrevolution ==
In the town of Tomé in southern New Mexico, the priest, Francisco Antonio de Madariaga, began agitating for a counterrevolution. On September 8, he and other "citizens who love their country" adopted the "Plan of Tomé", which named former governor Manuel Armijo to command their force. The 600-man army detachment of Santa Fe, which González had disbanded, reorganized and marched south to join Armijo. Armijo wrote to the Mexican authorities, explaining the situation, and then marched to Santa Fe. He met little resistance; indeed González, who had gone to Taos to visit his family, was arrested in Santa Fe on September 11, before Armijo's arrival on the 14th. While in Santa Fe, Armijo wrote to Mexico again, stating what he had done and asking for troops to complete his victory and re-establish peace.

A former mayor of Taos, Pablo Montoya, led a Cantón force of reportedly 3000 men on Santa Fe. Though Armijo had only about 1,000 soldiers, they were much better trained and equipped than the rebels, and Armijo negotiated a peace treaty that was signed September 21. The rebels surrendered Juan José Esquibel and three other men from Santa Cruz to be indicted, but González was released and the other rebels received amnesty. Montoya would later be executed for his part in the Taos Rebellion.

In October, the rebellion flared up yet again in Las Truchas, east of Santa Cruz. Armijo ordered the execution of Esquibel and the three other prisoners, but to Armijo's anger, his subordinates postponed the execution. Armijo spent the next few months raising funds to feed and pay his soldiers, who were on the point of mutiny. In January 1838, federal troops from Zacatecas and Chihuahua arrived in response to Armijo's request, bringing his official appointment to the governorship.

On January 23, Armijo sent an ultimatum to the rebels in Truchas. The following day, when they did not surrender, he had his four prisoners executed. On the 27th he marched toward Santa Cruz, where González and Antonio Vigil of Truchas were gathering their forces to return to Santa Fe. The two armies met between Santa Cruz and Pojoaque, and Armijo's forces (commanded by Lt. Col. Cayetano Justiniani of the Veracruz dragoons) prevailed in the battle. González fled to Santa Cruz where, by Armijo's order, he was executed in the public square.

Armijo was to remain Governor of New Mexico through the Texan Santa Fe Expedition until 1844. He became Governor again in 1845 until he withdrew without a fight while New Mexico was taken over by the United States Army under the command of General Stephen W. Kearny in 1846.

== Structure ==
The government was a federal republic composed of individual Pueblos and Hispano towns, and "for the first and only time in the history of New Mexico, its duly elected governor was an Indian."

The rebels demonstrated by their actions that they comprised an inclusive entity. They sent letters to the Pueblos inviting their leaders to participate in the Junta Popular. A letter dated 21 August 1837 to Josecito Archibeque, the Indian governor of Cochiti Pueblo, informed him of threats to the rebellion and invited him to come to Santa Fe. The letter, signed on behalf of Governor González by José Esquibel and Juan Vigil, reads, “Let us as compatriots and good Mexicans purify our native land so that we can live in peace and quiet.” González wrote to Tesuque Pueblo on 31 August 1837, stating, “Two Indians from the Pueblo of Tesuque must present themselves … so that they can accompany [leaders] from other Pueblos and march to … El Paso … and leave … for the Capital of the Republic with the objective of representing our rights.” As the rebellion took root, two principles guided its actions: governmental power resided in leaders at the village level, and Pueblo Indians were to be included in all governing councils. It was the most inclusive government New Mexico has ever seen—past or present.

== Legacy ==
The revolt underlined how increased isolation from Mexico City combined with "Mexico's declarations of political equality for all ethnic groups" increased Pueblo and Hispano cooperation in Mexican New Mexico—"the two groups ousted the governor and briefly established an Independent state—the Cantón—with an Indian serving as its governor."

== See also ==
- Río Arriba Rebellion
- José María González
- Pablo Montoya
- Revolts against the Centralist Republic of Mexico
- History of New Mexico
- History of Mexico
- History of the United States
- Mexican Indian Wars
- Pueblo peoples
- Hispanos of New Mexico
- Centralist Republic of Mexico
- Republic of the Rio Grande
- California Revolt led by Juan Bautista Alvarado
- Republic of Yucatán
- Republic of Texas
- Pueblo Revolt
- Taos Revolt
