= Río Arriba Rebellion =

1837 revolt in New Mexico

- Part of Age of Revolution
Date	August 10 – 21 September 1837
Location	Cantón de Nuevo México, Centralist Republic of Mexico
Result	Mexican victory, dissolution of the Cantón

Belligerents
Centralist Republic of Mexico	Cantón de Nuevo México

Commanders and leaders
Manuel Armijo	José María González; Pablo Montoya

The Río Arriba Rebellion, also known as the Chimayó Rebellion, was an 1837 Pueblo-Hispano popular revolt in New Mexico which succeeded in briefly placing José María González and Pablo Montoya as governor of Mexico's Santa Fe de Nuevo México territory. González and Montoya were both Taos Pueblo Indigenous and led the independent Cantón de Nuevo México, also known as the Junta Popular, which was the most ethnically inclusive government in the history of New Mexico. They became the only Pueblo rulers in the history of New Mexico since Po'pay and Luis Tupatu of the Pueblo confederation.

José María González was from Chimayó and replaced unpopular Mexican governor Albino Pérez before his replacement by Montoya. Both González and Pérez were killed during the rebellion, but Montoya would survive to lead the Taos Revolt ten years later. The revolt underlined how increased isolation from Mexico City combined with "Mexico's declarations of political equality for all ethnic groups" increased Pueblo and Hispano cooperation in Mexican New Mexico—"the two groups ousted the governor and briefly established an Independent state—the Cantón—with an Indian serving as its governor.

== Background ==
Governor Pérez had arrived from central Mexico in 1835. The Pérez administration was opposed by the people and especially by the inhabitants of the northern part of the territory, who resented the "outsider" forced upon them by President Santa Anna. Their dissatisfaction was exacerbated when, following Santa Anna's defeat in Texas, the Mexican government drafted a constitution that tightened administration and tax-collection and imposed property qualifications on political participation. New Mexicans assumed that Pérez would attempt to levy the taxes and completely restructure the regional political system in accordance with the new constitution.

Other grievances included Pérez's reinstatement of Francisco Sarracino, a former governor who had been suspended for fraud from his position as subcomisario (a customs official); Pérez's appointment of a civil servant named Ramón Abreu as prefect when others thought they were better candidates; Pérez's failure to rein in customs officials who defrauded American traders on the Santa Fe Trail, some of whom lived in Taos in Northern New Mexico; and the inadequate food and bad conditions endured by men forced to serve in the militia against the Navajo and Apache. Some may also have resented his adultery (he openly had a relationship with his housekeeper, his wife being in Mexico City) and his wealth and luxurious possessions, as most New Mexicans were poor.

Opposition to Pérez increased, with his opponents circulating rumors of enormous taxes. The Departmental Assembly's list of three nominees for the next gubernatorial term did not include him. Opposition culminated in the summer of 1837, with the spark that set off the rebellion having to do with the alcalde (mayor) of Santa Cruz de la Cañada, Juan José Esquibel. Esquibel had accepted a bribe from a relative to release him from jail when charged with a "grave crime" and had defied Pérez's order to pay a fine and return his relative to jail. Then Esquibel supported two merchants against a man who had documentation that they owed him money. Pérez's appointee as prefect, Ramón Abreu, suspended Esquibel and on learning of the bribe, had him put in jail in irons. At the end of July a mob freed Esquibel, and he organized a rebellion.

== Revolt ==
The Centralist Republic with the separatist movements generated by the dissolution of the Federal Republic. Area in rebellion Area claimed by the Republics of Texas and the Rio Grande Area not in rebellion

On August 1, rebels from the northern New Mexican communities gathered at Santa Cruz de la Cañada (near Chimayó) with Native Americans from the surrounding pueblos. They called themselves the Cantón (neighborhood or district). On August 3, their twelve leaders, including Esquibel, issued the following declaration:

For God and the Nation and the Faith of Jesus Christ! The principal points we defend are the following: 1. To be with God and the Nation and the Faith of Jesus Christ. 2. To defend our country until we shed every drop of our blood in order to obtain the victory we have in view. 3. Not to admit the Department Plan. 4. Not to admit any tax. 5. Not to admit any disorder desired by those who are attempting to procure it. God and the Nation! Encampment Santa Cruz de la Cañada, August 3, 1837.

When Pérez heard of the rebellion, he attempted to raise a militia of volunteers, but his call did not meet with an encouraging answer. On August 9, Pérez started for Santa Cruz with the troops at his command, meeting the rebels near San Ildefonso. Most of Pérez's men promptly abandoned him and joined the rebels. Pérez retreated to Santa Fe with the few men who remained loyal to him. Unable to find security in the capital, Pérez attempted to flee the city by night, but a group of Santo Domingo Indians intercepted and killed him. The rebels decapitated Pérez and returned his head to Santa Fe for public display. Secretary of the Department Jesús María Alarid, former interim governor and substitute district judge (Juez de Distrito Suplente) of District Court of the New Mexico Territory (Juzgado de Distrito del Territorio de Nuevo México) Santiago Abreú (one of Ramón's brothers), and approximately 20 officials from the Pérez government were also killed, some by mutilation. That same day, the rebels entered the capital and placed José Gonzales, a Genizaro (of Taos Pueblo and Pawnee ancestry) from Chimayo, in possession of the palace and as governor of the territory.

Initially the rebel government was widely popular in the Department, but it soon made enemies by committing atrocities in gaining power and confiscating the massacre victims' property (at the expense of not only their heirs but also their creditors). The ruling junta popular was contentious and indecisive, its minutes full of crossed-out sections. Meanwhile, in Santa Cruz, the Cantón did not dissolve, instead continuing to imprison people and threaten them with death, outside the control of Gonzales's government. In Taos, unrest broke out against the Catholic Church and its leader there, Padre Martínez, in early September.

== Counterrevolution ==
In the town of Tomé in southern New Mexico, the priest, Francisco Antonio de Madariaga, began agitating for a counterrevolution. On September 8, he and other "citizens who love their country" adopted the "Plan of Tomé", which named former governor Manuel Armijo to command their force. The 600-man army detachment of Santa Fe, which Gonzales had disbanded, reorganized and marched south to join Armijo. Armijo wrote to the Mexican authorities, explaining the situation, and then marched to Santa Fe. He met little resistance; indeed Gonzales, who had gone to Taos to visit his family, was arrested in Santa Fe on September 11, before Armijo's arrival on the 14th. While in Santa Fe, Armijo wrote to Mexico again, stating what he had done and asking for troops to complete his victory and re-establish peace.

A former mayor of Taos, Pablo Montoya, led a Cantón force of reportedly 3000 men on Santa Fe. Though Armijo had only about 1,000 soldiers, they were much better trained and equipped than the rebels, and Armijo negotiated a peace treaty that was signed September 21. The rebels surrendered Juan José Esquibel and three other men from Santa Cruz to be indicted, but Gonzales was released and the other rebels received amnesty.. Montoya would later be executed for his part in the Taos Rebellion.

In October, the rebellion flared up yet again in Las Truchas, east of Santa Cruz. Armijo ordered the execution of Esquibel and the three other prisoners, but to Armijo's anger, his subordinates postponed the execution. Armijo spent the next few months raising funds to feed and pay his soldiers, who were on the point of mutiny. In January 1838, federal troops from Zacatecas and Chihuahua arrived in response to Armijo's request, bringing his official appointment to the governorship..

On January 23, Armijo sent an ultimatum to the rebels in Truchas. The following day, when they did not surrender, he had his four prisoners executed. On the 27th he marched toward Santa Cruz, where Gonzales and Antonio Vigil of Truchas were gathering their forces to return to Santa Fe. The two armies met between Santa Cruz and Pojoaque, and Armijo's forces (commanded by Lt. Col. Cayetano Justiniani of the Veracruz dragoons) prevailed in the battle. Gonzales fled to Santa Cruz. Armijo's ordered him executed in the public square.

Armijo was to remain Governor of New Mexico through the Texan Santa Fe Expedition until 1844. He became Governor again in 1845 until he withdrew without a fight while New Mexico was taken over by the United States Army under the command of General Stephen W. Kearny in 1846.

== See also ==
- Cantón de Nuevo México
- José María González
- Pablo Montoya
- Revolts against the Centralist Republic of Mexico
- Taos Revolt
- History of New Mexico
- History of Mexico
- History of the United States
- Mexican Indian Wars
- Pueblo peoples
- Hispanos of New Mexico
- Centralist Republic of Mexico
- Republic of the Rio Grande
- California Revolt led by Juan Bautista Alvarado
- Republic of Yucatán
- Republic of Texas
- Pueblo Revolt
