= José Gonzales =

New Mexican politician

José María González

1st Governor of the Cantón de Nuevo México 11th Mexican Governor of Nuevo México
- In office 10 August 1837 – September 1837
- Preceded by: Albino Pérez (Santa Fe de Nuevo México)
- Succeeded by: Pablo Montoya

Personal details
- Born: José María Angél González
- Died: 27 January 1838 Santa Cruz, New Mexico
- Profession: Buffalo hunter, politician

José María Ángel González, sometimes spelled José María Ángel Gonzáles, was the governor of the independent Cantón de Nuevo México, also known as the Junta Popular, in the Río Arriba Rebellion in 1837. He was the first Pueblo elected governor of New Mexico, and the first Pueblo ruler of the polity since Po'pay and Luis Tupatu during the Pueblo republic (1680—1692).

González was Taos Pueblo, Genízaro, and Pawnee. González's federal republic of Pueblos and Hispanos was the ethnically inclusive in the history of New Mexico up to the 2010s. González was overthrown and replaced by Pablo Montoya as Cantón Governor after proposing the Cantón petition for annexation by the United States. González was the first and only duly-elected Governor of New Mexico to be Pueblo.

== Background ==
José María González was from Chimayó and was an accomplished buffalo hunter. González was illiterate and his democratic election marks the only time New Mexico elected an Indian to the governorship. González was likely born to a Genízaro and Pawnee father and Taos Pueblo mother, although his exact background is still debated by scholars, who compared his groundbreaking position to Benito Juárez a generation later. He replaced unpopular Mexican governor Albino Pérez before his replacement by Montoya. Both González and Pérez were killed during the rebellion, but Montoya would survive to lead the Taos Revolt ten years later. The revolt underlined how increased isolation from Mexico City combined with "Mexico's declarations of political equality for all ethnic groups" increased Pueblo and Hispano cooperation in Mexican New Mexico—"the two groups ousted the governor and briefly established an Independent state—the Cantón—with an Indian serving as its governor.

== Governor of New Mexico ==
When José González became Governor he floated a plan to invite foreigners to join the rebellion and annex New Mexico to the United States in return for support of the rebellion. This proposal weakened his support. The Taos Priest Antonio José Martínez was sympathetic to the revolt. Despite military superiority, the revolt failed when Pablo Montoya of Taos turned in González in return for amnesty for his faction.
