= Queen of Sin =

Queen of Sin may refer to:

- Queen of Sin and the Spectacle of Sodom and Gomorrha, a version of the title for Sodom and Gomorrah (1922 film)
- An image of Emma Peel and a scene from A Touch of Brimstone (from The Avengers TV series)
- Maria Gertrudis Barceló, known as the Mexican "Queen of Sin"
