= Santiago Abreu =

Santiago Abreu may refer to

- Santiago Abréu, governor of Santa Fe de Nuevo México (New Mexico) from 1832 to 1833.
- Santiago Polanco-Abreu, a Resident Commissioner of Puerto Rico.
