= Joel Titus Case =

American journalist and minister (1802–1868)

Joel Titus Case (June 30, 1802 – June 10, 1868) was an American newspaper editor and minister.

Case was born in Ohio and graduated from Yale College in 1828. After leaving College Case was an Editor in Mobile, Ala., and subsequently in Galveston, Texas. In 1841 Case accompanied the famous Texan Santa Fe Expedition as geological journalist; but through the treachery of the officers in command of his company, Case was captured by the Mexicans and carried to Mexico, where he was imprisoned three months in chains. Case effected his escape and, returning to Mobile, resumed his editorial labors. In 1848 Case returned to his native State, and having pursued a course of theological study, received ordination in the Presbyterian Church (O.S.). Case began his ministry in Texas, but his health failing, Case engaged in teaching, and was so occupied until his death, at Victoria, Texas, June 10, 1868, aged 65 years.
