= Carnuel, New Mexico =

- Census-designated place
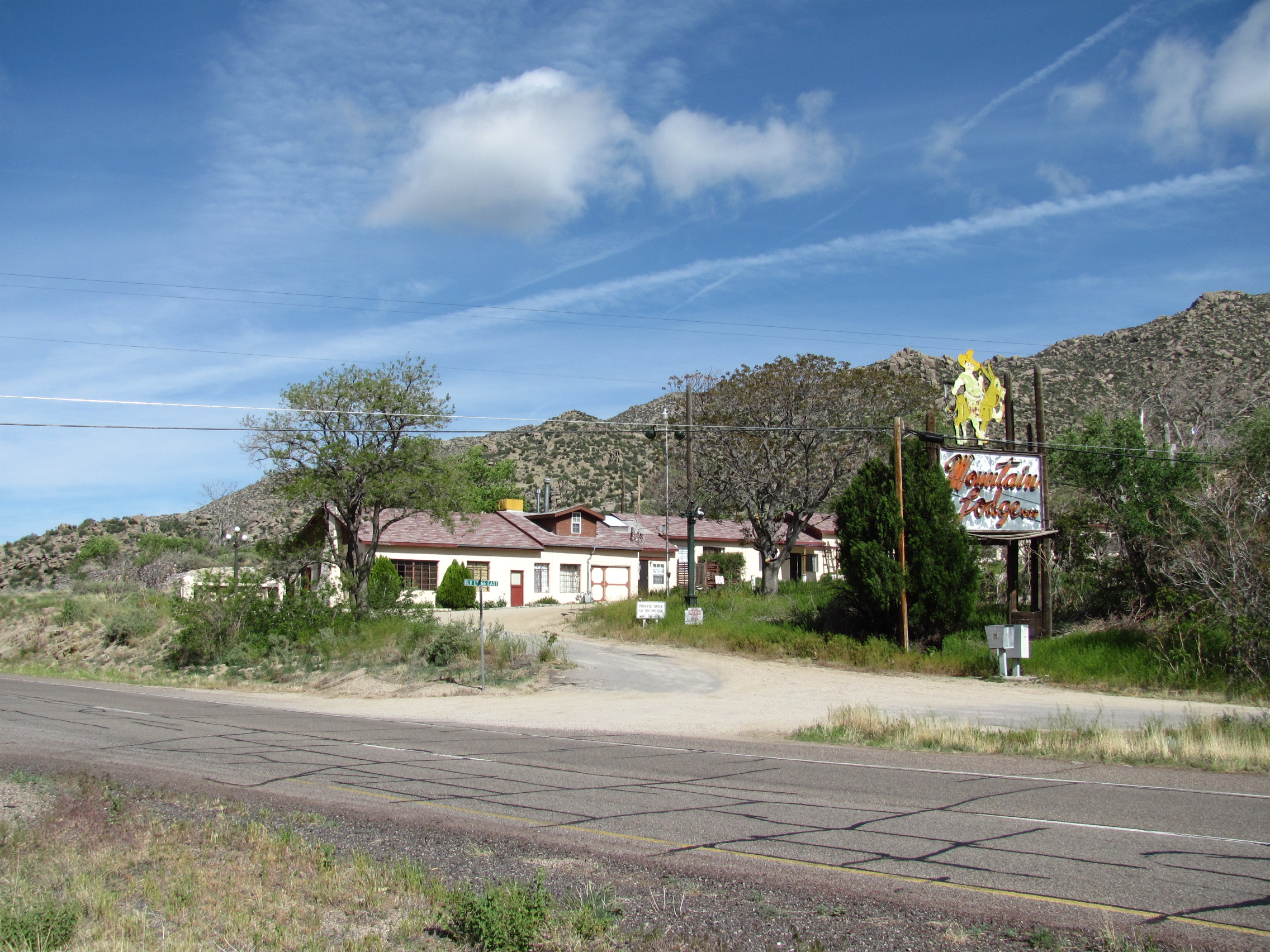
- Old Mountain Lodge on Old Route 66

- Location of Carnuel, New Mexico

- Location in the United States
- Coordinates: 35°03′39″N 106°27′31″W
- Country: United States
- State: New Mexico
- County: Bernalillo

Area
  - Total: 5.35 sq mi (13.85 km^{2})
  - Land: 5.32 sq mi (13.77 km^{2})
  - Water: 0.031 sq mi (0.08 km^{2})
- Elevation: 5,807 ft (1,770 m)

Population (2020)
  - Total: 1,019
  - Density: 191.6/sq mi (73.98/km^{2})
- Time zone: UTC-7 (Mountain (MST))
  - Summer (DST): UTC-6 (MDT)
- Area code: 505
- FIPS code: 35-12430
- GNIS feature ID: 2407968

Carnuel is a census-designated place (CDP) in Bernalillo County, New Mexico, United States. As of the 2020 census, Carnuel had a population of 1,019. It is part of the Albuquerque Metropolitan Statistical Area.

== Name ==
Robert Hixson Julyan reports that name of the community, which has been spelled both Carnuel and Carnué, likely derives from the Tiwa word for "badger place." This hypothesis is supported by indigenous residents.

== History ==
Carnuel (full name San Miguel de Loredo de Carnué) is 20 kilometres (12 mi) east of the original center of the city of Albuquerque. The town was created in 1763 to defend Albuquerque from the raids of Comanche, Kiowa, and Plains Apache American Indians. The town is located at the mouth of Tijeras Canyon, a strategic and natural corridor between the hostile Indians of the Great Plains and the Spanish settlements of the Rio Grande valley. Nineteen men some with families, comprised the first settlers at Carnuel. They were mostly from the lower castas of Spanish society, "mestizo" (“half blood,” mixed race Indians and Spanish) and genízaros (Indians who lived among the Spanish and had adopted some elements of Hispanic culture). For the mestizo and genízaros the attraction to settle at Carnuel and other genízaro settlements was the opportunity to own land through a land grant from the New Mexican government.

Apache raiders killed several people in the area and the survivors abandoned the settlement in 1771. Carnuel was resettled in 1819 by descendants of the original settlers plus additional landless mestizos. Twenty-two families were given land at Carnuel and another 22 received land at San Antonio, a community about 10 kilometres (6.2 mi) northeast of Carnuel. By that time New Mexico had made peace with the Comanche and the threat to the eastern frontiers of the colony had decreased, making the settlement feasible. The genízaro heritage continued to influence land and water usage rights in the Carnuel land grant into the 21st century. Also within the original area of the land grant are the village of Tijeras and Cedar Crest CDP (census designated place).

== Geography ==
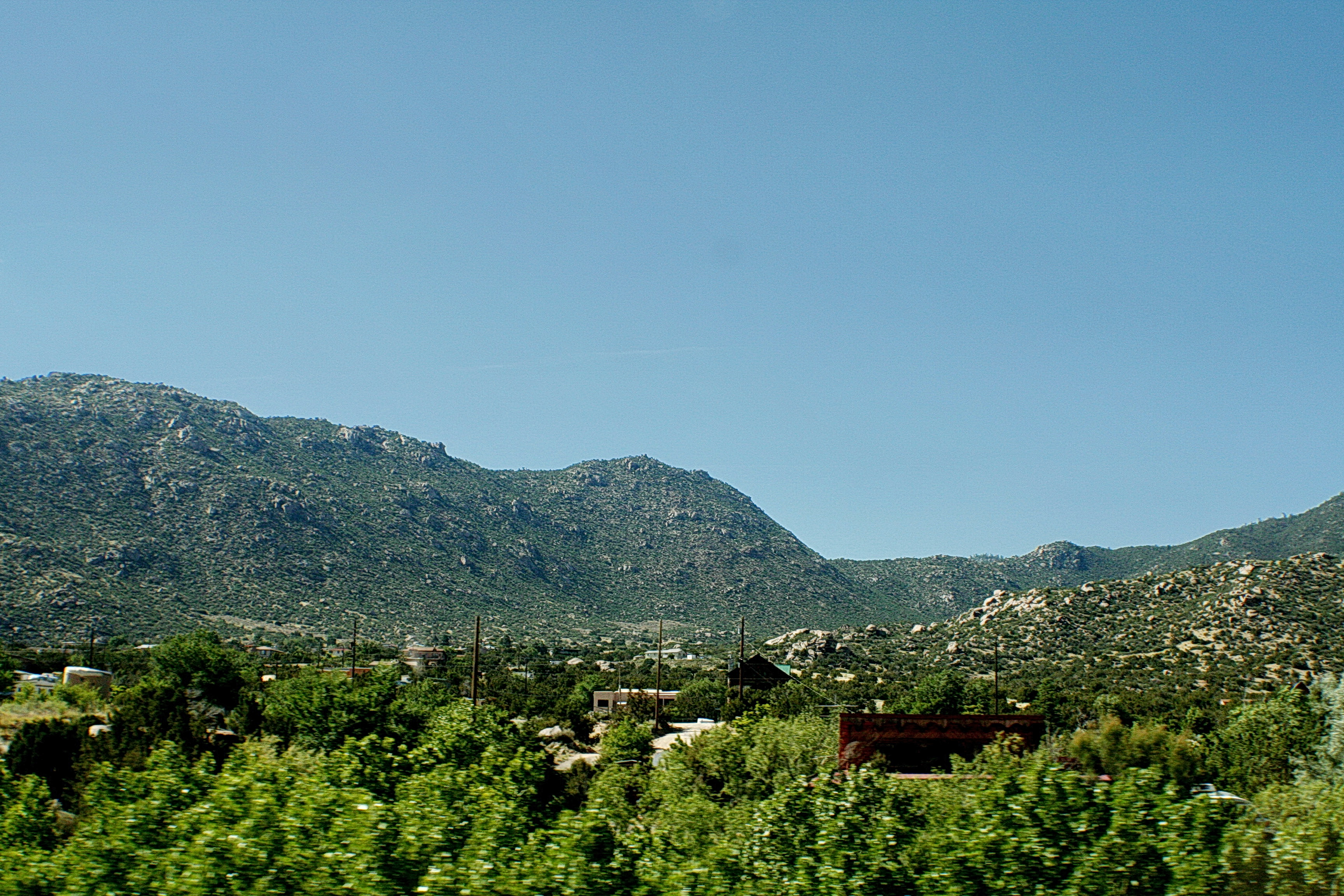
Carnuel in Tijeras Canyon.

According to the United States Census Bureau, the CDP has a total area of 5.42 square miles (14.05 km^{2}), of which 0.031 square miles (0.08 km^{2}), or 0.56%, is water.

=== Climate ===
Carnuel has a climate similar to that of nearby Albuquerque, which is BSk in the Köppen Classification and BSak (steppe, hot summers, cool winters) in the Trewartha climate classification. The climate borders on being BW (desert). More than one half of the annual precipitation of 9.5 inches (240 mm) is received from July to August.

== Demographics ==
Historical population
Census	Pop.	Note	%±
2020	1,019		—
U.S. Decennial Census

As of the census of 2000, there were 872 people, 371 households, and 244 families residing in the CDP. The population density was 354.0 people per square mile (136.7 people/km^{2}). There were 398 housing units at an average density of 161.6 per square mile (62.4/km^{2}). The racial makeup of the CDP was 69.27% White, 0.34% African American, 1.72% Native American, 27.06% from other races, and 1.61% from two or more races. Hispanic or Latino of any race were 51.15% of the population.

There were 371 households, out of which 25.1% had children under the age of 18 living with them, 50.4% were married couples living together, 8.9% had a female householder with no husband present, and 34.0% were non-families. 29.1% of all households were made up of individuals, and 10.2% had someone living alone who was 65 years of age or older. The average household size was 2.32 and the average family size was 2.83.

In the CDP, the population was spread out, with 20.9% under the age of 18, 6.1% from 18 to 24, 27.3% from 25 to 44, 30.3% from 45 to 64, and 15.5% who were 65 years of age or older. The median age was 42 years. For every 100 females, there were 106.1 males. For every 100 females age 18 and over, there were 111.0 males.

The median income for a household in the CDP was $37,813, and the median income for a family was $46,250. Males had a median income of $38,281 versus $21,532 for females. The per capita income for the CDP was $18,553. About 9.2% of families and 12.3% of the population were below the poverty line, including 11.6% of those under age 18 and 12.6% of those age 65 or over.

== Education ==
It is zoned to Albuquerque Public Schools.

== See also ==
- List of census-designated places in New Mexico
