= Santiago Abréu =

American politician

8th Mexican Governor of New Mexico
- In office 1832–1833
- Preceded by: José Antonio Chaves
- Succeeded by: Francisco Sarracino

Personal details
- Died: 8 August 1837 Santa Fe
- Profession: Politician

Santiago Abréu (died 8 August 1837) was governor of Santa Fe de Nuevo México (New Mexico) from 1832 to 1833. He was a victim of the Chimayó Rebellion of 1837. He was dismembered before being allowed to die.

Santiago Abreú was deputy to the Congress in Mexico City from 1825 to 1826, and was appointed governor in 1832–33.

He was appointed as substitute district judge in 1831 (Juez de Distrito suplente), although he held the position until 1834, just a few months after the resignation of Jose María Nájera, judge principal (Juez de Distrito propietario) of the District Court of the Territory of New Mexico (Juzgado de Distrito del Territorio de Nuevo México), from his position and his subsequent departure to Mexico City. During his assignment, he learned about the processing of criminal trials, mainly those related to merchandise smuggling, which constituted a crime that had to be investigated and resolved by federal law enforcement authorities in Mexico, as the national customs office was located in Santa Fe.

Abréu was a supporter of Governor Albino Pérez, who had become extremely unpopular for enforcing the decisions of the centrist government of President Antonio López de Santa Anna, which included reduction of local political control and imposition of new taxes. During the rebellion against Pérez which broke out on 7 August 1837, Abréu was captured near the rancho of Cerrillos and imprisoned in Santo Domingo. The next day he was taken from jail by a mob that tore off his penis and decapitated him. His brother Ramón Abréu, publisher of the newspaper El Crepúsculo de la Libertad, was also assassinated in this rebellion. The assassins were Pueblo warriors from Santo Domingo, who were also responsible for the death of governor Pérez. However, in the aftermath of the rebellion they were treated carefully to avoid further trouble.

His death also resulted in the de facto closure of the District Court, which was completed in 1841, with a decree by Antonio López de Santa Anna, which determined the closure of all federal courts and tribunals in Mexico.
