= Santa Cruz, New Mexico =

Santa Cruz, New Mexico Kañą̈ḏaˀin Núˀu (Tewa)
- CDP
- Nicknames: La Villa Nueva, or La Cañada
- Location of Santa Cruz, New Mexico
- Coordinates: 35°59′48″N 106°01′58″W
- Country: United States
- State: New Mexico
- County: Santa Fe
- Founded: 1695-04-21

Area
  - Total: 0.62 sq mi (1.61 km^{2})
  - Land: 0.62 sq mi (1.61 km^{2})
  - Water: 0 sq mi (0.00 km^{2})
- Elevation: 5,775 ft (1,760 m)

Population (2020)
  - Total: 416
  - Density: 670.4/sq mi (258.83/km^{2})
- Time zone: UTC-7 (Mountain (MST))
  - Summer (DST): UTC-6 (MDT)
- ZIP code: 87567
- Area code: 505
- FIPS code: 35-70460
- GNIS feature ID: 2409277

Santa Cruz, historically known as Santa Cruz de la Cañada (Tewa: Kañą̈ḏaˀin Núˀu), is a census-designated place (CDP) in Santa Fe County, New Mexico, United States. It is part of the Santa Fe, New Mexico Metropolitan Statistical Area. As of the 2020 census, Santa Cruz had a population of 416.

== History ==
=== Overview ===
The area that was later to be occupied by the village of Santa Cruz de la Cañada is located 25 miles northwest of Santa Fe, New Mexico, and a half-mile east of Española, New Mexico in the valley of the Santa Cruz River half-mile from its confluence with the Rio Grande. Upon the arrival of Spanish conquistadors in 1540, the Santa Cruz area was inhabited by Tewa people, descendants of the Ancestral Puebloans. After Diego de Vargas reoccupied the region following the Pueblo Revolt) of 1692 and 1696, southern Tewa (Tano) relocated to the area from the Galisteo Basin.

=== Colonial period ===
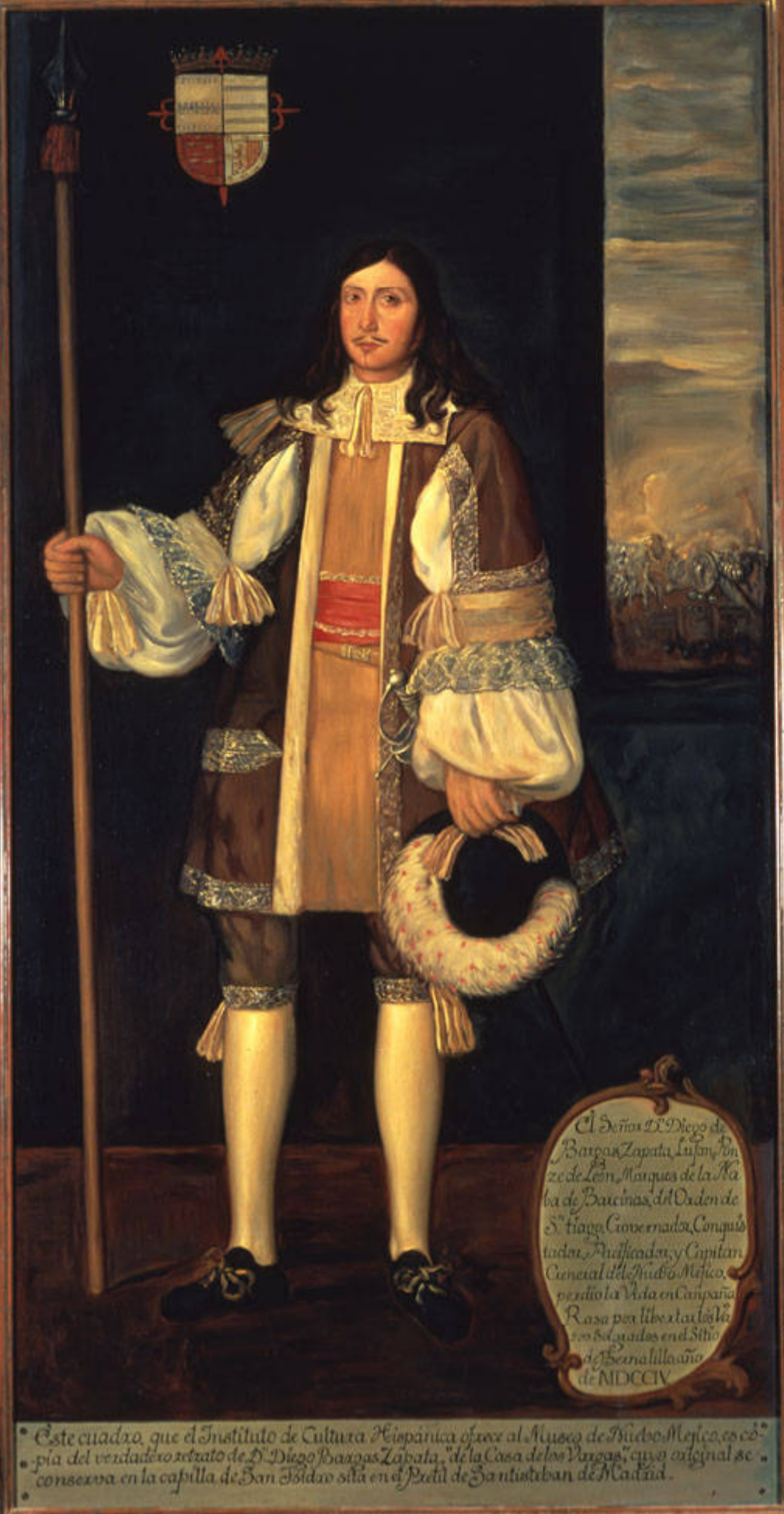
Diego de Vargas (oil on canvas) by Julio Barrera, from the collection of the Palace of the Governors, date unknown.

The nearby, and unsuccessful, Spanish colony at San Gabriel established by the explorer Juan de Oñate at Ohkay Owingeh in 1598 produced Spanish haciendas and ranchos in the vicinity. During the Pueblo Revolt of 1680, Hispanic settlers were forced to leave the area. In 1695, following the Reconquest of 1692-1694 and the second Pueblo Revolt in 1696, Governor and Captain General of New Mexico, Don Diego de Vargas reestablished the Hispanic settlement. It was established as a new Spanish villa for those that had arrived from Mexico City as settlers and participants in the military campaigns during the reconquest. It was named Villa Nueva de Santa Cruz de los Españoles Mejicanos del Rey Nuestro Señor Carlos Segundo (The New Town of the Holy Cross of Mexican Spaniards under the King Our Lord Charles II). It later shortened simply to Santa Cruz de la Cañada (la Cañada translates as "a small river or creek valley").

The new Hispanic community was the second villa established by the Spanish in New Mexico and was one of only three established during the colonial period, the first being Santa Fe and the last, Albuquerque. The area surrounding Santa Cruz de la Cañada was described during this period as containing many copious fruit orchards irrigated by the Santa Cruz River and its tributaries.

The original population of Tano Pueblo Natives in the area were at first grouped by Diego de Vargas into two pueblos with the same names (San Lazaro and San Cristobal) as previously established in this Galisteo Basin, but were relocated from the area by the end of the 17th century, following the second Pueblo Revolt. Many of the Tewa People left the area to join the Hopi people and became the Hopi-Tewas at First Mesa.

The existing Santa Cruz Catholic Church building in the Holy Cross Parish was originally constructed between 1733 and 1748 to replace a structure that was reported to be in danger of collapsing and beyond repair, although the Archdiocese of Santa Fe archives do not have a record either that Santa Cruz was a parish or that there was a church building existing at that time. The first baptism in the community was recorded on September 15, 1710. Artwork in the church has been contributed by well known local Santeros. The church is currently maintained by the Sons of the Holy Family and is open to tourists and visitors Monday through Friday.

=== Mexican period ===
Throughout the seventeenth and eighteenth centuries, frontier settlement at Santa Cruz de la Cañada had produced a rustic and self-reliant population. With news of Mexican independence in 1821, the town was hardly affected with the exception of the new government's laws and office appointments. Trade with the United States had been forbidden under the former Spanish government, but now enterprising Anglo-Americans began pouring down the Santa Fe Trail, bringing a new prosperity to the region

The Revolt of 1837 was centered in Santa Cruz de la Cañada. In 1835, Mexico's new autocratic and unpopular provincial governor, Albino Pérez, was met on his arrival in Santa Fe with suspicion and opposition, on the basis of rumors of aggressive new tax collections. Following his defeat in Texas, President Antonio López de Santa Anna, with his "Siete Leyes," was moving toward government centralization, an increased ability to tax, and eventually to military dictatorship.

When Pérez had Juan José Esquibel, the alcalde (mayor) of Santa Cruz, jailed in 1837, influential members of the community raised a militia. Pérez led a force in response which was defeated by the rebels at Black Mesa near San Ildefonso Pueblo before he reached Santa Cruz. The rebels beheaded Pérez and killed some of his government officials, then appointed genizaro José González as new governor. Later, utilizing the support of Anglo merchants in Santa Fe, New Mexico native Manuel Armijo defeated the rebels at Puertocito Pojoaque, east of Santa Cruz de la Cañada.

=== Territorial period ===
A Battle of Canada map, featuring the presidio of Santa Cruz at the top.

The arrival of the American Army under Stephen W. Kearny in 1846 ended the twenty-five years of Mexican rule in New Mexico. In January 1847, however, rebellious forces murdered the first U.S. assigned Governor, Charles Bent, at his home in Taos, beginning the Taos Revolt. Occupying forces in Santa Fe quickly moved an army north under Colonel Sterling Price to stop the rebellion. Colonel Price's troops first met armed resistance at Santa Cruz against a poorly armed and trained force of rebels which they subdued with cannon. The skirmish would become known as the Battle of Cañada.

=== Statehood through present ===
Santa Cruz has continued to maintain much of its traditions and history especially through the Catholic Church. The mission church, built after the first fell into disrepair in the early eighteenth century, remains active and vibrant with a large and dedicated congregation. The arrival of the railroad in the 1880s brought the growth of a new town named Española. The growth of the new city eventually encompassed the old Spanish community and has largely concealed it. Once considered the second most important settlement in New Mexico, the town is now masked by its popular tourist neighbors Taos and Santa Fe.

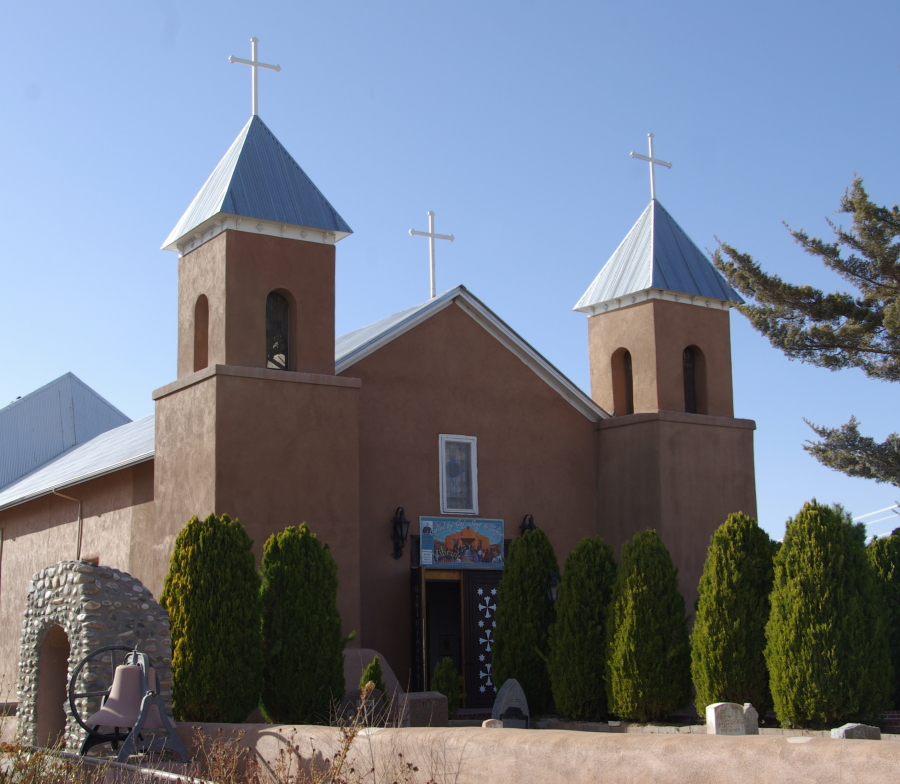
The Catholic church in Santa Cruz, probably built in 1733 or not long after, is the biggest and has been considered the best mission church in New Mexico.

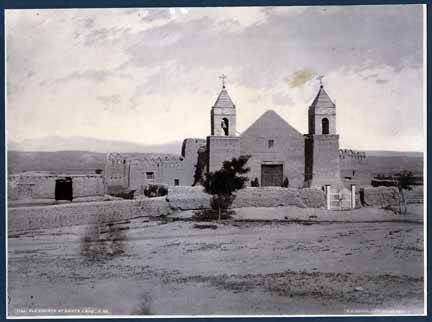
The Santa Cruz church in 1881. Photo by William Henry Jackson.

== Geography ==
According to the United States Census Bureau, the CDP has a total area of 0.7 square mile (1.8 km^{2}), all land.

== Demographics ==
Historical population
Census	Pop.	Note	%±
2020	416		—
U.S. Decennial Census

As of the census of 2000, there were 423 people, 147 households, and 108 families residing in the CDP. The population density was 608.3 inhabitants per square mile (234.9/km^{2}). There were 172 housing units at an average density of 247.4 per square mile (95.5/km^{2}). The racial makeup of the CDP was 71.63% White, 0.95% Native American, 0.24% Asian, 0.47% Pacific Islander, 24.35% from other races, and 2.36% from two or more races. Hispanic or Latino of any race were 91.73% of the population.

There were 147 households, out of which 47.6% had children under the age of 18 living with them, 36.1% were married couples living together, 32.0% had a female householder with no husband present, and 26.5% were non-families. 21.1% of all households were made up of individuals, and 6.1% had someone living alone who was 65 years of age or older. The average household size was 2.88 and the average family size was 3.33.

In the CDP, the population was spread out, with 35.5% under the age of 18, 13.2% from 18 to 24, 25.1% from 25 to 44, 18.4% from 45 to 64, and 7.8% who were 65 years of age or older. The median age was 25 years. For every 100 females, there were 97.7 males. For every 100 females age 18 and over, there were 90.9 males.

The median income for a household in the CDP was $28,750, and the median income for a family was $21,438. Males had a median income of $23,924 versus $10,833 for females. The per capita income for the CDP was $10,278. About 23.9% of families and 22.9% of the population were below the poverty line, including 35.0% of those under age 18 and none of those age 65 or over.

== Education ==
It is in Española Public Schools. The comprehensive public high school is Española Valley High School.

In 1962 there was a school in Santa Cruz; the science room had been destroyed after an explosion occurred, so there were efforts to establish a new science room.
