= Santa Fe de Nuevo México =

Provincial kingdom of New Spain (1598–1821); territory of Mexico (1821–48)

- Kingdom of the Spanish Empire and New Spain (1598–1821); Province of the First Mexican Empire (1821–23); Territory of the First Mexican Republic (1823–1835); Department of the Centralist Republic of Mexico (1835-1846); Territory of the Second Federal Republic of Mexico (1846-1848)
- 1598–1680; 1692-1837; 1837-1847 (de facto); 1598-1848 (de jure)
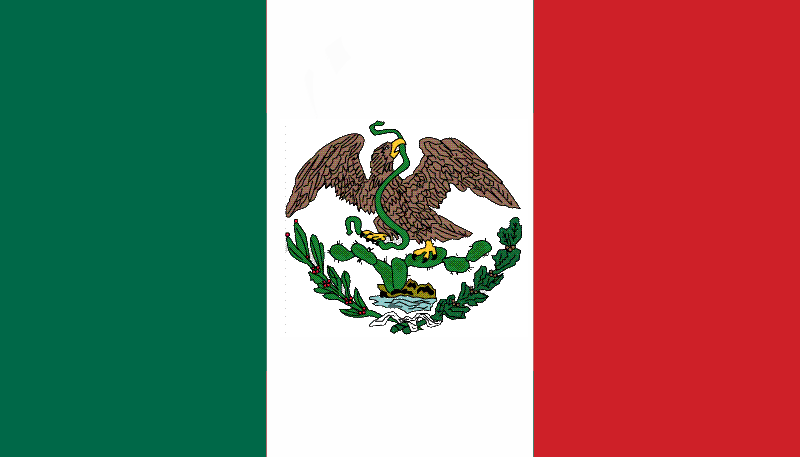
- Flag Flag of the Mexican Republic

- Capital: Santa Fe
- Area
  - 1842: 603,345 km^{2} (232,953 sq mi)
- Population
  - 1842: 63,510
- Government
- Spanish governors
  - 1598–1610 (first): Juan de Oñate
  - 1818–1822 (last): Facundo Melgares
- Mexican governors
  - July – November 1822 (first): Francisco Xavier Chávez
  - January – February 1847 (last): Pablo Montoya
- History
  - Oñate expedition: 1598 1598
  - Pueblo Revolt: 1680
  - Return of the Spanish: 1692 – 1696
  - Mexican Independence: 1821
  - Río Arriba Rebellion: 1837
  - Mexican–American War: 1846 – 1847
  - Taos Revolt: 1847
  - Mexican Cession: 1848
  - Disestablished: 1848
  - New Mexico Statehood: 1912
Preceded by
Taos Pueblo
Acoma Pueblo
Hopi Pueblo
Zuni Pueblo
Laguna Pueblo
San Felipe Pueblo
Santo Domingo Pueblo
Santa Clara Pueblo
Nambé Pueblo
Ohkay Owingeh
Pueblo of Pojoaque
San Ildefonso Pueblo
Isleta Pueblo
Santa Ana Pueblo
Pueblo of Tesuque
Pueblo of Sandia
Jemez Pueblo
Picuris Pueblo
Piro Pueblo
All Pueblo Council
Cantón de Nuevo México
Succeeded by
All Pueblo Council
Cantón de Nuevo México
U.S. provisional government of New Mexico
All Pueblo Council
- Today part of: Southwestern United States: Arizona; Colorado; Kansas; Nevada; New Mexico; Oklahoma; Texas
- While the Mexican territory theoretically existed until the Mexican Cession under the Treaty of Guadalupe Hidalgo on February 2, 1848, the New Mexico Territory had been annexed under U.S. military occupation in September 1846, after the surrender by Mexican interim governor Juan Bautista Vigil y Alarid to General Stephen W. Kearny.

Santa Fe de Nuevo México (English: Holy Faith of New Mexico; shortened as Nuevo México or Nuevo Méjico, and translated as New Mexico in English) was a province of the Spanish Empire and New Spain, and later a territory of independent Mexico. Under the 1824 Constitution of Mexico, it became the federally administered Territory of New Mexico. The first capital was San Juan de los Caballeros from 1598 until 1610, and from 1610 onward the capital was La Villa Real de la Santa Fe de San Francisco de Asís.

The name of "New Mexico", the capital in Santa Fe, the gubernatorial office at the Palace of the Governors, vecino citizen-soldiers, and rule of law were retained as the New Mexico Territory and later state of New Mexico became part of the United States. The Mexican citizenry, primarily consisting of Hispano and Pueblos, became citizens of the United States as a result of the Treaty of Guadalupe Hidalgo (1848) but the Navajo, Apache, and Comanche peoples were denied citizenship until the Indian Citizen Act of 1924.

Nuevo México is often incorrectly believed to have taken its name from the post-independent nation of Mexico. But as early as 1561 (260 years before Mexican independence), Spanish colonial explorers used el Nuevo México to refer to Cíbola, cities of wealth reported to exist far to the north of the recently conquered Aztec Empire. This name also evoked the Mexica people's accounts of their ancestral origin in Aztlán to the north before their migration to Mexico centuries prior. The Nahuatl-language history of the Mexica people, the Crónica Mexicayotl, dated to 1609, makes this identification explicit, describing how the Mexica left "their home there in Old Mexico Aztlan Quinehuayan Chicomoztoc, which today they call New Mexico (yancuic mexico)."

== Geography ==
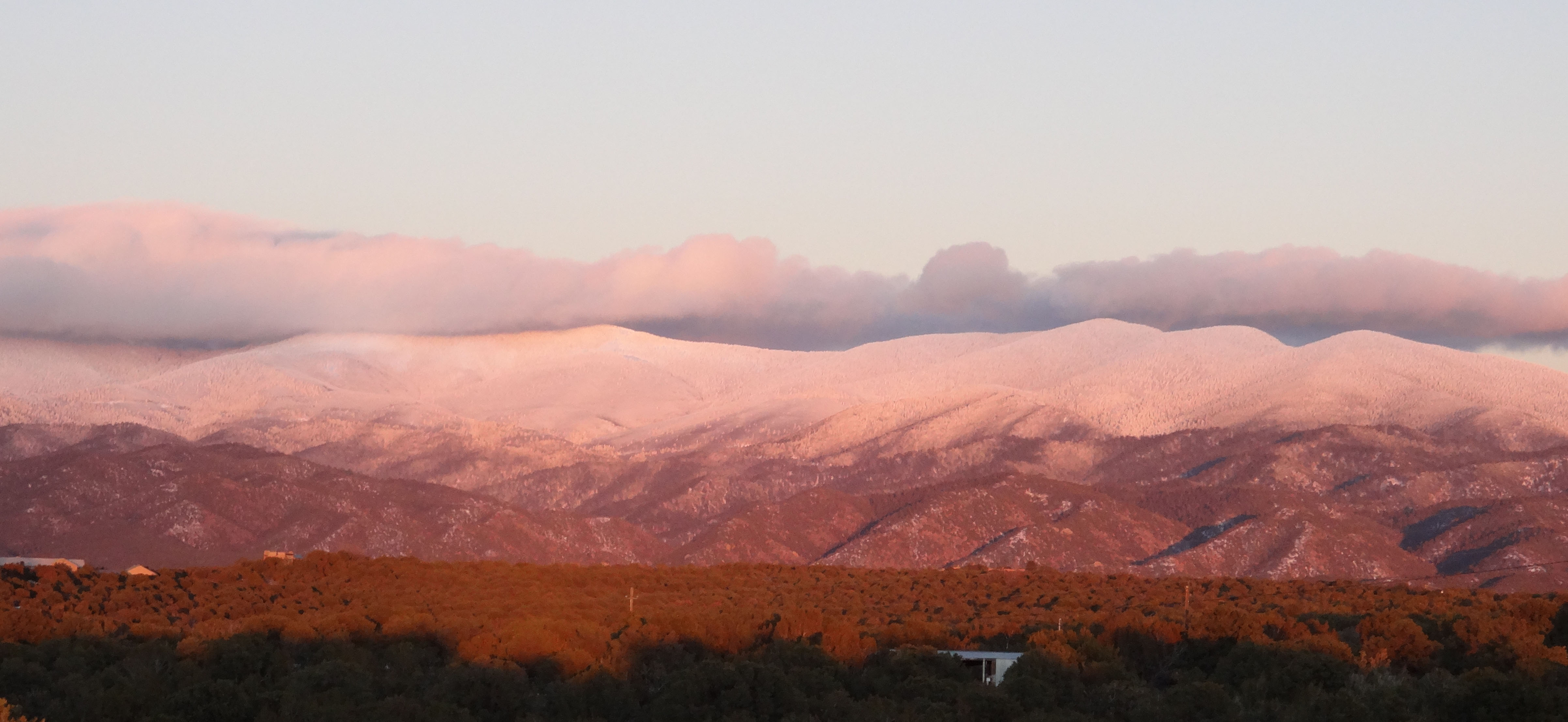
Sangre de Cristo Mountains to the east of Santa Fe: a winter sunset after a snowfall

Nuevo México was centered on the upper valley of the Rio Grande (Río Bravo del Norte): from the crossing point of Oñate on the river south of Ciudad Juárez, it extended north to the Colorado River, encompassing an area that included most of the present-day American state of New Mexico and sections of Texas, Colorado, Kansas, and the Oklahoma panhandle. Actual Spanish settlements were centered at Santa Fe, and extended north to Taos pueblo and south to Albuquerque (Tiguex). Its provincial capital was in the foothills of the Sangre de Cristo Mountains at the ancient city of La Villa Real de la Santa Fe de San Francisco de Asís (modern-day Santa Fe). At its furthest extent, its reach extended eastward throughout the Llano Estacado due to early exploration by Francisco Vázquez de Coronado, and westward into Las Vegas Springs due to Antonio Armijo's later expeditions. Its outposts were widespread, throughout what is now the Southwestern United States. From the time of Camino Real de Tierra Adentro, which eventually connected to the Old Spanish Trail, Santa Fe Trail, and the subsequent Atchison, Topeka and Santa Fe Railway.

== History ==
=== Spanish colonial province ===
==== 16th century ====
In 1536, the explorers Esteban de Dorantes, Álvar Núñez Cabeza de Vaca, and others, partook in an ill-fated expedition known as the Narváez Expedition—tasked with setting up colonial settlements in North America—including in New Mexico, where Estevancio is believed to have been killed by the Zuni. The first successful expedition occurred in 1539; Friar Marcos de Niza led the expedition north from Mexico City to a Zuni settlement, returning to Mexico claiming he saw a city made of gold. Given these rumors, the Viceroy of New Spain sent Governor Francisco Vélazquez de Coronado on a subsequent expedition in 1540 to find the riches. The so-called Coronado Expedition was composed of over 300 Spaniards and Europeans, along with a contingent of over 1000 Central-Mexican indigenous peoples. Coronado took his expedition through Sonora, crossing into modern-day Arizona and later New Mexico; over the course of two years, He made contact with numerous Pueblo and Plains peoples and made it as far north as Wichita, Kansas. The Coronado's forces occupied a Pueblo village in their quest for gold, from here, tensions continued to worsen until a war broke out between the Pueblo and Spanish in a conflict known as the Tiguex War. Coronado's forces engaged in a violent war with the Pueblo people, the Spanish were ultimately victorious after a costly and bloody campaign. After failing to find the fabled riches of Niza's expedition, Coronado withdrew his forces in 1542, leaving behind three Franciscan monks. The region was ignored by Spanish authorities until conquistador Don Juan de Oñate's expedition in 1598.

In 1598 the All Pueblo Council gave the Spanish Empire's Oñate expedition permission to settle the Rio Grande Valley and swore a loyalty oath to the Spanish crown. On July 12, 1598, Oñate established the New Spain colony of Santa Fe de Nuevo Méjico (New Mexico) at the new village of San Juan de los Caballeros adjacent to the Ohkay Owingeh Pueblo at the confluence of the Río Bravo (Rio Grande) and the Río Chama. He too was unable to find the fabled riches Niza spoke of. As governor, Oñate mingled with the Pueblo people and was responsible for the establishment of Spanish rule in the area. Oñate served as the first governor of the Nuevo México Province from 1598 to 1610.

Oñate's expedition represented the first Spanish expedition since the Coronado Expedition that was sanctioned by the Spanish crown. Unlike the previous expeditions of Esteban and Coronado, the Spanish received permission to settle in the area the All Pueblo Council. It took the expedition two years to be organized before it set off from Mexico City in 1598, it was composed of 500 men. Though the crown had sanctioned the expedition, they were not financing it. Oñate came from a wealthy, aristocratic family whose wealth was built on the Mexican mining industry, he personally financed the expedition. The expeditionary force did not include any Spanish soldiers, although 130 of the participants were armed. Despite his family wealth, Oñate soon ran out of funds; by the time the expedition settled the town of San Gabriel de Yungue-Ouinge (capital of the province from 1601 to 1610), they were nearly entirely financed by the crown. Oñate's expedition successfully established permanent Spanish settlement. Part of Spanish colonial settlement efforts included the construction of the El Camino Real (the Royal Road) through the valleys of New Mexico.

==== 17th century ====
Oñate's tenure as colonial governor was marked by immense cruelty to the indigenous people in Nuevo México, he was removed from his position by the King of Spain and subsequently charged with and found guilty of cruelty, immorality, and false reporting; he returned to Spain for the remainder of his life. Following the ouster of Oñate as Governor of Nuevo México, the king appointed Pedro de Peralta. Peralta established the city of Santa Fe in 1610, he subsequently moved all administrative functions to the new city, making it the provincial capital.

Most of the Spanish missions in Nuevo México were established during the early 17th century with varying degrees of success and failure, oftentimes building directly atop ancient pueblo ruins, and in the centers of pueblos. The encounter between different worlds—Native and Spanish—took place all across New Mexico, but especially at the missions. They were small communities, centers of Spanish religious and economic life, and a permanent intrusion into Pueblo ways and beliefs. Here the clash of faiths, customs, and people was immediate, personal, and sometimes bitter and violent. At missions across New Mexico, Franciscan priests baptized thousands of Native Americans in the 1600s, mostly Pueblo people. The missionaries commanded new converts to take part in Catholic services and rituals. They also destroyed Pueblo religious objects, banned ceremonies, and persecuted holy men. Despite the spread of Catholicism across the province, Pueblo men and women worshiped in secret and their traditional faith endured. By 1668, Juan de Medrano y Mesía became governor of the province, holding this position until 1671. His tenure was marked most notably by Apache raids in the region.

==== Pueblo Revolt ====
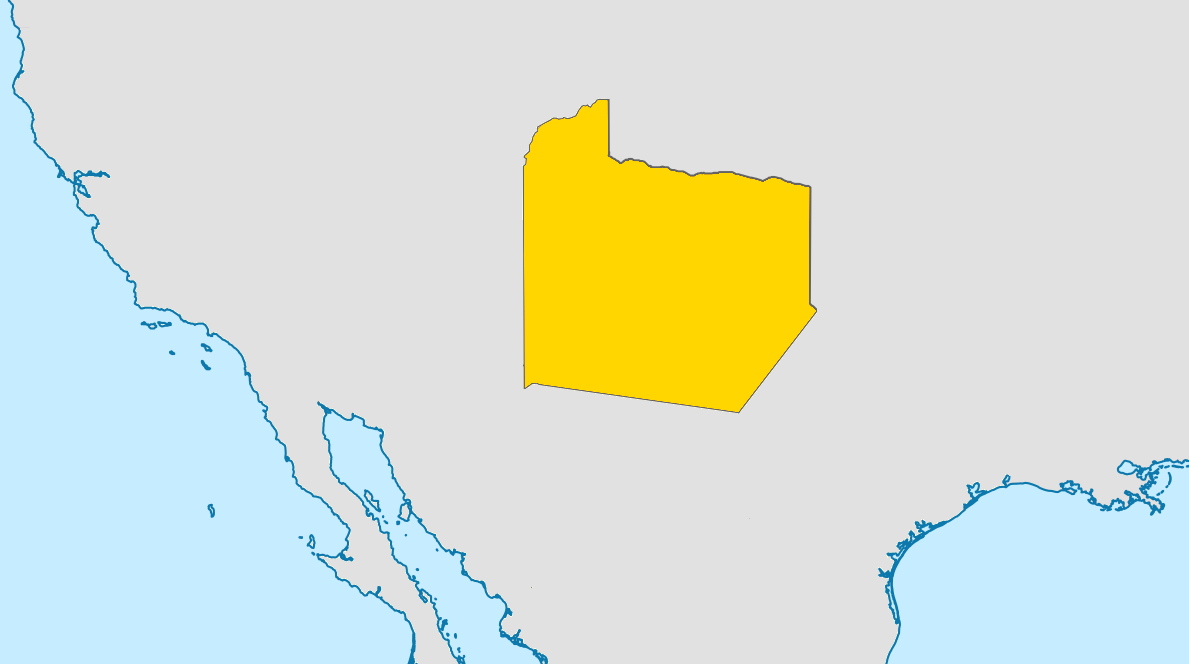
During the time of the Pueblo confederation, the Spanish and their Pueblo allies were exiled to El Paso del Norte, in today's Ciudad Juárez.

Some pueblos were friendly to the foreigners, but after cultural differences and the banishment of local religions, tensions against the Spanish rose significantly. After compounding misdeeds and overbearing taxes by the Spanish invaders, the indigenous communities rebelled in what is now referred to as the Pueblo Revolt of 1680. This rebellion saw the Spanish expelled from Nuevo México for a period of 12 years, and the Pueblo peoples were able to regain lost lands.

==== Reestablishment ====
In 1692, the Spanish returned to New Mexico after being invited by some Pueblo elders. Diego de Vargas achieved the reoccupation of Santa Fe. The province came under the jurisdiction of the Real Audiencia de Guadalajara, with oversight by the Viceroy of New Spain at Mexico City.

==== 18th century ====
In 1777, with the creation of the Commandancy General of the Provincias Internas, the Nuevo México Province was removed from the oversight of the Viceroy and placed solely in the jurisdiction of the new commandant general. This caused much unrest, due to the sudden lack of representation in Santa Fe for the region of Nuevo México.

=== Mexican territory ===
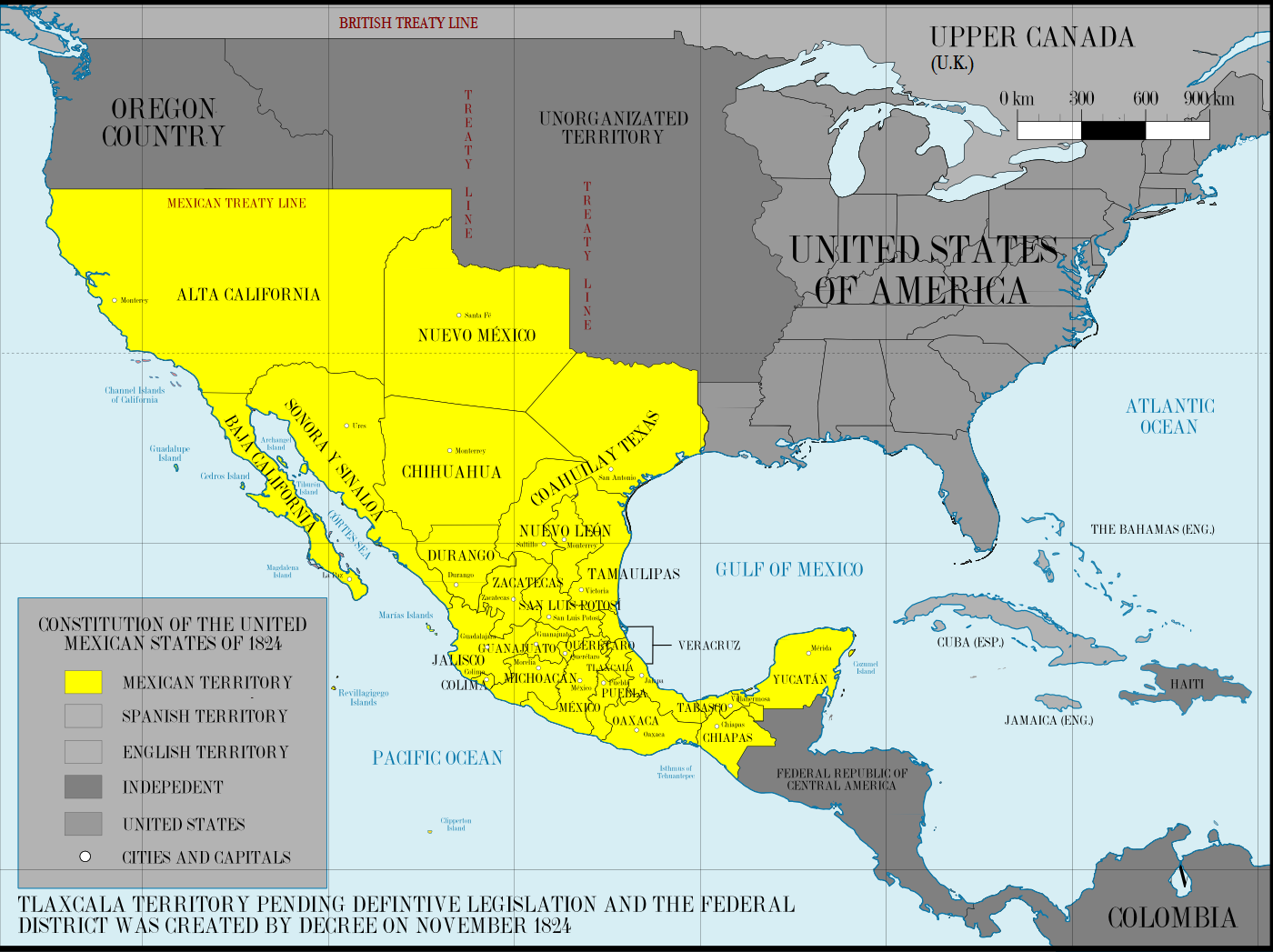
Map of Mexico in 1824 showing the province of Nuevo México

The province remained in Spanish control until Mexico's declaration of independence in 1821.

The Old Spanish Trail was expanded in 1829, merchant Antonio Armijo expanded the traderoutes of Nuevo México to reach the Mormon Road and The Californias out west. Their original campsite is now located about 300 feet below the surface of Lake Mead. Armijo's scout Raphael Rivera found Las Vegas Springs, at what is today Las Vegas, Nevada, and it became the furthest western outpost for Nuevo México. The governor of New Mexico, José Antonio Chaves, published the report on June 19, 1830.

==== Río Arriba Rebellion ====
The Mestizo and Pueblo populations of Santa Fe de Nuevo México rebelled against the Centralist Republic in the 1837 Río Arriba Rebellion. Rebel governor José María González he floated a plan to invite foreigners to join the rebellion and annex New Mexico to the United States in return for support of the rebellion. This proposal weakened his support internally. Pablo Montoya overthrew González and betrayed him to the Centralists in return for amnesty for his faction.

==== Texian invasion ====
The part of the former province east of the Rio Grande was claimed by the Republic of Texas, which won its independence in 1836. This claim was disputed by Mexico. In 1841, the Texans sent the Texan Santa Fe Expedition, ostensibly for trade but with hopes of occupying the claimed area, but the expedition was captured by New Mexican troops under New Mexico governor Manuel Armijo.

=== American territory ===
The United States inherited the unenforced claim to the east bank with the Texas Annexation in 1845. The U.S. Army under Stephen Kearny occupied the territory in 1846 during the Mexican–American War, a provisional government was established, and Mexico recognized its loss to the United States in 1848 with the Mexican Cession in the Treaty of Guadalupe Hidalgo.

Texas continued to claim the eastern part of the region. However, as part of the Compromise of 1850, Texas accepted $10 million in exchange for relinquishing its claims to areas within and north of the present boundaries of New Mexico and the Texas Panhandle. The compromise also granted Texas control of El Paso, while recognizing the establishment of the New Mexico Territory, based in part on trade routes such as Camino Real de Tierra Adentro, Santa Fe Trail, and Old Spanish Trail through the Las Vegas Valley and into what is now Arizona and New Mexico itself. In 1855, the Old Mormon Fort was established in the Las Vegas Valley, in what is now Clark County, Nevada. These developments also contributed to New Mexico securing water rights to the Rio Grande and Colorado River, allowing the territory and its subsequent states to fill their reservoir lakes.

Presidents Zachary Taylor and Abraham Lincoln both proposed that New Mexico immediately become a state to sidestep political conflict over slavery in the territories. The already established rule of law which had passed from New Spain and Mexico within New Mexico already outlawed slavery, as was the legal precedent with genízaros.

New Mexico became an official U.S. state in 1912.

== See also ==
- Ancient Pueblo peoples
- Apache people
- Cuisine of the Southwestern United States
- History of New Mexico
- Hispanos (Californios, Genízaros, and Tejanos)
- Hispanos of New Mexico
- Navajo people
- New Mexican cuisine
- New Mexican Spanish
- New Mexico Territory
- New Mexico
- New Mexico music
- Pueblo
- Puebloan people
- Pueblo music
- Pueblo Revolt
- Spanish governors of New Mexico
- Spanish missions in New Mexico
- Supply of Franciscan missions in New Mexico
