= Texas raids on New Mexico (1843) =

Texan raids on New Mexico (1843)
Date	13th May 1843 – 30 June 1843
Location	New Mexico
Result	Mexican victory: Mexico retains control over New Mexico; Withdrawal of Texan forces

Belligerents
Mexico	Texas

Commanders and leaders
Unknown	Charles A. Warfield; Jacob Snively; McDaniel

Strength
Unknown	187

Casualties and losses
27 killed	Unknown

The Republic of Texas. The present-day outlines of the U.S. states are superimposed on the boundaries of 1836–1845.

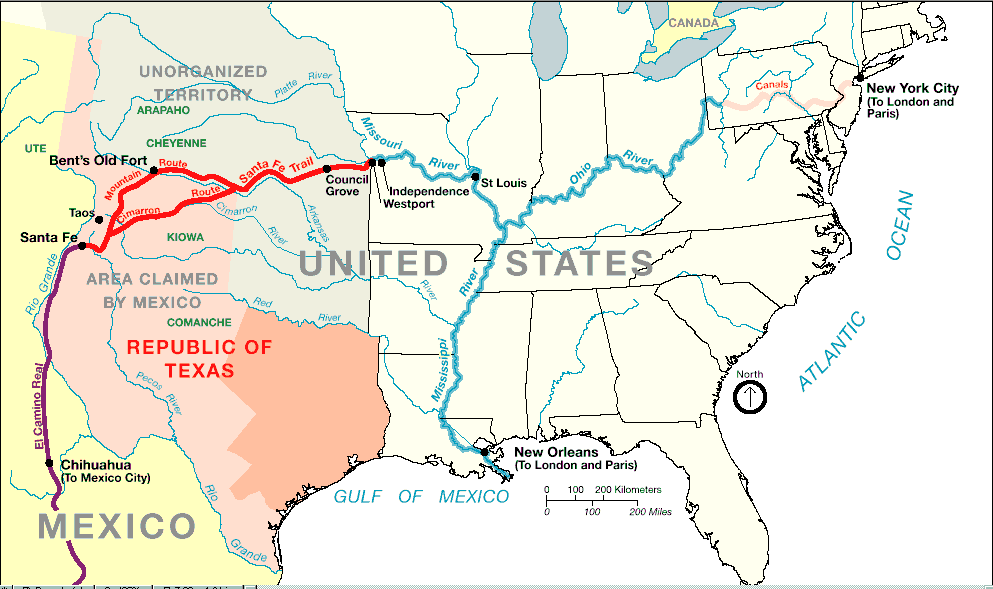
Map of the Santa Fe Trail (in red) in 1845. A detailed present-day map is also available.

Texas raids on New Mexico in 1843 consisted of two expeditions sanctioned by the still independent country of Texas to raid Mexican commerce on the Santa Fe Trail and to assert control for Texas of New Mexico east of the Rio Grande, long inhabited by Hispanic settlers and Pueblo Indians.

Both expeditions failed to do more than create apprehension by both the United States and Mexico that trade would be interrupted on the Santa Fe Trail. The Texans killed several Mexican traders along the trail and several civilians in a raid near the town of Mora, New Mexico. The Texans also killed or briefly took captive several Mexican soldiers.

== Background ==
In 1836, Texas gained its independence from Mexico. The boundaries of the new country were uncertain, with Texas claiming a southern and western boundary of the Rio Grande, a claim that encompassed most of the populated parts of the Mexican province of New Mexico. New Mexico had been first settled by the Spanish in 1598 and in 1840 had an Hispanic and Pueblo Indian population of more than 40,000, including a few hundred Anglos. In an attempt to assert Texan ownership of New Mexico and to capture the trade flowing to New Mexico along the Santa Fe Trail, Texas president Mirabeau Lamar launched an ill-fated expedition in 1841. Three hundred and twenty Texans, including 50 merchants, set out on the expedition. The expedition failed and 172 men, "weak, starved, and scurvy-ridden," surrendered to New Mexico Governor Manuel Armijo. The Texans were marched 2,000 miles south to prison in Veracruz, although released to return to Texas in 1842.

The humiliation caused by the defeat of the 1841 expedition and the opinion that the Texans captured were treated unjustly led to a desire in 1843 for revenge, plus a renewed effort by Texas to capture eastern New Mexico and to plunder Mexican trade.

== Warfield and McDaniel ==
On August 16, 1842, Charles A. Warfield, a merchant, was authorized by the Texas Secretary of War George Washington Hockley to invade New Mexico. Warfield estimated he would need a force of 800 to 1,000 men for the task. He began recruiting in Texas, Arkansas, and Missouri. He planned to unite his forces at Point of Rocks in Mexican-claimed territory on the Cimarron Cutoff of the Santa Fe Trail near present-day Liberal, Kansas.

Warfield claimed the right to rob Mexican citizens he encountered on the Santa Fe Trail. American traders who plied the Santa Fe Trail were concerned that Warfield's "Banditii" and "men of desperate character" would interrupt trade on the trail and requested a military escort for their wagon trains headed toward New Mexico. Colonel Stephen W. Kearney of the U.S. army granted the request, although he was ordered not to cross into Mexican territory on the south side of the Arkansas River. The north side of the Arkansas River was territory belonging to the U.S. and Plains Indians. Kearney also instructed men and posts under his command to prevent suspicious people from entering Indian country. One of Warfield's officers, John McDaniel, with a gang of about 13 men murdered a Mexican trader, Antonio Jose Chavez, and five of his employees along the Santa Fe trail near present-day Lyons, Kansas in early April 1843. McDaniel and his men were captured by the U.S. McDaniel was hanged and others received prison sentences.

Warfield's attempts to recruit an army failed and with only 24 men he ventured into New Mexico. On May 13, he attacked a group of New Mexicans near Mora, New Mexico. Warfield killed three men and captured about 70 horses. However, a camp of New Mexican ciboleros (bison hunters) responded and on June 14 near Wagon Mound attacked Warfield and recaptured their horses and left him on foot. Warfield and his men had to walk 200 miles (320 km) to Bent's Fort in Colorado, the nearest place where he could receive help.

== Snively ==
While Warfield was attempting to organize an invasion of New Mexico, another Texan, Jacob ("old Jake") Snively, an officer in the army of Texas, was also attempting to raise a military force to attack New Mexican traders. He petitioned the Texas government for permission to organize "an expedition for the purpose of intercepting and capturing the property of Mexican traders who might pass through territory claimed by Texas on the Santa Fe Trail." On 16 February 1843, the Texas Department of War approved his petition and authorized him to raise a force of not more than 300 men. The proceeds from his raids on Mexican traders were to be divided equally between Snively and his men and the Republic of Texas.

On April 24, 1843, Snively and 150 men (called the "Battalion of Invincibles") marched north from present day Grayson County, Texas, arriving in present-day Edwards County, Kansas on May 27. Warfield and several of his group joined Snively in Kansas. On June 20, the Snively group attacked a Mexican military unit, killing 17 and taking 82 prisoners with no losses of their own. Soon, however, Snively's command broke down as a result of dissention. The Mexican prisoners were released and a group of 76 called the "home boys" left Snively and marched eastward toward Arkansas. On June 30, Snively and his remaining force were discovered by Capt. Philip St. George Cooke and a U.S. army force of 185 men. Cooke informed Snively he was on U.S. territory, forced him to surrender, and escorted about 50 disenchanted men of Snively's command to Missouri. Cook confiscated most of Snively's weapons. With about 70 men left, Snively and Warfield contemplated attacking a Mexican trade caravan, but decided they had not the capability to do so and returned to Texas, disbanding on August 6.

== Aftermath ==
Texas joined the United States as a state in 1845, an event which precipitated the Mexican-American War of 1846–1848. New Mexico was captured by U.S. forces and became part of the United States. Warfield disappeared from history soon after 1843; Snively died in 1871. However, Texas did seize more of New Mexico. In January of 1850, while Congress was debating the border between Texas and New Mexico, Texan Governor Bell selected Robert S. Neighbors to go incorporate Texan claims on New Mexico east of the Rio Grande, from El Paso to Santa Fe counties. Neighbors arrived in El Paso county, 500 miles from the nearest Texas city, and by late February announcing Texas jurisdiction and setting up local county institutions under the jurisdiction of Texas. While he claimed to have encountered "no opposition," this claim is suspect as there is no indication of anything being translated in the Spanish language of the region and other reports cite “the Mexican man has a great antipathy for the Texians,” and Governor Bell admitted "All their associations and ties are with their own countrymen in Santa Fe and New Mexico." Further suspicion as to how open this process is raised by the quickness, the fact that Anglos were elected to every county position, despite the incredibly small Anglo population, and the lack of even a Texas constitution. Despite his initial instructions to continue on up through Santa Fe County, he returned to Texas having only organized El Paso County. As Congress was negotiating the Compromise of 1850 on questions, the border between New Mexico and Texas became part of that compromise with Texas a slave-state and New Mexico not. As part of the compromise, With Neighbors' paper-thin organization of El Paso County, El Paso went to Texas, though Doña Ana was broken off the county and went to New Mexico.
