= Thomas Falconer (jurist) =

English jurist and explorer

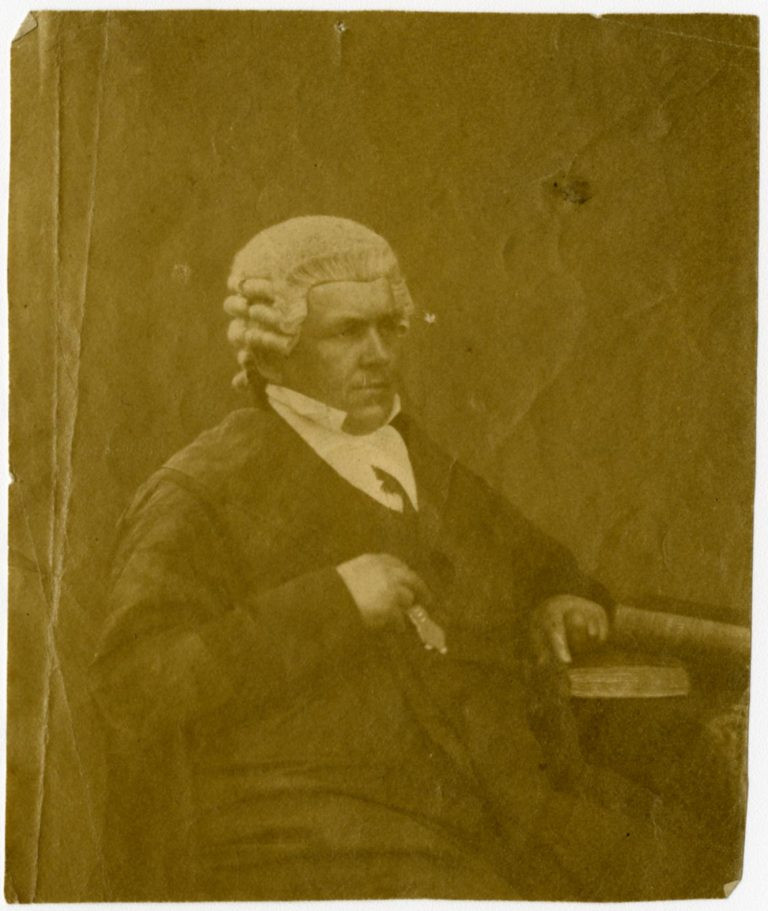
Thomas Falconer in judge's rob and peruke, 1854

Thomas Falconer FRGS, FGS (25 June 1805 – 28 August 1882) was an English jurist and explorer.

Born in Bath, England on 25 June 1805, Falconer was admitted to Lincoln's Inn in 1823, and to the bar in 1830. He practised for a number of years as an equity draftsman and conveyancer, and later turned to codifying the laws and statutes of England.

In 1840, Falconer emigrated to the Republic of Texas, sailing from England on the Britannia on 20 October, and arriving in May 1841. On his arrival he obtained permission to accompany the Texan Santa Fe Expedition as an observer. The expedition left Austin on 18 June. On the trail towards New Mexico, Falconer had his horse stolen by Kiowa Indians. On 31 August, the expedition leader, Hugh McLeod, decided to split the party, with some to proceed to San Miguel and return with provision, while the rest remained in camp. As Falconer had no horse, he remained in camp. Falconer's party was attacked by Indians a number of times, and nearly starved to death before the other party returned on 9 October as prisoners of the Mexicans. Falconer's party was also taken prisoner, and marched to Mexico City, arriving on 3 February 1842. He was then immediately released at the demand of the British minister Richard Pakenham.

Later that year, Falconer published his account of the expedition as Expedition to Santa Fé: An Account of Its Journey from Texas through Mexico, with Particulars of Its Capture. In 1844 he also published Notes of a Journey through Texas and New Mexico, in the years 1841 and 1842 in the Journal of the Royal Geographical Society of London. After returning to England, he published another major work on his travels, The Oregon Question; or a Statement of the British Claims to the Oregon Territory in Opposition to the Pretension of the Government of the United States of America.

In 1848, Falconer was offered, but declined, an appointment as private secretary to Henry Barkly, governor of British Guiana. Late in 1850 he was appointed an arbitrator to decide the boundary between New Brunswick and Canada. In March 1851, he was nominated to the position of Colonial Secretary of Western Australia, but refused appointment. Despite declining the appointment, and therefore never arriving in Western Australia, he is officially considered to have held the position until the next appointment to the position in January 1852.

On 22 December 1851, Falconer accepted appointment as judge of Glamorganshire, Brecknockshire and Rhayader. He sat on the bench for thirty years, retiring to the Royal Crescent in Bath in December 1881. He died at Bath on 28 August 1882, the result of a fall he had suffered the previous June while visiting the Bath Rose Show. He was member of the Royal Geographical Society and the Geological Society of London.

== Arms ==
Coat of arms of Thomas Falconer

Crest
A falcon hooded and belled Proper.
Escutcheon
Or a hawk's head issuing out of a human heart Proper between three mullets Azure on a bordure of the last eight plates.
Motto
Vive Ut Vivas
