= Pablo Montoya =

New Mexican politician (1816–1847)

2nd Governor of the Cantón de Nuevo México 12th and 15th Mexican Governor of Nuevo México
- In office Early September – 21 September 1837; 19 January, 1847 - 7 February 1847
- Preceded by: José María González (Cantón de Nuevo México); Juan Bautista Vigil y Alarid (Santa Fe de Nuevo México)
- Succeeded by: Manuel Armijo (Santa Fe de Nuevo México); Donaciano Vigil (United States)

Alcalde of Taos
- In office 1800s–7 February 1847

Personal details
- Born: July 1, 1792 Abiquiú, Santa Fe de Nuevo México, New Spain
- Died: February 7, 1847 (aged 54) Taos, New Mexico Territory
- Spouse: Maria Teresa Esquivel

Jose Pablo Montoya (July 1, 1792– February 7, 1847) was a New Mexican politician who was Governor of Nuevo México during the Junta Popular of the Río Arriba Rebellion of 1837 against the Centralist Republic of Mexico and the Taos Revolt of 1847 against the United States during the Mexican–American War.

Pablo Montoya was the fourth Pueblo leader of New Mexico after Po'pay and Luis Tupatu of the Pueblo republic (1680-1692), and his predecessor José María González. He was also the final Mexican Governor of the territory.

== Early life ==
Jose Pablo Montoya was born July 1, 1792, the son of Andres Montoya and Victoria Velarde.

== Career ==
At some point Montoya was the mayor of Taos. In 1837 he was part of the New Mexican Río Arriba Rebellion which briefly made first José María González and then Montoya governor of New Mexico. Both González, a Taos Pueblo Indian, and Montoya, a Hispano of Spanish descent, led the Junta Popular, the most ethnically inclusive government in the history of New Mexico. In September of that year he led an army of 3000 rebels to within a league and a half of Santa Fe, where he arranged a truce with Gen. Manuel Armijo. He secured his personal immunity by turning over the planners of the rebellion, who were jailed in Santa Fe and later executed by Armijo's forces. Montoya was allowed to return to his home.

In January 1847 Montoya participated in the insurrection against United States rule in New Mexico, begun by those who did not accept the Mexican governor's surrender. Historian David Lavender said that Montoya "style[d] himself as the Santa Anna of the North."

Montoya was captured during the 1847 revolt. After the U.S. had re-established control, a military court charged him with and convicted him of treason. The judges sentenced him and 14 other men to death for their roles in the revolt. Montoya and the others were hanged in the Taos Plaza on February 7, 1847.

== Personal life ==
He married Maria Teresa Esquivel and they had established a family in present-day Taos, New Mexico. He was likely a landowner and rancher.

== Cultural references ==
- Pablo Montoya is featured as one of the protagonists in Maxwell Anderson's 1932 play Night Over Taos.
