= Juan Bautista Vigil y Alarid =

American politician (1792–1866)

Mexican Governor of New Mexico (Interim)
- In office August 1846 – September 1846
- Preceded by: Manuel Armijo
- Succeeded by: Charles Bent (United States); Pablo Montoya (Mexico)

Personal details
- Born: 1792 Santa Fe, Nuevo México, Viceroyalty of New Spain (now New Mexico, U.S.)
- Died: 1866 (aged 73–74)
- Profession: Politician

Juan Bautista Vigil y Alarid (1792–1866) was acting Governor of New Mexico in 1846 during the period when the United States consolidated military rule over the former territory of Mexico following the Mexican–American War. Alarid surrendered to the Americans and became the penultimate Mexican governor of New Mexico, and the final governor to rule from Santa Fe.

== Early career ==
Juan Bautista Vigil y Alarid was born in Santa Fe, New Mexico in 1792, son of Domingo Vigil and María Francisca Alarid, both from military families. In 1808 he married Rafaela Sánchez in Tomé, New Mexico. After the independence of Mexico from Spain in 1821, he became secretary of state to the first Mexican governor of New Mexico, Francisco Javier Chávez. He was to serve in various positions in the New Mexican government until the United States take-over.

New Mexico was at first a province of the Estado interno del Norte, with capital in Chihuahua. In May 1824 Vigil was New Mexican deputy to the state congress in Chihuahua. As of 6 July 1824, New Mexico was made a separate territory, with El Paso del Norte (now called Ciudad Juárez) transferred from New Mexico to the State of Chihuahua, a move that Vigil opposed. In 1826 Vigil was appointed customs collector by the central government, in charge of regulating the trade with the United States via the Santa Fe Trail, a difficult position and one in which he came to blows with the trader Charles Bent.

== Acting governor ==
Vigil y Alarid was left in charge as acting Governor of New Mexico when his predecessor Manuel Armijo fled Santa Fe to escape the approaching U.S. troops under General Stephen W. Kearny. On 19 August 1846 he accepted the defeat of New Mexico and pledged the loyalty of himself and his fellow citizens to the United States. In his speech he said, presumably reflecting the views of other leading citizens:

General: The address which you have just delivered, in which you announce that you have taken possession of this great country in the name of the United States of America, gives us some idea of the wonderful future that awaits us. It is not for us to determine. the boundaries of nations ... it is for us to obey and respect the established authorities, no matter what may be our private opinions ... No one in this world can successfully resist the power of Him who is stronger. Do not find it strange if there has been no manifestation of joy and enthusiasm in seeing this country occupied by your military forces ... Today we belong to a great and powerful nation ... In the name, then, of the entire department, I swear obedience to the northern republic and I tender my respect to its laws and authority.

In September 1846 Kearny appointed Charles Bent as Vigil y Alarid's successor.

== Later career ==
Vigil y Alarid moved south to Aldama, just north of Chihuahua city, some time before 1851. He was elected to the local council of Guadelupe on 10 February 1852. The head of the council was Father Ramón Ortiz, who was also the commissioner of repatriation for emigrants from New Mexico. He participated with Ortiz in organizing the festivities for Mexican Independence Day on 16 September 1852. However, Vigil testified against Ortiz during an investigation of his activities as emigrant commissioner the next year, that led to dismissal of Ortiz. After 1846, Alarid y Vigil fought for the rights of Mexicans by using the Treaty of Guadalupe Hidalgo to their advantage, until he considered that, in fact, his Mexican homeland "had died." After losing a political office in New Mexico, he ended up allying with Mexico again and defended the old loyalties.

Little is known about Vigil's later life until his death in 1866.
