= Albino Pérez =

1830s Mexican politician

10th Mexican Governor of New Mexico
- In office July 1835 – August 1837
- Preceded by: Francisco Sarracino
- Succeeded by: José María González (Cantón de Nuevo México)

Personal details
- Died: 8 August 1837 Santa Fe
- Profession: Soldier, politician

Albino Pérez (died 8 August 1837) was a Mexican soldier and politician who was appointed Governor of New Mexico by President Antonio López de Santa Anna's Centralist Republic. He pursued unpopular policies, suffered a revolt in July 1837 and, in August 1837, was killed by rebel sympathizers.

== Career ==
Albino Pérez was a native of Veracruz, Mexico.

Pérez was a distinguished army colonel from central Mexico. He was appointed Governor of New Mexico by President Antonio López de Santa Anna in 1835, under the new centralized form of government. He succeeded Francisco Sarracino as civilian governor and Captain Blas de Hinojos as military governor. Hinojos had been killed on 28 February 1835 in an ambush while on a slave raid into Navajo country.

Pérez rapidly became unpopular as a representative of the centralist government who was expected to enforce its Departmental Plan and taxation program. On 16 October 1835, he announced new regulations of trade along the Santa Fe–Chihuahua Trail. He linked increases in attacks by well-armed Comanche, Apache, Ute, and Navajo raiders to illegal trade in guns with these Indians, and the regulations stopped this trade as well as stopping beaver trapping without license. The law was unpopular.

It did not help that he had an autocratic manner and was not a native of the province. Pérez dissolved the municipal council of Santa Cruz de la Cañada in December 1836, and in July 1837 arrested the alcalde (mayor) of Santa Cruz, Juan José Esquibel. A mob quickly freed Esquibel, who formed a new council opposed to the central government.

Pérez managed, with difficulty, to assemble 200 volunteers to put down the rebellion in Santa Cruz, and marched north on 7 August 1837. He met a force of 1,500 or more armed rebels at La Mesilla (Black Mesa) near San Ildefonso Pueblo. Most of Pérez's force deserted him, and he began to retreat with a small group of supporters. They were caught on the outskirts of Santa Fe by some Indians from Santo Domingo Pueblo, who decapitated Pérez and killed some of his supporters, then proceeded to play football with his head. The rebels proclaimed José González of Taos, one of their leaders, as governor of New Mexico. The former governor Manuel Armijo gathered troops, and in January 1838 retook control and had González executed.

== Memorial ==
The Daughters of the American Revolution originally erected the simple stone marker, engraved with the date of Pérez's assassination, near the corner of Hickox and Agua Fría streets in Santa Fe, in 1901. But by 1970, the stone had become so worn that it was moved to the Palace of the Governors for safekeeping. For years, it has sat beneath one of the giant cottonwoods in the palace's courtyard. In June 2007 a monument commemorating Pérez was deeded to the Palace of the Governors in Santa Fe.
