= Maria Gertrudis Barceló =

American gambler

Maria Gertrudis "Tules" Barceló (c. 1800 – January 17, 1852), commonly known as "La Tules," was a saloon owner and master gambler in the Territory of New Mexico at the time of the U.S.-Mexican War. Barceló amassed a small fortune by capitalizing on the flow of American and Mexican traders involved with the nineteenth-century Santa Fe Trail. She became infamous in the U.S. as the Mexican "Queen of Sin" through a series of American travel writings and newspaper serials before, during, and after the war. These depictions, often intended to explain or justify the U.S. invasion of Mexico, presented La Tules as a madame and prostitute who symbolized the supposedly immoral nature of the local Mexican population.

== Early life ==
Barceló may have been born in the state of Sonora, Mexico around 1800 but one correspondent of the time, Wilkins Kendall of the New Orleans Picayune, argued in his book Narrative of the Texas—Santa Fe Expedition that she was French, referring to her as Madame Toulouse. Not much is known about her early life or her family. Shortly after Mexico won its independence from Spain in 1821, Barceló, her parents, a brother, and two sisters moved to the remote northern territory of New Mexico.

On June 23, 1823, Barceló married Manuel Sisneros at the Church of Tome. The priest who performed the ceremony referred to her as "Doña," a title given to women of quality and high social standing. Much attention would later be given to the fact that she was four years older than her groom and four or five months pregnant at the time. The couple had two sons, both of whom died as infants. Fiercely independent, Barceló retained all of her own property throughout her marriage and was known by her maiden name.

== Early gambling career ==
In 1825, Mexican authorities fined Barceló for operating a gambling salon for miners in the Ortiz Mountains. Sometime over the next ten years, Barceló relocated to Santa Fe and opened a more ambitious saloon at the center of Santa Fe, New Mexico. She went by the nickname "Tules," a Spanish diminutive of "Gertrudis." Some authors have connected this to the Mexican Spanish word tules, meaning "reeds," with suggestions that it referred to "the curvaceousness of her figure" or possibly to "her thin frame."

== Contact with Anglo-Americans ==
Because of its centrality in Santa Fe, Barceló's saloon entertained many Americans traveling the Santa Fe Trail. Susan Magoffin, grand-daughter of Kentucky's first governor and the bride of an American trader, was perhaps Barceló's greatest critic. She wrote the La Tules "made her living by running a house where open gambling, drinking, and smoking were enjoyed by all...with no thought of being socially degraded." Some drank her liquor and gambled at her tables, but later reviled "Doña Tules" in writings sent to the Eastern U.S. Typical of many, Josiah Gregg's widely read Commerce of the Prairies described Tules as a woman of "loose habits."." In addition to erroneous assertions that she was a prostitute, many also claimed that she was having an illicit affair with Manuel Armijo, the Governor of New Mexico.

These sensational accounts were often embellished, if not totally fabricated. Most of the American descriptions of Tules Barceló contradicted each other. Some claimed she was astoundingly beautiful, while others wrote of her as old and toothless. Some said she had coal-black hair, while others said she had a shock of red hair. Some mistakenly claimed that she had been born in Taos, New Mexico, rather than Sonora. The only real agreement among them was that Tules excelled at the card game monte, often winning vast piles of gold from the male customers in her saloon.

Barceló probably did not know about her infamy in English-language publications. She carefully guarded her good name in Santa Fe. On two occasions in the 1830s, Barceló went to court to defend herself against slanderous comments from her Mexican neighbors.

Despite her negative reputation among Americans and the alleged source of her "ill-gotten" fortune, the U.S. Army borrowed funds from Barceló shortly after the invasion of New Mexico in 1846. This loan paid the invading troops, making the continued occupation of Santa Fe possible. She's also been credited with exposing a conspiracy against the Army and thereby preventing a massacre.

Under the terms of the Treaty of Guadalupe Hidalgo, Barceló, like the other Mexican citizens in the territory, automatically became a U.S. citizen in 1849 by simply having waited a year after the treaty's signing.

== Death ==
Barceló died on January 17, 1852, in Santa Fe with a remarkable fortune of $10,000 and several houses. Her will and a deed dictated to a local magistrate are the only documents known to have been written by her. She left her residence and property to her brother, her sister, and two young girls who had lived with her. All of Santa Fe attended her elaborate funeral, which was criticized by some for being too fancy for a woman like her, and for being financed by "ill-gotten gain."

== Legacy ==
Novelists, historians, and even performers have been drawn to Barceló's legend. Far from being historically accurate, most of the representations of her since 1852 have been influenced by ahistorical or racist assumptions. Anna Burr presented Tules as a manipulative trickster in the 1936 novel, The Golden Quicksand.

In 1948, Ruth Laughlin wrote the novel The Wind Leaves No Shadow with Barceló as the protagonist. While Laughlin clearly intended to be sympathetic to Barceló, racist assumptions nonetheless guided the novel's content. Except Barceló, the Mexicans in Laughlin's novel conform to stereotypes as jealous, superstitious, lustful, or even as outright murderers.

The actress Katy Jurado appeared as Dona Tules in the 1962 episode "La Tules" of the syndicated television anthology series, Death Valley Days, hosted by Stanley Andrews.

The life of Dona Tules has also been told in the musical Viva Santa Fe!, written by James Stewart, The musical was first presented in Hobbs, New Mexico in 1991, then represented the state of New Mexico at the 1992 World's Fair in Seville, Spain. The musical was the featured entertainment at the Music Teacher's National Convention, in Albuquerque in 1995. The concert performance begins Fall of 2019 in Las Vegas, New Mexico. Starring VanAnn Moore and Andre Garcia Nuthman.

Doña Tules: Santa Fe's Courtesan and Gambler, written by Mary J. Straw Cook, was published in 2007 by the University of New Mexico Press. It is the most recent and best source available on La Tules. She researched this book at the archives in New Mexico for many years.

== Bibliography ==
- Chavez, Fray Angélico."Doña Tulas: Her Fame and Her Funeral," El Palacio, Vol. 57 #8 Aug, 1950.
- Magoffin, Susan Shelby. Down the Santa Fe Trail and into Mexico: The Diary of Susan Shelby Magoffin, 1846-1847. New Haven: Yale University Press, 1962.
- Dominguez, Orae. "María Gertrudis Barceló: "Doña Tules," New Mexico Office of the State Historian, undated, http://newmexicohistory.org/people/maria-gertrudis-barcelo-dona-tules. Accessed 27 Oct 2016. The article was published 10/24/2013 by the NMOSH.
