= Manuel Armijo =

Politician and governor of New Mexico (c.1793-1853)

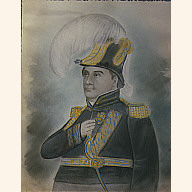
- Pastel portrait of Manuel Armijo by Alfred S. Waugh, c. 1840

6th, 13th, and 15th Mexican Governor of New Mexico
- In office 1827–1829
- Preceded by: Antonio Narbona
- Succeeded by: José Antonio Chaves
- In office 21 September 1837 – April 1844
- Preceded by: Pablo Montoya (Cantón de Nuevo México)
- Succeeded by: Mariano Chávez
- In office March 1845 – August 1846
- Preceded by: José Chávez y Castillo
- Succeeded by: Juan Bautista Vigil y Alarid

Personal details
- Born: c. 1793 Albuquerque, Nuevo México, New Spain
- Died: December 9, 1853 (aged 59–60) Lemitar, New Mexico Territory, United States
- Occupation: Military officer; politician

Military service
- Allegiance: Mexico
- Branch/service: Mexican Army
- Rank: Colonel
- Battles/wars: Río Arriba Rebellion; Mexico–Texas Conflicts; Texan Santa Fe Expedition; Texas raids on New Mexico; Mexican–American War; Capture of Santa Fe

Manuel Armijo (c. 1793 – December 9, 1853) was a Mexican soldier and statesman who served three times as governor of New Mexico between 1827 and 1846. He was instrumental in putting down the Revolt of 1837; he led the military forces that captured the invaders of the Texan Santa Fe Expedition; and he later surrendered to the United States in the Mexican–American War, leading to the capture of Santa Fe and occupation of New Mexico by the American army. Armijo attempted to expand Hispanic settlements and bolster the security of New Mexico by granting large acreages of land to prominent individuals. Armijo has been vilified by Americans participating in the conquest of New Mexico and some subsequent historians.

== Early life and first governorship ==
Manuel Armijo was born around 1793 in the Albuquerque, New Mexico area, most likely in Belen. He was the son of Vicente Ferrer Durán y Armijo and Bárbara Casilda Durán y Chávez, both from prominent New Mexico families. Vicente Armijo and his family resided in the Plaza de San Antonio de Belén during the 1790s, and according to the Spanish census, Vicente was a stockman and lieutenant in the militia. Manuel Armijo married María Trinidad Gabaldón in 1819. The couple did not have children but adopted a daughter named Ramona, who was named "my universal heir and daughter" in Manuel's will. Ramona Armijo was married to Luís C. de Baca of Socorro, New Mexico.

According to George Wilkins Kendall, Armijo became wealthy by working for a sheep rancher and stealing and selling the sheep, often to his own employer; but Kendall was writing about his experience as Armijo's prisoner in 1841 and his biographical sketch of Armijo is scurrilous. The historian Marc Simmons ascribes the story of sheep theft to "tradition". William Wroth wrote on the New Mexico State Historian's Website, "Governor Armijo was portrayed by George Wilkins Kendall as having been an uneducated man from a poor family who worked his way up by stealing. This gross caricature was Kendall's way of vilifying Armijo due to his perception that the Governor had treated him unfairly in 1841 in the capture of the disastrous Texas Santa Fe expedition." In general, according to many Hispanic New Mexicans, historians have been unfair in their telling of the history of Manuel Armijo. Angélico Chávez wrote, "Manuel Armijo's character as Governor and as a man has been unjustly painted in sources too numerous to mention here."

Armijo became the alcalde (mayor) of Albuquerque and militia lieutenant in 1822 and 1824. In 1827, he was appointed governor of New Mexico, but in 1828 he returned from Santa Fe to Albuquerque as a wealthy merchant in sheep and wool blankets, acting as alcalde again. Some have it that he left the governorship to avoid a Federal investigation.

In 1836 Armijo was appointed subcomisario, collector of customs, of New Mexico; this was a fund-raising position that involved work in Santa Fe. However, for health reasons he spent most of his time in Albuquerque and was replaced.

== Revolt of 1837 ==
In August 1837 disaffected residents of the northern part of New Mexico assassinated Governor Albino Pérez and took over the state (the Revolt of 1837). Many people in the southern part opposed the new government, but several prominent people refused to lead a counterrevolution. Mariano Chávez, a wealthy young relative of Armijo's, proposed him for the position and Armijo accepted. He marched to Santa Fe and declared himself governor, a position that the Mexican government also gave him when the news of the rebellion reached them (and not when Armijo's letter announcing his self-appointment reached them later, contrary to Kendall's account).

Armijo wrote to the government requesting federal troops, and trained soldiers under Lt. Col. Cayetano Justiniani of the Veracruz dragoons arrived in early January 1838. Later that month the rebellion flared up again and Armijo led the force that defeated the rebels at Pojoaque. According to Armijo's letters to the Mexican historian Carlos María de Bustamante, he was nominally in command but his forces were really led by Justiniani.

Beginning with Kendall, some American authors have accused Armijo of starting the rebellion that he later put down. The trader and writer Josiah Gregg said Armijo's brother "intimated" to Gregg that Armijo had ridden from Albuquerque to Santa Fe expecting the rebels to elect him governor. As he had taken no personal part in the insurrection, they "would not acknowledge his claim to their suffrages," so he returned to Albuquerque to plot the counterrevolution. The historian Janet Lecompte doubts this story and notes that there is no documentary evidence of any involvement of Armijo in the Revolt of 1837.

== Second term ==
In 1841 Armijo successfully repelled the Texan Santa Fe Expedition. The expedition, consisting of 270 soldiers and 50 traders, was launched toward New Mexico with the dual objectives of establishing commercial ties with New Mexico and asserting Texas' claims to own the eastern one-half of New Mexico. The expedition foundered and the Texans surrendered. Armijo's representatives apparently promised safe conduct of the Texan prisoners back to Texas, but instead Armijo took the merchants and soldiers into custody and sent them further south in Mexico as prisoners.

In 1843 the independent Republic of Texas launched two raids on New Mexico. One of the raids, commanded by Jacob Snively, had the objective of raiding New Mexican commerce along the Santa Fe Trail and reasserting claims that the eastern one-half of New Mexico belonged to Texas. Armijo and his force advanced onto the Great Plains in present-day Oklahoma and Kansas to meet the Texans. Snively, with more than 200 men, defeated a 100-man New Mexican scouting party. Armijo, who had 300 to 400 poorly-armed and trained men in his command, was told 1,200 Texans were advancing on his position. He retreated to Santa Fe. As Snively was in U.S. territory, the U.S. army intervened and partially disarmed his force. The expedition collapsed and Snively returned to Texas.

Stories about Armijo's corruption made it into Anglo accounts of the region to justify a U.S. invasion. Armijo was a friend, a business partner, and a rumored lover of the wealthy Santa Fe saloon owner Maria Gertrudis "Tules" Barceló.

=== Land grants ===
Land grants to individuals and groups by New Mexican governors had long been a characteristic of Spanish and Mexican rule. During the last years of Mexican rule, Armijo made several large individual grants to reward supporters and cronies, encourage settlement of the New Mexican frontier, bolster defenses against Indian raids, and counter growing U.S. encroachments, including the threat of invasion by the U.S. or Texas which was independent from 1836 to 1845.

Armijo approved grants of land totaling 9,700,000 acres (39,000 km^{2}) to New Mexican citizens (including several prominent Anglos who had become Mexican citizens) For example, in January 1841 Charles Beaubien and Guadalupe Miranda petitioned Armijo for a grant of 1,741,764 acres (7,048.67 km^{2}) of land east of the Sangre de Cristo range. Charles Bent became owner of part of that land, even though he was not a Mexican citizen. When Padre Martinez of Taos learned of the grant, he raised such a strong objection that Armijo withdrew the grant that summer. Armijo reinstated the grant after Beaubien died, giving it to his son-in-law, Lucien Maxwell. The grant is best known as the Maxwell Land Grant. The U.S., after taking control of New Mexico, adjudicated the grants and approved many of them as legal, but the ultimate owners of the land became in large part the Anglos and Hispanic politicians and speculators known as the Santa Fe Ring. Controversies concerning ownership of the land in the grants continued into the 21st century.

== Third term and Mexican–American War ==
Armijo was appointed to his third governorship in 1845. The following year, the Mexican–American War started and General Stephen Kearny brought about 1,700 soldiers to conquer New Mexico. Armijo heard of the plan in late June from an American business partner who arrived with a caravan on the Santa Fe Trail. Armijo sold his interest in their business to his partner and began liquidating his many other assets. Armijo also sent in a request to the Mexican government asking for regular troops to be sent for defense of New Mexico. The Mexican government officials promised to send these forces, yet they never arrived.

On August 4, as Kearny and his army crossed what is now the border between Colorado and New Mexico, Armijo signed a power of attorney so that an associate could take care of his affairs after he left. On August 8 he issued a proclamation to the people of New Mexico exhorting them to prepare to repel the invasion.

On about August 9 Armijo called a meeting with a number of respected New Mexicans. He did not want to fight, but the priests present did, as did the young regular-army commander, Diego Archuleta, and the young militia officers Manuel Chaves and Miguel Pino. According to a refugee from the war, Armijo would have done nothing toward defense if the latter two had not threatened to shoot him. Then on August 12 or 13 he received an American named James Magoffin, the husband of a relative of his, who later claimed to have convinced Armijo not to fight. An unverified story says that Magoffin bribed him. Magoffin later requested a reimbursement from the U.S. Treasury of $50,000, of which he received $30,000.

Another version of this story is that a spy of Governor Armijo was captured by Kearny, and given a tour of Kearny's forces in order for the spy to report to Armijo about the size and strength of the United States forces. Next Kearny sent Anglo-American trader, "James Magoffin, along with Captain Philip St. George Cooke and twelve dragoons to meet with the governor." Manuel Alvarez arranged a meeting with Armijo, his officials and Magoffin and St. George Cooke. According to Alvarez, despite knowing the size and strength of the United States forces, Governor Armijo was the only government official who wanted to defend New Mexico while the others were convinced that a disastrous defeat would be the outcome of any futile attempt at defense.

It wasn't until the governor called for the militia to meet at Apache Canyon to prepare for defense of New Mexico that he changed his mind. When he saw that his militia had weapons of spears, bows, arrows and outdated firearms, he knew they were outnumbered, under-trained and under-equipped to meet the regular United States' army. After inspecting his men, he sent them home. Armijo decided he should go to Mexico and plead for more help from the Mexican government. According to a previous New Mexico State Historian, Thomas E. Chávez, there is no evidence that Armijo ever took a bribe, yet to the contrary, there is evidence to prove that Armijo was one of the few who wanted to fight the invaders.

Around this same time some Santa Feans talked of killing the American traders in the town, but Armijo put a stop to the plan and dismissed Archuleta. In any case, at the Battle of Santa Fe, Armijo set up a position in Apache Canyon, a narrow pass about 10 miles (16 km) southeast of the city, but decided not to fight before the American army was even in sight. When Pino, Chaves and some of the militiamen insisted, Armijo ordered the cannon pointed at them. All of the New Mexican army retreated to Santa Fe and Armijo fled to Chihuahua, while Kearny and his force entered Santa Fe and claimed New Mexico for the U.S. without a shot fired.

Armijo was tried in Mexico City for cowardice and desertion in the face of the enemy, but he was acquitted. While in Mexico City, he interceded on behalf of Magoffin, who had been arrested as a spy in Chihuahua.

Armijo later returned to Lemitar, New Mexico, and lived the rest of his life there. He is buried in the churchyard (Camposanto Iglesia) in front of San Miguel de Socorro, in the northwest corner. One of his sons, Manuel Armijo, served as Colonel of the New Mexico Militia in the American Civil War, participating in the Battle of Valverde.
