= Francisco Sarracino =

American politician

9th Mexican Governor of New Mexico
- In office 1833 – 14 May 1835
- Preceded by: Santiago Abreú
- Succeeded by: Albino Pérez

Personal details
- Born: 21 February 1790
- Died: Unknown

Francisco Sarracino (21 February 1790 – unknown) was the géfe político or governor of New Mexico from 1833 to 1835.

== Early years ==
Francisco Antonio Jose Felix Sarracino was born of 21 February 1790 at Pajarito pueblo, son of Jose Rafael Sarracino and Maria Luisa Bartola Gutierrez. He was a descendant of Don Pedro Durán Y Cháves.

== Governor of New Mexico ==
Sarracino was appointed governor of New Mexico from 1833 to 1835. He was the first governor to use the printing press in New Mexico, in 1834. This was the same press that Father Martinez of Taos used to publish the Cuaderno de Ortografia. In 1834 Sarracino published a decree in which he took up the cause of the poor people who had to serve in the militia at their own expense, contributing their own horses, equipment and provisions for up to three months in the field. He said these pobres faced ruin "if we continue in this inaction which offers dishonorable testimony to our foolishness and indifference," saying that they fought "without enthusiasm or zeal", only because they were obliged to fight. During his tenure, in October 1834 Juan Rafael Ortiz acted as governor.

== Later career ==
Sarracino left office on 14 May 1835. Mariano Cháves was acting géfe político until the arrival of Albino Pérez in July 1835. Pérez appointed Sarracino to the office of sub-comisario, but he was forced out of this office in 1836, charged with embezzlement while governor. Alleged misdeed included levying illegal taxes on traders, accepting bribes from Spanish priests who were being threatened with expulsion because they had not become Mexican citizens, and misusing public funds.

On 22 October 1843 Francisco Sarracino, who represented the military party as opposed to the clerical party, was elected as alternative deputy to the Congress in Mexico City. The next day the members of the assembly for the newly formed Department of New Mexico were chosen. On 23 March 1844, as prefect of the Second District of the Department, Sarracino was one of the signatories to a peace treaty concluded with the Navajo in the Pueblo of Santo Domingo. The others were the governor Mariano Cháves and Commandante General of the department Mariano Martinez.

Following the occupation of New Mexico by United States troops in 1846, on 10 October 1848 Governor Donaciano Vigil arranged for a convention to be held at Santa Fe. Francisco Sarracino, Vigil, James Quinn and Juan Perea drafted a memorial to the United States Congress which asked for the immediate establishment of a civilian Territorial government. The petition opposed transfer of any of the New Mexico territory to Texas, and opposed the introduction of slavery.
