= Genízaro =

Ethnic group in the Southwest United States

Genízaros, or Genizaros, are detribalized people of Indigenous ancestry, primarily in New Mexico, who descended from enslaved Native Americans in the Southwestern United States, including some Great Basin and Southern Plains Indians.

Genízaros' ethnogenesis occurred from the 17th to 19th centuries in the Spanish colony of New Mexico and neighboring regions of the American Southwest. Genízaros were usually women and children who had been captured in war by the Spanish or purchased from Indian tribes who had held them captive as slaves. To circumvent Spanish laws forbidding slavery ie the New Laws of 1542 to 1543, the purchaser (or rescuer) of a genízaro had the obligation to introduce them to Christianity and Spanish customs. Genízaros worked as indentured servants, shepherds, and laborers. They occupied the lowest rung of status-conscious Spanish society in New Mexico but slowly assimilated and intermarried into Spanish and later Mexican (1821-1846) and American (1846-present day) society.

The descendants of genízaros are also called genízaros, and the word has become a term of pride for the descendants of the original Indian captives and slaves. In 1793, genízaros were estimated to have comprised up to one-third of the 29,041 people living under Spanish rule in New Mexico.

From 1543, New Spain implemented a ban on Indigenous slavery, except for those captured during wartime. The restrictions of slavery also meant that Genízaros were to be convicted and sentenced to servitude for a specific period, after which they earned freedom. They were even encouraged to become landowners through Spanish government land grants or join the regional militia. In 1810, there was a growing movement to abolish slavery during Mexican independence, and the practice of slavery began to lose favor in the Spanish Empire. The support for abolishing slavery increased after José María Morelos officially included it in the Sentimientos de la Nación of 1813. It became law after the Solemn Act of the Declaration of Independence of Northern America of the First Mexican Republic during the era of the centralist Republic. In 1837, Genízaros joined other citizen-soldiers of New Mexico during the Chimayó Rebellion to fight for New Mexico's secession from the centralist Republic of Mexico. The rebellion was led by José Gonzales, who was a Genízaro.

Genízaros settled in several New Mexican villages, such as Belén, Tomé, Valencia, Carnuel, Los Lentes, Las Trampas, Socorro, and San Miguel del Vado. Genízaros also lived in Albuquerque, Bernalillo, Atrisco, Santa Fe, Chimayó, Taos, Abiquiú, and Las Vegas, NM. Most Genízaros were, or their ancestors had been, slaves of Indian tribes, particularly the Plains tribes who raided and enslaved members of tribes allied with the Spaniards, such as the Apaches.

In 2007, genízaros and their contemporary descendants were recognized as Indigenous people by the New Mexico Legislature. During the early 21st century, they comprised much of the population of the South Valley of Albuquerque and significant portions of the population of northern New Mexico, including Española, Taos, Santa Fe, Las Vegas, and southern Colorado.

== Name ==
The term Genízaro is a Spanish word borrowed from the Italian word giannizzero, which was adopted from the Ottoman Turkish word yeniçeri. This Turkish word referred to slaves who were trained as soldiers for the Ottoman Empire. (The Turkish word was also adopted into English as "janissary"). The first known use of the word Genízaro in New Mexico was in the early 1660s when a politician was accused of mistreating a Genízara servant whose father was a Pueblo and whose mother was Apache/Quivira (Wichita). The term became more widely used after 1692 when the Spanish regained control of New Mexico after the Pueblo Revolt.

The word genízaro also had a military meaning in New Mexico. Genízaro militia and scouts were important in defending New Mexico from raiding Comanche, Apache, and Navajo warriors. The Genízaros were organized formally in 1808 into a Genízaro troop, commanded by a corporal from their ranks and with a supply system dedicated to them.

== History ==
Genízaros were typically Indigenous people who had been captured and enslaved by other Indian tribes and whom Franciscan monks were legally obligated to rescue by paying a ransom. The former slaves were made indentured servants to repay such debt, typically for some years.

During the late 18th century and early 19th century, Genízaros comprised a significant proportion of the population of what is now the Southwest United States. They founded a number of localities, such as Belén, Tomé, Valencia, Carnué, Los Lentes, Las Trampas, Socorro, and San Miguel del Vado. There were also genízaros in towns such as Albuquerque, Atrisco, Santa Fe, Chimayó, Taos, Abiquiú and Las Vegas.

The debt of a ransomed Genízaro, often a child, was usually 10 to 20 years of service to the person paying the ransom. Young women were especially prized. The experience of most ransomed Native Americans was "bondage on a continuum that ranged from near slavery to familial incorporation, but few shed the stigma of servility". Typically, descendants of Genízaros were also considered Genízaros. But, as in the case of the rest of colonial Mexico, this classification was not an absolute impediment to social mobility.

The Comanche and other tribes brought their captives to trade fairs and offered them for sale. In 1770, a female captive from 12 to 20 years old sold for two good horses and some small items; a male was worth only one-half as much.

Many of the Genízaros complained of mistreatment by the Spanish. Based on a policy established by the Governors of New Mexico, they were settled in land grants on the periphery of Spanish settlements. These settlements became buffer communities for larger Spanish towns in case of an attack by enemy tribes surrounding the province. The Genízaros in the frontier communities acted as mediators between the often-hostile Indian tribes surrounding the Spanish settlements and the Spanish authorities.

The following description from the 1740s of the Tome-Valencia settlements by a Spanish religious official, Fray Menchero, describes Genízaros and their settlement on land grants:

"This is a new settlement, composed of various nations [tribes], who are kept in peace, union, and charity by the special providence of God and the efforts of the missionaries,... the Indians are of the various nations that have been taken captive by the Comanche Apaches, a nation so bellicose and so brave that it dominates all those of the interior country...They sell people of all these nations to the Spaniards of the kingdom, by whom they are held in servitude, the adults being instructed by the fathers and the children baptized. It sometimes happens that the Indians are not well treated in this servitude, no thought being given to the hardships of their captivity, and still less to the fact that they are neophytes, and should be cared for and treated with kindness. For this reason many desert and become apostates.

The settlements of Tomé and Belén, just south of Albuquerque, were described by Juan Agustín Morfi as follows in 1778:

"In all the Spanish towns of New Mexico there exists a class of Indians called genízaros. These are made up of captive Comanches, Apaches, etc. who were taken as youngsters and raised among us, and who have married in the province ... They are forced to live among the Spaniards, without lands or other means to subsist except the bow and arrow which serves them when they go into the back country to hunt deer for food ... They are fine soldiers, very warlike ... Expecting the genízaros to work for daily wages is a folly because of the abuses they have experienced, especially from the alcaldes mayores in the past ... In two places, Belen and Tome, some sixty families of genizaros have congregated."

=== Tribal origins ===
According to DNA studies, Hispanos of New Mexico have significant proportions of Amerindian genes (between 30 and 40% of the Nuevomexicano genome) due to the interbreeding between Spanish and genízaros. Most genízaros were Navajo, Pawnee, Apache, Plains Apache, Ute, Comanche, and Paiute, who had been purchased at a young age and worked as domestic servants and sheepherders. Throughout the Spanish and Mexican period, Genízaros settled in several New Mexican villages such as Belén, Tomé, Valencia, Carnuel, Los Lentes, Socorro, and San Miguel del Vado. Genízaros also lived in Albuquerque, Atrisco, Santa Fe, Chimayó, Taos, Abiquiú, and Las Vegas, NM.

By the mid-18th century, the Comanche dominated the weaker tribes in the eastern plains and sold children that they kidnapped from these tribes to the Spanish villagers. By the Mexican and early American period (1821–1880), almost all Genízaros were of Navajo ancestry. During negotiations with the United States military, Navajo spokesmen raised the issue of Navajos being held as servants in Spanish/Mexican households. When asked how many Navajos were among the Mexicans, they responded: "over half the tribe." Most of the captives never returned to the Navajo Nation but remained as the lower classes in the Hispanic villages. Members of different tribes intermarried in these communities.

Presently, genízaro descendants comprise much of the population of Atrisco, Pajarito, and Barelas in the South Valley of Albuquerque, and significant portions of the population of Las Vegas in Eastern New Mexico.

=== 19th century ===
In 1821, Mexico became independent of Spain, and New Mexico became a territory within the First Mexican Empire. The Treaty of Córdoba, enacted by Mexico, decreed that Indigenous tribes within its borders were citizens of Mexico. During Spanish rule, Genízaros and Pueblo Natives were often treated as second-class citizens, although they were protected by the Laws of the Indies.

The newly independent Mexican government proclaimed social equality for all ethnic groups, and the Genízaros were officially considered equals to their vecino (villagers of mainly mixed racial backgrounds) and Pueblo neighbors. During this period, the term Genízaro was officially discontinued for church and government documents. In practice, however, Mexico was far from egalitarian. Many Genízaros remained culturally and economically marginal in New Mexican society.

Economic and social conditions during the Mexican period were so bad that in 1837, the Pueblo, Genízaros, coyotes (people with a Mestizo and an Indigenous parent), and vecinos revolted against the Mexican government. Rebels beheaded Albino Perez (the Governor of New Mexico) and killed all of the Mexican troops in Santa Fe. They formed a new government and elected as governor José González, a Genízaro of Taos Pueblo and Pawnee ancestry. The revolt was often referred to as the Chimayoso Revolt, after the community of Chimayó in northern New Mexico, which was home to José Ángel González and many other mixed-blood Indigenous peoples. The Chimayoso revolt was one of many actions against the Mexican government by Indigenous groups during this period, including the Mayan revolt in Yucatán.

== See also ==
- Mission Indians
