= Texan Santa Fe Expedition =

1841–42 failed campaign against Mexico

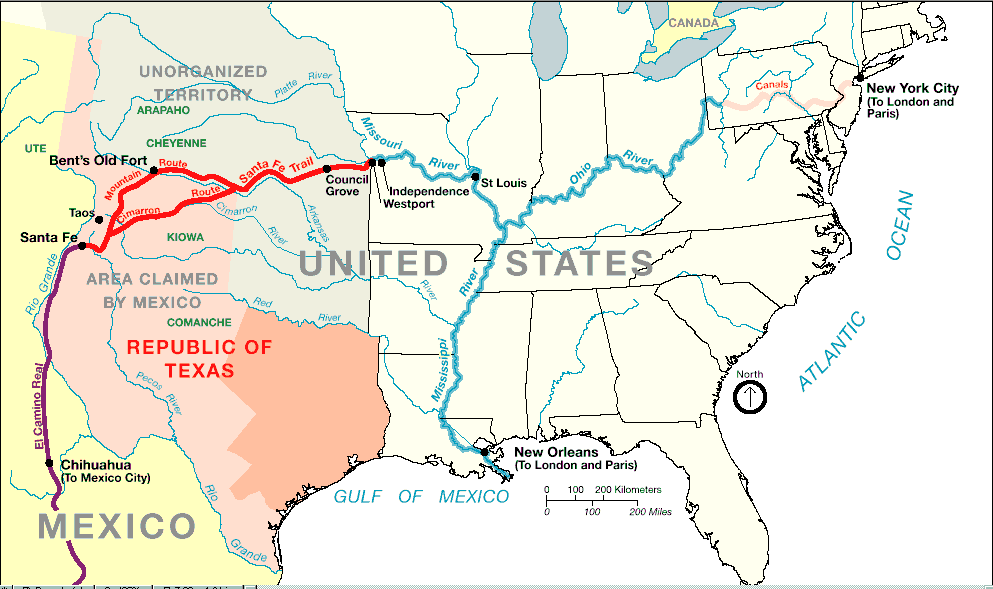
- Map of the Santa Fe Trail (in red) in 1845. A detailed present-day map is also available.
Date	June 19, 1841 – June 13, 1842
Location	New Mexico
Result	Mexican victory

Belligerents
Mexico	Texas

Commanders and leaders
Manuel Armijo	Mirabeau B. Lamar; Hugh McLeod; Robert D. Phillips (POW); William G. Lewis (POW)

Strength
1,500	320

Casualties and losses
Unknown	Unknown

The Texan Santa Fe Expedition was a failed commercial and military expedition in 1841 by the Republic of Texas with the objective of competing with the lucrative trade conducted over the Santa Fe Trail and the ulterior motive of annexing to Texas the eastern one-half of New Mexico, then a province of Mexico.

The expedition was unofficially initiated by the president of Texas, Mirabeau B. Lamar. The initiative was a major component of Lamar's ambitious plan to turn the fledgling republic into a continental power, which the president believed had to be achieved as quickly as possible to stave off the growing movement demanding the annexation of Texas to the United States. Lamar's administration had already started courting the New Mexicans, sending out a commissioner in 1840. Many Texans believed that the New Mexicans would be favorable to the idea of joining the Republic of Texas.

The expedition was a failure. Historian David Lavender called it "one of the most cockeyed ventures in American history." The Texans, approximately 320 in number, surrendered to the superior forces of New Mexican governor Manuel Armijo. The captives were marched 2,000 miles (3,200 km) south to Veracruz, Mexico. They were released in 1842 and made their way back to Texas and the United States.

== Journey ==
The present-day outlines of the U.S. states are superimposed on the boundaries of 1836–1845.

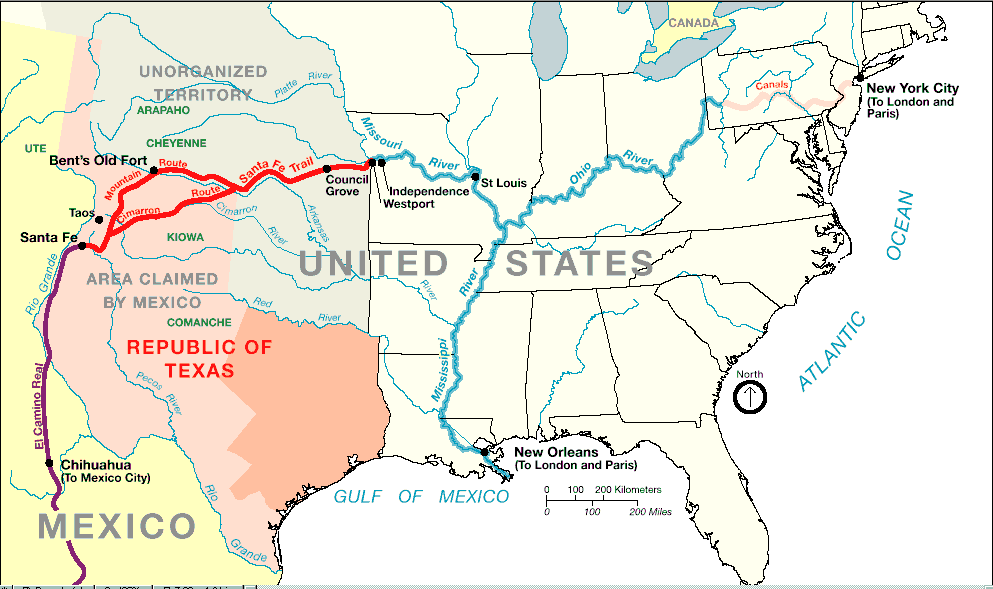
Map of the Santa Fe Trail (in red) in 1845.

The expedition set out from Kenney's Fort in present-day Round Rock near Austin on June 19, 1841. The expedition included 21 ox-drawn wagons carrying merchandise estimated to be worth about $200,000. Among the men were merchants that were promised transportation and protection of their goods during the expedition, as well as commissioners William G. Cooke, Richard F. Brenham, José Antonio Navarro, and George Van Ness, representing Lamar's administration. Although officially a trading expedition, the Texas merchants and businessmen were accompanied by a military escort of some 240 men. The military escort was led by West Point graduate and New York-native Hugh McLeod and included four companies of infantry and one of artillery. New Orleans-based journalist George Wilkins Kendall of the Picayune and English jurist Thomas Falconer also accompanied the expedition and wrote first-hand accounts afterwards.

The journey to New Mexico during the summer was blighted by poor preparation and organization, sporadic Indian attacks, and reckless wastage of supplies, particularly fresh water. After losing their Mexican guide, the group struggled to find its way, with no one knowing how far away Santa Fe actually was. McLeod was eventually forced to split his force and sent out an advance guard to find a route.

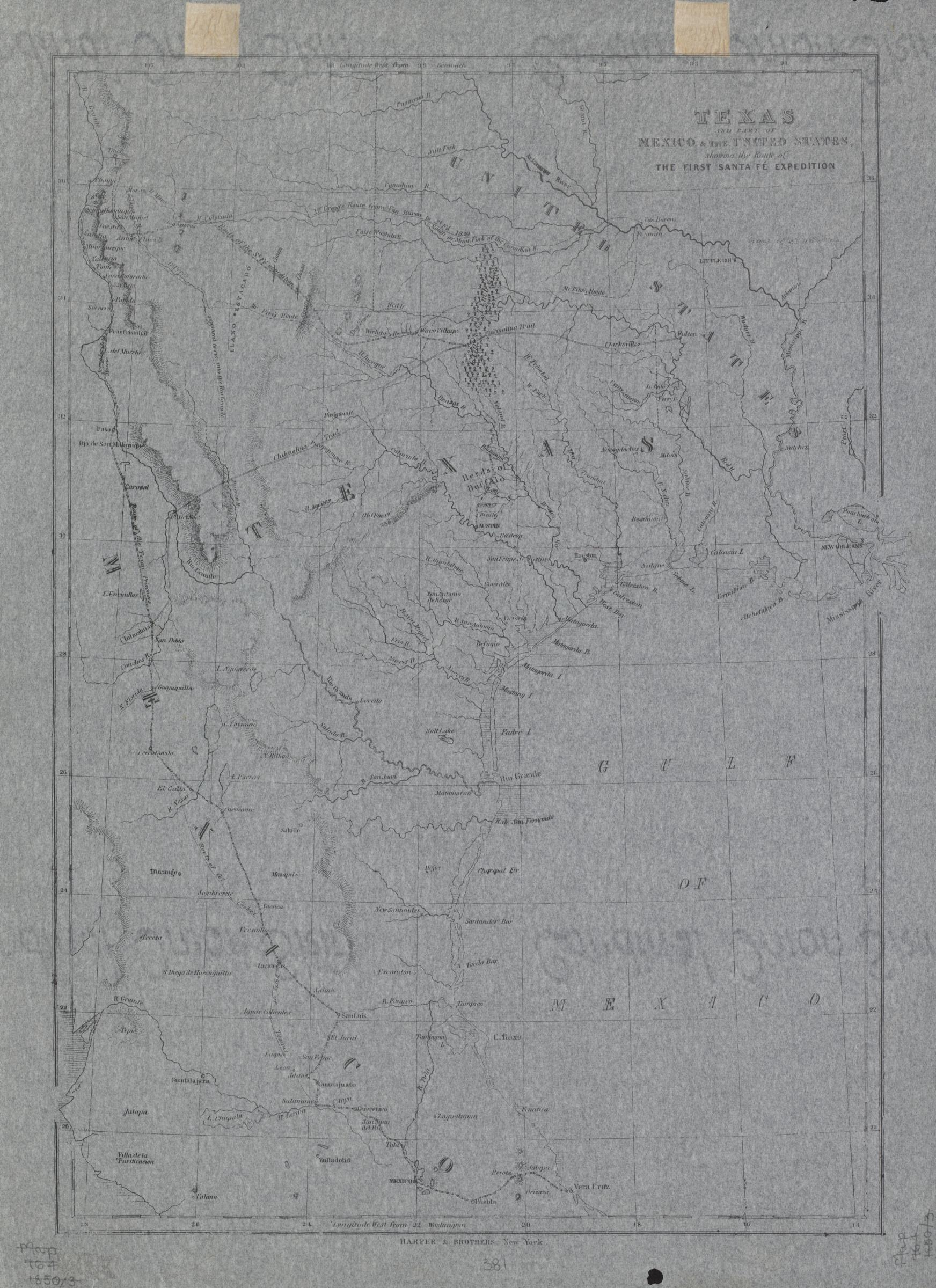
Map showing route of the first Santa Fe expedition

The advance guard, led by Cooke and John S. Sutton, finally arrived in the Pecos Valley of eastern New Mexico in mid-September 1841. From there they sent scouts ahead to try to make contact with local officials. Several of their scouts were detained, including Capt. William G. Lewis, who sent back word that they were to receive safe passage onward. However, arriving at the village of Anton Chico, the leaders were surprised to be met by a military force of about 1500 men, including many Puebloan recruits, who had been sent out to intercept them by the governor of New Mexico, Manuel Armijo. One of Armijo's relatives who spoke English, probably Manuel Chaves or Mariano Chaves, parleyed with the Texans, with Captain Lewis supporting his statements. Both said that Armijo would give the Texans safe conduct and an escort to the border, and Lewis swore to it "on his Masonic faith". After the Texans' arduous journey, they were in no state to fight a force that outnumbered them so heavily, so they surrendered. The New Mexicans gave them some supplies.

However, the following morning, Armijo arrived with his army, had the Texans bound and treated harshly, and demanded the Texans be killed, putting the matter up to a vote of his officers. That night, the prisoners listened to the council debating the idea. By one vote, the council decided to spare the Texans. The latter were forced to march the 2,000 miles from Santa Fe to Mexico City. Over the winter of 1841–42, they were held as prisoners at the Perote Prison in the state of Veracruz, until United States diplomatic efforts secured their release.

After the surviving Texans were released on June 13, 1842, one of the prisoners, Robert D. Phillips, wrote to his father that: "Many of the men are waiting only for the party of a man named Cook to arrive so they may continue on to Vera Cruz and then to New Orleans. The men found their way to New Orleans on board various ships, among them the Henry Clay, which, according to the ship's manifest, arrived in New Orleans on September 5, 1842, carrying 47 "Volunteers of the Texan Army Santa Fe Prisoners."

== Role of Native Americans ==
New Mexico enlisted Puebloans in their effort to repel Texas from expanding its borders in the early 1840s. In 1843 the effort "fell heavily on Taos Indians who were impressed into service to ward off the Texas invaders."

== Aftermath ==
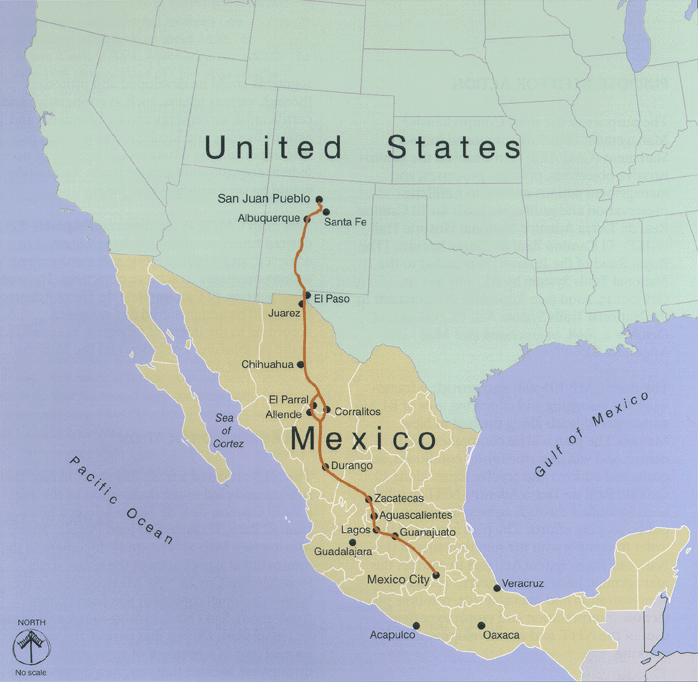
The Texas prisoners were marched south on the Camino Real de Tierra Adentro to a prison in Veracruz.

Lewis was widely considered a traitor by the people of Texas, but the options facing the Texians were stark, and standing and fighting would almost certainly have led to their annihilation. Furthermore, there is no information on whether Lewis or Chaves knew Armijo's real intentions. For the rest of his life, Chaves vehemently insisted that he had personally acted in good faith in dealing with the Texians.

Already under serious criticism for his mishandling of the Texian economy, Lamar was widely held responsible for the disaster and the expedition further tarnished his presidency. More importantly, the episode offered clear and convincing proof that Texas did not have the resources to maintain even a tenuous control over its claimed western territories. In Texas, where the majority of voters were born in the United States, unenthusiastic at best with respect to Lamar's ambitious expansionist agenda and skeptical of the very existence of a Texan national identity distinct from the U.S., such a fiasco was enough to convince many citizens to abandon whatever aspirations they had to maintain Texian independence, as they became convinced that a fledgling Republic effectively hemmed in at the Nueces River and constantly threatened with Mexican invasion could not realistically hope to be a viable country on its own. Whereas Lamar had openly boasted of plans to turn Texas into one of the continent's great powers, following the expedition Texians turned to Lamar's predecessor, the Texas Revolution war hero Sam Houston who was the leading political figure advocating annexation to the United States. In 1845, Texas was admitted to the Union.

The annexation changed the ongoing border dispute from being a quarrel between Mexico and Texas to one involving Mexico and the United States. This (combined with controversy over Mexico's treatment of Texian prisoners) helped to increase tensions between the United States and Mexico, leading up to the Mexican–American War. After Armijo surrendered Santa Fe to the U.S. Army without firing a shot, Chaves formally switched allegiance to the U.S.

The war ended in victory for the United States and gave the U.S. undisputed control of all of the lands that at this point were still claimed by the State of Texas. However, Texas faced stiff opposition from within the U.S. in its bid to actually administer these lands. This resistance came largely from other Southern states, which wanted Texas' western territorial claim carved into new slave states that would maintain the balance of power in the United States Senate.

As part of the wider Compromise of 1850 between slave states and free states, the now Texan state government agreed to relinquish its northwesternmost territorial claims, including the Santa Fe region that had been the focus of Lamar's expedition. In return, the federal government agreed to assume responsibility for Texan state debts. Texas was left in control of its present boundaries, which was still an area around twice the size of the territory it had ever effectively controlled as a Republic. Most of the remaining lands were organized into the New Mexico Territory while the northernmost strip remained unorganized. Armijo, who returned to New Mexico after the war, died there in 1853.

The final disposition of these regions was not settled prior to the outbreak of the American Civil War in 1861, during which the Confederacy attempted to establish its own control of the region based in part on the old Texan claims. The conflict placed Chaves and the Texans on opposing sides once more, as Chaves remained loyal to the Union. Texan troops fighting under the Confederate banner would play a major role in the Confederates' unsuccessful attempt to control present-day New Mexico, while Chaves himself played a key role in the decisive Battle of Glorieta Pass.

== In popular culture ==
A Texas Ranger is mentioned as being a "Santa Fe expeditioner" in The Captain of the Rifles; or, The Queen of the Lakes: A Romance of the Mexican Valley (1879) by Capt. Thomas Mayne Reid, having "spent over twelve months in Mexican prisons." The expedition also forms the backdrop to Clarence E. Mulford's 1922 novel Bring Me His Ears and to Larry McMurtry's 1995 novel Dead Man's Walk; also the 1996 TV miniseries - which is part of the Lonesome Dove series.
