= Origins of New Mexico Families =

Book by Angelico Chavez

Origins of New Mexico Families: A Genealogy of the Spanish Colonial Period
- Author: Fray Angélico Chávez
- Illustrator: Jose Cisneros
- Genre: Genealogy
- Publisher: Historical Society of New Mexico
- Publication date: 1954

Origins of New Mexico Families: A Genealogy of the Spanish Colonial Period by Fray Angélico Chávez is an important work on the genealogy of Spanish New Mexican families. The first edition was published in 1954; a revised edition came out in 1992.

== Description ==
In researching the history of the statue La Conquistadora, Chávez came across a number of old church documents. These documents included baptisms, marriages and other vital records detailing the lives of the early Mexican settlers of New Mexico. Chávez realized the value that these documents had to the descendants of these people and began collecting the information in order to create a genealogy about early New Mexicans. Origins of New Mexico Families is the culmination of this research.

The book itself is divided into two parts: the seventeenth and eighteenth centuries. Chávez himself admitted in his Introduction that the family histories in the book do not necessarily conform perfectly to these divisions. Chávez discovered two distinct colonizations of New Mexico. The first colonization occurred in 1598 under the leadership of don Juan de Oñate. In 1680 Pueblo Indians revolted against colonial rule and the settlers were forced out of New Mexico. In 1693 Diego de Vargas led a second group of families into New Mexico to re-colonize the province.

Both parts are further divided up into family surnames. Each surname section typically begins with that family's male progenitor and includes information on his wife (or wives), children and grandchildren. Some of the family genealogies from the first part continue on into the second part. There are a number of different surnames in the second part because there were new families that entered New Mexico in the eighteenth century and that certain families did not return to New Mexico after the Pueblo Revolt.

The book includes drawings, photocopies and charts. Two drawings by José Cisneros (artist) depict the "Oñate Entrada" of 1598 and the "Vargas Entrada" of 1693. The photocopies are of certain documents such as a pages from inquisition records, matrimonial investigations, and marriage registers. Charts within the book demonstrate specific lineages of Españoles-Mexicanos, French and north-south Spanish, and ordained clerics within the Ortiz family.

Throughout the book, Chávez linked many of the families to himself. In his introduction he acknowledged that this may look presumptive, but that his intention was actually to create a "graphic unifying medium" in order to lend direction to the compilation of loose facts. He wanted to demonstrate that all New Mexicans were part of one large family and inter-related. Since early New Mexicans did not include any great nobles or major historical figures, Chávez wanted to show that there was a reason for New Mexicans to delve into their own genealogy.

== Differences between the two editions ==
As mentioned before, the first edition only included a genealogy of families from the seventeen and eighteenth century. However, Chávez continued doing research on New Mexico families and in 1956 and 1957 he published a couple of articles in the magazine El Palacio. These articles expanded some of the family genealogies into the nineteenth century and included many names that were unique to that century. In 1992 the editor of the revised edition Thomas E. Chávez added these articles to the book.

== Contents of the revised edition ==
- Foreword to revised edition
- Introduction
- Oñate Entrada by José Cisneros

=== Part One: The Seventeenth Century ===
- Families alphabetically: Abendaño to Zamorano
  - Demonstration Chart (Chávez)
  - Page from Inquisition Records, 1626
  - Demonstration Chart (Robledo-Romero)

=== Part Two: The Eighteenth Century ===
- Vargas Entrada by José Cisneros
- Families Alphabetically: Abeyta to Zamora
  - Page from Matrimonial Investigation, 1716
  - Demonstration Charts I and II (Baca)
  - Page from Santa Fe Marriage Register, 1734
  - Page from Spanish Archives of New Mexico, 1712
  - Demonstration Chart (Españoles-Mexicanos)
  - Demonstration Chart (French and North-South Spanish)

=== Appendix ===
- Additional Family Couples in Charts and Other Persons
  - Demonstration Chart (Ortiz Clerical)

=== Addenda to original 1954 edition ===
- Families alphabetically: Abeyta to Zarate
- New names in New Mexico, 1820-1850
- Families alphabetically: Abilucia to Zepeda
- Bibliography

== See also ==
- Baca family of New Mexico
- Angelico Chavez
