= Angelico Chavez =

Hispanic American Friar minor, priest, historian, author, poet, and painter

Angelico Chavez, O.F.M.
- Statue of Angelico Chavez
- Born: Manuel Ezequiel Chávez; April 10, 1910; Wagon Mound, New Mexico, U.S.
- Died: March 18, 1996 (aged 85); Santa Fe, New Mexico, U.S.
- Occupations: Friar minor; priest; writer; painter; historian
- Writing career
- Subject: New Mexico history
- Notable works: "The Virgin of Port Lligat"; My Penitente Land

Angelico Chavez, O.F.M. (April 10, 1910 – March 18, 1996), was a Latino Friar Minor, priest, historian, author, poet and painter. "Angelico" was his pen name; he also dropped the accent marks from this name.

== Early life ==
Born the first of ten children to Fabián Chávez and María Nicolasa Roybal de Chávez in Wagon Mound, New Mexico, Chavez was baptized with the name Manuel Ezequiel. He was a 12th-generation New Mexican, whose family had been in the area since the first colonial settlement of 1598. In 1912, his family moved to San Diego, California, where his father worked for the Panama–California Exposition. The missions he was exposed to in California inspired him to follow in the footsteps of Junípero Serra and the other missionaries to the Native Americans.

== Education ==
Returning to New Mexico, Chavez attended public schools in Mora, staffed by members of the Sisters of Loretto. In 1924, at the age of 14, Chavez was admitted to St. Francis Seminary in Mount Healthy, Ohio, a suburb of Cincinnati.

While at the seminary, Chavez endeavored to improve his English (his second language) through a study of the classic literature of the language. He began writing fiction, essays, and other works at this time, several of which were published in the Brown and White, the student magazine he later edited.

As a member of the first class to inhabit the seminary's new dormitory, Chavez was allowed to paint murals of Francis of Assisi and Anthony of Padua on its walls.

On August 15, 1929, Chavez was received in the novitiate of the Friars Minors and received the Franciscan habit. Due to his potential as a visual artist, he was given the religious name "Frater Angélico" after the Dominican priest and painter Fra Angelico from Florence. He continued his studies at Duns Scotus College in Detroit, graduating in 1933. He studied for four more years before being ordained in 1937 at Saint Francis Cathedral in Santa Fe, the first native New Mexican Franciscan priest.

While Fray Angélico was the first native New Mexican Franciscan priest, two female first-cousins from Nacimiento, New Mexico had entered the Franciscan order as religious sisters in April 1914. So, they were the first native New Mexicans to become Franciscans. Elsira Montoya and Dolores Lucero entered religious life in St. Louis, Missouri and spent the remaining 70 and 75 years of their lives as Franciscan nuns.

== Priesthood ==
Chavez was assigned to the parish of Our Lady of Guadalupe in Peña Blanca and its missions in Jémez Pueblo and Los Cerrillos. At Peña Blanca, he undertook a revitalization of the church building, painting frescoes on its walls. He was his own model for the figure of Pontius Pilate, and also used locals and three of his sisters as figure models. He also ministered to the local Native Americans of San Felipe Pueblo, Santo Domingo Pueblo, and the Pueblo of Cochiti.

During World War II, Chavez attended the chaplaincy school at Harvard University and was placed with the 77th Infantry Division. He was present for the beach landings of Guam and Leyte. He continued his military service during the Korean War as chaplain at Fort Bliss, Texas, and Kaiserslautern, Germany.

== Career ==
Upon his return from the battlefield, Chavez was appointed archivist of the Archdiocese of Santa Fe and undertook the cataloging and translation of its Spanish archives. This work provided new primary sources that allowed for a reevaluation of the history of New Mexico. He wrote the definitive work on the families of New Mexico, as well as many other works of history, some of which is considered revisionist. For example, his view of the Pueblo Revolt of 1680, unorthodox in its minimization of the role of Popé and its emphasis on the Indigenous element, was based primarily on previously-unconsidered genealogical data.

Chavez' biography of Antonio José Martínez (1793–1867), But Time and Chance, was the first of a trilogy of biographies on significant native New Mexican priests.

But Time and Chance is a scholarly and balanced treatment of the Cura de Taos whose life story had been distorted by some authors. In 1846, General Stephen W. Kearny swore Martínez as the first United States citizen of the Territory of New Mexico. Within six months, however, his political enemies wrongly alleged that Padre Martinez instigated the Taos Uprising of 1847—one of the last events of the US–Mexican War. Padre Martínez was very influential in New Mexico and beyond as a religious figure, rancher, educator, author and publisher, lawyer, and politician. He was in conflict with his superior Bishop Lamy regarding the issue of tithing and other matters. As a result, Martinez suffered ecclesiastical censure in 1858. When he died in 1867, his peers in the Territorial Assembly called him "La Honra de Su Pais", the honor of his homeland.

Among the general populace, Chavez is most known for the book entitled La Conquistadora, the Autobiography of an Ancient Statue. This work told the story, in a first-person narrative, of a statue of the Virgin Mary brought from Spain over 400 years ago, through Mexico to New Mexico. The statue resides in St. Francis Cathedral to this day and is a part of the religious history of the Latino people of Northern New Mexico.

Chavez also wrote short stories, novels, and poetry. His poem The Virgin of Port Lligat, based on Salvador Dalí's The Madonna of Port Lligat, was selected as one of the best books of 1959 by the Catholic Library Association and was praised by T. S. Eliot as a "very commendable achievement". As Chavez scholar Genaro M. Padilla notes, "despite [his] outpouring of history, poetry, and fiction, Fray Angelico Chavez has been largely overlooked as one of the pioneers of Chicano [sic] literature in century".

In 1971, he left the priesthood following a "crisis of faith", but retained his standing as a priest while continuing his writing and research. He returned to the priesthood and the Franciscan Order in 1989 and lived at the friary at the Cathedral in Santa Fe. He died on March 18, 1996, in Santa Fe, New Mexico, at the age of 85.

Chavez was buried in Rosario Cemetery, having earlier refused burial in St. Francis Cathedral in Santa Fe. The Museum of New Mexico at the Palace of the Governors named the new history and photographic library in his honor following his death, and a bronze statue of his likeness is displayed at the entrance. Judge Harry Long Bigbee was the donor of the statue. In August 2020, the statue along with the walls of the museum were defaced with spray paint. The walls were marked with the words "stolen land" and "1680", an apparent reference to the Pueblo Revolt, an event chronicled by Chavez in what has been criticized as a revisionist interpretation.

== Honorary degrees ==
- Master of Arts, University of New Mexico, 1947
- Doctor of Letters, College of St. Joseph on the Rio Grande, Albuquerque, 1963
- Doctor of Law, New Mexico State University, Las Cruces, 1973
- Doctor of Humane Letters, University of New Mexico, 1974

== Publications ==
=== Non-fiction ===
- But time and chance: the story of Padre Martinez of Taos, 1793-1867. Santa Fe: Sunstone Press, 1981. ISBN 0-913270-95-4
- La Conquistadora: the autobiography of an ancient statue. Santa Fe: Sunstone Press, 1975. ISBN 0-913270-43-1
- Coronado's friars. Washington: Academy of American Franciscan History, 1968.
- My Penitente land: reflections on Spanish New Mexico. Albuquerque: University of New Mexico Press, 1974. ISBN 0-8263-0334-X
- Chávez : a distinctive American clan of New Mexico. Santa Fe, N.M. : W. Gannon, 1989. ISBN 0-88307-675-6
- Origins of New Mexico families: a genealogy of the Spanish colonial period. Santa Fe: Museum of New Mexico Press, 1992. ISBN 0-89013-239-9

=== Fiction ===
- When the Santos Talked; A Retablo of New Mexico Tales -- Drawings by Peter Hurd. Santa Fe: W. Gannon, 1977.
- New Mexico Triptych: being three panels and three accounts. Santa Fe: W. Gannon, 1976.
- From an altar screen; El Retablo: tales from New Mexico. Freeport, N.Y., Books for Libraries Press, 1969. ISBN 0-8361-3031-2
- The Lady from Toledo. Fresno, California: Academy Guild Press, 1960.

=== Poetry ===
- The Virgin of Port Lligat.
- Eleven Lady-lyrics, and other poems. Paterson, New Jersey: St. Anthony Guild Press, 1945.
- Cantares: canticles and poems of youth, 1925-1932. Edited and with an introduction by Nasario García. Houston: Arte Público Press, 2000. ISBN 1-55885-311-1
- Selected poems, with an apologia. Santa Fe: Press of the Territorian, 1969

== Bibliographical Resources ==
https://faculty.ucmerced.edu/mmartin-rodriguez/index_files/vhChavezAngelico.htm

== See also ==
- Christianity in the United States
