= Alonso Rael de Aguilar =

Alonso Rael de Aguilar was a high-ranking soldier under Diego de Vargas, serving as Secretary of State and War. Born in February 1661 in Lorca, Murcia, Spain, he arrived in what is now El Paso, Texas by about 1683. He accompanied Diego de Vargas on the 1692 reconquest of the New Mexico Territory for Spain, the anniversary of which is celebrated to this day as the Fiestas de Santa Fe. Rael de Aguilar later served as mayor of Santa Fe. He is the progenitor of the Rael surname throughout the southwest United States of America, notably New Mexico and Colorado.

Rael received a land grant near Cerillos, New Mexico, but apparently abandoned it, and in 1788, the ownership of this grant passed to Rael's granddaughter's husband, Jose Miguel de la Pena. Rael's name also appears twice in the 2001 U.S. General Accounting Office's published report on New Mexican land grants, but the disposition of the grants isn't disclosed in the study.

== Involvement in the Villasur Expedition ==
Rael de Aguilar served as an auxiliary in the Villasur Expedition of 1720, a Spanish reconnaissance mission led by Lieutenant-General Pedro de Villasur tasked with locating reported French encroachments on the northern frontier of New Mexico.

On August 9, after the expedition crossed the North Platte River — referred to by the Spanish as the Rio San Lorenzo — the company made camp at the junction of the South and North Platte rivers, near present-day Columbus, Nebraska. On August 10, Villasur's Pawnee interpreter was sent across the river to make contact with a nearby Pawnee village but did not return. When a replacement Pawnee emissary arrived whom the Spanish could not understand, Villasur called a council of war to deliberate on whether to cross the river and gather intelligence. According to Rael de Aguilar's testimony, he and others supported the crossing, but a majority of the council opposed it, arguing the Pawnee had already demonstrated bad faith by detaining the interpreter. The expedition retreated on August 11, recrossing the North Platte around four o'clock in the afternoon and making camp on the south bank.

On the morning of August 14, while the camp was in the process of breaking camp and saddling horses, Pawnee and Otoe warriors launched a sudden dawn attack. Surprise was total, and the horse herd stampeded almost immediately. The majority of the camp was surrounded and fired upon from all sides. Of the expedition's force, between 33 and 35 Spaniards and 11 Native American allies were killed; only 12 or 13 Spanish soldiers survived. Rael de Aguilar was among the survivors, having been rescued when a group of Spaniards recovered the horse herd and returned to the battlefield. He sustained nine wounds and was scalped during the assault.

Rael de Aguilar later testified that while the mounted soldiers who had recovered the horse herd were able to push back the attackers, they returned to find that the majority of those left behind could no longer be aided. In his testimony he stated that "while those who were mounted were sufficient to make [the attackers] retreat, the rest were unable to aid, as they were already dead." His testimony further indicates that only three survivors were rescued from the surrounded main camp in this manner. He further testified that virtually all of the expedition's provisions and equipment had been abandoned on the battlefield during the retreat.

Upon the survivors' return to Santa Fe on September 6, 1720, Acting Governor Valverde took formal depositions from the survivors. Rael de Aguilar's testimony, preserved in the colonial archive Provincias Internas, became one of the primary sources for reconstructing the events of the battle. The investigation that followed resulted in Valverde being found guilty of negligence by a court of inquiry for entrusting the mission to an inexperienced commander, though he was ultimately required to pay only a small fine.

== Jewish Origins ==
Alonso Rael de Aguilar's departure from Spain "came on the heels of a renewed campaign against crypto-Jews by the Holy Office of Murcia in the early 1680s." The similarities between the surname Rael and the appellation Israel were apparent and, at least locally, connected according to Dr. Stanley Hordes and his research. For instance, Dr. Hordes discovered that "Alonso's granddaughter María Manuela Rael de Aguilar, a resident of the Río Abajo town of Tomé, is mentioned three times in the baptismal records for 1756 of the nearby mission church of the pueblo of Isleta, as María Manuela Ysrael de Aguilar, an indication that the parish priests, and likely the entire community, were aware of the family's ethnicity," and he discovered that "the connection between the surnames Rael and Israel may be traced back almost three hundred years earlier, to the fifteenth-century..."
