= Zozobra =

Giant marionette effigy burned annually in Santa Fe, New Mexico

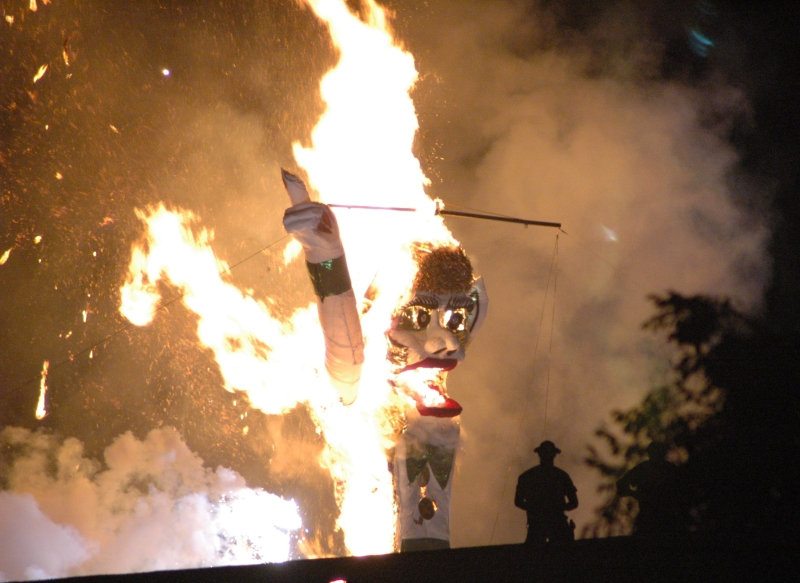
- Zozobra Burning in September 2005
- Begins: Around the end of August and start of September
- Frequency: Yearly
- Venue: Fort Marcy (New Mexico)
- Location: Santa Fe, New Mexico
- Founder: Will Shuster
- Organiser: Kiwanis

Zozobra (also known as Old Man Gloom and sometimes branded as The Burning of Will Shuster's Zozobra) is a giant marionette effigy constructed of wood, wire and cotton cloth that is built and burned on the Friday of Labor Day weekend prior to the annual Fiestas de Santa Fe in Santa Fe, New Mexico, United States. It stands 50 ft 6 in (15.39 m) high.

== Burnt articles ==
The name is taken from the Spanish word zozobra referring to a strong feeling of anxiety or worries, and as its name suggests, the effigy embodies gloom and anxiety; by burning it, people destroy the worries and troubles of the previous year in the flames. Anyone with an excess of gloom is encouraged to write down the nature of their gloom on a slip of paper and leave it in the "gloom box" found in the City of Santa Fe Visitors' Centers in the weeks leading up to the burn. Participants are also welcome to add their glooms at the annual ZozoFest, a festive precursor event that takes place the weekend before Zozobra burns. Those who attend the burning can also add documents at the venue on the day of the burning, up until 8 pm MT, at a "gloom tent," where they can add their woes to the puppets stuffing. All the bad stuff,divorce documents, mortgage pay-offs, parking tickets, a Martin guitar and even a wedding dress –– have all found their way into Zozobra to go up in smoke. At the festival, glooms from the gloom box are placed inside Zozobra to be burned alongside it.

== History ==
Fiestas de Santa Fe has been held since 1712 to celebrate the Spanish reconquest of the city in 1692 by Don Diego de Vargas from the Pueblo tribes who had occupied the city since the Pueblo Revolt of 1680. The burning of Zozobra dates from 1924, when artist William Howard Shuster, Jr. created and then burned the first Zozobra in his backyard at a party for his friends and fellow artists. "Zozobra" is a Spanish word for anxiety, worry, or sinking and was chosen by Shuster and newspaper editor E. Dana Johnson after a trip they made to Mexico. It is said that the idea was influenced by Mexican cartonería (papier-mâché sculpture), specifically the effigies exploded during the burning of Judas that takes place on Holy Saturday or New Year's Eve, as a way of ridding oneself or one's community of evil.

== Modern celebration ==
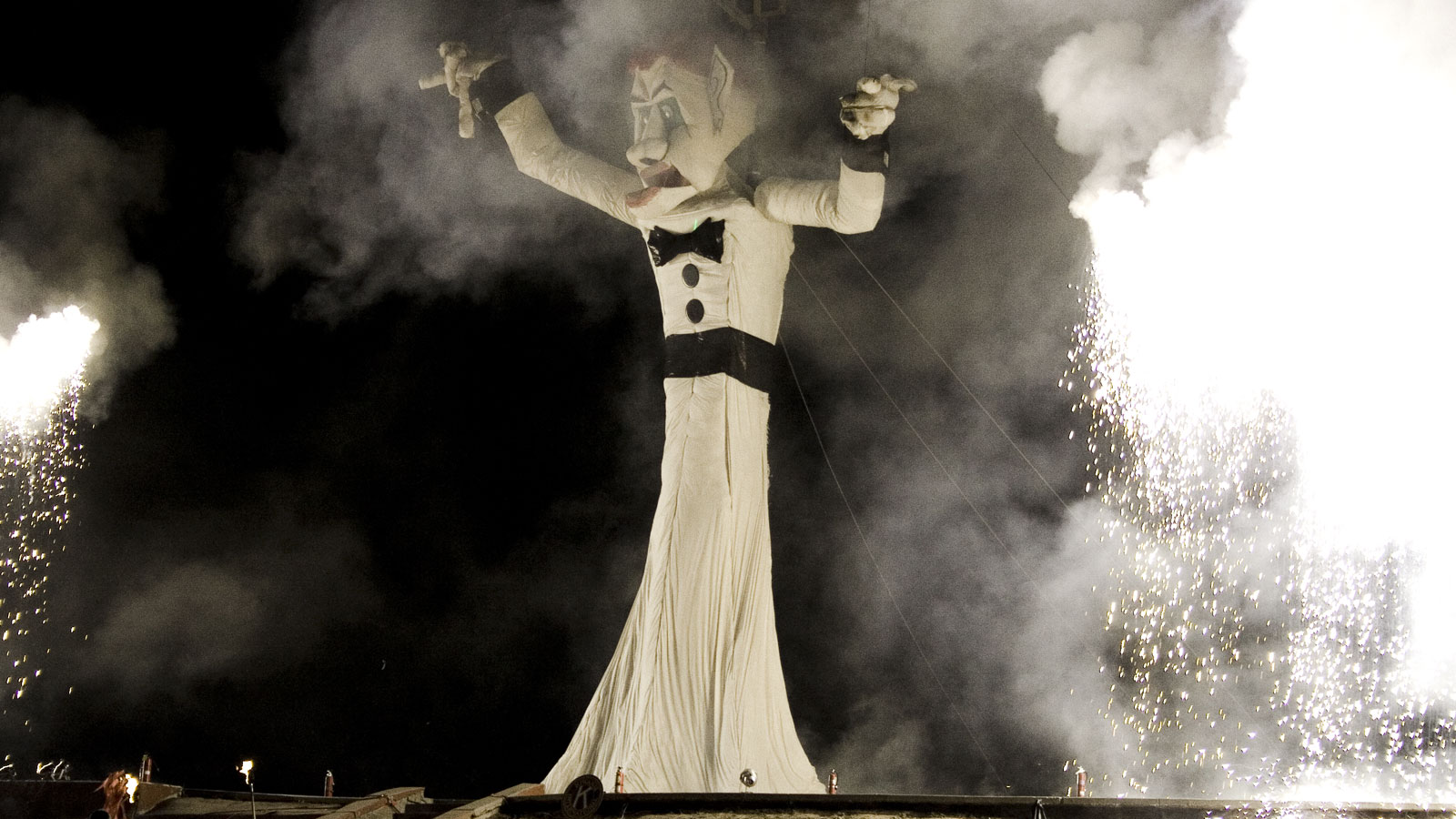
Zozobra starting to burn

Each year in Santa Fe, New Mexico, over 60,000 people attend the event and hundreds of thousands watch online. The Labor Day Friday Burning of Zozobra is followed by a festive arts and crafts fair that launches the Santa Fe Fiesta over the Labor Day weekend. The following weekend welcomes the Santa Fe Fiesta Desfile de Los Niños, the Children's Pet Parade, on Saturday, the Hysterical-Historical Parade on Sunday, and a traditional mass at St. Francis Cathedral.

Since receiving all rights to the Zozobra pageant in 1964 from creator Will Shuster, the Kiwanis Club of Santa Fe has built Zozobra and burned the effigy at Fort Marcy Park. The Zozobra that burned on September 7, 2007, was certified by Guinness World Records as the largest marionette in the world, at the time measuring 15.21 m (49 ft 10.82 in) in height.

The Burning of Zozobra was traditionally held in September, however, attendance at the event improved in 2014 when it was moved to the Friday immediately before Labor Day.

=== Event description ===
Event gates open at 4 pm and live entertainment leads up to the official pageant that begins at 7 p.m., featuring live music, performances, a beachball toss and a performance of America's national anthem. Lights-out music signals the start of the ritual tradition, and the annual drama begins in earnest. Zozobra begins to move, looking side to side and calling out his "Gloomies." A group of youthful dancers symbolize the children of Santa Fe, whom Zozobra has converted into his minions by clouding their minds and robbing them of their hope and happiness. A group of torchbearers arrives, representing brave townsfolk who come to fight Zozobra's dark intentions to destroy the city's future. Zozobra's force is great and his Gloomies frighten away the torchbearers, who drop their flaming torches and scatter. Zozobra and his Gloomies celebrate, but the watching crowd is energized and begins to chant "burn him, burn him."

Summoned by this urgent call for help, a Fire Spirit materializes, dressed in red with a headdress, symbolizing Old Man Gloom's archenemy. and representing goodness and light called forth to destroy the gloom and bad energy of the year. The Fire Spirit chases away the Gloomies and dances in a battle with Zozobra, whose arms and head move as he growls and groans. Zozobra becomes incensed when the Fire Spirit takes up a pair of flaming torches to taunt him with the possibility of destruction. The struggle between light and darkness is finally consummated when the marionette is set alight by a series of internal fireworks and finally collapses, amidst a massive display of fireworks overhead, said to be creator Shuster's way of painting the sky. As the last of Zozobra smolders in a pile of glowing embers, the watching crowd joyously celebrates the victory of light over darkness. The burning of Zozobra has been followed by the playing of "La Fiesta de Santa Fe" and a fireworks display.

Only three individuals to date have consecutively performed as the Fire Spirit: Jacques Cartier, originator of the role; James "Chip” Lilienthal, his protege; and Helene Luna, the current Fire Spirit, who previously performed as the Gloom Queen, a pageant role designed to give the new trainee an opportunity to perform onstage in advance of becoming the Fire Spirit.

In 2024, an audition for a new Fire Spirit was held in anticipation of Helene Luna's retirement; her final performance was in 2026. Than Povi Martinez, a Na Poh’Woh’Geh Owingeh native, will assume the role in 2027. During the 2024 event, Ms. Martinez keenly observed the logistics and pageant flow in preparation to perform as the Gloom Queen in 2025 and 2026. Once Ms. Martinez becomes the Fire Spirit in 2027, the role of the Gloom Queen will be retired again until a new Fire Spirit once again needs to be selected.

== List of Zozobra-burning events & Voices Of Zozobra ==
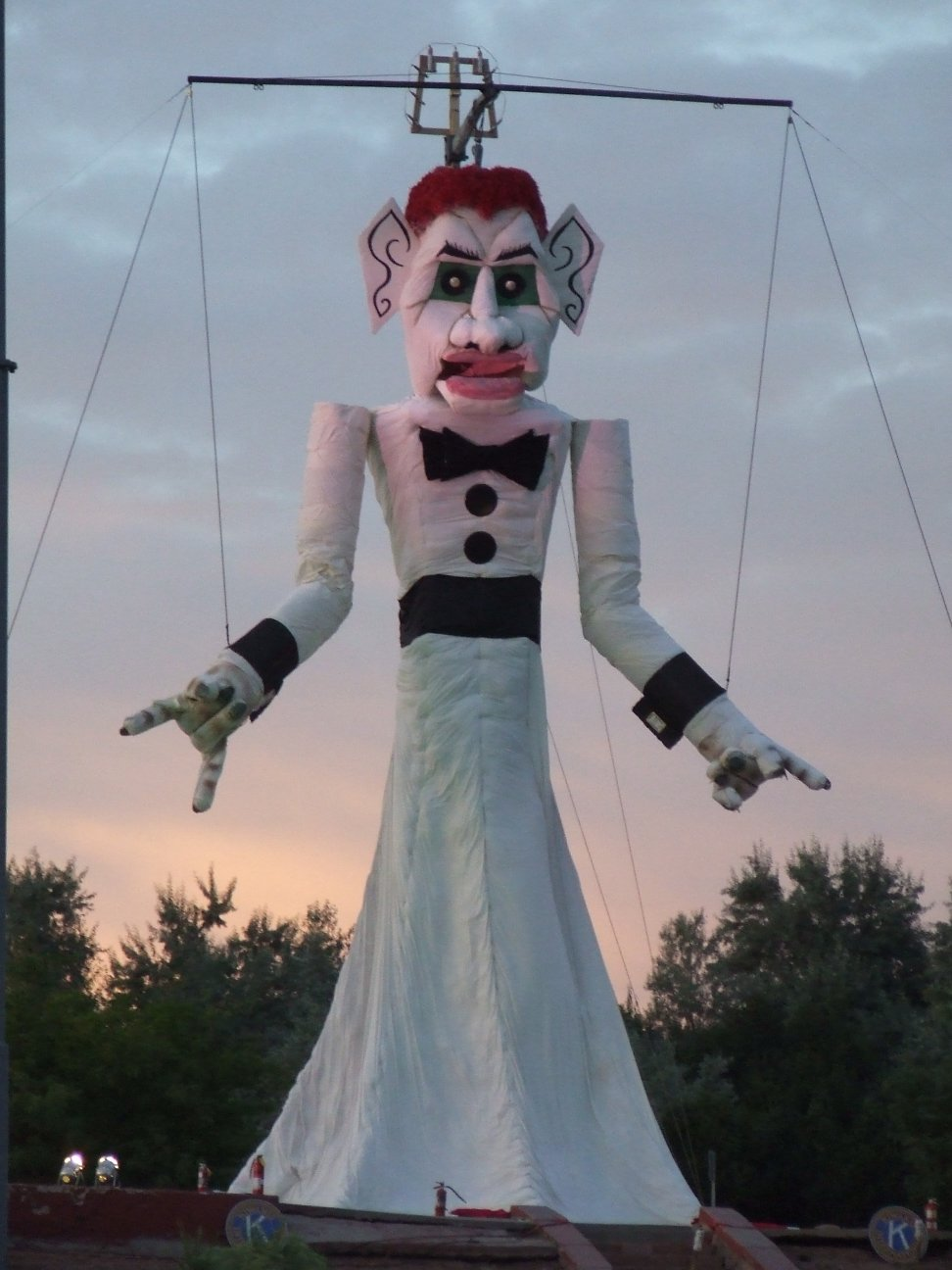
2007 Zozobra with red hair

The color of his hair changes each year.

- September 3, 1993— silver
- September 9, 1994 — copper
- September 8, 1995 — neon yellow
- September 6, 1996 — silver
- September 5, 1997 — red
- September 10, 1998 — salt and pepper hair made out of grey and white cheerleader pom-poms with mirrors for silver eye pupils (also the first Zozobra to burn on a Thursday)
- September 9, 1999 — orange with red hair highlights
- September 7, 2000 — yellow
- September 6, 2001 — purple
- September 5, 2002 — turquoise
- September 4, 2003 — lavender
- September 9, 2004 — orange
- September 8, 2005 — brown
- September 12, 2006 — silver
- September 6, 2007 — red
- September 4, 2008 — green
- September 10, 2009 — red
- September 9, 2010 — blue
- September 8, 2011 — purple
- September 6, 2012 — yellow
- September 5, 2013 — green

THE DECADES PROJECT OF ZOZOBRA:

- August 29, 2014 — neon yellow
- September 4, 2015 — bald
- September 2, 2016 — black combover with Fedora (Note: with black-and-white fedora, after Santa Fean boy Seth Cole suggested at the annual community meeting that Zozobra should wear a hat)
- September 1, 2017 — orange-red
- August 31, 2018 — silver
- August 30, 2019 — mustard yellow
- September 4, 2020 — COVID-Zozobra had silver hair with red triangles and orange ping-pong balls to represent the coronavirus. His buttons read "2020" and he wore gold murder hornet cufflinks.
- September 3, 2021 — white
- September 2, 2022 — copper with gold frosted tips
- September 1, 2023 — turquoise
- August 30, 2024 — gold
- August 29, 2025 — turquoise with brown hat
- September 4, 2026 — powdered wig with crown
- September 3, 2027 — TBD

Voices Of Zozobra:

- Harold Gans: 1982-1993
- Michael Ellis: 1994
- Harold Gans: 1995-2002
- Ken Garley and Rod McNamara: 2003-2012
- Michael Ellis: 2013-2019
- Anthony Michaels Moore: 2020-2021
- Bill Parnall: 2022–present (Elmer "Butterfly" Garcia and Evan Galpert, understudies)

== Related practices ==
The Burning of Zozobra, which predates the Burning Man festival, is similar to related activities such as the Cremation of Care, the burning of Judas in Europe, the druid concept of the wicker man and the idea of Pappanji in Keralan culture.

== Popular media ==
Zozobra was briefly seen in Eddington (Movie Poster)

== Gallery ==
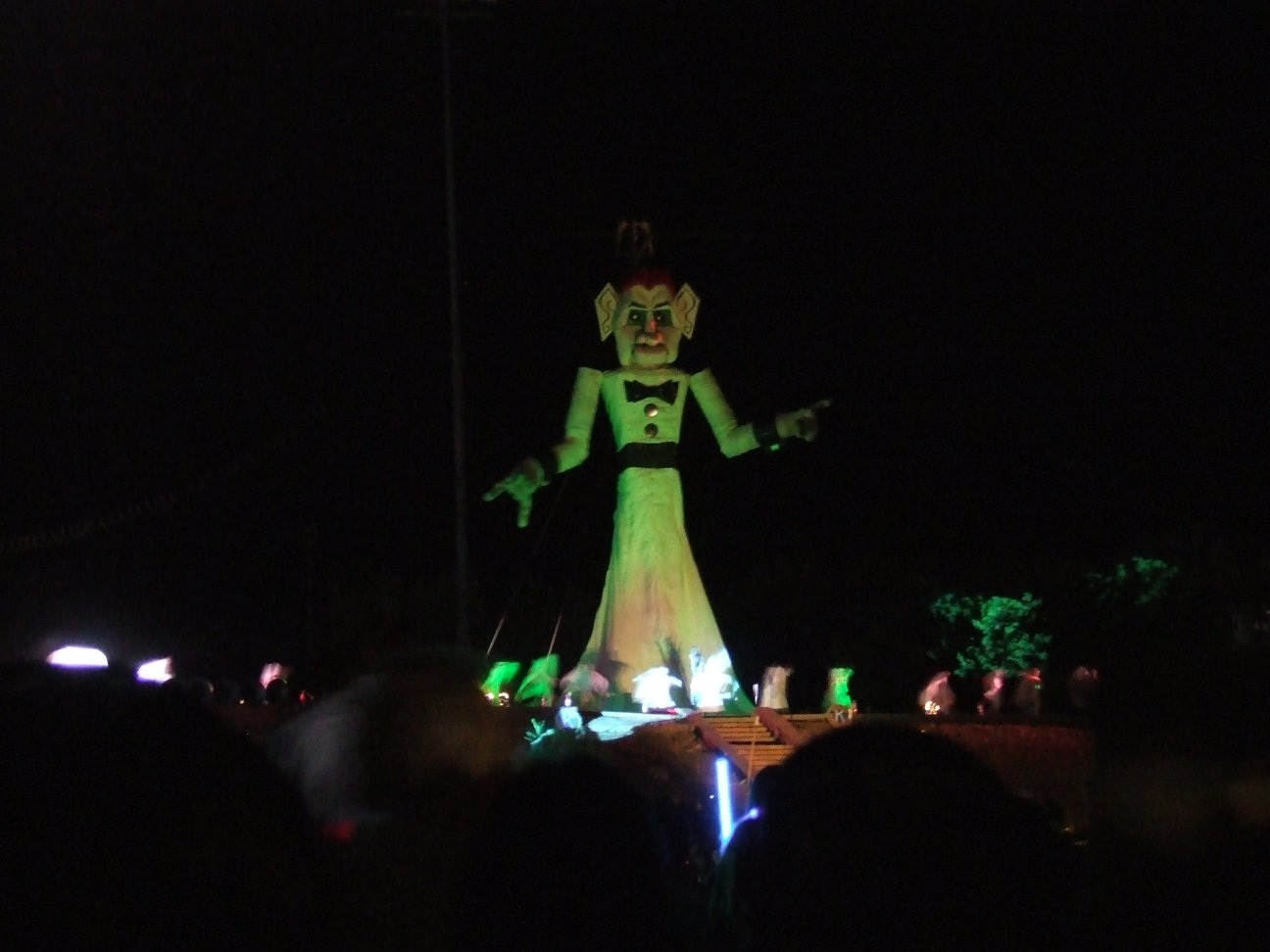
Commencement of ceremonies

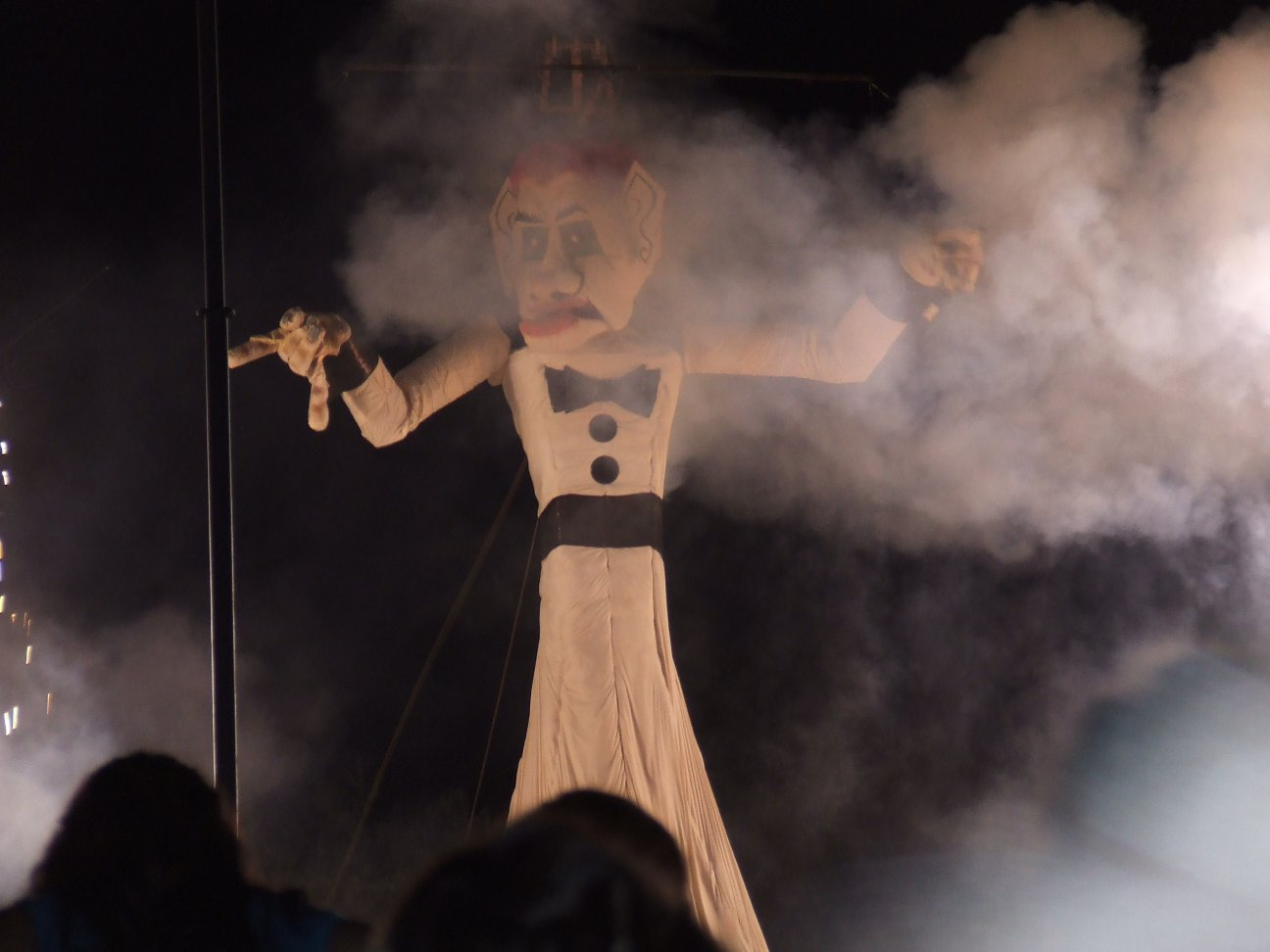
Smoke before the fire

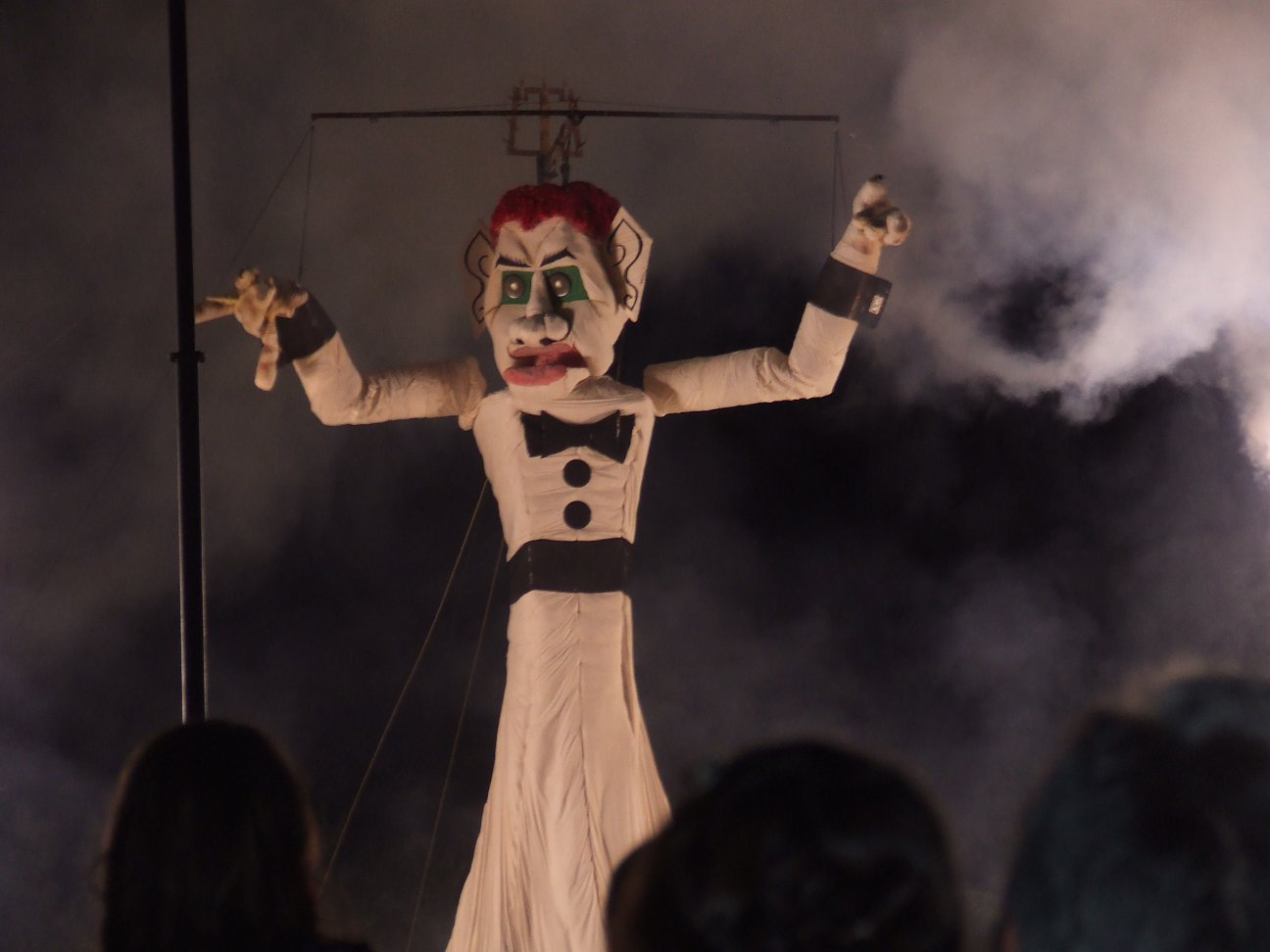
A moment of clarity before the burn

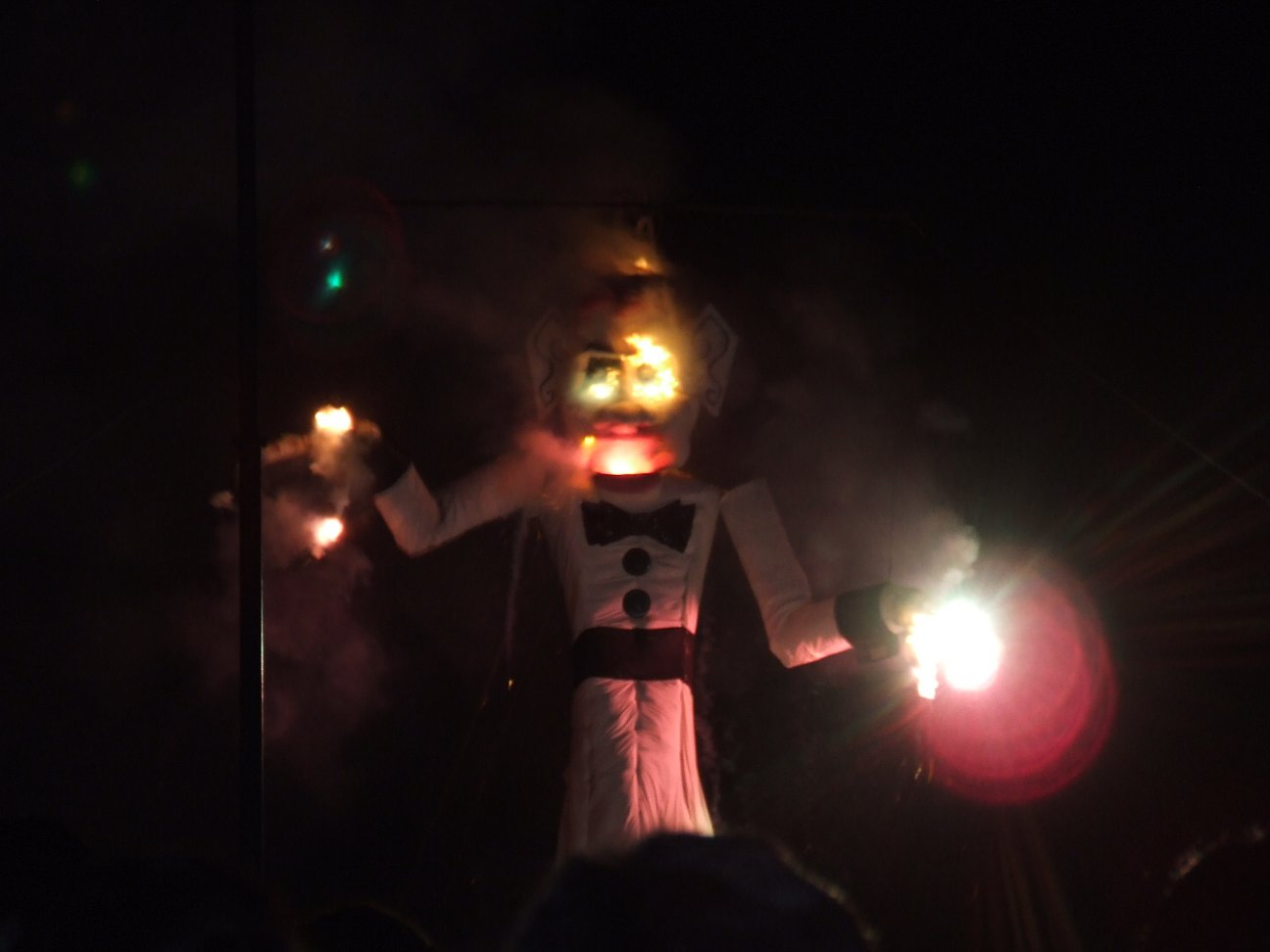
Zozobra burning
