= La Conquistadora =

Wooden statue of the Madonna and Child

Coordinates: 35°41′12″N 105°56′11″W

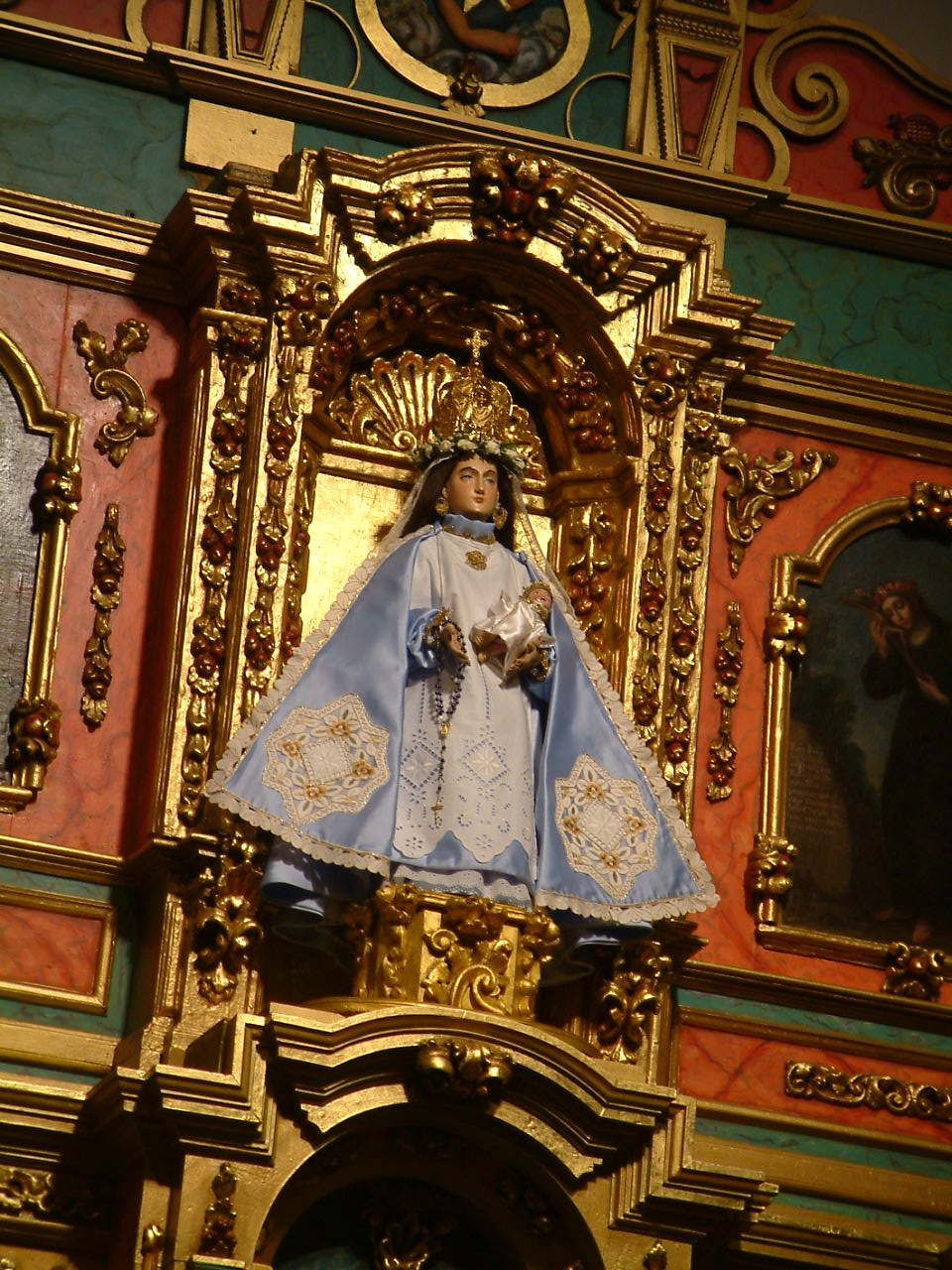
La Conquistadora, ca. 2007

La Conquistadora (Our Lady of the Conquest or Our Lady the Conqueror) is a small wooden statue of the Madonna and Child now in the Cathedral Basilica of St. Francis of Assisi in Santa Fe, New Mexico. She was the first Madonna brought to what is now the United States. The statuette is carved out of wood, and measures approximately three feet in height. A Catholic confraternity called, La Cofradía de La Conquistadora, exists to “promote devotion to the Mother of God under the title of La Conquistadora – Our Lady of Peace, and for the upkeep and maintenance of both of her chapels at the Cathedral Basilica of St. Francis of Assisi and the Rosario Chapel”. This confraternity is also responsible for maintaining the icon's chapel located in the north transept of the Basilica. The icon is dressed by the sacristana, or sacristan who maintains the vast wardrobe that includes clothing, veils, crowns, jewels and wigs. Cancer survivors often donate hair for use in fashioning wigs worn by the statue. The garments that the icon is clothed in are often sewn and donated by the faithful; all are rich in detail and very fine, often with elaborate designs. The estimate of her total outfits is close to 300. Even non-Catholics find occasion to honor the statue. For example, actress Ali MacGraw commissioned a piece that was displayed at Santa Fe's Spanish Colonial Museum in an exhibit about the icon mounted during 2010. The statue's origins are not well-known, but the 15th and 17th centuries are the most likely possibilities. Her arrival into America was made possible by the Spanish, who carried several versions of The Virgin Mary with them on their travels. There is a long history of armies carrying statues of saints into battle, for various purposes. Although the exact date of the statue's arrival in the New World is unknown, the Madonna was brought to New Mexico via Mexico City by priest Fray Alonso de Benavides, arriving in Santa Fe on January 25, 1626. Benavides wrote about this date in his journal, but the Archdiocese commonly uses the date of 1625. La Conquistadora was originally known as Our Lady of the Assumption.

Each new generation gave The Virgin a new title, with the current title being given to her by Don Diego de Vargas after he had reclaimed the area of Santa Fe 12 years after the Pueblo Revolt of 1680. He believed that La Conquistadora would help him in battle and offer assistance against the Native Americans who controlled the land. To give thanks to La Conquistadora, the Fiesta de Santa Fe is now held every August, in which she is carried in procession to Rosario Chapel and solemn masses are held in her honor (novena masses). Another title was given to the statue in 1992, when then-Archbishop Robert Sanchez bestowed her with the name Our Lady of Peace.

On 26 June 1960, the image is granted a canonical coronation by Pope John XXIII, presided over by Archbishop Egidio Vagnozzi, Apostolic Delegate to the country.

== Appearance ==
The statue of La Conquistadora is slightly less than three feet, at approximately 30 inches of height. She typically is adorned with a dark brown wig, which is often covered by a long veil. Sometimes the wig's length rivals her body's height. As she is a representation of the Virgin Mary, blue is frequently seen in her attire. The outfits that she has worn are numerous; records state that they are somewhere in the 300s. The color scheme of each outfit varies, but many are often blue and white with gold trimmings. She is sometimes adorned with a crown of gold, which possibly relates to the Assumption of the Madonna. As Mary passes on, she is taken to Heaven and given a golden crown for her position as queen of Heaven. Sometimes the statue holds a small figure of the infant Jesus Christ. Eskimo villagers in Holy Cross, Alaska, gifted the statue with an ermine cape.

== Origin ==
La Conquistadora's point of origin is still a topic of debate. Some scholars opine that her date of creation is unknown, but highly likely to be during the time of the Renaissance, which occurred from the 14th to 17th centuries. These scholars base this date on the fact that La Conquistadora holds a statue of an infant Jesus in her arms. They refer to the common depiction of the Maesta, also known as Madonna and Child, which was a popular subject for Renaissance artists to replicate and create, from Cimabue to Leonardo da Vinci. However, La Conquistadora does not always hold the infant, and the infant's provenance shows that it was made at a different time by a different carver, so the two statues may have been united by chance or circumstance. Sometimes La Conquistadora holds a rosary or an orb and cross. During Santa Fe's annual Indian Market each year, the statue is dressed with Native American attire, including a manta. Author Jaima Chevalier uncovered new information about the wood used to create the statue, and that information helps to pinpoint the time of origin using dendrochronology analysis from the University of Arizona. Chevalier's book on the topic reveals that church officials Fray Angelico Chavez and Pedro Ribera-Ortega were extremely instrumental in using modern techniques to date the wood used to make the statue. Further, Chevalier's book proves that the statue was made of two entirely different types of wood, making her provenance both mysterious and historically ambiguous.

== Journey to New Mexico ==
While the Americas were still in the process of being colonized, La Conquistadora was brought from Mexico City by Fray Alonso de Benavides to Santa Fe de Nuevo México. This is when she referred to as Nuestra Señora de La Asunción (Our Lady of the Assumption). Her role would be as a figure of comfort for new colonists. This role would be short-lived, however, once she would become the traveling companion of future governor Don Diego de Vargas. Renamed La Conquistadora, she was brought back from El Paso del Norte by de Vargas as he mounted a reconquest of New Mexico from the Pueblo peoples of the area. With carrying the statue on his travels, de Vargas hoped that the lands would be taken back in a relatively bloodless manner.

== Fiesta de Santa Fe ==
Following her return to Santa Fe in 1693, a festival was enacted to celebrate the reclamation of the state. This annual thanksgiving procession continues today as the oldest Marian festival in the United States. La Conquistadora is carried in a procession from the Cathedral to Rosario Chapel, where masses are then held. Once the novena masses are concluded, the statue is brought back and Fiesta de Santa Fe festivities begin. Parades and mariachis are a common occurrence at the Festival. The highlight of the Fiesta de Santa Fe is the burning of “Zozobra," also known as "Old Man Gloom"—an imposing 50 foot tall puppet that represents the problems and hardships of the previous year. Zozobra was designed by artist Will Shuster.

== Renaming ==
La Conquistadora was given a new name in 1992; then-Archbishop Robert Sanchez gave her the new title of Our Lady of Peace. The name change has been ascribed to the need to ameliorate the tensions between the Spanish and the original inhabitants of the New World. She is also invoked as Our Lady of Conquering Love, which captures the spirit of the original title La Conquistadora.

== Prayer ==
A Traditional Prayer to La Conquistadora

O Lady of Conquering Love, promised in Eden as the Woman whose Seed would crush the Serpent’s Head; help us to conquer evil in our midst and in our hearts, with the grace of your Son, Jesus Christ, Our God and Our Savior.

O Lady of Conquering Love, through your Motherhood of Our Savior, who is True God and True Man, help us overcome all errors regarding His Person and the Church that He founded for His Glory and our salvation.

O Lady of Conquering Love, through Jesus, who is the Prince of Peace and our Universal King, convert by His Divine Power, which is above all human might, the infidels and all the enemies of His Peace.

O Lady of Conquering Love, do conquer our hearts with your Immaculate loveliness, so that drawn from sinful ways to the precepts of your Son, we may glorify Him in this life, and, victoriously come to know him, with you and all the Saints, forever in the next.

Amen.
