= Roybal =

Galician surname

Roibal, also spelled Roybal and Ruibal, is a Galician surname, later introduced into the Americas. It has its origin in the hamlet of Ruibal, in the municipality of Moraña, Galicia, Spain where 3% of the inhabitants are surnamed Ruibal.

In Galicia, the surname is in use at least since the 14th century.

== History ==
In the Americas, the name first appears in documents dating to around 1675. One of the first recorded instances is that of Ignacio Roibal, a soldier who traveled with Don Diego de Vargas to reconquer the city of Santa Fe, New Mexico from the Native Americans after the Pueblo Revolt of 1680. Fray Angélico Chávez, a New Mexico historian, is also a descendant of the New Mexico Roibal lineage and was one of the first to trace it. Many Roibals (Roybals) trace their ancestry to the New Mexico cities of Santa Fe, Pojoaque, El Rancho, Jacona, to the San Ildefonso Pueblo, where it is shared by Native Americans, and to the historical area of Cuyumungue.

== Notable people with the last name Roybal ==
- Alfonso Roybal (also known as Awa Tsireh) (1898–1955), San Ildefonso Pueblo artist and painter
- Antonio Roybal (born 1976), American painter and sculptor
- Edward R. Roybal (1916–2005), American politician, Member of the U.S. House of Representatives from California
- Josefa Roybal, 20th-century Native American artist
- Lucille Roybal-Allard (born 1941), American politician
- Patricia Roybal Caballero (born 1949 or 1950), American politician from New Mexico

== Sources ==
- Motto, Sytha (1973). Old Houses of New Mexico and The People Who Built Them. Albuquerque: Calvin Horn Publisher, Inc. ISBN 0-910750-24-6.
- Chávez, Angélico (1974). My Penitente Land, Reflections on Spanish New Mexico. Albuquerque: University of New Mexico Press. p. 208. ISBN 0-8263-0334-X.
- "Roybal, Josefa". National Museum of American Art, Smithsonian. The Museum. 1995. pp. 183. ISBN 0-8212-2216-3.
