= Jason Garcia (artist) =

Native American artist

- Okuu Pin
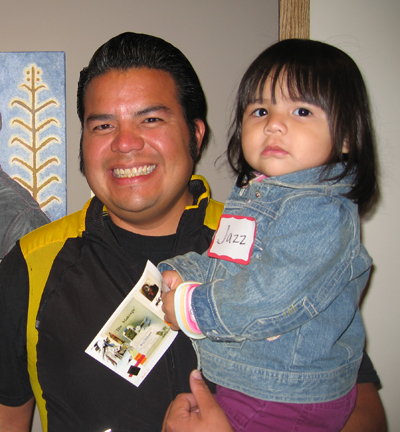
- Born: Kha'po Owingeh (Santa Clara Pueblo)
- Education: BFA, University of New Mexico, Albuquerque; MFA University of Wisconsin, Madison
- Known for: Contemporary art

Jason Garcia is a contemporary Native American artist in the United States, who was born in Santa Clara Pueblo, New Mexico. His work has been exhibited the Smithsonian in Washington D.C, the Heard Museum in Phoenix, the Palm Springs Art Museum, and many more. He won the 2018 Mentor Fellowship Award under the Native Arts and Cultures Foundation amongst many others.

He teaches many Native American children at summer programs and elementary schools about the art he creates and techniques he uses. Garcia documents the "ever-changing cultural landscape" of Santa Clara. He embodies traditional Pueblo techniques with contemporary imagery; combining native stories, ceremonies, and traditions with modern era constructions such as technology. His primary techniques are clay tiles and printmaking, including lithography, serigraphy, and etching.

== Early years ==
Jason Garcia, also known as Okuu Pin (Tewa: Oekuu Pʼin, transl. "turtle mountain" or Sandia Mountains) is from the Santa Clara Pueblo Tewa tribe. His name is representative of the Sandia Mountains that are located East of Albuquerque. The traditional Tewa name for Santa Clara is Khapo Owinge which means rose path.

Garcia grew up in an artistic environment, influencing his passion for art making. His paternal and maternal family members were well known pueblo potters, especially his grandmother, Gloria Garcia, also known as Goldenrod, for her works. His family would make pottery illustrating Pueblo traditions and ceremonies; as a kid, Garcia did not fully understand the imagery and art pieces. Therefore, he began to make artworks with imagery he was familiar with, such as, Star Wars, Spiderman, and Darth Vader; using the same traditional Pueblo techniques to create them. Garcia was influenced by painter Pablita Velarde.

Garcia documents the changes of the Pueblo through a contemporary lens by incorporating images such as television, cell phones, and social problems that are relevant to today's society. Garcia uses both traditional and modern materials and techniques in his artworks, with the intent of keeping Pueblo tradition alive while also connecting to future generations.

Garcia studied at the University of New Mexico, where he got his Bachelor's degree in Fine Arts in 1998. He recently completed his Masters of Fine Arts at the University of Wisconsin in 2016.

== Artworks ==
=== Warrior Maiden Muse (2019) ===
Part of the Tewa Tales of Suspense Series, this art piece shows the power of the Tewa culture and women on a clay tablet. It was displayed in March 2019 at the Ralph T. Coe Center for the Arts at their exhibition, Imprint. Garcia uses opaque mineral pigment colors and paints using the visuals of comic book art; he uses the pigments instead of Indian ink, which is typically used for comic books. This image on a clay tablet is meant to be and look like a comic book cover. Garcia's demonstration of this powerful woman goes in contrast to the stereotypes that are usually implemented on Native American women. The typical stereotype is that the man is the dominant one in the relationship and the females are very docile. Garcia shows the contrary of this and instead shows a hero of the Tewa people. He incorporates Tewa iconography through her clothing and images like the cloud above her head, clearly showing that they are on Tewa territory, and that she is there to protect them.

=== Pueblo Warriors Jar (2014) ===
Like much of Garcia's artwork, the Pueblo Warriors Jar continues to uphold Garcia's vision of using contemporary imagery and styles to present historical events. This art piece uses comic book iconography to depict Pueblo warriors and heroes that he often portrays in the comic-series, Tewa Tales of Suspense through screen prints and clay tiles. Garcia's inspiration for this was the 1680 Pueblo Revolt, which he constantly refers back to in many of his art pieces. In this specific piece, Garcia uses Marvel characters, Thor and Loki and puts them alongside historical Pueblo warrior heroes. Through this, Garcia is able to appeal to a larger audience, especially the youth. As well as help them understand their Pueblo culture with familiar iconography that they can relate to.

=== Tewa Tales of Suspense! ===
The Pueblo Revolt of 1680 is widely considered a historical event for the people of Santa Clara as it was a successful attempt in going against the European colonists. For over a decade following the revolt, there was no documented intrusion. Their independence was taken once again twelve years later in a period of time that featured fighting against the Spanish. Because of this, Garcia felt the need to tell this story to today's generations in ways that they can understand and relate to. In this series, Garcia shows important events of the Pueblo Revolt through comic book iconography and styles. The series consists of seven works. There are very few contemporary records and depictions of the Pueblo Revolt, thus Garcia's aspire to tell the Pueblo's perspectives on the story. Through this series, Garcia attempts to bring the rebellion back to life by bringing people's attention to this event of Native history. He does this through the use of vibrant colors and comic-book format, that presents a difficult time in American history in a "non-threatening manner," and using this, it allows the viewer to consider controversial aspects of our country's history.

== Exhibitions ==
- 2011 “11.11.11--First Year Graduate Show” Art Lofts Gallery, University of Wisconsin, Madison, WI
- 2011 “Counting Coup” Museum of Contemporary Native Art, Santa Fe, NM
- 2011 Soul Sister: Reimagining Kateri Tekakwitha- Museum of Contemporary Native Arts, Santa Fe, NM
- 2011 “Comic Art Indigene” Palm Springs Art Museum, Palm Springs, CA
- 2010 Transcending Traditions: Contemporary American Indian Artwork - Mesa Contemporary Arts, Mesa, AZ
- 2010 POP! Popular Culture in American Indian Art - Heard Museum, Phoenix, AZ
- 2008 Map(ing) Exhibition - Tempe Marketplace Night Gallery, Tempe, AZ
- 2007 Clay2 - Arizona State Museum, Tuson, AZ2006 Okuu Pin - The Art of Jason Garcia - Indian Pueblo Cultural Center, Albuquerque, NM
- 2006 COLOR - Elements of Earth & Fire - Museum of Indian Arts and Culture, Santa Fe, NM
- Indian Pueblo Cultural Center in Albuquerque (2006-2007)
- 2005 HOME - Native People in the Southwest - Heard Museum, Phoenix, AZ
- Comic Art Indigene: Smithsonian National Museum of the American Indian in Washington, DC
- Comic Art Indigene: Museum of Indian Arts and Culture in Santa Fe, New Mexico
- Native Pop!: New Mexico Museum of Art in Santa Fe, New Mexico
- Museum of Fine Arts in Santa Fe
- Heard Museum in Phoenix
- Featured in: Kim and Pat Messier’s Hopi & Pueblo Tiles
- Featured in: Steve Trimble’s 20th anniversary edition of Talking with the Clay: The Art of Pueblo Pottery in the 21st Century from SAR Press.

== Collections ==
- Albuquerque Museum | Albuquerque, NM
- Art Talks: Pueblo Warriors Jar by Jason Garcia Joins Rockwell Collection
- Crystal Bridges Museum of American Art, Bentonville, Arkansas
- King Galleries: Exceptional Pueblo Pottery and Native Art
- National Hispanic Cultural Center | Albuquerque, NM
- Nerman Museum of Contemporary Art | Overland Park, KS
- The Nelson-Atkins Museum of Art | Kansas City, MO
- Wheelright Museum of the American Indian | Santa Fe, NM
- Arizona State University | Tempe, AZ
- Buffalo Thunder Resort and Casino | Pojoaque Pueblo, NM
- Heard Museum | Phoenix, AZ
- National Museum of the American Indian | Washington DC
- Santa Clara Pueblo Day School | Santa Clara Pueblo, NM
- Poeh Cultural Museum | Pojoaque Pueblo, NM
- National Museum of American History | Washington DC

== Honors and awards ==
- 2024 Curatorial Research Fellow: First People's Fund
- 2018 Mentor Artist Fellowship
  - Where Garcia will mentor David Naranjo in the different printmaking techniques. Focusing on serigraphy-silkscreen printing. He will also teach Naranjo fine-art framing skills, exhibition preparation, and becoming involved in local art communities.
- 2017 Artist In Business Leadership Fellow: First Peoples Fund
- 2016 Artist In Residency: Institute of American Indian Arts
- 2016 Best of Classification and Best of Division Awards: SWAIA Santa Fe Indian Market
- 2016 Advanced Opportunity Fellow: University of Wisconsin
- 2015 Advanced Opportunity Fellow: University of Wisconsin
- 2012 American Indian Chancellors Fellow: University of Wisconsin
- 2012 Helen Cox Kersting Award: Eiteljorg Museum of American Indians and Western Art
- 2011 American Indian Chancellors Fellow: University of Wisconsin
- 2010 Judges Choice Award: Heard Museum Guild Indian Fair & Market
- 2009 Best of Classification and Best of Division Awards: SWAIA Santa Fe Indian Market
- 2008 Conrad House Award for Innovation: Heard Museum Guild Indian Fair & Market
- 2007 Ronald N. & Susan Dubin Fellow: School for Advanced Research
- 2007 Honorable Mention: Heard Museum Guild Indian Fair & Market
- 2006 Second Place and Third Place Awards: SWAIA Santa Fe Indian Market
- 2006 Best of Division Award
- 2006 Heard Museum Guild Indian Fair & Market
- 2004 Artists Choice Award
- 2003 Best of Division Award
- 2002 First Place in Class II, Division F at the SWAIA Indian Market in Santa Fe

== Publications ==
- Revolt: An Archaeological History of Pueblo Resistance and Revitalization in 17th Century New Mexico
- WHITE SHELL WATER PLACE: An Anthology of Native American Reflections on the 400th Anniversary of the Founding of Santa Fe
- "Without Reservation" art ltd. magazine. Scott Andrews, March 2010
- Talking with the Clay: The Art of Pueblo Pottery in the 21st Century. Stephen Trimble. SAR Press, 2007
- Hopi and Pueblo Tiles: An Illustrated History. Kim Messier and Pat Messier. Rio Nuevo Publishers, 2007
