= Statue of Diego de Vargas =

Statue formerly installed in Santa Fe, New Mexico, U.S.

Don Diego de Vargas Zapata Luján Ponce de León, El Marques de la Nava de Barcinas
- "de Vargas statue"
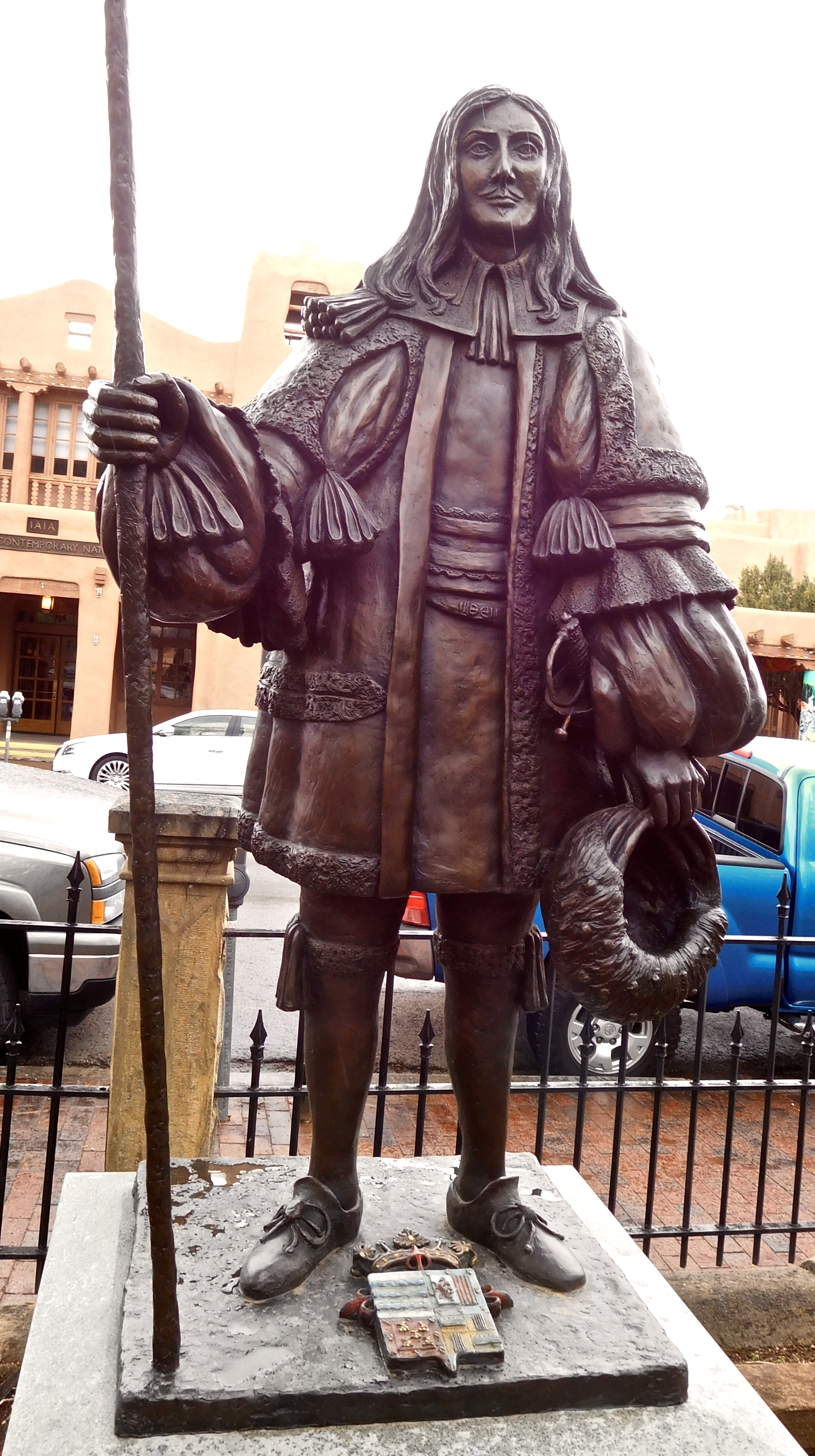
- The statue in 2016
- Subject: Diego de Vargas
- Location: Santa Fe, New Mexico, U.S.; 35.686939°N 105.935789°W until 2020

A statue of Diego de Vargas made by Donna Quasthoff was installed in 2007 at the west end of Santa Fe, New Mexico's Cathedral Park, in the United States. The statue was removed in June 2020 for conservation concerns, and is now on display at the New Mexico History Museum.

== Description ==
Based on a portrait painting residing in Spain, the full-length statue depicts de Vargas wearing fur-lined clothing, holding a spear in his right hand and his cap in the left. A saber is in a scabbard around his hips, and his coat of arms is shown at his feet.

== Controversy over storage and display ==
The statue was at the center of a controversy on where it has been stored and if it is being protected. In early February the statue was found in the backyard of a private residence home (which was not disclosed for privacy and safety concerns). The mayor and city manager had been told that the statue was in a city facility. This has led to concerns that the statue was at risk of damage or vandalism.

Although there is a four-year agreement for display of the work at the New Mexico History Museum (spanning 2024-2028), the statue's long-term fate is currently being determined. Supporters of removal see the statue as a celebration of Spanish colonization, while supporters of the statue say it is a celebration of Spain and Hispanic heritage. Former Santa Fe mayoral candidate Ronald Trujillo has expressed interest in the statue being donated back to the Caballeros de Vargas which would then display it on their own property. This request has been supported by multiple members of the city council. Councilman Chris Rivera stated, "I would be in favor of that, especially if we can't take care of it".

== See also ==
- List of monuments and memorials removed during the George Floyd protests
