= Luis Tupatu =

Luis Tupatu, also known as Luis Tupatú, was a Pueblo leader of the northern Pueblo during the period following the expulsion of the Spanish from New Mexico following the Pueblo Revolt. He was from Picuris Pueblo and took over the leadership position from Po'pay. Tupatú was also governor of thirteen villages of Northern New Mexico, negotiated a successful plan with governor of New Mexico Diego de Vargas to stop the fighting between Pecos Amerindians and Taos Amerindians and, in 1680, he led a rebellion of the Picuris Pueblo Indians, to whom also he ruled.

== Biography ==
Luis Tupatu was a member of the community of Puebloans, but he had some relatives of Spanish origin who had arrived to New Mexico as settlers. So his uncle Miguel Luján was one of the Captains of soldiers that accompanied Vargas in 1692. In addition, his wife belonged to a family formed by Tewas, Criollos Spaniards, and mestizos. He negotiated a plan with Diego de Vargas, governor of New Mexico at this time, to stop the fighting between Pecos Amerindians and Taos Amerindians. The business of peace was successful for both peoples because of the need to avoid further Amerindian attacks (prior to the plan to promote the peace, the Apache seriously attacked the Pueblos, and several clashes between the Pueblo tribes happened). So Tupatú was appreciated by Vargas and the Spanish government, already that he helped to preserve the peace in New Mexico. Later, in Santa Fe, Luis Tupatú was officially appointed governor of thirteen villages of Northern New Mexico. Thus, the month after his appointment, he earned a written title that symbolized his authority. In 1680, he led a rebellion of the Picuris Pueblo Indians, to whom also he ruled.
