= Fiestas de Santa Fe =

Festival held every autumn in Santa Fe, New Mexico, U.S.

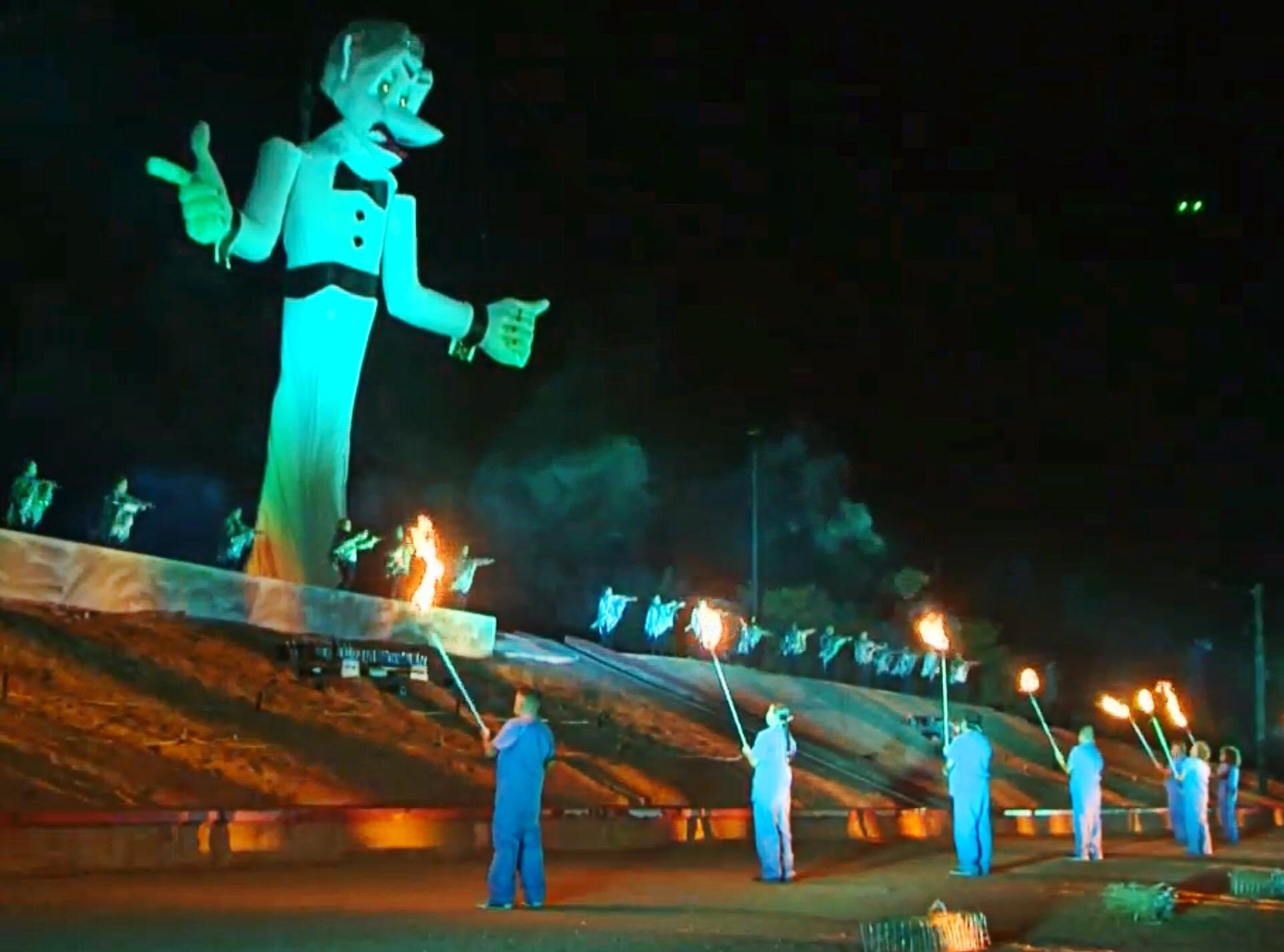
- Zozobra and fire dancers at the Santa Fe Fiesta
- Official name: Fiestas de Santa Fe; English translation: "Festival of Santa Fe"
- Also called: Santa Fe Fiesta
- Observed by: New Mexico
- Type: Local, Historical, Cultural, Religious
- Significance: First held on September 16, 1712, to commemorate Diego de Vargas' Bloodless reconquest of Santa Fe in Nuevo México
- Celebrations: The lighting of Zozobra, processions, parades, and New Mexico music performances (typically mariachi)
- Duration: 1 week
- Frequency: annual

Fiestas de Santa Fe is a festival held every autumn in Santa Fe, New Mexico, usually during the second week of September.

== History ==
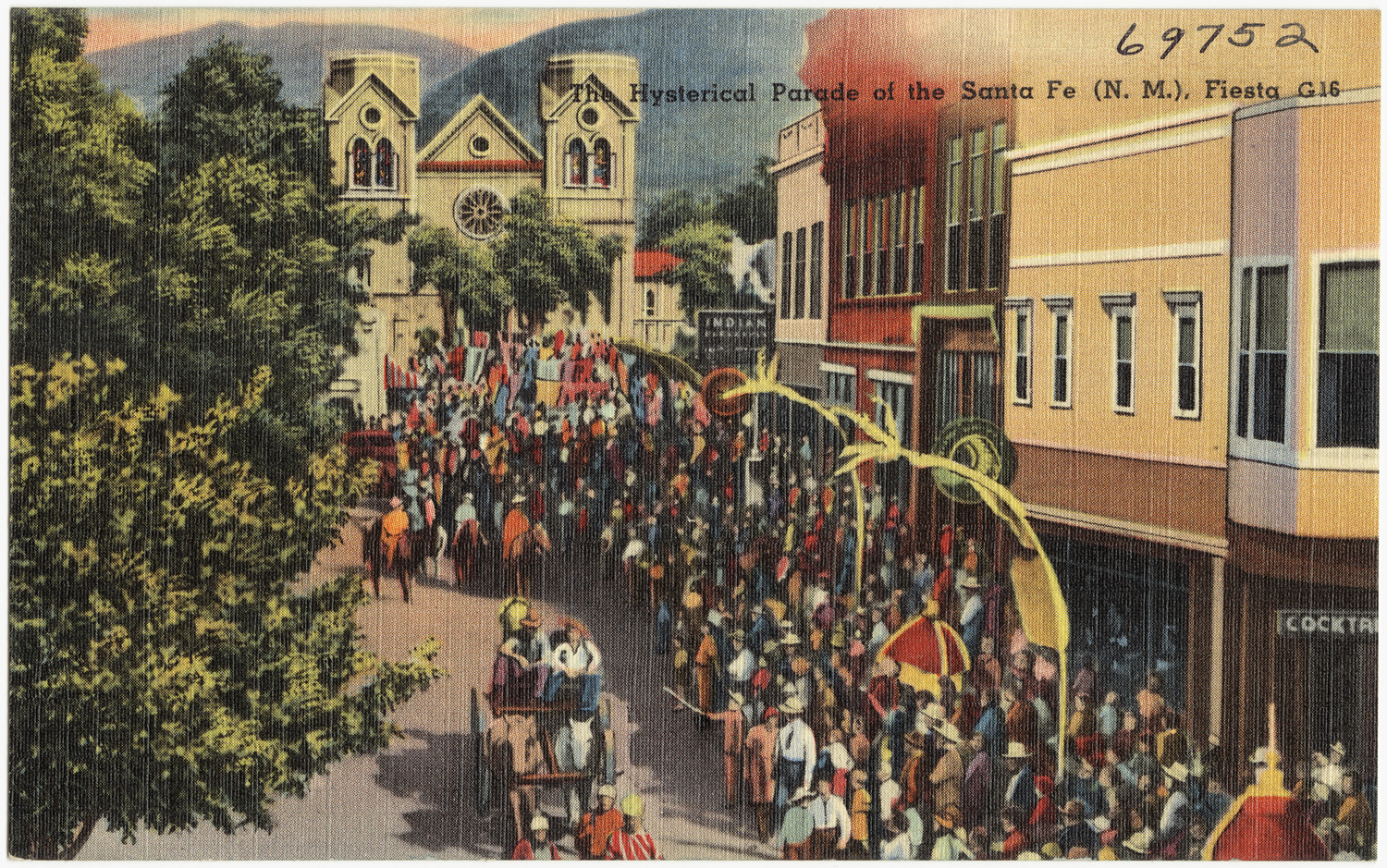
The Hysterical Pageant of the Fiesta c. 1930–1945

On September 16, 1712, the first Fiesta council signed a proclamation declaring there should be a celebration to commemorate the anniversary of the 1692 reconquest (recolonization) of New Mexico by General Don Diego de Vargas (1643–1704). The Spanish were earlier expelled from the city by neighboring Pueblo people during the Pueblo Revolt of 1680 and spent the next 12 years in exile in El Paso del Norte (now Ciudad Juárez, Mexico). The King of Spain appointed de Vargas to lead the exiled colonists in their reoccupation of Santa Fe by surrounding the city with cannons and threatening the Pueblo Indians residing inside with death. He re-entered the city on September 14, 1692; however the war for reoccupation of New Mexico raged on until 1694.

Fiesta was revamped in 1912 by a group led by the Santa Fe Chamber of Commerce and Edgar Lee Hewett. Hewett re-envisioned the Fiesta as a celebration of the history of New Mexico from prehistoric times to the annexation by the United States and rooted in the culture of the Native Americans, Hispanos and Anglos. During the twentieth century the event became increasingly commercialized. From 1925 to 1932 the Spanish Colonial Arts Society sold santos during the Fiesta, an event that spun off as its own celebration called Spanish Market. In protest to Hewett's charging of admission to the Fiesta, a group of artists and writers decide to stage their own admission-free Fiesta called "El Pasatiempo" in 1926. "El Pasatiempo" featured a Hysterical Pageant, a parody of the Fiesta historical pageant, and the burning of Zozobra, both of which later became part of the Fiesta celebration.

No celebrations were held in 1917–18 during that reinvisioning, and during World War II in 1942–45.

The Fiesta was again revamped following criticism of its portrayal of The Entrada. In 1977 the All Indian Pueblo Council and the state's Eight Northern Pueblos staged a boycott when a former Fiesta Council president sent a letter to the Pueblos requesting they not sell their wares during Fiesta. The Fiesta Council responded to these criticisms by emphasizing peaceful co-existence of the indigenous and Hispanic communities and their shared Catholic faith. From 2015 to 2017, silent protestors raised placards citing historical facts at odds with the narrative annually given when the re-enactors reached Santa Fe's historic Plaza to portray the retaking of the city. Extensive press coverage was key to changing The Entrada aspect of the fiesta. In addition, many local screenings of the documentary film Veiled Lightning, including two screenings at Santa Fe's New Mexico History Museum. In 2018 the Entrada was dropped from Santa Fe's Fiesta celebration.

The COVID-19 pandemic prevented a public event in 2020, but they did stream some events including the burning of Zozobra. A similar streamed event occurred in 2021.

In 2016, Al Hurricane Jr. had released a song titled "La Fiesta de Santa Fe". During the first full Fiesta since the pandemic, held in 2022, the bandstand featured him, and other New Mexico music performances; by musicians including Sangre Joven, Divino, The Dwyane Ortega Band, and dances from Indigenous Pueblo Dancers, Los Matachines de Bernalillo, and Popé's Dancers.

== Fiesta highlights ==
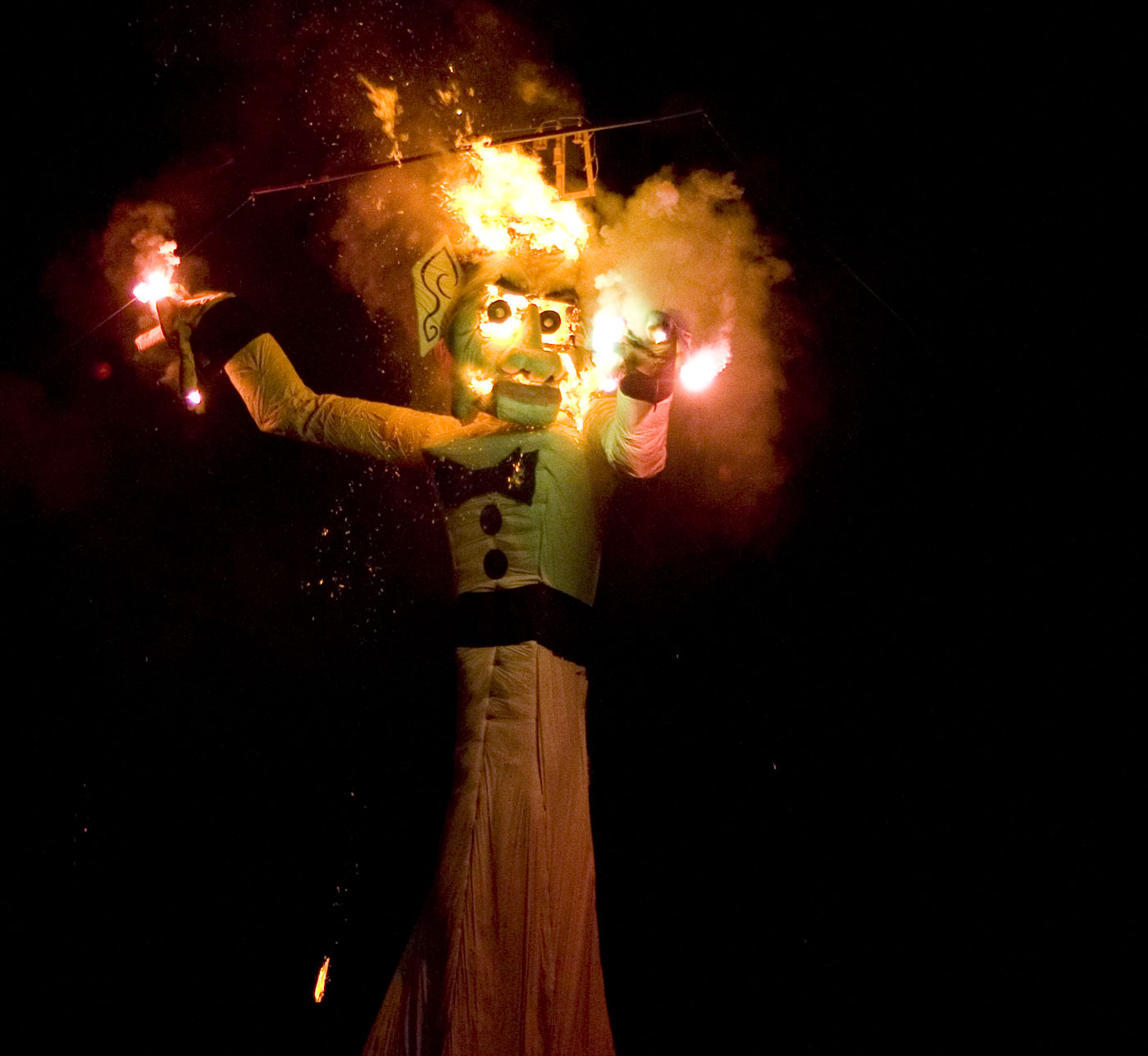
The burning of Zozobra at fiesta

The start of Fiestas is marked by the beginning of the Novena masses, which start during the Knighting and Coronation of Don Diego de Vargas and La Reina de Santa Fe in which a procession which takes La Conquistadora from the Cathedral Basilica to the Rosario Chapel, at Rosario Cemetery in Santa Fe. From there 9 masses are held throughout the week and at the end of the week La Conquistadora is returned from Rosario Chapel to the Cathedral Basilica that following weekend. Those masses are carried out and are made as a tribute to the promise that Don Diego de Vargas made to La Conquistadora, and is carried through until September which includes the burning of Zozobra, also known as "Old Man Gloom", a 50 ft/15.2m tall marionette that symbolizes the hardships and despair of the past year. This is followed by 3 days of celebration that includes a reenactment of Don Diego de Vargas's return to the city, a children's pet parade, the Historical/Hysterical Parade, the Fiesta Ball and Roman Catholic masses of thanksgiving. During the festival, the Santa Fe Plaza is filled with arts & crafts and food booths, and mariachis play throughout the city. Fiestas concludes with mass at the St. Francis Cathedral followed by a candlelight procession to the Cross of the Martyrs.
