= Duns Scotus College =

Southfield, Michigan, USA, 1930–1979

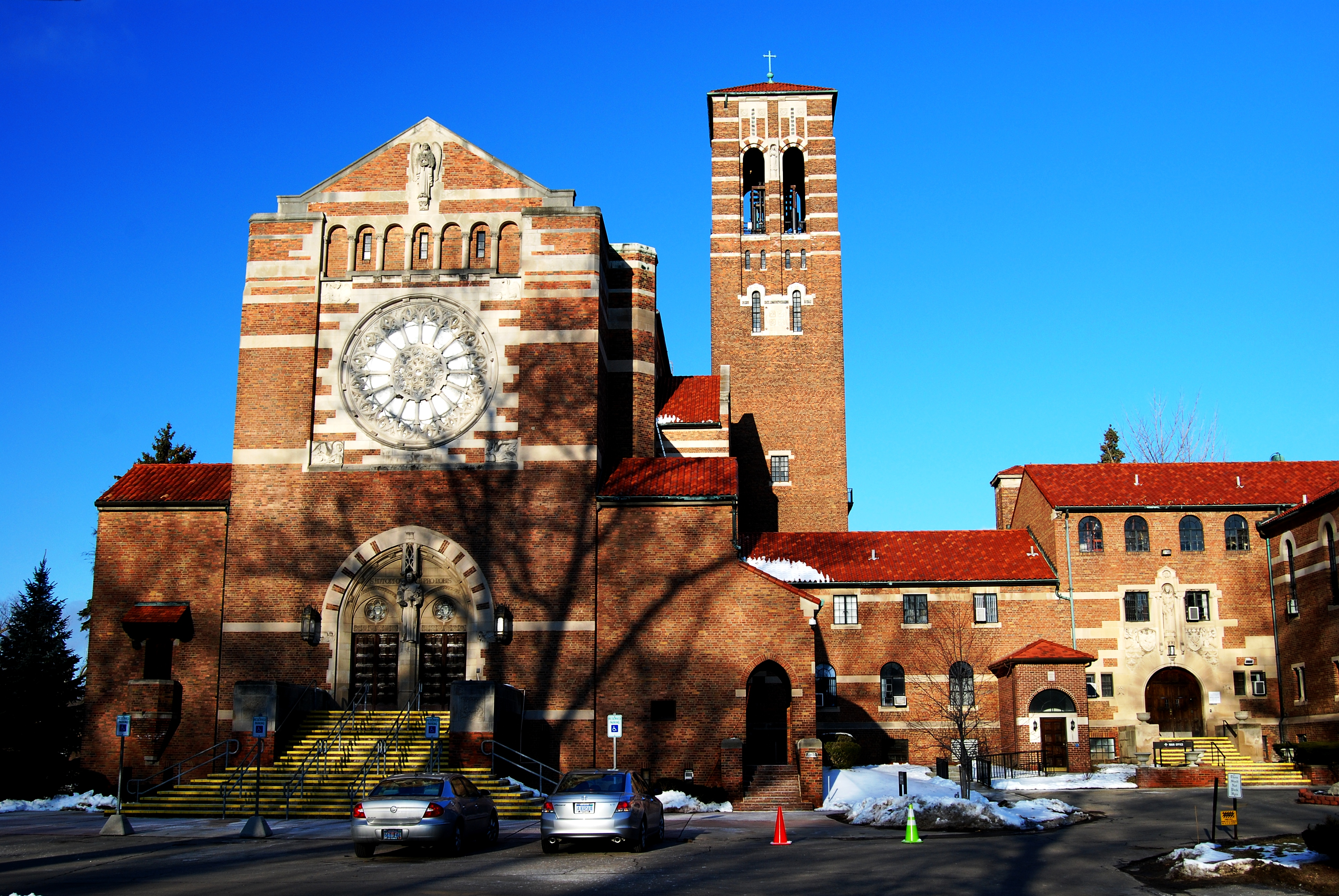
The former Duns Scotus College, once a Franciscan monastery in Southfield, is now the non-denominational Word of Faith.

Duns Scotus College was a private college of the Friars Minor in Southfield, Michigan, United States, from 1930 until 1979. It was first regularly accredited in 1969.

It was founded when the Friars decided their previous three-seminary set up in Kentucky and Ohio was too unwieldy. In 1928 ground was broken for the college at the corner of Nine Mile Road and Evergreen Road in Southfield. It was designed by Wilfrid B. Anthony.

After closing, the college became Word of Faith Christian Center, led by Keith Butler.

== See also ==
- Duns Scotus
