= Zozobra (emotion) =

Form of existential anxiety

Zozobra is a Spanish word for distress. The Mexican philosopher Emilio Uranga used the term to describe a specific form of existential anxiety related to uncertainty and ambiguity, following its usage by the poet Ramón López Velarde.

The term has been used to describe the feelings of uncertainty and distress in the United States due to the confluence of the COVID-19 pandemic and the political events of the Trump presidency and 2020 U.S. presidential election.
