= Diego de Vargas =

Spanish governor of New Mexico

Diego de Vargas Zapata y Luján Ponce de León y Contreras
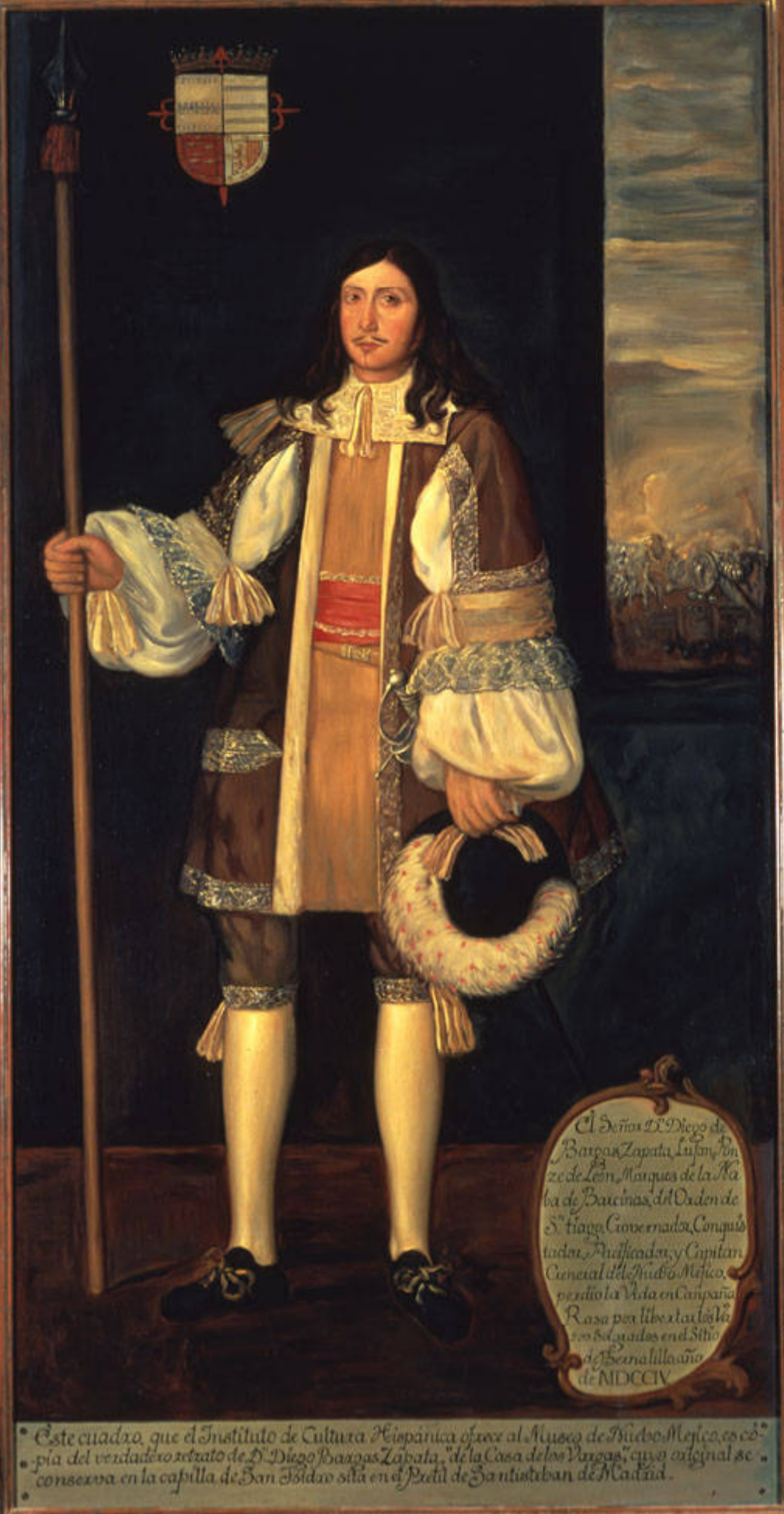
- Oil on canvas portrait of Diego de Vargas by Julio Barrera, date unknown, from the collection of the Palace of the Governors

30 and 32nd Spanish Governor of New Mexico
- In office 1691 – 1697 (as effective) (titular 1688–91)
- Preceded by: Luis Tupatu (Pueblo republic); Domingo Jironza Petriz de Cruzate (in exile)
- Succeeded by: Pedro Rodríguez Cubero
- In office 1697–1703
- Preceded by: Pedro Rodríguez Cubero
- Succeeded by: Juan Páez Hurtado

Personal details
- Born: 1643 Madrid, Spain
- Died: 1704 (aged 60–61) Bernalillo, Nuevo México (New Mexico)
- Profession: Political and military
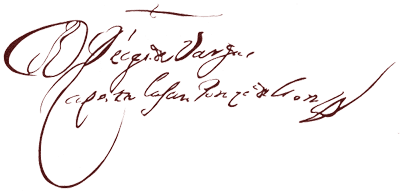
- Signature

Diego de Vargas Zapata y Luján Ponce de León y Contreras (1643–1704), commonly known as Don Diego de Vargas, was a conquistador and Spanish Governor of the New Spain territory of Santa Fe de Nuevo México (currently covering the modern US states of New Mexico and Arizona). He was the title-holder in 1690–1695, and effective governor in 1692–1696 and 1703–1704. He is known for leading the reconquest of the territory in 1692 following the Pueblo Revolt of 1680. This reconquest is commemorated annually during the Fiestas de Santa Fe in the city of Santa Fe.

== Pueblo revolt and reconquest ==
On 10 August 1680, Pueblo people from various pueblos in northern New Mexico staged an uprising against Spanish colonists. They laid siege to the city of Santa Fe, forcing the colonists to retreat on 20 August. The Spanish colonists fled south to El Paso del Norte (now Ciudad Juárez, Mexico), where they remained in exile for the next 16 years.

Po'pay was replaced by Luis Tupatu as leader of the Pueblo republic around 1683. That year Tupatu sent an emissary Juan Punsilli of Picuris to negotiate peace and invite the Spanish to return to New Mexico if they did so peacefully, without killing people or burning homes. Po'pay died, probably in 1688, with the united Pueblo state he envisioned divided and weak.

In 1688, Capitan General y Governador Don Diego de Vargas was appointed Spanish Governor of New Mexico, though he did not arrive to assume his duties until 22 February 1691. He was assigned with the task of reconquering and pacifying the New Mexico territory for Spain. In July 1692, de Vargas and a small contingent of soldiers returned to Santa Fe. They surrounded the city and called on the Pueblo people to surrender, promising clemency if they would swear allegiance to the King of Spain (at the time, Charles II of Spain) and return to the Christian faith. After meeting with de Vargas, the Pueblo leaders agreed to surrender, and on 12 September 1692 de Vargas proclaimed a formal act of repossession. De Vargas’ repossession of New Mexico is often called a bloodless reconquest, since the territory was initially retaken without any use of force. However, according to historian Enrique Lamadrid, once Spanish law was reestablished in the region by 1693, 70 participants in the revolt were executed on the Santa Fe Plaza.

In 1692, Governor Diego de Vargas, with an army of 150 Spanish soldiers and pro-Spanish Pueblo warriors, attempted reconquest. Vargas promised pardon rather than punishment and most of the Pueblos gradually acceded to Spanish rule although violent opposition to Spanish rule continued for several years. Only the distant Hopi, living in what is today Arizona, retained their independence although many Pueblos also took up residence among the Navajo and Apaches.

Luis Tupatu negotiated a plan with Diego de Vargas, governor of New Mexico at this time, to stop the fighting between Pecos people and Taos Pueblo. The business of peace was successful for both peoples because of the need to avoid further attacks (prior to the plan to promote the peace, the Apache seriously attacked the Pueblos, and several clashes between the Pueblo tribes happened). So Tupatú was appreciated by Vargas and the Spanish government, already that he helped to preserve the peace in New Mexico. Later, in Santa Fe, Luis Tupatú was officially appointed governor of thirteen villages of Northern New Mexico. Thus, the month after his appointment, he earned a written title that symbolized his authority.

The Spanish return to New Mexico was prompted by their fears of French advances into the Mississippi valley and their desire to create a defensive frontier against the increasingly aggressive nomadic tribes on their northern borders. In August 1692, de Vargas marched to Santa Fe unopposed along with a converted Zia war captain, Bartolomé de Ojeda. De Vargas, with only sixty soldiers, one hundred Indian auxiliaries or native soldiers, seven cannons (which he used as leverage against the Pueblo inside Santa Fe), and one Franciscan priest, arrived at Santa Fe on September 13. He promised the 1,000 Pueblo people assembled there clemency and protection if they would swear allegiance to the King of Spain and return to the Christian faith. After a while the Pueblo rejected the Spaniards. After much persuading, the Spanish finally made the Pueblo agree to peace. On September 14, 1692, de Vargas proclaimed a formal act of repossession. It was the thirteenth town he had reconquered for God and King in this manner, he wrote jubilantly to the Conde de Galve, viceroy of New Spain. During the next month de Vargas visited other Pueblos and accepted their acquiescence to Spanish rule.

Though the 1692 agreement to peace was bloodless, in the years that followed de Vargas maintained increasingly severe control over the increasingly defiant Pueblo. De Vargas returned to Mexico and gathered together about 800 people, including 100 soldiers, and returned to Santa Fe on December 16, 1693. This time, however, 70 Pueblo warriors and 400 family members within the town opposed his entry. De Vargas and his forces staged a quick and bloody recapture that concluded with the surrender and execution of the 70 Pueblo warriors on December 30, and their surviving families (about 400 women and children) were sentenced to ten years' servitude and distributed to the Spanish colonists as slaves.

== Second Pueblo Revolt ==
In 1696 the residents of fourteen pueblos attempted a second organized revolt, launched with the murders of five missionaries and thirty-four settlers and using weapons the Spanish themselves had traded to the natives over the years; de Vargas's retribution was unmerciful, thorough and prolonged. By the end of the century the last resisting Pueblo town had surrendered and the Spanish reconquest was essentially complete. Many of the Pueblos, however, fled New Mexico to join the Apache or Navajo or to attempt to re-settle on the Great Plains. After the Pueblos were defeated, the Picuris—under the leadership of Luis Tupatu—joined their longtime allies, the Jicarilla Apaches, in El Cuartolejo, which is now in western Kansas and lies east of Pueblo, Colorado.

While the independence of many pueblos from the Spaniards was short-lived, the Pueblo Revolt gained the Pueblo people a measure of freedom from future Spanish efforts to eradicate their culture and religion following the reconquest. Moreover, the Spanish issued substantial land grants to each Pueblo and appointed a public defender to protect the rights of the Native Americans and argue their legal cases in the Spanish courts. The Franciscan priests returning to New Mexico did not again attempt to impose a theocracy on the Pueblo who continued to practice their traditional religion.

== Modern legacy ==
De Vargas had prayed to the Virgin Mary, under her title La Conquistadora (Our Lady of Conquering Love), for the peaceful re-entry. Believing that she heard his prayer, he celebrated a feast in her honor. Today, this feast continues to be celebrated annually in Santa Fe as the Fiestas de Santa Fe. Part of those annual fiestas is a novena of masses in thanksgiving. Those masses are also done with processions from the Cathedral Basilica of St. Francis of Assisi to the Rosario Chapel. The actual statue of La Conquistadora is taken in the processions. After the novena is completed she is taken back to the Basilica. This event includes participation by local tribes as well as Latino descendants that reside in the area. In the second decade of the 21st century, members of Native American tribes and pueblos protested the pageant, recalling the subsequent retaking of Santa Fe.

The focus of these protests was The Entrada—a reenactment of de Vargas's re-entry into Santa Fe that has long been seen as inaccurate by historians and culturally offensive by Native Americans. The most recent round of protests against The Entrada started in 2015. That year, silent protestors raised placards citing historical facts at odds with the narrative present when the re-enactors reached Santa Fe's historic Plaza to portray the retaking of the city. Protests in 2017 resulted in 8 arrests; though the charges were later dismissed. Following the protests and months of negotiation the Entrada was removed from The Santa Fe Fiesta celebration.

On June 18, 2020 the city of Santa Fe, New Mexico removed a statue of Diego de Vargas, later restoring it to display at the New Mexico History Museum. The statue was one of several removed as wider efforts to remove controversial statues across the United States.

== Personal life ==
Like many wealthy citizens of the Spanish Empire at the time, de Vargas owned slaves. He manumitted his coachman Ignacio de la Cruz, but his wife Josefa de la Cruz (purchased in Mexico City in 1703 at age 20 for 300 reales de vellon) was part of the property of de Vargas' estate conveyed to other owners after his death. This is known from contemporary legal documents later collected by William Gillet Ritch.

== Regiment of de Vargas ==
- Ignacio Roibal (Roybal) – Owner of the now-historic Sena Plaza in Santa Fe.
- Alonso Rael de Aguilar – Secretary of Government and War for de Vargas
- Juan de Ulibarrí – soldier and explorer of the Great Plains
- Captain Don Fernando Durán y Chaves (b. 1651, d. Bet. 1712 - 1716) (Note: For more detailed treatment see "El Palacio", Vol. 55, No. 4, pp. 103-121.Some emendations in this present work -"Origins of New Mexico Families" are the result of more data found.)

== See also ==
- History of New Mexico
