= Pueblo Revolt =

Pueblo people expel Spanish colonists (1680)

- Part of Spanish colonization of the Americas
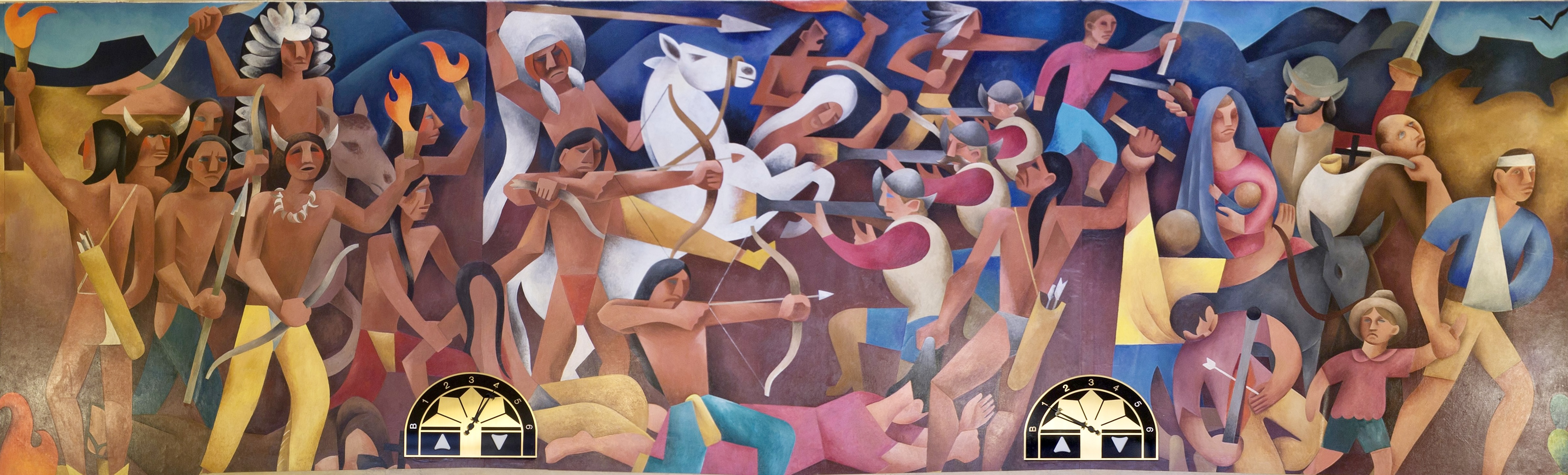
- Pueblo Rebellion, Loren Mozley (1936)
Date	August 10–21, 1680
Location	Santa Fe de Nuevo México, New Spain
Result	Pueblo victory, expulsion of Spanish settlers and end of Spanish rule for about 12 years.

Belligerents
Spanish Empire: New Spain	Puebloans: Taos; Picuris; Jemez; Kha'p'oo Owinge; Kewa; Tesuque; Ohkay Owingeh; Nambé

Commanders and leaders
Antonio de Otermín	Popé; See list below for others

Casualties and losses
400, including civilians and 21 Franciscan Friars	Over 600

The Pueblo Revolt of 1680, also known as Popé's Rebellion or Po'pay's Rebellion, was an uprising of the Indigenous Pueblo people against the Spanish colonists in the province of Santa Fe de Nuevo México, a historic province including modern-day New Mexico and surrounding areas of the United States. Persistent Spanish policies, coupled with incidents of brutality and cruelty such as those that occurred in 1599 and resulted in the Ácoma Massacre, stoked animosity and gave rise to the eventual Revolt of 1680. Of the primers to this event, the most inflammatory was the persecution and mistreatment of Pueblo people who practiced native religions. Scholars consider it the first Native American religious traditionalist revitalization movement. The Spaniards were resolved to abolish pagan forms of worship and replace them with Christianity. The Pueblo Revolt killed 400 Spaniards and allowed the remaining 2,000 settlers to flee out of the province. The Spaniards returned to New Mexico twelve years later.

== Background ==
For more than 100 years beginning in 1540, the Pueblo people of present-day New Mexico were subjected to successive waves of soldiers, missionaries, and settlers. These encounters, referred to as entradas (incursions), were characterized by violent confrontations between Spanish colonists and Pueblo peoples. The Tiguex War, fought in the winter of 1540–41 by the expedition of Francisco Vázquez de Coronado against the twelve or thirteen pueblos of Tiwa Native Americans, was particularly destructive to Pueblo and Spanish relations.

In 1598, Juan de Oñate led 129 soldiers and 10 Franciscan priests, plus a large number of women, children, servants, slaves, and livestock, into the Rio Grande valley of New Mexico. There were at the time approximately 40,000 Pueblo Native Americans inhabiting the region. Oñate put down a revolt at Acoma Pueblo by killing and enslaving hundreds of the Native Americans and sentencing all men 25 or older to have a foot cut off. A troop of seventy soldiers was dispatched to the cliff-top Pueblo of Acoma in 1599 to punish the Pueblo for the killing of twelve Spanish soldiers by a band of warriors. After two days of warfare, almost 600 Acoma men, women, and children were seized and enslaved, with many being legally convicted and disfigured as punishment for crimes against the Spanish Crown. The survivors fled as the Pueblo was destroyed by fire. The harshness with which the Acomas were punished left an unforgettable sense of Spanish cruelty. The Ácoma Massacre would instill fear of and anger at the Spanish in the region for years to come. Franciscan missionaries were assigned to several of the Pueblo towns to Christianize the natives.

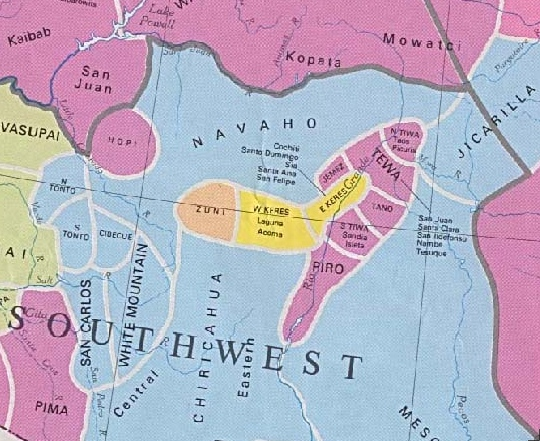
The location of the Pueblo villages and their neighbors in early New Mexico.

Spanish colonial policies in the 1500s regarding the humane treatment of native citizens were often ignored on the northern frontier. With the establishment of the first permanent colonial settlement in 1598, the Pueblos were forced to provide tribute to the colonists in the form of labor in corn plantations and textile mills. Encomiendas were soon established by colonists along the Rio Grande, restricting Pueblo access to fertile farmlands and water supplies and placing a heavy burden upon Pueblo labor. Especially egregious to the Pueblo was the assault on their traditional religion. Franciscan priests established theocracies in many of the Pueblo villages. In 1608, when it looked as though Spain might abandon the province, the Franciscans baptized seven thousand Pueblos to try to convince the Crown otherwise. Although the Franciscans initially tolerated manifestations of the old religion as long as the Puebloans attended mass and maintained a public veneer of Catholicism, Fray Alonso de Posada (in New Mexico 1656–1665) outlawed Kachina dances by the Pueblo people and ordered the missionaries to seize and burn their masks, prayer sticks, and effigies. The Franciscan missionaries also forbade the use of entheogenic substances in the traditional religious ceremonies of the Pueblo. Some Spanish officials, such as Nicolás de Aguilar, who attempted to curb the power of the Franciscans were charged with heresy and tried before the Inquisition. The Pueblos by and large resented the missionaries, with the Hopis in particular referring to Spanish priests as tūtáachi, "dictator and demanding person."

In the 1670s drought swept the region, causing a famine among the Pueblo and increased raids by the Apache, which Spanish and Pueblo soldiers were unable to prevent. Fray Alonso de Benavides wrote multiple letters to the King, describing the conditions, noting "the Spanish inhabitants and Indians alike eat hides and straps of carts". The unrest among the Pueblos came to a head in 1675. Governor Juan Francisco Treviño ordered the arrest of forty-seven Pueblo medicine men and accused them of practicing "sorcery". Four medicine men were sentenced to death by hanging; three of those sentences were carried out, while the fourth prisoner committed suicide. The remaining men were publicly whipped and sentenced to prison. When this news reached the Pueblo leaders, they moved in force to Santa Fe, where the prisoners were held. Because a large number of Spanish soldiers were away fighting the Apache, Governor Treviño was forced to accede to the Pueblo demand for the release of the prisoners. Among those released was a San Juan ("Ohkay Owingeh" in the Tewa Language) native named "Popé". Po'pay's imprisonment and release five years before the Revolt led to his role in planning and orchestrating the events of 1680. Po'pay was considered a credible and respected provocateur by two dozen communities speaking six different languages and spread over a nearly 400-mile radius from Taos to the Hopi villages.

== Rebellion ==
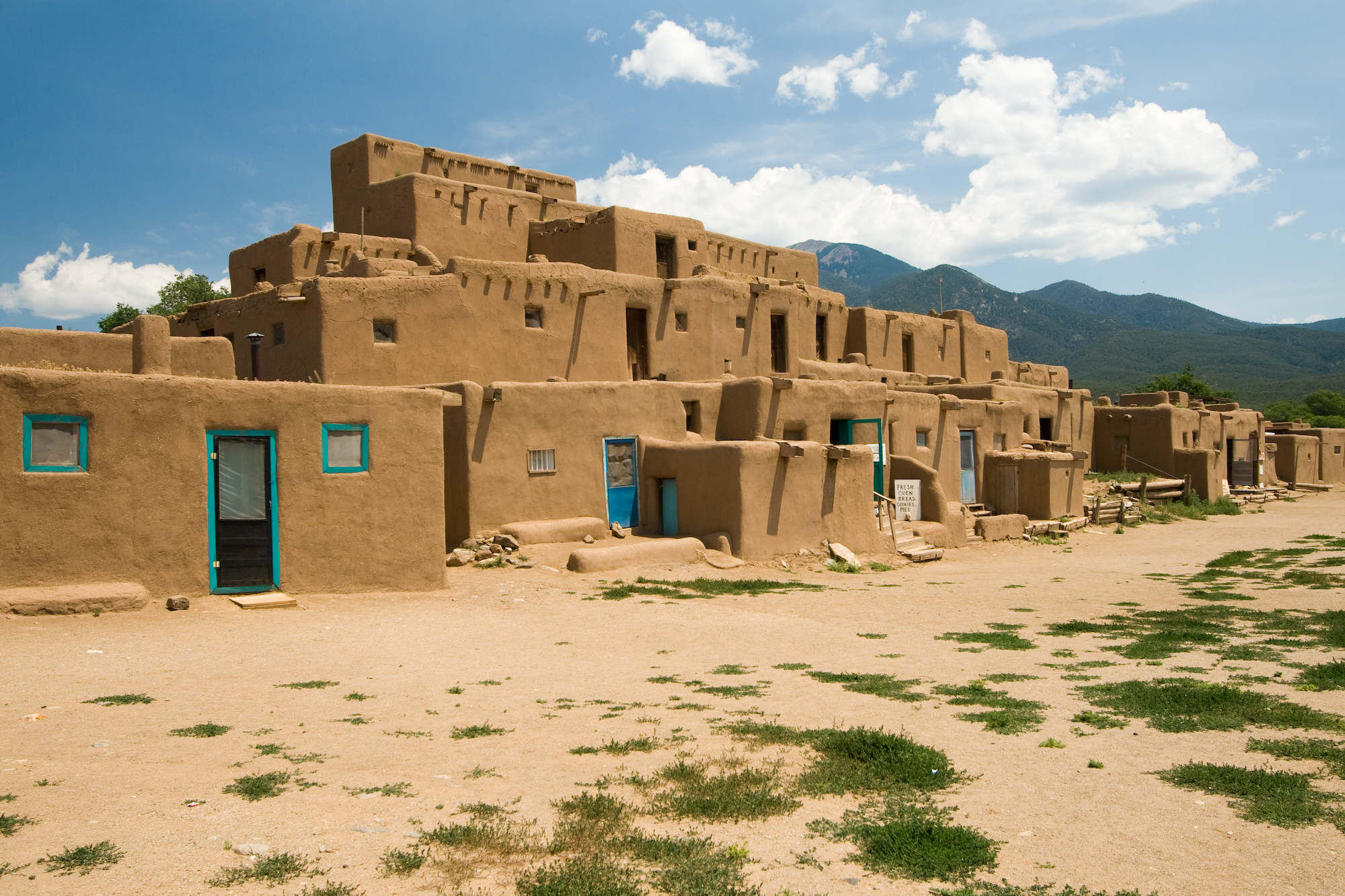
Taos Pueblo, Popé's base during the revolt

Following his release, Popé, along with a number of other Pueblo leaders (see list below), planned and orchestrated the Pueblo Revolt. Popé took up residence in Taos Pueblo, about 70 miles north of the capital of Santa Fe, and spent the next five years seeking support for a revolt among the 46 Pueblo towns. He gained the support of the Northern Tiwa, Tewa, Towa, Tano, and Keres-speaking Pueblos of the Rio Grande Valley. Because of the language barrier separating the six tribes, the revolt utilized Spanish as the unofficial lingua franca. The Pecos Pueblo, 50 miles east of the Rio Grande pledged its participation in the revolt as did the Zuni and Hopi, 120 and 200 miles respectively west of the Rio Grande. The Pueblos not joining the revolt were the four southern Tiwa (Tiguex) towns near Santa Fe and the Piro Pueblos south of the principal Pueblo population centers near the present day city of Socorro. The southern Tiwa and the Piro were more thoroughly integrated into Spanish culture than the other groups. The Spanish population of about 2,400, of which a plurality were mixed-blood mestizos, along with native servants and retainers, was scattered thinly throughout the region. Santa Fe was the only place that approximated being a town. The Spanish could only muster 170 men with arms. The Pueblos joining the revolt probably had 2,000 or more adult men capable of using native weapons such as the bow and arrow. It is possible that some Apache and Navajo participated in the revolt. The Pueblo revolt was typical of millenarian movements in colonial societies. Popé promised that, once the Spanish were killed or expelled, the ancient Pueblo gods would reward them with health and prosperity. Popé's plan was that the inhabitants of each Pueblo would rise up and kill the Spanish in their area and then all would advance on Santa Fe to kill or expel all the remaining Spanish. The date set for the uprising was August 11, 1680. Popé dispatched runners to all the Pueblos carrying knotted cords. Pedro Omtua and Nicolas Catua were the two young men. On August 8, 1680, two young men from Tesuque set out for Tanogeh (Tano villages) early in the morning. Their first contact occurred in Pecos. Unfortunately, Fray Fernandao De Velasco was informed right away by Christian Indians that two Tewa young men had visited the war chief's house. After leaving Pecos, the two Tesuque runners continued on to Galisteo, San Cristobal, and San Marcos.

Each morning the Pueblo leadership was to untie one knot from the cord, and when the last knot was untied, that would be the signal for them to rise against the Spaniards in unison. On August 9, however, the Spaniards were warned of the impending revolt by southern Tiwa leaders and they captured two Tesuque Pueblo youths entrusted with carrying the message to the pueblos. They were tortured to make them reveal the significance of the knotted cord.

Popé then ordered the revolt to begin a day early. The Hopi pueblos located on the remote Hopi Mesas of Arizona did not receive the advanced notice for the beginning of the revolt and followed the schedule for the revolt. On August 10, the Puebloans rose up, stole the Spaniards' horses to prevent them from fleeing, sealed off roads leading to Santa Fe, and pillaged Spanish settlements. A total of 400 people were killed, including men, women, children, and 21 of the 33 Franciscan missionaries in New Mexico. In the rebellion at Tusayan (Hopi) churches at Awatovi, Shungopavi, and Oraibi were destroyed and the attending priests were killed. Survivors fled to Santa Fe and Isleta Pueblo, 10 miles south of Albuquerque and one of the Pueblos that did not participate in the rebellion. By August 13, all the Spanish settlements in New Mexico had been destroyed and Santa Fe was besieged. The Puebloans surrounded the city and cut off its water supply. In desperation, on August 21, New Mexico Governor Antonio de Otermín, barricaded in the Palace of the Governors, sallied outside the palace with all of his available men and forced the Puebloans to retreat with heavy losses. He then led the Spaniards out of the city and retreated southward along the Rio Grande, headed for El Paso del Norte. The Puebloans shadowed the Spaniards but did not attack. The Spaniards who had taken refuge in Isleta had also retreated southward on August 15, and on September 6 the two groups of survivors, numbering 1,946, met at Socorro. About 500 of the survivors were Native American slaves. They were escorted to El Paso by a Spanish supply train. The Puebloans did not block their passage out of New Mexico.

== Popé's land ==
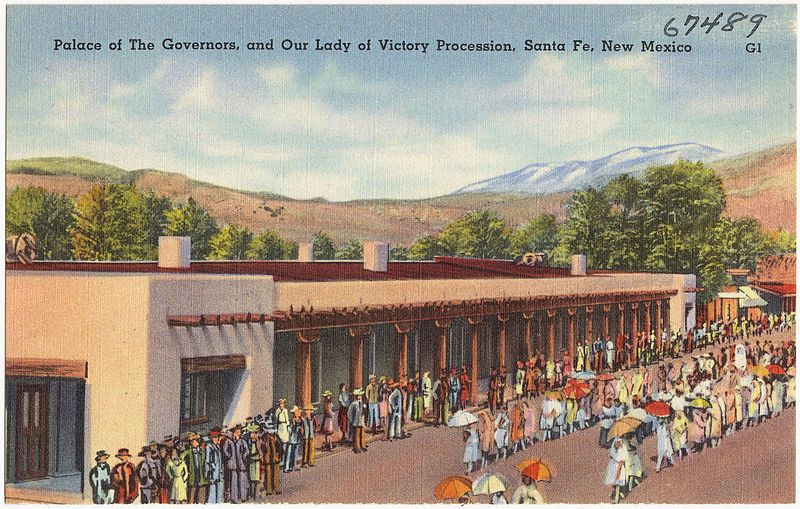
The Palace of the Governors in Santa Fe, seen here in a 1930s postcard, was besieged by the Pueblo in August 1680.

The retreat of the Spaniards left New Mexico in the power of the Puebloans. Popé was a mysterious figure in the history of the southwest as there are many tales among the Puebloans of what happened to him after the revolt.

Apparently, Popé and his two lieutenants, Alonso Catiti from Santo Domingo and Luis Tupatu from Picuris, traveled from town to town ordering a return "to the state of their antiquity." All crosses, churches, and Christian images were to be destroyed. The people were ordered to cleanse themselves in ritual baths, to use their Puebloan names, and to destroy all vestiges of the Roman Catholic religion and Spanish culture, including Spanish livestock and fruit trees. Popé, it was said, forbade the planting of wheat and barley and commanded those natives who had been married according to the rites of the Catholic Church to dismiss their wives and to take others after the old native tradition.

Each pueblo was self-governing, and some, or all, apparently resisted Popé's demands for a return to a pre-Spanish existence. The paradise Popé had promised when the Spanish were expelled did not materialize. A drought continued, destroying Puebloan crops, and the raids by Apache and Navajo increased. Initially, however, the Puebloans were united in their objective of preventing a return of the Spanish.

Popé was deposed as the leader of the Puebloans about a year after the revolt and disappears from history. He is believed to have died shortly before the Spanish reconquest in 1692.

== Spanish attempt to return ==
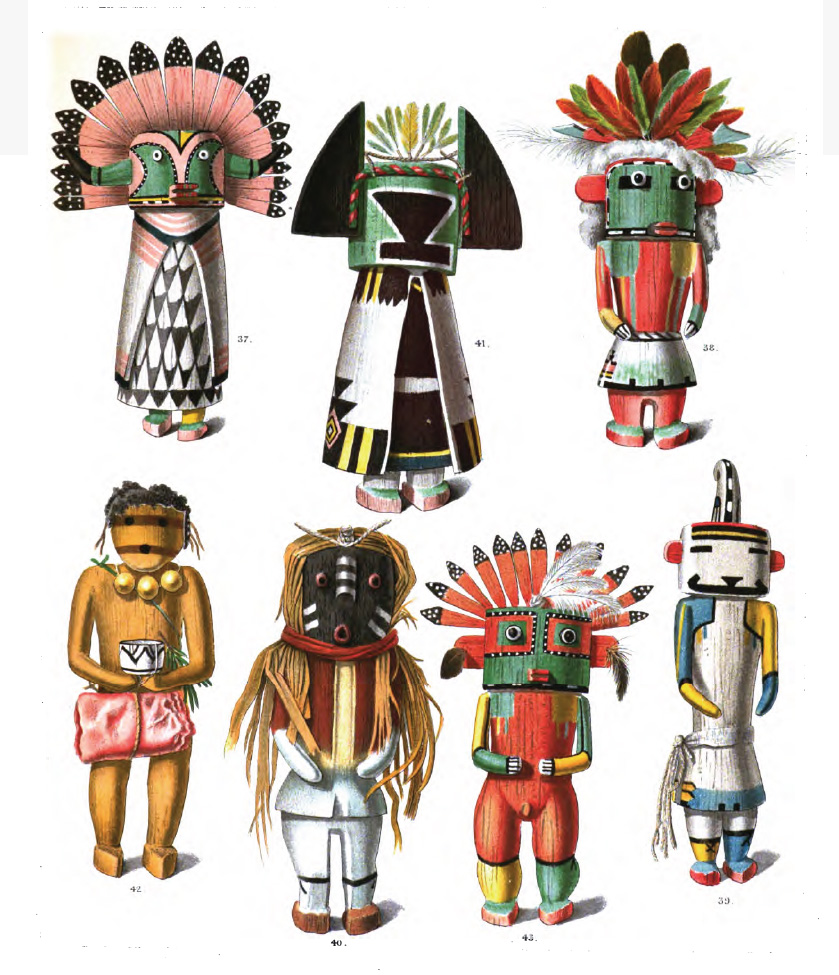
The primary cause of the Pueblo Revolt was probably the attempt by the Spanish to destroy the religion of the Puebloans, banning traditional dances and religious icons such as these kachina dolls.

In November 1681, Antonio de Otermin attempted to return to New Mexico. He assembled a force of 146 Spanish and an equal number of native soldiers in Paso del Norte (now known as Ciudad Juarez) and marched north along the Rio Grande. He first encountered the Piro pueblos, which had been abandoned and their churches destroyed. At Isleta Pueblo, he fought a brief battle with the inhabitants and then accepted their surrender. Staying in Isleta, he dispatched a company of soldiers and natives to establish Spanish authority. The following year, 1681, Otermin traveled quickly over Pueblo country in an effort to ascertain the reasons behind the uprising and identify its commanders. Some of the captives he had taken responded. Their reply is still regarded as a joke of legend. When questioning several of the Pueblo men who had been taken prisoner, the Spanish governor said, "Tell me, who was the leader of the revolt?" A Keresan captive responded, "Oh, it was Payastiamo." The governor followed up with, "Where does he live?" "Over that way," the Keresan remarked, gesturing to the mountains. In response to the same query, a Tewa or Tano man said, "Poheyemo is the leader's name. He lives up that way," pointing in the direction of the mountains to the north. A Towa man responded, "His name is Payastiabo, and he lives up that way," pointing toward the mountains. The joke is that these are the names of deities to whom the Pueblos pray to intercede for them with the One above, beyond the clouds. The Puebloans feigned surrender while gathering a large force to oppose Otermin. With the threat of a Puebloan attack growing, on January 1, 1682, Otermin decided to return to Paso del Norte, burning pueblos and taking the people of Isleta with him. The first Spanish attempt to regain control of New Mexico had failed.

Some of the Isleta later returned to New Mexico, but others remained in Paso del Norte, living in the Ysleta del Sur Pueblo. The Piro also moved to Paso del Norte to live among the Spaniards, eventually forming part of the Piro, Manso, and Tiwa tribe.

The Spanish were never able to re-convince some Puebloans to join Santa Fe de Nuevo México, and the Spanish often returned seeking peace instead of reconquest. For example, the Hopi remained free of any Spanish attempt at reconquest; though they did, at several non-violent attempts, try for unsuccessful peace treaties and unsuccessful trade agreements. For some Puebloans, the Revolt was a success in its objective to drive away Spanish influence. However, the Pueblos did not mourn the Spaniards' departure. Food grew scarce; starvation was unavoidable, and raids became increasingly common. Extra care was used to safeguard the food supply of the Pueblos along with their women and children. In 1691 or 1692, a delegation of Pueblo men from Jemez, Zia, Santa Ana, San Felipe, Pecos, and several Tanos traveled to Guadalupe del Paso to negotiate with the expelled Spaniards. According to tribal history, the Pueblo men invited the Spaniards to return.

== Reconquest ==
The Spanish return to New Mexico was prompted by their fears of French advances into the Mississippi valley and their desire to create a defensive frontier against the increasingly aggressive nomadic tribes on their northern borders. In August 1692, Diego de Vargas marched to Santa Fe unopposed along with a converted Zia war captain, Bartolomé de Ojeda. De Vargas, with only sixty soldiers, one hundred Indian auxiliaries or native soldiers, seven cannons (which he used as leverage against the Pueblo inside Santa Fe), and one Franciscan priest, arrived at Santa Fe on September 13. He promised the 1,000 Pueblo people assembled there clemency and protection if they would swear allegiance to the King of Spain and return to the Christian faith. After a while the Pueblo rejected the Spaniards. After much persuading, the Spanish finally made the Pueblo agree to peace. On September 14, 1692, de Vargas proclaimed a formal act of repossession. It was the thirteenth town he had reconquered for God and King in this manner, he wrote jubilantly to the Conde de Galve, viceroy of New Spain. During the next month de Vargas visited other Pueblos and accepted their acquiescence to Spanish rule.

Though the 1692 agreement to peace was bloodless, in the years that followed de Vargas maintained increasingly severe control over the increasingly defiant Pueblo. De Vargas returned to Mexico and gathered together about 800 people, including 100 soldiers, and returned to Santa Fe on December 16, 1693. This time, however, 70 Pueblo warriors and 400 family members within the town opposed his entry. De Vargas and his forces staged a quick and bloody recapture that concluded with the surrender and execution of the 70 Pueblo warriors on December 30, and their surviving families (about 400 women and children) were sentenced to ten years' servitude and distributed to the Spanish colonists as slaves.

In 1696 the residents of fourteen pueblos attempted a second organized revolt, launched with the murders of five missionaries and thirty-four settlers and using weapons the Spanish themselves had traded to the natives over the years; de Vargas's retribution was unmerciful, thorough and prolonged. By the end of the century the last resisting Pueblo town had surrendered and the Spanish reconquest was essentially complete. Many of the Pueblos, however, fled New Mexico to join the Apache or Navajo or to attempt to re-settle on the Great Plains. After the Pueblos were defeated, the Picuris—under the leadership of Luis Tupatu—joined their longtime allies, the Jicarilla Apaches, in El Cuartolejo, which is now in western Kansas and lies east of Pueblo, Colorado.

While the independence of many pueblos from the Spaniards was short-lived, the Pueblo Revolt gained the Pueblo people a measure of freedom from future Spanish efforts to eradicate their culture and religion following the reconquest. Moreover, the Spanish issued substantial land grants to each Pueblo and appointed a public defender to protect the rights of the Native Americans and argue their legal cases in the Spanish courts. The Franciscan priests returning to New Mexico did not again attempt to impose a theocracy on the Pueblo who continued to practice their traditional religion.

== Rise of Great Plains horse cultures ==
The revolt may have increased the spread of horses onto the Great Plains when the Pueblos seized the livestock abandoned by the fleeing Spaniards, although genetic and archaeological studies indicate that a native horse culture was already widely established by the first half of the 17th century.

== In popular culture ==
The 1994 Star Trek: The Next Generation episode "Journey's End" references the Pueblo Revolt, in the context of ancestors of different characters having been involved in the revolt.

In 1995, in Albuquerque, La Compañía de Teatro de Albuquerque produced the bilingual play Casi Hermanos, written by Ramon Flores and James Lujan. It depicted events leading up to the Pueblo Revolt, inspired by accounts of two half-brothers who met on opposite sides of the battlefield.

A statue of Po'Pay by sculptor Cliff Fragua was added to the National Statuary Hall Collection in the United States Capitol Building in 2005 as one of New Mexico's two statues. The knotted cord in his left hand was used to time the start of the revolt. Although the exact number of knots utilized is up for debate, (sculptor Cliff Fragua) believes that planning and informing the majority of the Pueblos must have taken many days. The bear fetish in his right hand represents the Pueblo religion, which is the center of the Pueblo universe. The pot behind him represents Pueblo culture, and the deer hide he wears is a humble representation of his role as a provider. The necklace he wears serves as a continual reminder of where life began, and he dresses in Pueblo style, with a loin cloth and moccasins. His hair is cut in the Pueblo style and wrapped in a chongo. The scars left over from the whipping he endured for his involvement in and devotion to Pueblo customs and religion are on his back.

In 2005, in Los Angeles, Native Voices at the Autry produced Kino and Teresa, an adaptation of Romeo and Juliet written by Taos Pueblo playwright James Lujan. Set five years after the Spanish Reconquest of 1692, the play links actual historical figures with their literary counterparts to dramatize how both sides learned to live together and form the culture that is present-day New Mexico.

In 2011, Taos Pueblo singer Robert Mirabal's new one-man show, "Po'pay Speaks," was advertised as "a dramatic presentation of the history and continuing influence of the great leader of the 1680 Pueblo revolt." According to the original script, which Mirabal, Steve Parks, and Nelson Zink of Taos wrote, Po'pay never died. He has been living in seclusion in the mountains for the entire time, observing the oddities of history as it has been shaped by the individuals he assisted in rescuing 331 years ago.

In 2016, Jason Garcia (Okuu Pin-Turtle Mountain) created artwork to capture the ever-changing cultural landscape of Santa Clara Pueblo, New Mexico. Garcia's art is influenced by Tewa traditional rites, customs, and storytelling, as well as 21st-century popular culture, comic books and technology. Garcia uses comic books as a medium for expression in his clay tile "Tewa Tales of Suspense!" A muscled Po'Pay towers over the helmeted conquistadors as a mission chapel burns. A close examination of his "Corn Dance Girls" jar reveals a satellite TV antenna emerging from the Pueblo behind the figures.

In 2018, Virgil Ortiz of (Cochiti Pueblo), began making ceramic work about the Pueblo Revolt of 1680 within a science fiction narrative that proposes that in the year 2180, a second Pueblo Revolt takes place that is led by a female warrior. The project later developed to include video, performance, costume design, and photography and augmented reality. The work has been described as hyper-fiction, involving "shape-shifting, time-jumping, sci-fi fantasy" re-telling of the Revolt.

In 2023, in Berkeley, Alter Theater Ensemble produced the world premiere of, "Pueblo Revolt", a Rella Lossy Award winning play written by Mississippi Choctaw, Laguna Pueblo, and Isleta Pueblo playwright Dillon Chitto. A comedy about two Indigenous brothers living in Isleta Pueblo before, during, and after the revolt, the play asks, "When history is in the making, what do ordinary people do?".

== Pueblo Revolt leaders and their home pueblos ==
- Ku-htihth (Cochiti): Antonio Malacate
- Galisteo (Galisteo): Juan El Tano
- Walatowa (Jemez): Luis Conixu
- Nambé (Nambé): Diego Xenome
- Welai (Picuris): Luis Tupatu (Ciervo Blanco)
- Powhogeh (San Ildefonso): Francisco El Ollito and Nicolas de la Cruz Jonv
- Ohkay (San Juan): Po'pay and Tagu
- San Lazaro: Antonio Bolsas and Cristobal Yope
- Khapo (Santa Clara): Domingo Naranjo and Cajete
- Kewa (Santo Domingo): Alonzo Catiti
- Teotho (Taos): El Saca
- Tehsugeh (Tesuque): Domingo Romero

== See also ==
- List of battles fought in New Mexico
- List of conflicts in the United States
- List of Indigenous rebellions in Mexico and Central America
- Spanish missions in New Mexico
- Fiestas de Santa Fe
- Zozobra
- California mission clash of cultures
- Astialakwa

== Bibliography ==
- Espinosa, J. Manuel. The Pueblo Indian revolt of 1696 and the Franciscan missions in New Mexico: letters of the missionaries and related documents, Norman : University of Oklahoma Press, 1988.
- Hackett, Charles Wilson. Revolt of the Pueblo Indians of New Mexico and Otermín's Attempted Reconquest, 1680–1682, 2 vols, Albuquerque: University of New Mexico Press, 1942.
- Knaut, Andrew L. The Pueblo Revolt of 1680, Norman: University of Oklahoma Press, 1995.
- Liebmann, Matthew. Revolt: An Archaeological History of Pueblo Resistance and Revitilization in 17th Century New Mexico, Tucson: University of Arizona Press, 2012.
- Ponce, Pedro, "Trouble for the Spanish, the Pueblo Revolt of 1680", Humanities, November/December 2002, Volume 23/Number 6.
- PBS The West – Events from 1650 to 1800
- Reséndez, Andrés (2016). The Other Slavery: The Uncovered Story of Indian Enslavement in America. Houghton Mifflin Harcourt. p. 448. ISBN 978-0544602670.
- Salpointe, Jean Baptiste, Soldiers of the Cross; Notes on the Ecclesiastical History of New-Mexico, Arizona and Colorado, Salisbury, N.C.: Documentary Publications, 1977 (reprint from 1898).
- Simmons, Mark, New Mexico: An Interpretive History, Albuquerque: University of New Mexico Press, 1977.
- Weber, David J. ed., What Caused the Pueblo Revolt of 1680? New York: Bedford/St. Martin's Press, 1999.
- Preucel, Robert W., 2002. Archaeologies of the Pueblo Revolt: Identity, Meaning, and Renewal in the Pueblo World. University of New Mexico Press: Albuquerque.
- Wilcox, Michael V., "The Pueblo Revolt and the Mythology of conquest: an Indigenous archaeology of contact", University of California Press, 2009.
