= Apache Campaign (1732) =

Apache campaign (1732)
- Part of the Apache-Spanish Wars
Date	22 October – 22 December 1732
Location	Spanish Texas, Viceroyalty of New Spain
Result	Spanish victory

Belligerents
Spain	Lipan Apaches; Natagé Apaches

Commanders and leaders
Juan Antonio Bustillo y Ceballos	Unknown

Strength
157–160 Spanish soldiers 60 auxiliary natives 900 horses and mules	700 warriors

Casualties and losses
1 killed 7 wounded 20 horses stolen	200–300 killed 30–38 captured 700 horses and 100 mules captured

The Apache Campaign of 1732 was a Spanish punitive expedition against the Lipan and Natagé Apaches in response to a wave of raids upon the Spanish province of Texas which had begun in 1731 after a period of peace. The campaign was authorized by the viceroy of New Spain, the Marquis of Casa Fuerte, following the advice of captain Fernando Pérez de Almazán, governor of San Antonio de Béjar. The then governor of the province, Juan Antonio Bustillo y Ceballos, led a force of about 160 cavalry soldiers, 60 auxiliary natives from the Texas missions and a large horse herd which left San Antonio de Béjar on 22 October, advancing northwards to the San Gabriel River, where they expected a contingent of Allied Teyas natives which failed to show.

Resuming the march on 1 November, the expedition followed the Little River, then crossed the Colorado and entered the Apacheria. An Indian scout spotted four Apache rancherías numbering some 400 tipis by the side of San Sabá River on 8 December. Leaving behind the herd and the baggage, Bustillo proceeded to attack the Apache camps with 100 soldiers the next day at morning. After a five-hour battle where the Spanish proved superior thanks to their leather protections and muskets, the Apaches fled from their camps, leaving behind 30 captives and a large horse herd. The Spanish expedition then returned to San Antonio with the booty, harassed by the Apaches along the march, finally arriving on 22 December.

== Background ==
In early 18th-century, increasing pressure by the Comanches migrating from the north, provided by the French with horses and firearms, drove the Lipan Apaches and other Apache groups from northeastern New Mexico to the Llano Estacado and the High Plains of Texas. The Lipans settled between the Brazos and Colorado rivers until 1722–1723, when they moved south to the San Sabá River and started raiding the surroundings of the Spanish settlement of San Antonio de Béjar, established in 1718, looking for horses and cattle.

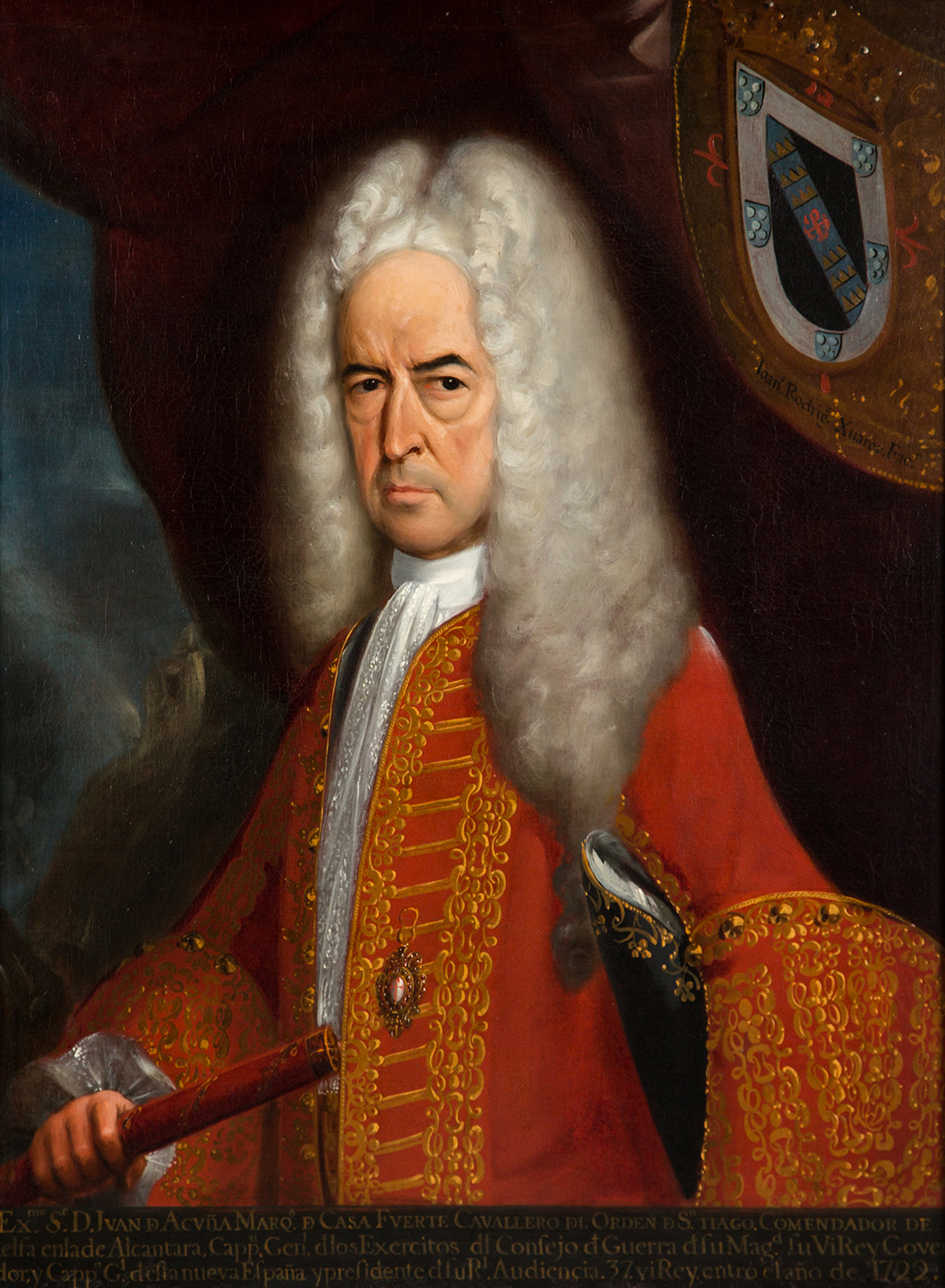
Juan de Acuña, 2nd Marquis of Casa Fuerte, who authorized the campaign, by Juan Rodríguez Juárez, Museo Nacional de Historia, México.

As new Spanish settlers arrived, San Antonio grew into a town and four missions were founded in the area to Christianize the nearby Coahuiltecan natives. Looking at the growing Spanish presence as a threat, in 1731 the Lipan elders declared war upon San Antonio and allied themselves with the Natagés, some Teyas and the Jumanos. Raids and attacks upon isolated groups of settlers and troops escalated into a larger clash in September in which 20 Spanish soldiers who were chasing Lipans who had stolen horses from the garrison were ambushed by a force of 500 warriors. 2 soldiers were killed and 13 wounded before the Apaches withdrew.

Captain Fernando Pérez de Almazán, in charge of the Béjar garrison, requested the Marquis of Casa Fuerte, viceroy of New Spain, permission and reinforcements to mount a punishment expedition against the Lipans. The viceroy agreed, but instructed him to look first for support from native allies. In the first months of 1732, the San Antonio garrison was bolstered by 200 men from Nuevo León and Coahuila. Additionally, Almazán recruited 100 men from the town, the villages nearby and the missions. Before he could launch the expedition, however, he was replaced as its leader by the governor of Texas, Juan Antonio Bustillo y Ceballos.

== Expedition ==
Bustillo left San Antonio on 22 October 1732, with 157-160 Spanish soldiers, 60 auxiliary natives, one cannon, 900 horses and mules and 140 pack-loads of supplies. In order not to alert the Apaches, and also the gather help from native allies, they made a long detour by marching north to the San Gabriel River. There Bustillo expected a group of Teyas to join them. However, they failed to show, as one ot their chiefs, nicknamed El Francés ('the French') because of his devotion to the French from Louisiana, convinced them that the Spanish wanted to lure the warriors far from their villages to then raid them.

The Spanish continued their march on 1 November, cautiously advancing to the northwest along the Little River. As they were now in an unexplored region, Bustillo send scouts in various directions, but no Apaches were found. He was resolved to go as far as New Mexico to catch them, so the march continued upwards to the Colorado River and then to the San Sabá. On 8 December, after six weeks of search, an Indian scout named Asencio reported that he had located four enemy rancherías numbering about 400 buffalo-hide tipis up the San Sabá. The groups present were identified as 'Apaches' (the Mescalero-affiliated Natagés), Ypandi or Pelones and Yxandi (Lipans) and Chenti (maybe Teyas). Bustillo camped fives leagues away from the Apache villages and held a war council. Despite Asencio stated that he had never seen so many Indians together, the Spanish officers resolved to attack them.

Bustillo left behind his horse herd and the supplies under a heavy guard and advanced to the Apache villages with 100 soldiers, preceded by Indian scouts. They marched during the night across a rough and unexplored ground, failing to reach the Apache settlements before dawn. When they finally found them, another war council was held and some argued that it was better to conceal themselves until next day before attacking. However, Bustillo chose instead to attack immediately. On the morning of 9 December, absolution having been given by the priests, he arranged his troops in two ranks, with himself in between. Leaving behind the rough ground, they finally spotted the Apache villages on the other bank of the river. They counted about 700 Apache warriors on horseback and clad in leather armour.

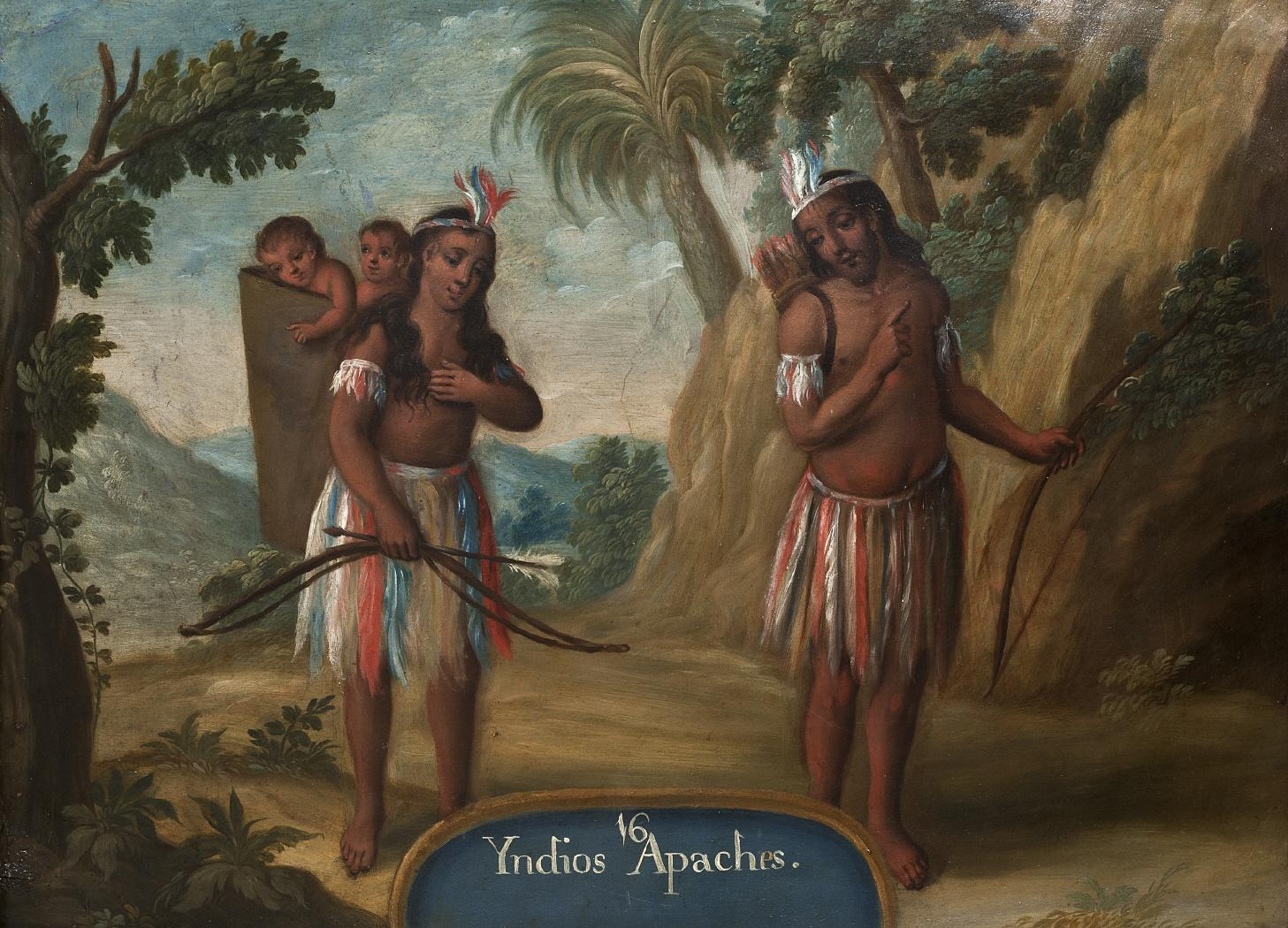
An Apache family, oil on canvas, Mexican school, ca. 1775, Museo de América, Madrid.

The Spanish crossed the river, dismounted and attacked with musketry fire. The Apaches waited until the soldiers had discharged their weapons and then charged upon them repeatedly, but were unable to broke their ranks. The battle lasted five hours, after which the Apaches, discouraged by the death of one of their chiefs, who had a silver cane, abandoned their rancherías and fled into the high ground. The victors took 30 to 38 prisoners, either mostly women and children or 30 men and 8 women, according to father Domingo Cabello, one of the priests involved in the expedition. They also gathered a large booty: 700 horses and 100 mules packed with buckskins, buffalo hides and other goods. The Apache casualties were estimated to be 200 or 300 dead warriors, but without much certainty, as the fallen warriors were thrown into the river during the fight by their brothers in arms. The silver cane of the dead Apache chief was taken by the chief of the Pampopas mission Indians. The Spanish had eight wounded soldiers, one of which died five days later.

After the Apaches fled, the Spanish returned to their camp with their booty and captives. Bustillo left a strong rearguard of 50 soldiers, as he rightly regarded that the Apaches would harass them on their way back. A Spanish ambush foiled them, but despite this they continued to follow Bustillo's force, stealing 20 horses along the march straight back to San Antonio, where the expedition arrived 15 days after the battle.

== Aftermath ==
The loss of 200 or 300 warriors was a serious blow to the Apaches, but it did not stop their raids. Back at San Antonio, prisoners were interrogated and revealed that the rancherías at San Sabá were a war camp. A much larger one, comprising 4 leagues covered by Lipan tipis with about 1,700 people, 500 of whom were absent hunting buffalos, was further north. Bustillo tried to use the captives to make peace with the Apaches, but without success. By 1734, the raids spread across the Río Grande to Coahuila. Campaigns under José de Urrutia, his son Toribio de Urrutia and Pedro de Rábago y Terán from 1739 to 1748, together with a growing pressure from the Comanches, finally led to a peace treaty in 1749 between the Spanish and the Lipans, and the establishment of the Mission of San Sabá in 1757.
