= Melchor de Mediavilla y Azcona =

Acting governor of Texas from 1727 to 1731

12th Governor of the Spanish Colony of Texas
- In office 1727–1731
- Preceded by: Fernando Pérez de Almazán
- Succeeded by: Juan Antonio Bustillo y Ceballos

Personal details
- Profession: Political

Melchor de Mediavilla y Azcona was the acting governor of Texas between 1727 and 1731.

== Biography ==
Mediavilla y Azcona was born in the early eighteenth century. He was appointed Captain of the Presidio of Bexar. Later, Governor Fernando Pérez de Almazán became him in lieutenant governor. This office allowed him to occupy the positions of acting governor and interim governor of Texas when Almazán decided to resign from his charge as governor in 1727.

Under his administration, Mediavilla y Azcona promoted the foundation of several missions by friars in a zone located between the Colorado and Brazos Rivers, although these foundations (the San Xavier missions) were carried out in 1748 and 1749, when Azcona had left the office of governor of Texas.

While Mediavilla y Azcona was governor, Inspector Pedro de Rivera y Villalón revised political management of Mediavilla and found several errors in his administration of the presidio. Villalón recommended to the Viceroy to reduce the number of officials of the presidio, as well as the price of the supplies that the garrison needed, and to remove some of their equipment, because not all that was in the garrison was necessary. He also indicated that the Presidio de Nuestra Señora de los Dolores should be removed and the number of military men that formed the garrison of Nuestra Señora del Pilar was too high and should be limited to only 60 people. Mediavilla accepted Rivera's suggestions and these were carried out, despite the fact that the Viceroy of New Spain, Juan de Acuña, had refused to approve its realization. This caused disaffection among Mediavilla and the viceroy.

On 5 March 1731 (and following the Rivera's advice), three missions were renamed in San Antonio:

- Nuestra Señora de la Purísima Concepción de los Hainai was renamed Nuestra Señora de la Purisima Concepción de Acuña;
- San Francisco de los Neches was renamed San Francisco de la Espada;
- San Jose de los Nazones was renamed San Juan Capistrano.

On the other hand, in March 1731, when a group of Spanish settlers from the Canary Islands came to San Antonio to help populate the place, it was the captain of the presidio of San Antonio, Juan Antonio Perez de Almazan (and not Mediavilla), who was in charge of welcoming them and providing them with accommodation. This was because Mediavilla was never an official governor of Texas, as he never was appointed to the position by the viceroy of New Spain, but only by the previous governor.

He governed the province until 1731, when the Viceroy Acuña appointed a new governor, Juan Antonio Bustillo y Ceballos.
