= Gregorio Álvarez Tuñón y Quirós =

Gregorio Álvarez Tuñón y Quirós (1683–1728) was a presidio captain and alcalde mayor in New Spain. Historian John L. Kessell describes Tuñón y Quirós as a "provincial entrepreneur", while David Yetman says he was "widely known as the most corrupt official in the region".

== Biography ==
Tuñón y Quirós was born in 1683 in Valladolid, Spain, the oldest of twelve children. He traveled to New Spain and arrived in Sonora at age nineteen, joining his uncle, Spanish general Jacinto de Fuensaldaña. In 1701, Tuñón y Quirós assisted Fuensaldaña in displacing Domingo Jironza Petriz de Cruzate as captain of Fronteras presidio.

In 1706, Tuñón y Quirós received title to the local mines at San Juan Bautista de Sonora. That same year, he became alcalde mayor of Sonora, a position he held until succeeded by Raphael Pacheco Zevallos in 1723. In 1710, he succeeded his uncle as captain for life of Fronteras.

In 1724, Tuñón y Quirós led three attacks against nearby Apaches. For the most part, however, he neglected his presidio, employing the garrison in herding his cattle and mining his silver. Due to his absenteeism, citizens of northern Sonora turned to Antonio Becerra Nieto at Janos Presidio for military support. Tuñón y Quirós also routinely drew salaries for nonexistent soldiers, forging papers and using criminals or vecinos as stand-ins during inspections. Many locals lodged complaints against him for embezzlement, including a 1718 complaint to Nieto which led to an official inspection.

Tuñón y Quirós maintained an opulent household, including, at the time of his death, four slaves. He clashed with the local Jesuit missionaries over land and native labor, and led a petition calling for the Jesuit expulsion from Mexico.

In 1726, inspector general Pedro de Rivera y Villalón arrived in Fronteras, where he arraigned Tuñón y Quirós on fifteen counts. Rivera passed summary judgement on two counts of embezzlement and removed Tuñón y Quirós from his post, assigning Juan Bautista de Anza I in his place. The remaining charges went to trial in Mexico City, adjudicated by the viceroy, Juan de Acuña. After consulting with Juan Manuel de Oliván Rebolledo, de Acuña confirmed the removal. By that time, however, Tuñón y Quirós was already dead, having fallen victim to an epidemic in the spring of 1728.
