= Juan Antonio Bustillo y Ceballos =

13th Governor of the Spanish Colony of Texas
- In office 1730–1734
- Preceded by: Melchor de Mediavilla y Azcona
- Succeeded by: Manuel de Sandoval

Governor of Coahuila
- In office 1754–1756
- Preceded by: Pedro de Rábago y Terán
- Succeeded by: Miguel de Sesman y Escudero

Personal details
- Profession: Politician and Soldier

Juan Antonio Bustillo y Ceballos (Zevallos) was a soldier and politician who served as governor of Province of Texas (1730–1734) and Coahuila, New Spain (1754–1756). He also served as alcalde ordinario (ordinary mayor) in Mexico City.

== Early life ==
Ceballos was born between the late seventeenth and early eighteenth centuries. He settled in Texas in 1723, living there for twelve years.

== Governor in Texas ==
Between 1724 and 1731 he served as captain of the Presidio Nuestra Señora de Loreto de la Bahía. In 1730, he helped restore Querétaro missions in San Antonio (originally were in East Texas) and in the following year, the viceroy of New Spain, Juan de Acuña, appointed him governor of Texas.

He arrived to Los Adaes, Texas' capital, on April 28, 1731, carrying several hundred of heads of livestock and many supplies.

He promoted the settlement of Spanish settlers from the Canary Islands in Bexar (modern San Antonio) in 1731. In the following year, Bustillo led a military confrontation against the Apaches, which took place between the San Xavier (San Gabriel) and San Saba rivers. The troop was made up of two hundreds and twenty men, mostly Spaniards but also sixty Native Americans, and managed to defeat the Apaches. After this, there were no more Apache attacks, raids or wars for a while. Later, in 1734, Bustillo decided to leave his position as governor, being replaced by Manuel de Sandoval, and he took the road back to Mexico.

== Mexico ==
In Mexico he won major political offices. He was appointed alcalde ordinaro (ordinary mayor) of Mexico City. In 1751, he worked for the Audiencia Real, the main administrative court of the Viceroyalty. At this time, the Audience approved the establishment of several missions in San Javier, even though Bustillo did not support their foundations (as he explained in 1746). Three years later, in 1754, Bustillo was appointed deputy governor and acting governor of Coahuila. On December 21 of that year, Bustillo helped Franciscan Alonso Giraldo de Terreros in the founding of the Mission San Lorenzo, in the vicinity of San Fernando de Austria, Coahuila.

== Legacy ==
The San Saba River was named by Bustillo y Ceballos in 1732. He called it Río de San Sabá de las Nueces, because he and his troops had arrived on the feast day of St. Sabbas, which was held in honor of a sixth-century monk.
