= San Juan Bautista de Sonora =

Real de San Juan Bautista de Sonora was the location of one of the first silver mines in Sonora, then part of New Spain. Now ruined, it lies near to the town of Cumpas, founded in 1643 by the Jesuit missionary Egidio Monteffio.

The name of Sonora seems to have first been given to the principal valley or to the San Juan Bautista mining district, and later was used for the whole province. Rich mineral deposits were discovered at San Juan Bautista in 1657. The Presidio de las Fronteras de Sonora was created in 1690, an armed force with no permanent base, but operating at first out of the San Juan Bautista mining camp. In 1693 Domingo Jironza Petriz de Cruzate, former governor of New Mexico, was made captain for life of the Presidio of Fronteras and alcalde mayor of Sonora, holding office until 1701. In 1702 Don Juan Francisco de Bustamante y Velasco was appointed alcaldía mayor of San Juan Bautista. As of 1724 San Juan Bautista was within the province of Nueva Vizcaya, and was administered by the Alcalde mayor de Sonora y minas de San Juan Bautista.

In 1722, San Juan Bautista was the scene of meetings where the leading citizens and civil authorities of the provinces of Sinaloa and Sonora Ostimuri drew up proposals to radically overhaul the system of government, then dominated by the Jesuits missions. They proposed a secular organization with mission lands divided between Indians and settlers, and with Indians given the freedom to work where they wanted. The meetings were convened by Rafael Pacheco Cevallos and captain Gregorio Álvarez Tuñón y Quirós. Two deputies were chosen to represent the communities, a miner and a merchant.

In 1726, Pedro de Rivera y Villalón arrived at San Juan Bautista in the course of inspecting the northern presidios. In response to longstanding complaints of corruption lodged against Tuñón y Quirós, Rivera replaced him with Juan Bautista de Anza I.

A description of Sonora in 1767 said the mine had been abandoned, with its shafts flooded, due to the hostility of the Apaches. Today the land is used for pasturage. Due to its historical significance, the site has been registered with the National Institute of Anthropology and History, and is protected by the 1972 Federal law for archaeological, historical and artistic zones and monuments.
