= Governor Perez =

Governor Perez may refer to:

== Argentina ==
- Francisco Pérez (governor) (born 1969), governor of Mendoza in 2011

== Colonial Spain ==
- Luis Pérez Dasmariñas, governor of the Philippines from 1593 to 1596
- Fernando Pérez de Almazán, governor of Texas from 1722 to 1727

== Mexico ==
- Albino Pérez (died 1837), governor of New Mexico from 1835 to 1837
- Manuel Pérez Treviño (1890–1945), governor of Coahuila from 1925 to 1929
- Joaquin A. Pérez, governor of the Federal District from 1873 to 1876

== Venezuela ==
- César Pérez Vivas (born 1957), governor of Táchira from 2008 to 2012
- Pablo Pérez Álvarez (born 1969), governor of Zulia from 2008 to 2012
