= Juan Bautista de Anza I =

Spanish militar and explorer (1693–1740)

- Born: June 29, 1693; Hernani, Gipuzkoa (Spanish - Guipuzcoa), Basque Country, Spain
- Died: May 9, 1740 (aged 46); Santa María Suamca - Terrenate Presidio
- Occupation: Explorer

Juan Bautista de Anza I (June 29, 1693 - May 9, 1740) was a Spanish Basque who explored a great part of what is today the Mexican state of Sonora and the southwest region of the United States.

== Biography ==
Born on June 29, 1693, in the Basque village of Hernani, Gipuzkoa, Basque Country, Spain. Juan Bautista de Anza (he spelled it Anssa; his namesake son spelled it Anza and added "de") was the eldest son and second child of Antonio Anssa (1666-1737), the town pharmacist, and Lucia de Sassoeta (1658-1735). Barely able to speak a word of Spanish, at the age of nineteen, in 1712, he migrated to New Spain, going first to Culiacán, Sinaloa, where his mother had relatives already established. However, Anza did not stay there long, and was soon involved in silver mining in Álamos, Sonora. From there he became involved in the discovery and exploitation of two important silver mining camps, or boomtowns, between 1716 and 1720, at Aguaje southeast of present-day Hermosillo, Sonora, and at Tetuachi, south of Arizpe. He bought other mining properties, such as the Real de San Jose de Basochuca, Sonora, east of Arizpe and by early 1721 he had become a lieutenant in the Sonora militia. Shortly after that, on August 2, 1721, he joined the regular cavalry as an alférez, or second lieutenant, at the Janos Presidio, under Captain Antonio Bezerra Nieto. As a soldier he was described as being "of sound body, white [and] bearded, with faded auburn hair." Soon after beginning his military career at Janos, about the year 1722, he married the Captain's daughter, Maria Rosa Bezerra Nieto, and quickly rose to the rank of first lieutenant.

== Military career ==
In November of 1726, Pedro de Rivera y Villalón promoted Anza to the rank of captain and assigned him to take the place of Captain Gregorio Álvares Tuñón y Quirós at Fronteras, who had been at odds with the citizens of Sonora for years and had just been removed from office and ordered to Mexico City to stand trial for fraud and misuse of the king’s resources. Anza quickly set about whipping the Caballería de las Fronteras (Cavalry of the Frontier) into shape and providing protection to the communities of Sonora from the Apaches. He assigned soldiers to the San Luis and upper Santa Cruz River Valleys in the Pimería Alta, and settlers began to move into the area. He, himself, established the Guevavi, San Mateo, Sicurisuta, and Sópori Ranches, the first livestock operations in what is today southern Arizona.

== Explorer ==
At the time of the silver discovery near the Arizona Ranch in 1736, he was not only the captain of the sole presidio in Sonora, but he was justicia mayor, or chief justice, of Sonora as well. Thus, it fell to him to decide what course to take in establishing legalities at the new site. Because of his impounding of all the silver while Mexico City made the determination of to whom it belonged, and because of his using the house of Bernardo de Urrea, his good friend and deputy chief justice, at the Arizona Ranch as a base of operations, he inadvertently elevated the name Arizona into prominence. Thus, he and his escribano, or scribe, Manuel José de Sosa, who wrote all the documents pertaining to the silver, were indirectly responsible for the forty-eighth state of the United States having the name Arizona.

== End of his life ==
Anza continued as a soldier and statesman for the next few years, petitioning the viceroy for permission to discover and establish a route between Sonora and Alta California. Unfortunately for him, however, his dreams were cut short following a routine supply trip to Suamca, Guevavi, Tumacácori, and San Xavier del Bac. Returning home from that expedition on May 9, 1740, he evidently rode a little too far in front of his soldiers and was ambushed and killed by Apaches somewhere between Santa María Suamca and the ranch that would become the Terrenate Presidio. It would be left to the next generation of soldiers and his own son, Juan Bautista de Anza, of the same name to discover the route between Sonora and California.
