= Baltasar de Zúñiga, 1st Duke of Arión =

Mexican politician

The Duke of Arión
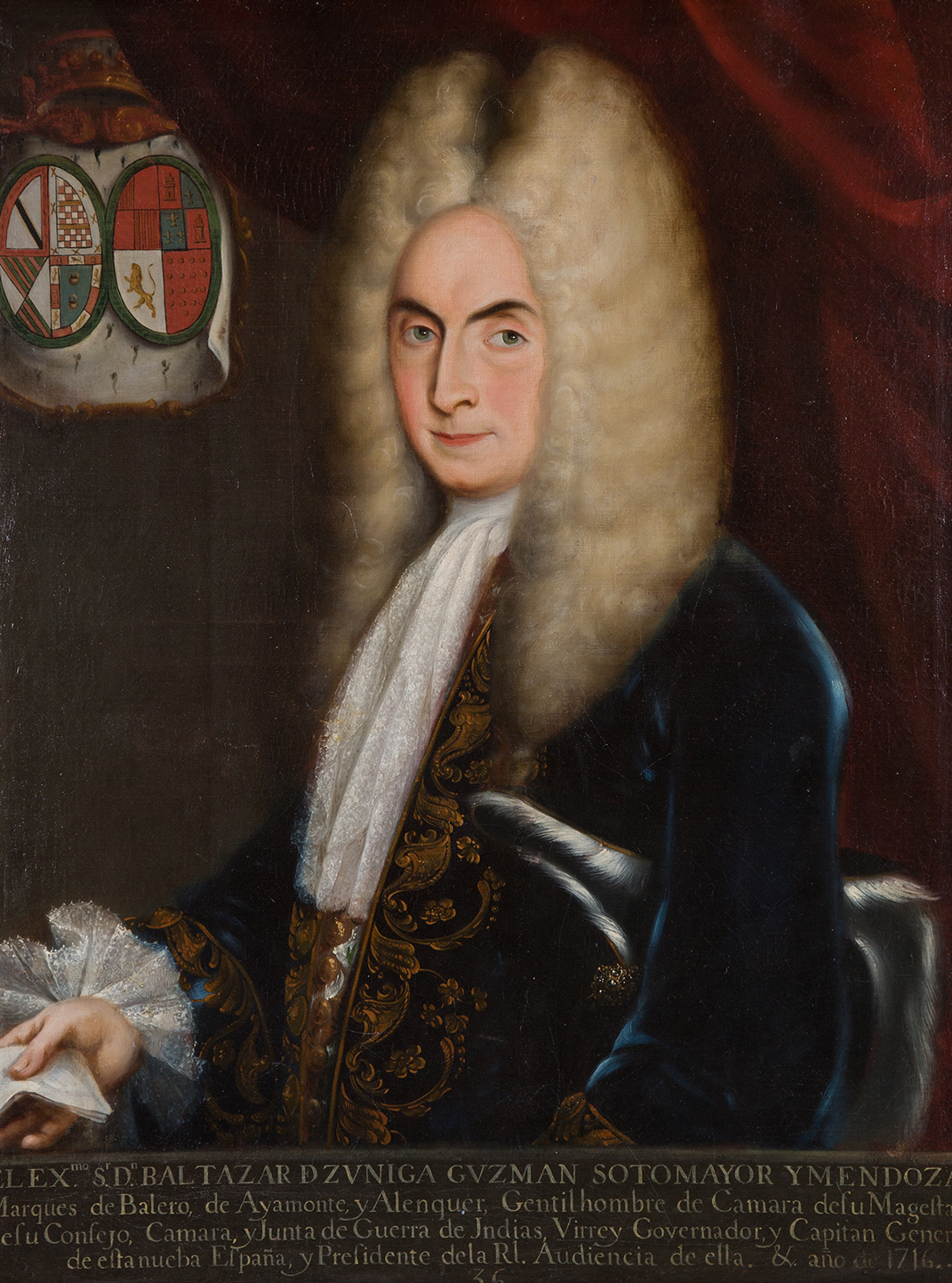

President of the Council of the Indies
- In office 1724 – 26 December 1727
- Monarch: Philip V of Spain
- Preceded by: Andrés de Pez
- Succeeded by: Cristóbal Gregorio Portocarrero, Count of Montijo

Viceroy of New Spain
- In office 16 August 1716 – 15 October 1722
- Monarch: Philip V of Spain
- Preceded by: Fernando de Alencastre, 1st Duke of Linares
- Succeeded by: Juan de Acuña, 1st Marquess of Casa Fuerte

Viceroy of Sardinia
- In office 1704–1707
- Monarch: Philip V of Spain
- Preceded by: Francisco Ruiz de Castro, Count of Lemos
- Succeeded by: Pedro Manuel Colón de Portugal

Viceroy of Navarre
- In office 15 November 1692 – 30 April 1697
- Monarch: Charles II of Spain
- Preceded by: Juan Manuel Fernández Pacheco, 8th Duke of Escalona
- Succeeded by: Juan Carlos de Batevile, Marquess of Conflans

Personal details
- Born: Baltasar de Zúñiga Guzmán Sotomayor y Mendoza c. 1658; Bejar, Spain
- Died: 26 December 1727 (aged 68–69); Madrid, Spain

Baltasar de Zúñiga y Guzmán, 1st Duke of Arión, 2nd Marquess of Valero (1658 in Spain – December 26, 1727 in Madrid) was Spanish viceroy of New Spain from August 16, 1716, to October 14, 1722, and later president of the Council of the Indies.

== Early life ==
Zúñiga y Guzmán was born in Spain in 1658, second son of Juan Manuel de Manrique y Zúñiga, and thus of royal blood.

With his elder brother he participated in the Great Turkish War and fought the Battle of Buda (1686), in which he was slightly wounded, but his brother killed. Between 1692 and 1697, he was Viceroy of Navarre.

At the start of the Spanish Succession War, he chose the side of Philip V and became Viceroy of Sardinia between 1704 and 1707.

== As viceroy of New Spain ==
He made his formal entrance into Mexico City on August 16, 1716, and received his office from the previous viceroy, Fernando de Alencastre, 1st Duke of Linares. Zúñiga was the first bachelor to be viceroy of New Spain. He was soon informed of famine in Texas, which was causing colonists to abandon their villages. He immediately ordered the governor of Coahuila to send aid to the region. He also ordered that the Indians be taught agriculture and animal husbandry.

In 1717 Florida Indian chiefs meeting in Pensacola asked to come to Mexico City. Viceroy Zúñiga sent a ship from the Armada de Barlovento (coast guard) to pick them up and transport them to Veracruz. They traveled by stagecoach from there to the capital, where they were received with honors. They accepted baptism and promised friendship to the Spaniards, a promise which they kept.

In 1717 the Spanish Crown established its monopoly on tobacco in Cuba and New Spain, and the private factories disappeared. The export of tobacco to Peru was prohibited. The changes resulted in a large increase in royal revenue.

In 1718 rebel Lipanes Indians surrendered in the Sierra Gorda (Tamaulipas). Missionaries were sent, and the Indians accepted Christianity. Rich mines were subsequently discovered in the region.

The first feria (festival) organized by the merchants of Jalapa was celebrated in late 1720. In 1722 Juan Ignacio María de Castorena Ursúa y Goyeneche began publishing a newspaper in Mexico City. The Hospital Real burned in 1722. Also in that year a principal idol of the Indians was burned in an auto de fe in Mexico City. The convent of Corpus Christi was founded for Indian nobles.

On June 16, 1718, as the viceroy was leaving the procession of Corpus Christi with the Audiencia, he was attacked with a knife on the stairs of the palace by a man named Nicolás Camacho. Zúñiga escaped without injury. Camacho was arrested, judged insane, and committed to the Hospital of San Hipólito.

== Foreign relations ==
During his tenure as viceroy, Zúñiga was faced the issue of the British colonial settlement at Laguna de Términos (in present-day Campeche). This site had been occupied almost continuously since 1663 by English-speaking buccaneers and colonists who harvested tropical timbers in violation of Spanish law. In 1714 alone, 150 British merchant ships transported logwood from the settlement for sale in American and European markets; in the same year, the British maintained a garrison of 1,000 men, 16 fortifications, six men-of-war, four brigantines and six sloops in Laguna de Términos in support of the settlement's logging activities.

In 1716, Zúñiga sent a Spanish fleet from Veracruz, under the command of Alonso Felipe de Andrade, to liquidate the British settlement. They took the British by surprise, and were successful in capturing the settlement. The valuable property captured by the Spanish from the settlement, including harvested timbers, amply repaid the costs of the expedition. A Spanish garrison was established on Laguna de Términos, and Andrade was named governor. The garrison fought off an attack from a British force of 335 men on July 16, 1717, but Andrade was killed in action during the fighting. His descendants were honored with the hereditary position of captain of dragoons.

Zúñiga also advanced the Spanish colonization of Texas and established four advance posts in the region to expel the French presence in the region. In addition he conquered Nayarit and reconstructed the fortifications in Florida. On May 19, 1719, shortly after the declaration of war between France and Spain, the French disembarked in Pensacola. They were easily defeated and forced to surrender. However, the missionaries and soldiers in Texas returned to Coahuila, fearing French advances. The viceroy sent the Marquis of San Miguel de Aguayo and 500 militiamen to expel the French from the Bay of Espíritu Santo, where they were established. Aguayo was named governor of Florida and Texas.

Zúñiga also worked to dislodge the French from Española, where they were well established, and the Danish from the Virgin Islands.

On December 21, 1720, the system of convoys was established to transport tribute and merchandise to Spain. On that date a fleet of merchant ships escorted by ships of war sailed from Veracruz to the Canary Islands. From the Canaries, another fleet escorted the merchant ships to Seville.

== Later career and death ==
For the marriage of the Prince of Asturias to the Princess of Orléans, Viceroy Zúñiga was named majordomo of the palace in Madrid. To take up that position, he turned over the government of New Spain to his successor, Juan de Acuña, marqués de Casafuerte. On Zúñiga's return to Spain, he became president of the Council of the Indies. He died in Madrid in 1727. In accordance with his will, his heart was sent to the Capuchin convent of Corpus Christi, which he had founded in Mexico City, where it was preserved.

== Notes ==
Spanish nobility
Preceded by New creation	Duke of Arión; 1725–1727	Succeeded by Manuela de Zúñiga
