= José de Azlor y Virto de Vera =

10th Governor of Texas and 12th of Coahuila
- In office 1719–1722
- Preceded by: Martín de Alarcón
- Succeeded by: Blas de la Garza Falcón (Coahuila) / Fernando Pérez de Almazán (Texas)

Personal details
- Profession: Political leader, rancher

José de Azlor y Virto de Vera, second Marquis of San Miguel de Aguayo by marriage (born c. 1677 – died 9 March 1734), commonly known as the Marqués de Aguayo, was the governor of the provinces of Coahuila and of the New Philippines in New Spain between 1719 and 1722. During his tenure, Aguayo retook eastern Texas from New France without firing a shot. He established or reestablished seven missions and three presidios, and quadrupled the number of Spanish soldiers stationed in Texas. Aguayo and his wife were also owners of a very large estate, or latifundio, in Coahuila. His descendants inherited and expanded the landholdings. The Aguayo dynasty continued until 1825.

== Personal life ==
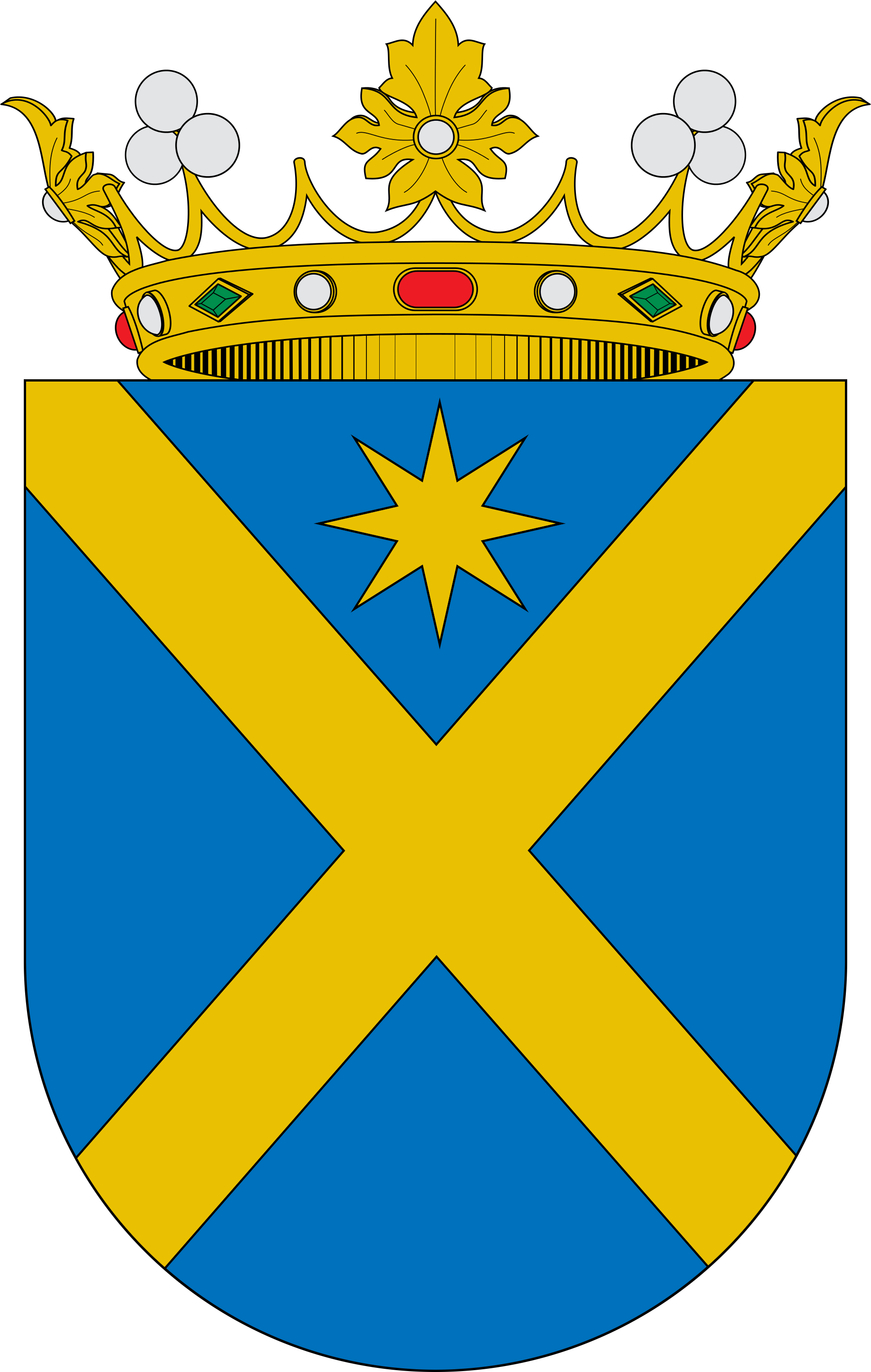
Arms of the Marquises of Aguayo

Aguayo was descended from a noble Spanish family from Aragon. He married Ignacia Javiera de Echeverz y Subiza (1673-1733), heiress to the first Marquis of Aguayo, thereby he himself becoming the second Marquis de San Miguel de Aguayo upon his father in law's passing in 1699. In 1712 the couple moved from Spain to Coahuila to manage her inherited land which was one of the largest latifundios in all of the Americas. The couple established their headquarters in San Francisco de los Patos (since 1892 called General Cepeda). Aguayo expanded the family's land holdings and gained control of many of the scarce water sources in the Chihuahua Desert of Coahuila. He obtained ownership of the sources of water near the village of Parras, and sold water to the farmers in the area. Parras was prominent for its irrigated vineyards and large production of wine and brandy. The first winery in the Americas was in Parras.

== Governorship ==
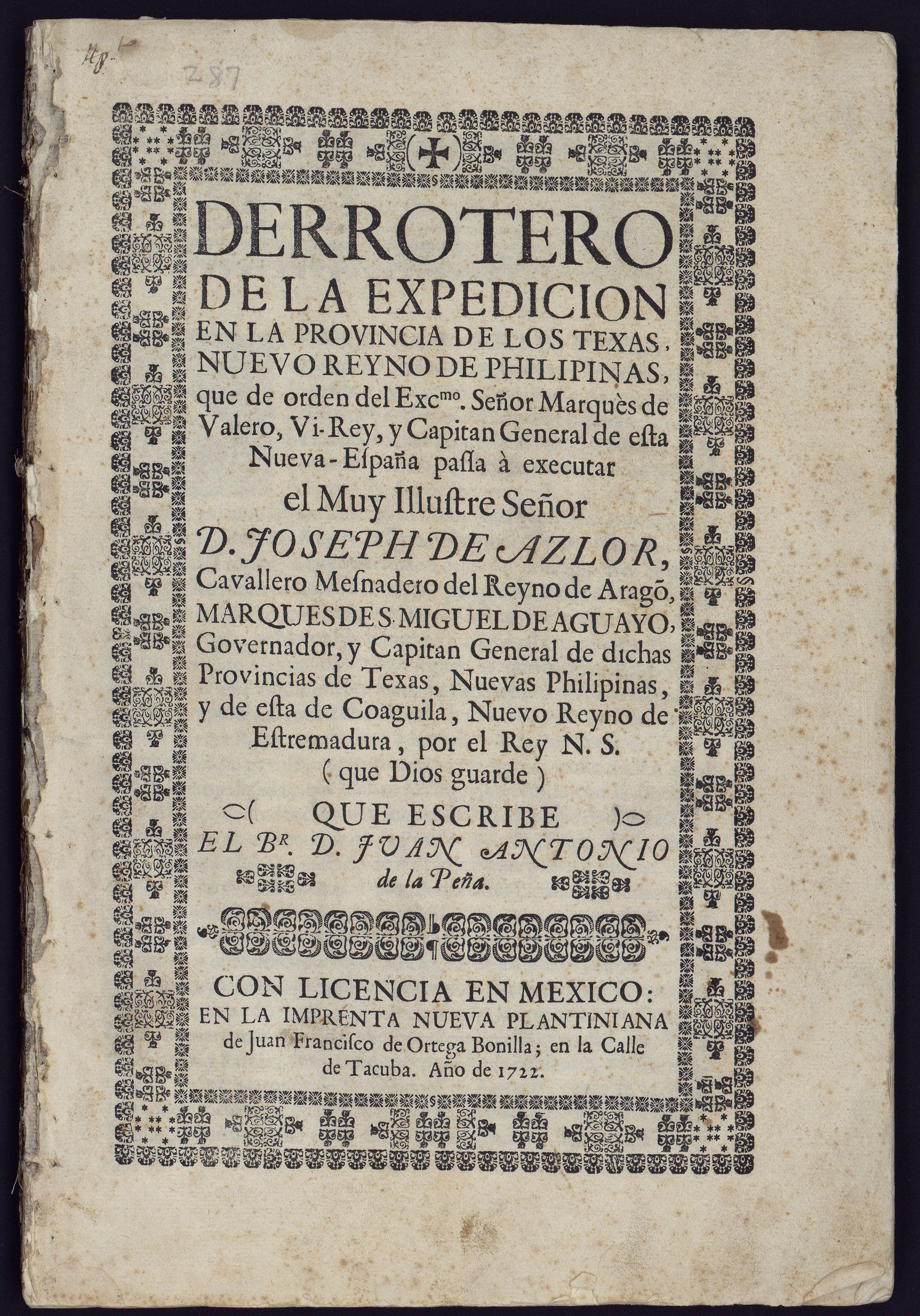
Juan Antonio de la Peña chronicled the Marquis de Aguayo's 1720-1722 expedition to the "Land of the Texans" in the "Nuevo Reyno de Philipinas"

During the War of the Quadruple Alliance, Great Britain and France, who were aligned together against Spain, attempted to take over Spanish interests in North America. In June 1719, seven Frenchmen from Natchitoches, Louisiana took control of the eastern Texas mission of San Miguel de los Adaes from its sole defender, who did not know that the countries were at war. The French soldiers said that 100 additional soldiers were coming, and the Spanish colonists, missionaries, and remaining soldiers abandoned the area and fled to San Antonio.

That year, the viceroy of New Spain appointed Aguayo governor of the provinces of Coahuila and Texas. He had volunteered to use his own money to reconquer Texas and raised an army of 500 soldiers. The governorship confirmed at Aranjuez by the king in May 1721, Aguayo replied back with gratitude that "the restoration of Texas, New Kingdom of the Philippines, should have been entrusted to my feeble management."

Having to address Indian troubles in Coahuila, a devastating drought that killed more than 80% of the horses he had purchased for the expedition, and subsequent torrential rains, Aguayo was unable to depart until late 1720. Just before he departed, the fighting in Europe halted. Felipe V ordered Aguayo not to invade French Louisiana, but to find a way to retake eastern Texas without using force.

The expedition took along more than 2800 horses, 6400 sheep, and many goats; this constituted the first large "cattle" drive in Texas, greatly increased the number of domesticated animals in the region, and marked the beginning of Spanish ranching in Texas.

In July 1721, while approaching the Neches River, Aguayo's expedition met Louis St. Denis, commander of the French forces in the area, who was leading a raid with the objective of taking control of the Spanish mission at San Antonio de Bexar. Realizing that he was badly outnumbered, St. Denis agreed to abandon eastern Texas and return to Louisiana. Aguayo ordered the building of a new Spanish fort, Nuestra Señora del Pilar de los Adaes, located near present-day Robeline, Louisiana, only 12 mi (19 km) from the French settlement at Natchitoches. The new fort became the first capital of Spanish Texas; it was guarded by 6 cannon and 100 soldiers.

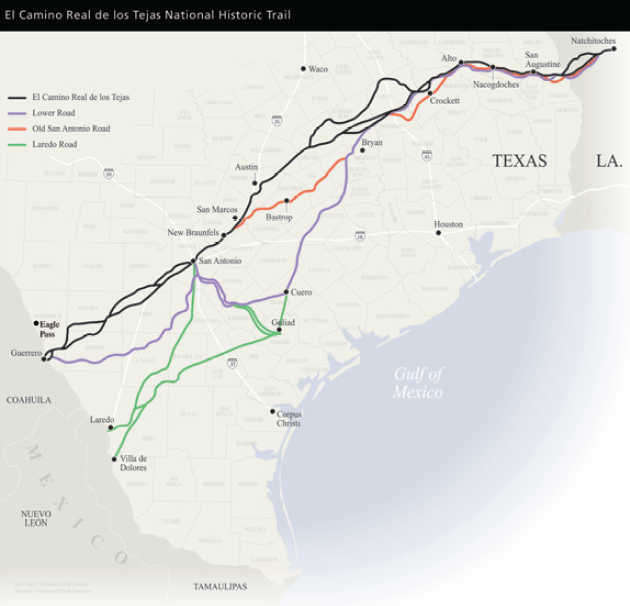
Spanish routes through northern New Spain. Note the map on which the route is superimposed is anachronistic: the province of New Philippines was north of the Nueces river, near Corpus Christi; the Louisiana border was 45 miles further east, at the Rio Hondo

The six eastern Tejas missions were reopened, and Presidio Dolores, now known as Presidio de los Tejas, was moved from the Neches River to a site near mission Purísima Concepción near the Angelina River. The Spaniards then built another fort, Presidio Nuestra Señora de Loreto de la Bahía, known as La Bahía, on the site of the former French Fort Saint Louis. Nearby they established a mission, Espíritu Santo de Zúñiga (also known as La Bahía), for the Coco, Karankawa, and Cujane Indians. Ninety men were left to staff the garrison.

On 13 June 1722, having returned to Mexico City from the expedition, Aguayo resigned from the governorship of Coahuila and Texas. At the beginning of his expedition, Texas had consisted only of San Antonio and approximately 60 soldiers; at his resignation the province had grown to consist of 4 presidios, over 250 soldiers, 10 missions, and the small civilian town of San Antonio. The Aguayo expedition strengthened the Spanish claim to Texas which the French never again disputed.

== Death and legacy ==
In 1724, Aguayo was honored by the Spanish king with a promotion to Field Marshal. Aguayo died on 9 March 1734. Aguayo's daughter, the Marchioness of Aguayo married into another large landholding family in 1735 and she gained title to additional lands. In the 1760s the Aguayo landholdings totaled 5,944,278 hectares (22,950.99 sq mi) and their herds of sheep were estimated to number more than 200,000. Their headquarters at Patos had a population of 1,200. The Aguayos themselves were absentee landlords, living in Mexico City as did many large landowners with holdings in the Mexican hinterland.

Mismanagement and the hazards of raising livestock in a drought-prone region drove the Aguayo family to sell much of their property to English investors in 1825. The Sánchez Navarro family acquired the entire Aguayo estate in 1840 and thus became the largest landowners in all of the Americas.

== Bibliography ==
- Chipman, Donald E. (1992), Spanish Texas, 1519–1821, Austin, TX: University of Texas Press, ISBN 0-292-77659-4
- Weber, David J. (1992), The Spanish Frontier in North America, Yale Western Americana Series, New Haven, CT: Yale University Press, ISBN 0-300-05198-0
- Harris III, Charles H. (1975), A Mexican Family Empire, Austin, TX: University of Texas Press, pp. 6–9, 107
- Jose Vasconcelos "Evaristo Madero: Biografia de un Patricio" (Impressiones Modernas, 1954); Rafael Heliodoro Valle, "The History of Wine in Mexico" American Journal of Enology and Viticulture Vol. 9, No. 3, (1958); Pablo Lacoste "La vid y el vino en América del Sur: El desplazamiento de los polos vitivinícolas (Siglos XVI Al XX)." Revista Universum Vol. 2, no. No. 19 (2004): 62–93.
- DeLay, Brian (2008), War of a Thousand Deserts, New Haven, CT: Yale University Press, p. 52
