= Fernando Pérez de Almazán =

Spanish emissary and governor

11th Governor of the Spanish Colony of Texas
- In office 1722–1727
- Preceded by: José de Azlor y Virto de Vera
- Succeeded by: Melchor de Mediavilla y Azcona

Personal details
- Profession: Political

Fernando Pérez de Almazán, was a Spanish emissary who served as the first governor of Texas as a politically independent province from Coahuila (1722–1727).

== Early life ==
Fernando Perez de Almazan was born in the early eighteenth century, but his place of birth is unknown. In the Aguayo expedition he became emissary of the French commander in the city of Natchitoches (then belonging to Texas, currently within Louisiana), when France intended to invade the area.

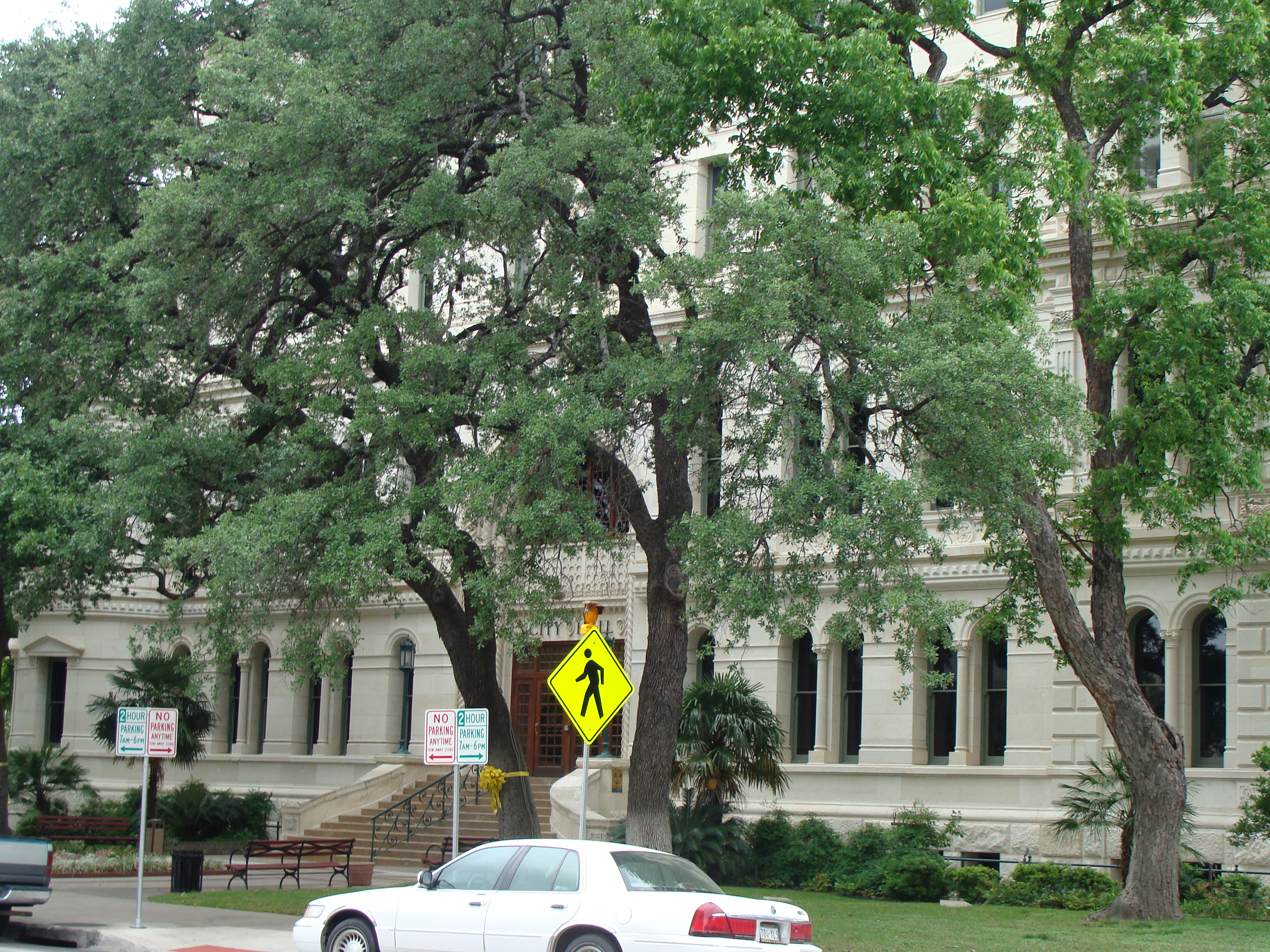
Spanish Governor's Palace entrance showing building exterior

== Career ==
In 1721, Fernando Perez de Almazan and Captain Gabriel Costales came to Natchitoches to meet with the commander of the French fort and explain his intention to occupy Los Adaes (which had been Spanish, then taken and later abandoned by the French). The expedition could take back the area and create a better fortress to protect the site from new invasions from outside French boundaries. After a discussion between the French commander and Spanish major representatives, they decided they could restore and fortify the border wherever they saw fit. They decided to establish the presidio near Natchitoches.

In 1722, he was appointed governor of Texas, after the former governor of Texas and Coahuila, José de Azlor y Virto de Vera, proposed that Coahuila and Texas had its own governors in 1720. After assuming the position of governor, Pérez de Almazán became Los Adaes in the Texas capital.

Possibly as early as 1722 the Spanish Governor's Palace was built in San Antonio.

In 1724, East Texas suffered significant crop losses, which prompted Almazán to travel to San Antonio looking other supplies. Because the river into the city was difficult to navigate, he put rafts at river crossings. After collecting supplies in 1725, the governor was sick. He stayed in San Antonio and appointed Melchor de Mediavilla y Azcona as lieutenant governor. However, between 1727 and 1729, Pérez de Almazán's health worsened and he was forced to resign, making Mediavilla y Azcona the new governor of Texas.

In 1729, he was in Mexico City.
