= Spanish Texas =

Province of New Spain

Spanish Texas refers to the period of Spanish claim, exploration, and colonial administration in the region that became Texas, within the Viceroyalty of New Spain, from 1519 until 1821. During the later colonial period, Texas was associated with the interior provinces. Spanish slave-raiding expeditions into what became Texas began in the 16th century and contributed to conflict and distrust between Spaniards and Native American peoples. Spain did not attempt to establish a permanent settlement in Texas until after France established the colony of Fort Saint Louis in 1685. In 1688, the French colony collapsed amid internal dissension and attacks by the Karankawa. In 1690, responding to concerns about French encroachment, Spanish explorer Alonso de León escorted several Catholic missionaries to east Texas, where they established the first mission in Texas.

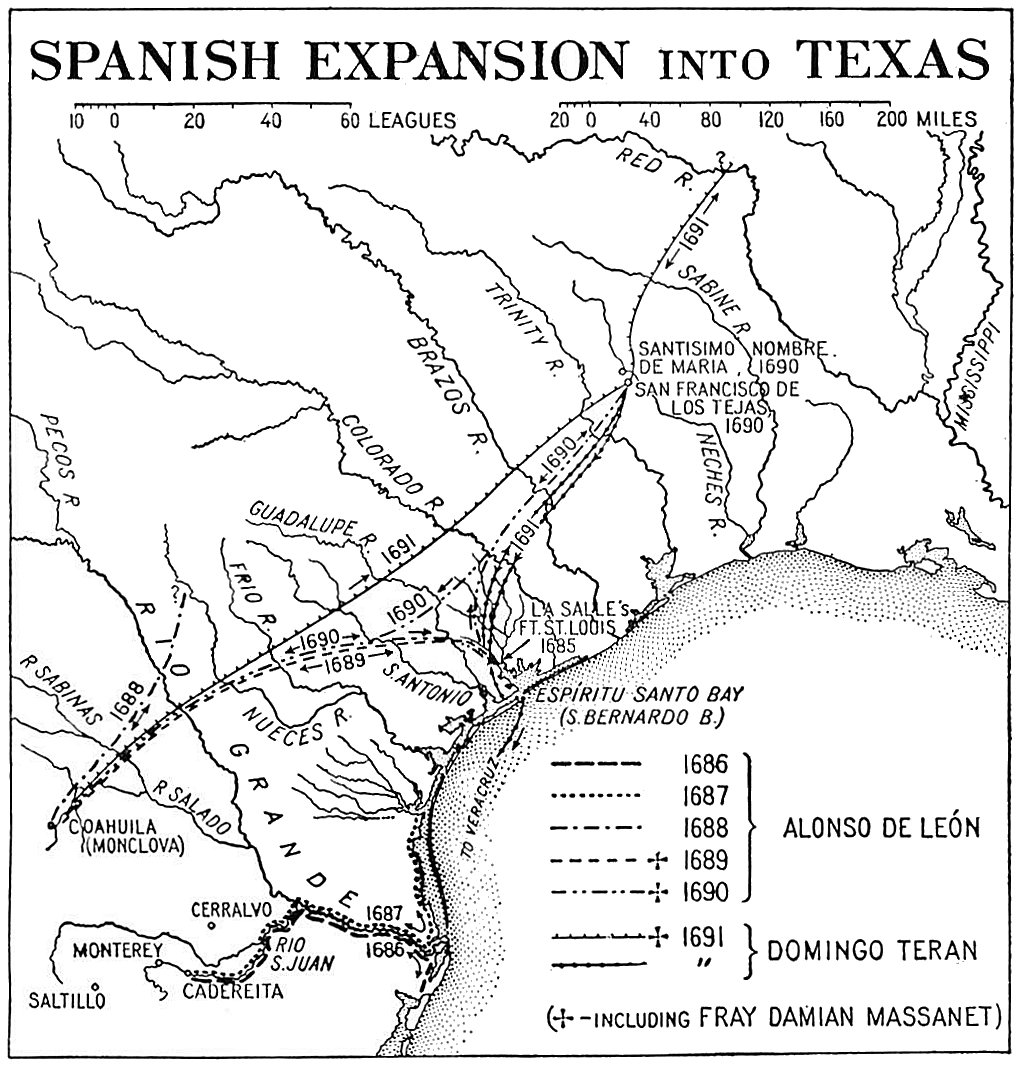
Trails taken by Spanish explorers from Mexico into Texas

In 1716, the Spanish began establishing several additional missions and a presidio to maintain a buffer between Spanish territory and the Louisiana district of New France. San Antonio began as a Spanish mission and presidio complex in 1718 and later became the capital and largest settlement of Texas. Until the early 18th century, Spanish-administered Texas was associated with Nueva Extremadura, New Spain. The name New Philippines was later used for Texas, especially for the area north and east of the Medina and Nueces rivers, although the name gradually declined in use in favor of Texas. Spanish authority remained concentrated mainly around missions, presidios, ranches, and settlements.

Relations between the Spanish colony and the Lipan Apache were marked by conflict until 1749, when Spanish officials and Lipan leaders concluded a peace treaty. Spanish, Lipan Apache, and other communities were then affected by Comanche raids until 1785, when Spanish officials and Comanche leaders negotiated a peace agreement. After the Louisiana Purchase in 1803, the United States asserted claims to an imprecisely defined area that included parts of Texas. The introduction of European diseases during colonial contact contributed to severe declines in Native American populations, one of several forces that reshaped settlement patterns in the region. The grazing of European livestock contributed to the spread of mesquite inland, replacing some native grasslands, while Spanish farmers introduced tillage and irrigation practices that also changed the landscape. During the Mexican War of Independence from 1810 to 1821, Texas experienced political and military upheaval. Reaching a maximum population of perhaps 5,000 Spanish, mixed-ancestry, and mission-affiliated Native residents in 1810, only about 2,500 people remained in Hispanic Texas by the end of the war. Mexico gained its independence from Spain in 1821, and Spanish Texas became part of independent Mexico. Texas became independent of Mexico in 1836 and joined the United States in 1845.

Spanish influence in Texas is significant and Spanish architectural concepts continued to shape the built environment. Many cities and rivers in Texas were named by Spaniards, and many counties in southern and western Texas have majority-Hispanic populations. Many Spanish legal practices still survive, including the concepts of a homestead exemption and community property.

== Location ==
Spanish Texas (Tejas) was a colonial province within the northeastern mainland region of the Viceroyalty of New Spain. On its southern edge, Tejas was bordered by the provinces of Coahuila and Nuevo Santander. The boundary between the provinces was set at the line formed by the Medina River and the Nueces River, 100 miles (161 km) northeast of the Rio Grande. On the east, Texas bordered La Louisiane (French Louisiana). Although Spain claimed that the Red River formed the boundary between the two, France insisted that the border was the Sabine River, 45 miles (72 km) to the west.

== Initial colonization attempts ==
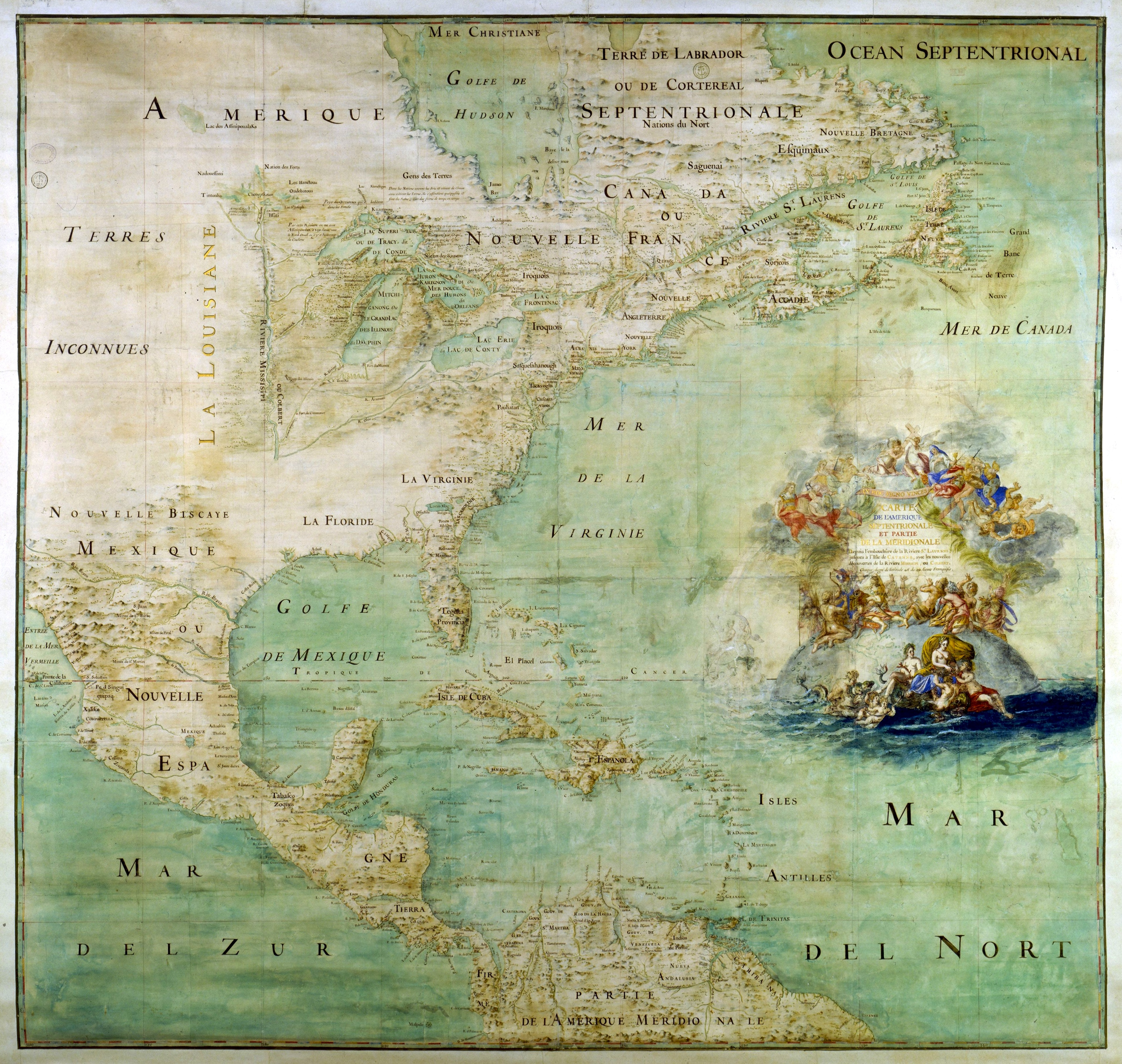
This 1681 map of North America lists the Rio Grande as Rio Bravo, and shows the lack of information Europeans had of the area that is now Texas.

Although Alonso Álvarez de Pineda claimed Texas for Spain in 1519, the area was largely ignored by Spain until the late seventeenth century. (Note: Spaniard Cabeza de Vaca and three companions wandered lost along the Texas Gulf Coast and the Rio Grande between 1528 and 1535 trying to find their way back to a Spanish settlement after they survived the ill-fated Narváez expedition in Florida. De Vaca made the first contact with Indians in Texas in November 1528. Chipman (1992), p. 11.) However Spanish slave raids into what became Texas began in the late 16th century. Among others, Spanish governor Luis de Carvajal y de la Cueva captured hundreds of Indians and sold them to owners of silver mines in Mexico. Frequent epidemics of European diseases reduced the Indian population. The first epidemic, possibly of cholera, among the Indians in Texas was recorded in 1528 by Cabeza de Vaca and they continued to impact the Indian population until the end of the 19th century.

In 1685, the Spanish learned that France had established a colony in the area between New Spain and Florida. Believing the French colony was a threat to Spanish mines and shipping routes, Spanish King Carlos II's Council of War recommended that "Spain needed swift action 'to remove this thorn which has been thrust into the heart of America. The greater the delay the greater the difficulty of attainment.'" Having no idea where to find the French colony, the Spanish launched ten expeditions—both land and sea—over the next three years. While unable to fulfill their original goal of locating the French settlement, the expeditions did provide Spain a deeper understanding of the geography of the Gulf Coast region. The last expedition, in 1689, discovered a French deserter living in southern Texas with the Coahuiltecans. In April 1689, the Frenchman helped guide the Spanish, under Alonso de León, to Fort Saint Louis, which had been destroyed by Karankawa Indians. De León's expedition also met representatives of the Caddo people, who lived between the Trinity and the Red Rivers. The Caddo expressed interest in learning about Christianity.

De León sent a report of his findings to Mexico City, where it "created instant optimism and quickened religious fervor". The Spanish government was convinced that the destruction of the French fort was "proof of God's 'divine aid and favor'". In his report de León recommended that presidios be established along the Rio Grande, the Frio River, and the Guadalupe River and that missions be established among the Hasinai Indians, whom the Spanish called the Tejas, in East Texas. In Castilian Spanish, this was often written as the phonetic equivalent Texas, which became the name of the future province.

=== Missions ===
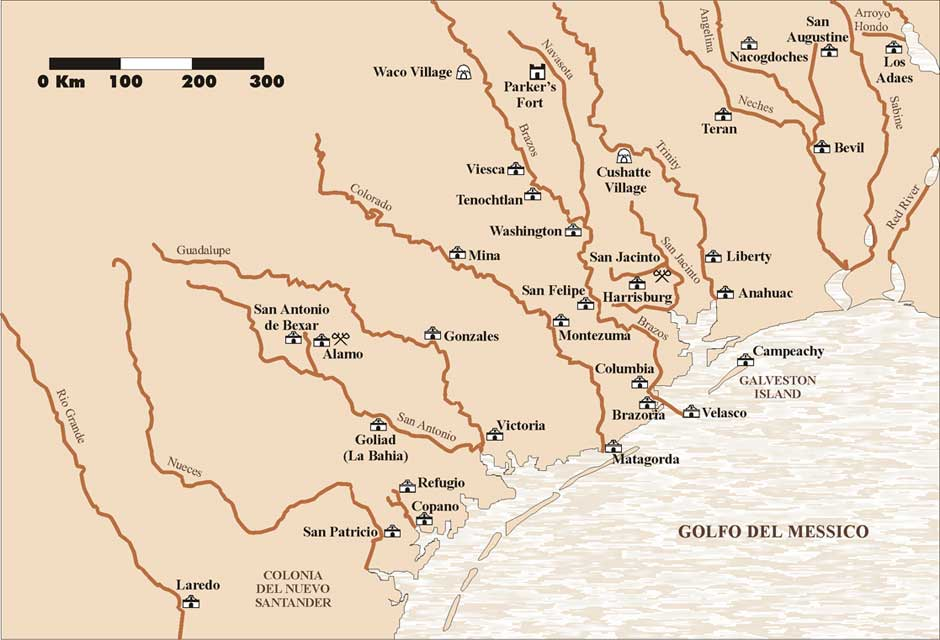
Missions in Spanish Texas at the beginning of the Spanish colonization in the area

The viceroy approved the establishment of a mission but rejected the idea of presidios, primarily because New Spain was chronically short of funds. On March 26, 1690, Alonso de León set out with 110 soldiers and several missionaries. The group stopped first to burn Fort Saint Louis to the ground, and then they proceeded to East Texas. Mission San Francisco de los Tejas was completed near the Hasinai village of Nabedaches in late May, and its first mass was conducted on June 1. The missionaries refused to allow the unruly soldiers to remain near the missions, and when de León returned to Mexico later that year, only 3 of his initial 110 soldiers remained to assist the monks. Father Damián Massanet, the priest in charge of the mission, left on June 2 to meet the tribes north of the mission before returning to Mexico to request an additional 14 priests and 7 lay brothers.

On January 23, 1691, Spain appointed the first governor of Texas, General Domingo Terán de los Ríos. Terán was ordered to help establish seven new missions, including two more among the Tejas Indians, four amongst the Kadohadachos, and one for the tribes near the Guadalupe River. He was only able to recruit 10 friars and 3 lay brothers. His expedition reached the existing mission in August, 1691 and discovered that the priests there had established a second mission, Santísimo Nombre de María, five miles (8.0 km) east of San Francisco de los Tejas. One of the priests had died, leaving two to operate the missions. The Indians regularly stole their cattle and horses and were becoming insolent. With provisions running low, Terán chose not to establish any more missions. When he left Texas later that year, most of the missionaries chose to return with him, leaving only 3 religious people and 9 soldiers at the missions.

The group also left a smallpox epidemic. The Indians had no natural immunity to the disease and at first blamed the outbreak on the baptismal waters. After thousands of natives had succumbed, the survivors rose up against the missions. In 1693, the Caddo warned the Franciscan missionaries to leave the area or be killed. The missionaries buried the church bells and burned the mission, then returned to Mexico. Although this first Spanish attempt to settle Texas failed, it provided Spain an increased awareness of the terrain, rivers, and coastline of Texas and convinced the government that "even the most tractable of Indians" could only be converted "by a combination of coercion and persuasion". For the next 20 years, Spain again ignored Texas.

== Conflict with France ==
During the early eighteenth century, France again provided the impetus for Spain's interest in Texas. In 1699, French forts were established at Biloxi Bay and on the Mississippi River, ending Spain's exclusive control of the Gulf Coast. Although Spain "refused to concede France's right to be in Louisiana" and warned King Louis XIV that he could be excommunicated for ignoring the 200-year-old papal edict giving the Americas to Spain, they took no further actions to stop France's encroachment or expand the Spanish presence. The two countries became allies during the War of the Spanish Succession and cooperated in the Americas. Despite their friendship, Spain remained unwilling to allow the French to trade within their territory. On hearing rumors of French incursions into Texas in 1707, the viceroy of New Spain ordered all provincial governors to prevent the entry of foreigners and their goods. To dissuade the Tejas Indians from accepting goods from the French, a contingent of soldiers under Pedro de Aguirre traveled into Texas. His expedition reached only as far as the Colorado River and turned around after learning that the Tejas chief was still unhappy with the Spanish. The group did visit the area around the San Antonio River, and was much impressed with the land and availability of water. They believed the river to be unnamed and called it San Antonio de Padua, not realizing that Terán and Massanet had camped nearby years before on the feast day of Saint Anthony of Padua and had given the river the same name.

In 1711, Franciscan missionary Francisco Hidalgo, who had served in the earlier Texas missions, wanted to reestablish missions with the Caddos. The Spanish government was unwilling to provide the funding and troops for the project, so Hidalgo approached the French governor of Louisiana, Antoine de la Mothe Cadillac for help. Cadillac was under orders to turn Louisiana into a profitable colony and believed that Spanish settlers closer to Louisiana could provide new trading opportunities. He sent Louis Juchereau de St. Denis, along with brothers Pierre and Robert Talon, who, as children, had been spared at the massacre of Fort Saint Louis, to find Hidalgo and offer assistance. In July 1714, the French delegation reached the Spanish frontier, at that time around the Rio Grande, where Hidalgo was located. Although St. Denis was arrested and questioned, he was ultimately released. The Spanish recognized that the French could become a threat to other Spanish areas, and ordered the reoccupation of Texas as a buffer between French settlements in Louisiana and New Spain.

On April 12, 1716, an expedition led by Domingo Ramón left San Juan Bautista for Texas, intending to establish four missions and a presidio which would be guarded by twenty-five soldiers. The party of 75 people included 3 children, 7 women, 18 soldiers, and 10 missionaries. These were the first recorded female settlers in Spanish Texas. After marrying a Spanish woman, St. Denis also joined the Spanish expedition.

The party reached the land of the Hasinai people in late June 1716 and was greeted warmly. On July 3, mission San Francisco was reestablished as Mission Nuestro Padre San Francisco de los Tejas for the Neche Indians. Several days later, Mission Nuestra Señora de la Purísima Concepción was established at the main village of the Hainai, the head tribe of the Hasinai Confederacy, along the Angelina River. A third mission, Nuestra Señora de Guadalupe, was established 15 miles (24 km) east of Purísima Concepción, at the main village of the Nacogdoche tribe, at what is now Nacogdoches. A final mission, San José de los Nazonis, was built among the Nazoni Indians just north of present-day Cushing. A presidio, Nuestra Señora de los Dolores, was built opposite San Francisco de los Tejas.

During this period, the area was named the New Philippines by the missionaries in the twin hopes of gaining royal patronage, and that the Spanish efforts would be as successful as in the Philippines a century and a half earlier. The alternate name became official and remained in use for several decades, but had virtually disappeared from use (in favor of 'Texas') by the end of the century. The name however persisted in documents, especially in land grants

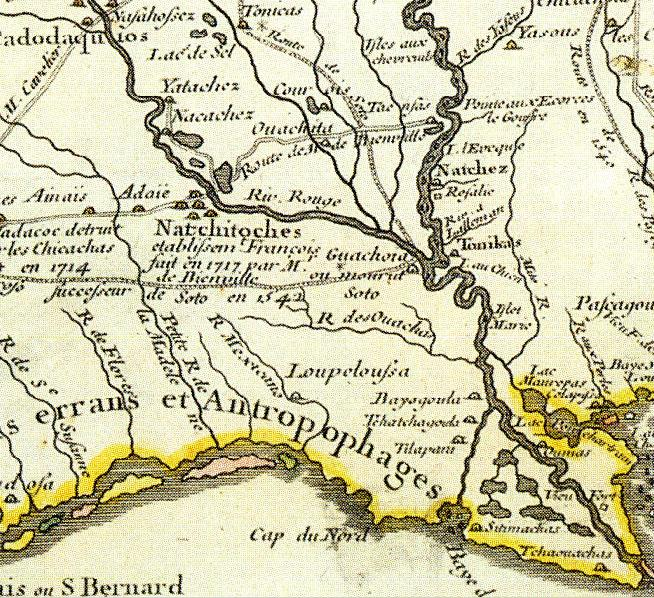
The first map to depict an Adaes (Adaie) settlement, shown to the west of a cluster of Natchitoches villages, was drawn in 1718 by Guillaume Delisle.

At the same time, the French were building a fort in Natchitoches to establish a more westward presence. The Spanish countered by founding two more missions just west of Natchitoches, San Miguel de los Adaes and Dolores de los Ais. The missions were located in a disputed area; France claimed the Sabine River to be the western boundary of Louisiana, while Spain claimed the Red River was the eastern boundary of Texas, leaving an overlap of 45 miles (72 km).

The new missions were over 400 miles (640 km) from the nearest Spanish settlement, San Juan Bautista. It was difficult to reprovision the missions, and by 1718 the missionaries were in dire straits. Martín de Alarcón, who had been appointed governor of Texas in late 1716, wished to establish a way station between the settlements along the Rio Grande and the new missions in East Texas. The Coahuiltecans had built a thriving community near the headwaters of the San Antonio River, in the area the Spanish had admired in 1707. Alarcón led a group of 72 people, including 10 families, into Texas on April 9, 1718. They brought with them 548 horses, 6 droves of mules, and other livestock. On May 1, the group created a temporary mud, brush and straw structure to serve as a mission, San Antonio de Valero, whose chapel was later known as the Alamo. The mission was initially populated with three to five Indians that one of the missionaries had raised since childhood. Alarcon built a presidio, San Antonio de Béxar one mile (1.6 km) north of the mission,. Alarcón also chartered the municipality of Béjar, now San Antonio. Given a status higher than a village (pueblo) but lower than a city (ciudad), San Antonio became the only villa in Texas, and the colonists who settled there relied on farming and ranching to survive. With the new settlement established, Alarcón continued on to the East Texas missions, where he found evidence of much illicit trade with France.

The following year, the War of the Quadruple Alliance broke out, aligning Spain against France, Great Britain, the Dutch Republic, and Austria. The war was fought primarily over Italy, but Great Britain and France launched several attempts to capture Spanish colonies in North America. In June 1719, 7 Frenchmen from Natchitoches took control of Mission San Miguel de los Adaes from its sole defender, who did not know that the countries were at war. The French soldiers explained that 100 additional soldiers were coming, and the Spanish colonists, missionaries, and remaining soldiers abandoned the area and fled to San Antonio.

The Marquis of San Miguel de Aguayo volunteered to reconquer Texas and raised an army of 500 soldiers. Aguayo was named the governor of Coahuila and Texas and the responsibilities of his office delayed his trip to Texas by a year, until late 1720. Just before he departed, the fighting in Europe halted, and King Felipe V of Spain ordered them not to invade Louisiana, but instead find a way to retake Eastern Texas without using force. The expedition brought with them over 2,800 horses, 6,400 sheep and many goats; this constituted the first large "cattle drive" in Texas. This greatly increased the number of domesticated animals in Texas and marked the beginning of Spanish ranching in Texas.

In July 1721, while approaching the Neches River, Aguayo's expedition met St. Denis, who had returned to the French and was leading a raid on San Antonio. Realizing that he was badly outnumbered, St. Denis agreed to abandon East Texas and return to Louisiana. Aguayo then ordered the building of a new Spanish fort Nuestra Señora del Pilar de los Adaes, located near present-day Robeline, Louisiana, only 12 miles (19 km) from Natchitoches. The new fort became the first capital of Texas, and was guarded by 6 cannon and 100 soldiers. The six East Texas missions were reopened, and Presidio Dolores, now known as Presidio de los Tejas, was moved from the Neches River to a site near mission Purísima Concepción near the Angelina River. The Spaniards then built another fort, Presidio La Bahía del Espíritu Santo, known as La Bahía, on the site of the former French Fort St. Louis. Nearby they established a mission, Espíritu Santo de Zúñiga (also known as La Bahía), for the Coco, Karankawa, and Cujane Indians. Ninety men were left at the garrison. Aguayo returned to Mexico City in 1722 and resigned his governorship. At the beginning of his expedition, Texas had consisted only of San Antonio and about 60 soldiers; at his resignation, the province had grown to consist of 4 presidios, over 250 soldiers, 10 missions, and the small civilian town of San Antonio.

== Settlement difficulties ==
Shortly after Aguayo returned to Mexico, the new viceroy of New Spain, Juan de Acuña, marqués de Casafuerte, was ordered to cut costs accrued for the defense of the northern part of the territory. Acuña appointed Colonel Pedro de Rivera y Villalón to inspect the entire northern frontier. Beginning in what is now California in November 1724, Rivera spent the next three years inspecting the northern frontier, reaching San Antonio in August 1727. His reports of Los Adaes, Presidio Nuestra Señora de Loreto, and the presidio at San Antonio were favorable, but he was unimpressed with Presidio de los Tejas, whose 25 soldiers were guarding empty missions. The native population had refused to congregate into communities around the missions and refused baptism unless they were on the brink of death. Because the Indians were well-armed, the Franciscans were unable to compel them to join the missions. The frustrated missionaries finally petitioned the Spanish government for 50 soldiers to burn the Indians' houses of worship and force them to build homes near the missions. No troops were forthcoming.

Rivera recommended closing Presidio de los Tejas and reducing the number of soldiers at the other presidios. His suggestions were approved in 1729, and 125 troops were removed from Texas, leaving only 144 soldiers divided among Los Adaes, La Bahía, and San Antonio. The three East Texas missions which had depended on Presidio de los Tejas were relocated along the San Antonio River in May 1731, increasing the number of missions in the San Antonio area to five. The San Antonio missions usually contained fewer than 300 Indians. Many of those who lived at the mission had nowhere else to go, and belonged to small tribes that have since become extinct.

The Spanish government believed that settlers would defend their property, alleviating the need for some of the presidios. Texas was an unappealing prospect for most settlers, however, due to the armed nomadic tribes, high costs, and lack of precious metals. In 1731, the Spanish government resettled 55 people, mostly women and children, from the Canary Islands to San Antonio. At that time, only 300 Hispanic settlers lived in San Antonio, with 200 others dispersed throughout the rest of the colony. The new immigrants began farming and renamed the town San Fernando de Béxar, establishing the first municipal, and only civilian, government in Texas. Juan Leal Goraz, the oldest of the settlers, was appointed the first councilman.

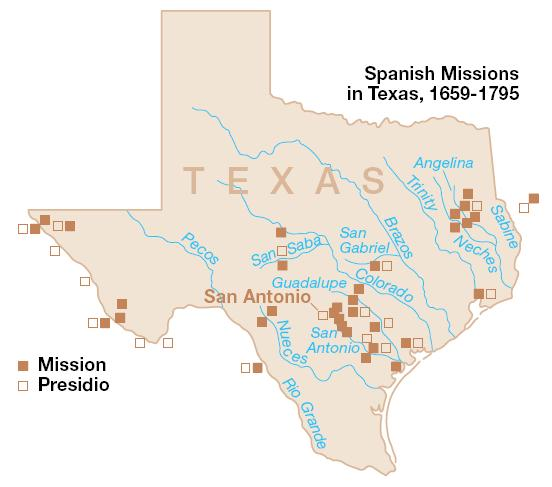
Spanish missions within the boundaries of what is now the state of Texas. Land north of the missions was controlled by the Comanche, Apache, Wichita, and Caddo confederacy.

As the first settlers of the municipality, the Islanders and their descendants were designated hidalgos. The established settlers resented the Islanders for their new titles and exclusive privileges within the city government. The newcomers did not know how to handle horses, rendering them useless in mounted warfare against the Apaches. Unlike the established settlers, who relied on ranching, the Islanders were primarily farmers, and their refusal to build fences led to many disagreements when livestock trampled the fields. By the early 1740s, however, intermarriage and the need for closer economic ties had helped to alleviate some of the infighting, and the original settlers were given permission to serve as magistrates and council members.

Spain discouraged manufacturing in its colonies and limited trade to Spanish goods handled by Spanish merchants and carried on Spanish vessels. Most of the ports, including all of those in Texas, were closed to commercial vessels in the hopes of dissuading smugglers. By law, all goods bound for Texas had to be shipped to Veracruz and then transported over the mountains to Mexico City before being sent to Texas. This caused the goods to be very expensive in the Texas settlements. Settlers were often forced to turn to the French for supplies, as the fort at Natchitoches was well-stocked and goods did not have to travel as far. Without many goods to trade, however, the remaining Spanish missionaries and colonists had little to offer the Indians, who remained loyal to the French traders.

== Peace with France ==
Map of New France (blue color) in 1750, before the French and Indian War

Indians confirmed in 1746 that French traders periodically arrived by sea to trade with tribes in the lower Trinity River region. Eight years later, the Spanish learned of rumors that the French had opened a trading post at the mouth of the Trinity River. In September 1754, the governor, Jacinto de Barrios y Jáuregui sent soldiers to investigate, and they captured five Frenchmen who had been living at an Indian village. To dissuade the French from returning, Spain built the presidio of San Agustín de Ahumada and the mission of Nuestra Señora de la Luz de Orcoquisac near the mouth of the Trinity at Galveston Bay. Conditions were awful at the new location, and both the presidio and the mission were closed in 1770.

The Presidio La Bahía was moved from the Guadalupe River to Goliad on the San Antonio River in 1749. Within five years, a new mission for the Karankawa tribes, Nuestra Señora del Rosario de los Cuhanes, was built upstream of the presidio. This mission survived for many years. Despite the new missions and presidios, Texas was one of the least populated provinces on the northern frontier of New Spain. By 1760, almost 1,200 Hispanic people lived in Texas, with half in San Antonio, 350 at Los Adaes, and 260 at La Bahía. Other Spaniards lived in what is now the El Paso area, but that was considered part of New Mexico and not part of Texas.

On November 3, 1762, as part of the Treaty of Fontainebleau, France ceded the portion of Louisiana west of the Mississippi River to Spain. Spain had assisted France against Britain in the Seven Years' War, and lost both Manila and Havana to the British. Although the Louisiana colony was a financial liability, King Carlos III of Spain reluctantly accepted it, as that meant France was finally ceding its claim to Texas. At the Treaty of Paris on February 10, 1763, Great Britain recognized Spain's right to the lands west of the Mississippi. Great Britain received the remainder of France's North American territories, and Spain exchanged some of their holdings in Florida for Havana.

San Antonio de Béxar Population
| Year | Population |
|---|---|
| 1740 | 437–560 |
| 1762 | 514–661 |
| 1770 | 860 |
| 1777 | 1,351 |
| 1780 | 1,463 |

With France no longer a threat to Spain's North American interests, the Spanish monarchy commissioned the Marquis of Rubí to inspect all of the presidios on the northern frontier of New Spain and make recommendations for the future. Rubí's two-year journey, beginning in early 1766, covered seven thousand miles (11,000 km) from the Gulf of California to East Texas. This was the first comprehensive look at the New Spain frontier since the 1720s, when Pedro de Rivera conducted his expedition. Rubí was unimpressed with the presidio at San Saba, which he declared to be the worst in the kingdom of New Spain. He recommended that only the presidios at San Antonio and La Bahía be maintained, and that East Texas be totally abandoned, with all population moving to San Antonio. With Louisiana in Spanish control, there was no need for Los Adaes to reside so closely to Natchitoches, especially after the missions had relocated to San Antonio. In August 1768, the acting governor, Juan María Vicencio, Baron of Ripperdà, moved his headquarters and the garrison to San Antonio, and in 1772 San Antonio became the new Texas capital. Los Adaes was abandoned completely. The new governor also augmented the garrison at San Antonio to protect the town from recurring Indian attacks. A new presidio, Fuerte de Santa Cruz de Cibolo, was also established 40 miles (64 km) southeast of San Antonio to protect farmers and ranchers from attacks.

As a result of Rubí's recommendations, Presidio de San Agustín de Ahumada was closed in 1771, leaving the Texas coast unoccupied except for La Bahía. In July 1772, however, the governor of Texas heard rumors that English traders were building a settlement in the area of the Texas coast that had been abandoned. The commander of La Bahía was sent to find the settlement, but saw no sign of other Europeans. His expedition did, however, trace the San Jacinto River to its mouth where it emptied into Galveston Bay.

=== Founding of Nacogdoches ===
The 500 Hispanic settlers who had lived near Los Adaes had to resettle in San Antonio in 1773. In the six years between the inspection and the removal of the settlers, the immigrant population of East Texas had increased from 200 Europeans to 500, a mixture of Spanish, French, Indians, and a few blacks. The settlers were given only five days to prepare to relocate to San Antonio. Many of them perished during the three-month trek and others died soon after arriving.

After protesting, they were permitted in the following year to return to East Texas, but only as far as the Trinity River, 175 miles (282 km) from Natchitoches. Led by Antonio Gil Y'Barbo, the settlers founded the town of Nuestra Señora del Pilar de Bucareli "where the trail from San Antonio to Los Adaes crossed the Trinity." The settlers helped smuggle contraband goods from Louisiana to San Antonio, and also helped the soldiers with coastal reconnaissance.

In May 1776, King Carlos III created a new position, the Commandancy General of the Internal Provinces of the North (Provincias Internas), to control frontier areas across northern New Spain, including Spanish Texas. The first appointee, Teodoro de Croix, served as governor and commander-in-chief of the area from 1776 until 1783. As de Croix prepared to take office, his predecessor, Baron of Ripperdà, wrote a detailed report, dated April 27, 1777, of the settlements in Texas. One-third of the report detailed the village of Bucareli, which he labeled as "'of the greatest importance as a means of acquiring reports of a coast as extensive as it is uninhabited.'" The Bucareli settlers regularly performed coastal explorations and developed a friendship with the Bidai tribe, who reported any signs of foreigners along the coast. In the summer of 1777, Gil Ybarbo discovered that a group of Englishmen had come from the sea and stayed long enough to plant a crop near the Neches River. He led an expedition to find the Englishmen, but, although they discovered the fields, the expedition did not find any of the settlers.

In 1779, the Comanches began raiding the Bucareli area, and the settlers chose to move further east to the old mission of Nacogdoches, where they founded the town of the same name. The new town quickly became a waystation for contraband. The settlers did not have authorization to move, and no troops were assigned to protect the new location until 1795.

== Conflict with the Native Americans ==
=== Apache raids ===
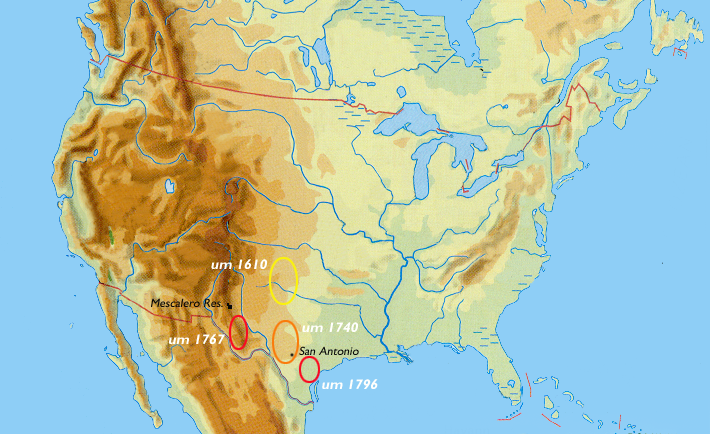
The Lipan Apache territories

The tribes traded freely, and soon many had acquired French guns, while others had traded for Spanish horses. Tribes without access to either resource were left at a disadvantage. The Lipan Apache, who had been seasonal farmers, were soon pressed by the Comanche, who had horses, and the Wichita, who had guns. The Apaches were bitter enemies of the Tejas of East Texas and had transferred their enmity to the Spanish as friends of the Tejas. After discovering San Antonio in 1720, the Apache mounted small-scale raids on the area to steal livestock, especially horses. The Hispanic population of San Antonio was only about 300 and all of Texas about 500 and the Apache killed an average of 3 Spaniards each year and stole approximately 100 animals from the beleaguered colony. In retaliation, the Spanish launched multiple attacks on the Apaches, capturing horses and mules, hides and other plunder, and taking Apache captives, whom the Spanish used as household slaves. By 1731, however, the San Antonio garrison was begging the government for help in negotiating a peace with the tribes.

The threat of Apache raids led to a constant state of unease in San Antonio, and some families left the area, while others refused to leave the safety of the town to tend their livestock. The problems culminated with a late-night raid on San Antonio by 350 Apache on June 30, 1745, retaliation for a Spanish military campaign several months before. The attackers were repelled with the assistance of 100 Indians from nearby Mission Valero. The Apache also preyed on other tribes, including the Deadose and Tonkawa. In the 1740s, these weaker tribes requested missions along the San Gabriel River in the hopes that the Spanish could protect them from attack. Mission San Francisco Xavier was established at the confluence of the San Gabriel River and Bushy Creek in January 1746 to serve the Deadose, Mayeye, and Coco Indians. In 1748 alone, the Apaches raided the mission four times, killing three soldiers and four of the Indian residents. Many of the resident Indians fled the mission due to the threat of attacks. This did not deter the missionaries, who founded two more missions, San Ildefonso and Nuestra Señora de la Candelaria, in the area the following year. Within six months, all of the potential converts at San Ildefonso had left. By 1755, the missions were transferred to a new location on the San Marcos River.

The Apache were coming under increased pressure from the Comanche advancing from the north and sought peace with the Spanish. A peace was declared in August 1749, when a group of Apache chiefs and Spanish officials "symbolically [buried] the trouble between the two parties" by burying weapons in the plaza at San Antonio. The Spanish also promised to provide military assistance to the Apache. The Lipan Apache had asked for missions several times, and in 1757 all property of the former San Gabriel missions, as well as the military garrison which briefly protected them, was transferred to new Mission Santa Cruz de San Sabá along the San Saba River northwest of San Antonio. A log stockade was constructed three miles (4.8 km) from the mission, on the other side of the river, so that the soldiers would not corrupt the Indians. The stockade could hold up to 400 including the 237 women and children who accompanied the soldiers.

Apaches shunned the mission, and on March 16, 1758, a band of Comanche, Tonkawa, and Hasinai warriors, angry that the Spaniards were assisting their Apache enemies, pillaged and burned the mission, killing eight people. The San Sabá mission was the only Spanish mission in Texas to be completely destroyed by Indians, and it was never rebuilt. Although the Indian force had 2000 members, they chose not to attack the fort.

The Spanish government refused to abandon the area completely out of fear that such an action would make them appear weak. While they planned a response, Indians raided the San Saba horse herd, stealing all of the horses and pack mules and killing 20 soldiers. In October 1759, Spain sent the San Sabá commander, Colonel Diego Ortiz Parrilla, on an expedition north to the Red River to avenge the attack. The tribes were forewarned and led Parrilla's army to a fortified Wichita village, surrounded by a stockade and a moat, where natives brandished French guns and waved a French flag. After a skirmish in which 52 Spaniards were killed, wounded, or deserted, the Spanish retreated. The San Sabá presidio was replaced with a limestone fortress and a moat, but the Comanches and their allies remained close and killed any soldiers who ventured out. By 1769, Spain abandoned the fort.

In 1762, missionaries established two unauthorized missions south of San Sabá, in the Nueces River valley. For several years the Apache lived in the missions most of the year, but left in winter to hunt buffalo. One of the missions closed in 1763, when the Apache never returned from their hunt. The surviving mission closed in January 1766, after a force of 400 natives from the northern tribes attacked, killing 6 Apaches and taking 25 captives as well as all the livestock in the valley. Forty-one Spanish troops and their small cannon ambushed the northern tribes as they returned to East Texas. Before the Spanish were forced to retreat, over 200 Indians and 12 Spanish soldiers died. After the battle, the Apache refused to return to the mission and returned to raiding near San Antonio. Raids by the northern tribes decreased, however.

=== Comanche ===
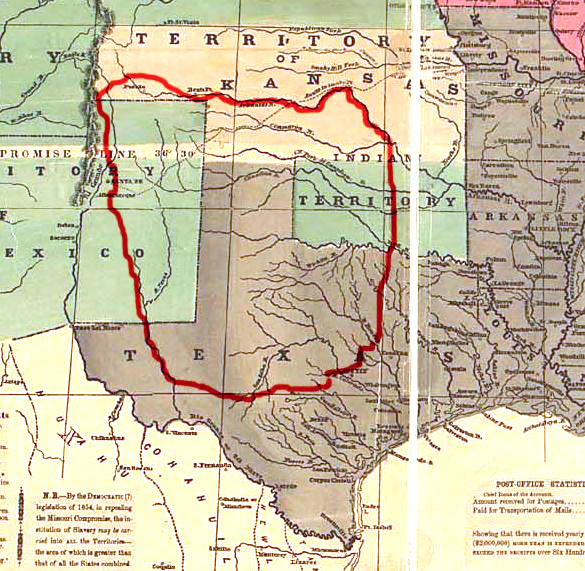
Comanchería prior to 1850. The Comanche shared the land with their allies, the Kiowa, Kiowa Apache, and Wichita.

The first recorded contact between the Comanche and the Spanish in Texas was in 1743 when a small band of Comanche visited San Antonio. The

Comanche were expanding southward from Colorado and pushing the Apache off the Great Plains. About 1750 they became the dominant power in the northwestern one-half of Texas, called the Comanchería (Spanish for "Comanche lands"), and maintained their dominance for 100 years. Through a combination of diplomacy and war, the Comanche established an extensive long-distance trade network and spread their language and culture among allied Indian tribes. Initially, the Spanish in Texas called them the norteños (northerners) a collective term for the Wichita and other Indian tribes in northern Texas.

The Comanche were divided into the western bands which primarily raided and traded in New Mexico and the eastern banks which primarily raided and traded in Texas. For much of the 1770s, the Comanche raided in New Mexico. The Comanche were defeated in a battle in Colorado in 1779 by a Spanish army led by New Mexico governor Juan Bautista de Anza and redirected their activities to the weakly defended Texas. During the same time period the Apaches, who had been stockpiling guns received from the Karankawas, returned to raiding settlements in Texas, violating their peace treaty. The Comanche promptly declared war on the Apache.

Gálvez became the viceroy of New Spain in 1785. Gálvez ordered that the Native Americans be encouraged to use alcohol, which they could only get through trading, and that the firearms they were traded be poorly made so that they would be awkward to use and easy to break. His policies were never implemented, as Spain did not have the money to provide gifts such as those to the tribes. Instead, the Spanish negotiated a treaty with the Comanche in late 1785. The treaty promised annual gifts to the Comanches, and the peace it brought lasted for the next 30 years. By late 1786, northern and western Texas were secure enough that Pedro Vial and a single companion safely "pioneered a trail from San Antonio to Santa Fe," a distance of 700 miles (1,100 km).

The Comanches were willing to fight the enemies of their new friends, and soon attacked the Karankawa. Over the next several years, the Comanches killed many of the Karankawa in the area and drove the others into Mexico. By 1804, very few natives lived on the barrier islands, where the Karankawa had made their home. In January 1790, the Comanche also helped the Spanish fight a large battle against the Mescalero and Lipan Apaches at Soledad Creek west of San Antonio. Over 1,000 Comanche warriors participated in raids against the Apache in 1791 and 1792, and the Apache were forced to scatter into the mountains in Mexico. In 1796, Spanish officials began an attempt to have the Apache and Comanche coexist in peace, and over the next ten years the intertribal fighting declined.

=== Karankawa difficulties ===
In 1776, Native Americans at the Bahia missions told the soldiers that the Karankawas had massacred a group of Europeans who had been shipwrecked near the mouth of the Guadalupe River. After finding the remains of an English commercial frigate, the soldiers warned the Karankawa to refrain from attacking seamen. The soldiers continued to explore the coast, and reported that foreign powers could easily build a small settlement on the barrier islands, which were difficult to access from the mainland, and then ascend the Trinity or San Jacinto Rivers into the heart of Texas. Captain Luis Cazorla, the commander of the La Bahía presidio, recommended that Spain build a small fort on the barrier islands and provide a shallow-draft vessel to continually reconnoiter the coast. The fort would be both a deterrent to the more bloodthirsty tribes and to the English. The Spanish government, fearful of smuggling, declined to give permission for a port or a boat on the Texas coast.

De Croix was unimpressed with his new province, complaining that,

"'A villa without order, two presidios, seven missions, and an errant population of scarcely 4,000 persons of both sexes and all ages that occupies an immense desert country, stretching from the abandoned presidio of Los Adaes to San Antonio, ... does not deserve the name of the Province of Texas ... nor the concern entailed in its preservation.'"

Despite his distaste for the area, he increased the number of troops in the interior provinces by 50% and created units of "light troops" which did not carry all of the heavy gear and could fight on foot. His administration also attempted to build alliances with native troops, and planned to work with the Comanche and the Wichita to wipe out the Apache raiders. The plan was shelved when Spain entered the American Revolution as an ally of the French and the American revolutionaries and money and troops were diverted to attacking Florida instead of exterminating the Apaches. After soldiers in Coahuila aligned with the Mescaleros against the Lipan Apaches, however, Spain was able to sign a peace treaty with the Lipans. The Comanches were also becoming more brazen, attacking Presidio La Bahía in 1781, where they were repulsed.

After hearing that Englishman George Gauld had surveyed the Gulf Coast all the way to Galveston Bay in 1777, Bernardo de Gálvez appointed a French engineer, Luis Antonio Andry, to conduct a similar survey for Spain. Andry finished his survey in March 1778, and anchored off Matagorda Bay after running dangerously low on provisions. Over a period of days, the Karankawa lured a few men at a time from the ship with offers of assistance and killed all but one, a Mayan sailor named Tomás de la Cruz. The Karankawa also burned the ship and the newly created map, possibly the first detailed Spanish map of the Texas-Louisiana coast. Several months later, the Native Americans living at Mission Rosario, near La Bahía, escaped to join the Karankawa, and together they began raiding livestock and harassing settlers. The governor pardoned many of the fugitives, and most of them returned to the mission. The Karankawa continued to cause difficulties for the Spanish, and in 1785 the interim commandant-general, Joseph Antonio Rengel, noted that they were unable to explore in the Matagorda Bay region as long as the Karankawa held it.

The Spanish again arranged for their coastline to be mapped, and in September 1783, José de Evia left Havana to chart the coastline between Key West and Matagorda Bay. During his journey, Evia gave Galveston Bay its name, in honor of his sponsor, De Gálvez. Evia later mapped the Nuevo Santander coast between Matagorda Bay and Tampico, part of which later belonged to Texas.

In 1791 and 1792, Fray José Francisco Garza befriended some of the Karankawa and other native peoples. Their friendship allowed Garza to explore much of the coastal areas that had been too dangerous to visit. The Native Americans requested that Garza build a mission at the junction of the San Antonio and Guadalupe Rivers, and in February 1793 Mission Nuestra Señora del Refugio opened near Mission Lake at the head of San Antonio Bay. Over 230 Native Americans lived at the mission initially, but within two years they were forced to move to a less flood-prone site, which became known as Refugio. By the end of the eighteenth century, only a small number of the hunting and gathering tribes within Texas had not been Christianized.

== Conflict with the United States ==
The Second Treaty of Paris in 1783 ended the American Revolution and established the United States of America. The treaty extended the new country's western boundary to the Mississippi River and within the first year after it was signed 50,000 American settlers crossed the Appalachian Mountains. As it was difficult to return east across the mountains, the settlers began looking toward the Spanish colonies of Louisiana and Texas to find places to sell their crops. Spain closed the mouth of the Mississippi to foreigners from 1784 until 1795 despite Thomas Jefferson's 1790 threat to begin an Anglo-Spanish war over the matter. Americans risked arrest to come to Texas, many of them desiring to capture wild mustangs in West Texas and trade with the Indians. In 1791, Philip Nolan became the first Anglo-American known to pursue horse-trading in Texas, and he was arrested several times for being within Spain's borders. The Spanish feared that Nolan was a spy, and in 1801 they sent 150 troops to capture Nolan and his party of 6 men; Nolan was killed during the ensuing battle. By 1810, many Americans were trading guns and ammunition to the Texas Indians, especially the Comanche, in return for livestock. Although some chiefs refused to trade with them and reported their movements to Spanish authorities, other bands welcomed the newcomers. A drought made rangeland scarce and stopped the Comanche's herds from increasing. To meet the American demand for livestock, the Comanche turned to raiding the area around San Antonio.

The Spanish government believed that security would come with a larger population, but was unable to attract colonists from Spain or from other New World colonies. By the late 18th century, Texas was one of the least populated regions of New Spain, with fewer than two inhabitants per square league. The population was relatively stagnant, having grown only to 3,169 individuals in 1790 from 3,103 in 1777. Over half of the population was classified as Spaniards, with settled Indians making up the next largest category. Blacks, mostly slaves, made up less than 1% of the population in 1777, and only 2.2% of the 1793 census. Over two-thirds of the adults in Texas were married, and single men outnumbered single women, although there was a high percentage of widows. Intermarriage was fairly common, mostly between white men and women of mixed origin. Children from these unions often passed as whites. Illegitimate births increased steadily throughout the century, reaching 20% of all births in 1799. Despite the small population, however, Spain actively discouraged immigration to Texas, and a permanent garrison was placed in Nacogdoches in 1790 to keep foreigners from settling in the area. Immigrants from the United States were allowed to settle in Louisiana and Florida after taking an oath of allegiance, but were not required to convert to Roman Catholicism.

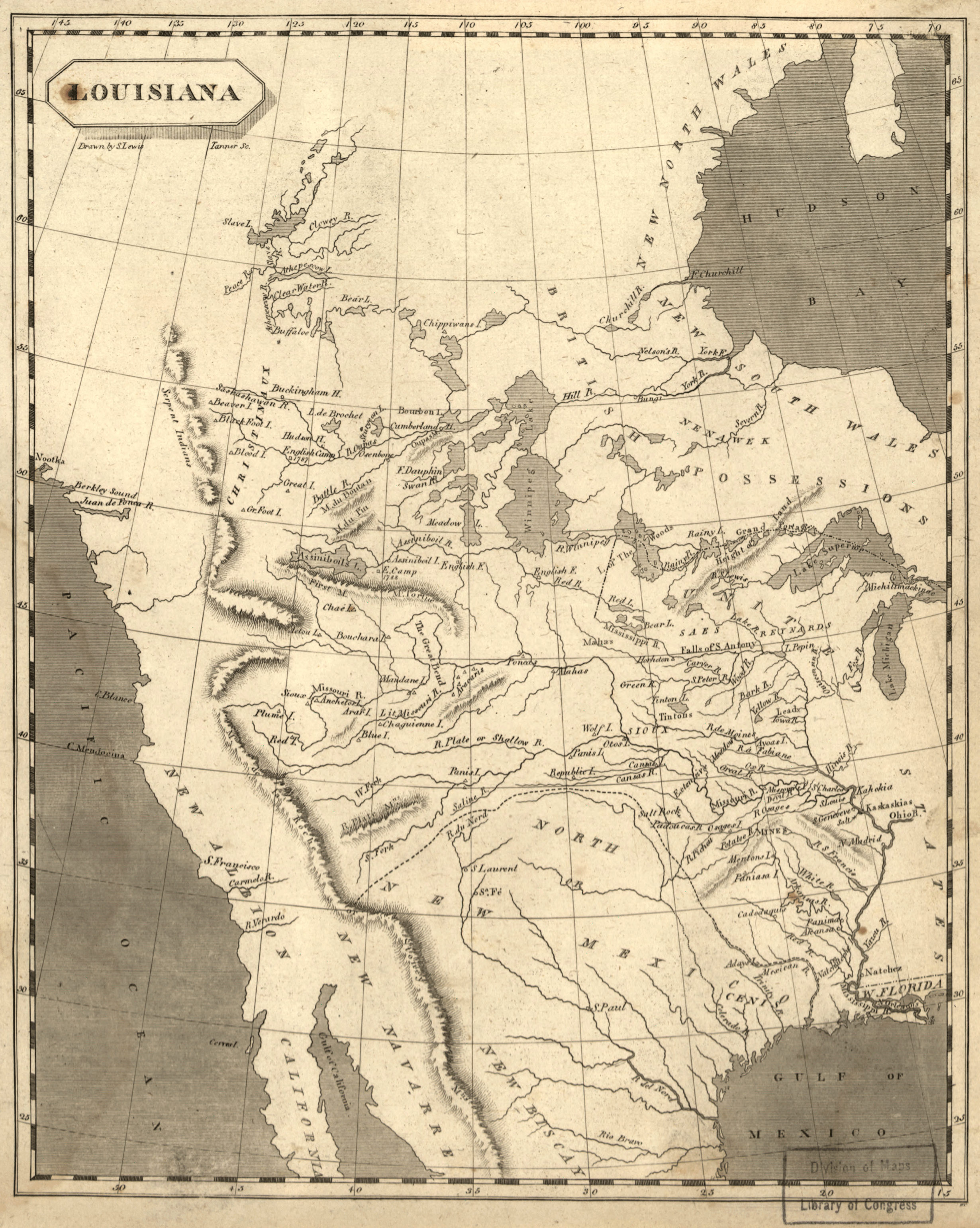
The Louisiana Territory and Texas in 1804

In 1799, Spain gave Louisiana back to France in exchange for the promise of a throne in central Italy. Although the agreement was signed on October 1, 1800, it did not go into effect until 1802. The following year, Napoleon sold Louisiana to the United States. Many of the Spaniards who had moved to the colony left for Texas, Florida, or other Spanish-held lands. The original agreement between Spain and France had not explicitly specified the borders of Louisiana, and the descriptions in the documents were ambiguous and contradictory. Even when both territories had been under Spanish control, there was disagreement on where the border should be. In 1793, the King of Spain decided that there was no need to move the boundary from Natchitoches to the Sabine River, as had been recommended by some Frenchmen.

The United States insisted that its purchase also included most of West Florida and all of Texas. Thomas Jefferson claimed that Louisiana stretched west to the Rocky Mountains and included the entire watershed of the Mississippi and Missouri Rivers and their tributaries, and that the southern border was the Rio Grande. Spain maintained that Louisiana extended only as far as Natchitoches, and that it did not include West Florida or the Illinois Territory.

Texas was again considered a buffer province, this time between New Spain and the United States. In 1804, Spain planned to send thousands of colonists to increase the number of residents in Texas (then at 4,000 Hispanic inhabitants). The plan was cancelled as the government did not have the money to relocate the settlers. The responsibility for defending Texas now rested with Nemesio Salcedo, who held the newly reopened position of Commandant General of the Internal Provinces. Salcedo promoted immigration to Texas, and a new town, Trinidad de Salcedo, was founded where the Trinity River intersected the road from San Antonio to Nacogdoches. For a brief time, Salcedo also allowed former Spanish subjects from Louisiana to come to Texas. A few Americans who had become naturalized Spaniards settled in Texas during that time. Salcedo warned, however, that "'the foreigners are not and will not be anything but crows to pick out our eyes.'"

King Charles IV of Spain ordered data compiled to determine the true boundary. Before the border was settled, both sides led armed excursions into the disputed areas, and Spain began increasing the number of troops stationed in Texas. By 1806, the number had doubled, with over 883 stationed in and around Nacogdoches. At the end of 1806, local commanders negotiated a temporary agreement in which neither the Spanish nor the Americans would venture into the area between the Sabine River and Arroyo Hondo. This neutral ground quickly became a haven for lawlessness and it did not stop individuals from crossing the boundary. While on a mission for the United States Army to explore some of the disputed areas of the Louisiana Purchase Zebulon Pike was arrested by the Spanish while camping on the Rio Grande and escorted back to Natchitoches. Although his maps and notes were confiscated, Pike was able to recreate most of it from memory. His glowing comments about Texas lands and animals made many Americans yearn to control the territory.

== End of Spanish period ==
In May 1808, Napoleon forced King Ferdinand VII to abdicate the Spanish throne. His replacement, Napoleon's elder brother Joseph Bonaparte (Joseph I), was appointed King of Spain, to violent protests from the Spanish citizens. The uprisings continued for the next six years, until his abdication in 1814 and the return of Ferdinand VII. During the time, there was little oversight of the New World colonies. A shadow government operated out Cádiz during Joseph's reign, operating under the Spanish Constitution of 1812. The constitutional government included representatives from the colonies, including Texas and New Mexico in New Spain. When King Ferdinand VII resumed his throne, he refused to recognize the new constitution or the representative government. He was forced to change his mind in 1820 as the only way to avert a military coup.

During this time of turmoil, it was unclear who actually governed the colonies: Joseph I, the shadow government representing Ferdinand VII, the colonial officials, or revolutionaries in each province. The Mexican War of Independence began in 1810 at the instigation of Miguel Hidalgo. Fearing that the revolution would reach colonial Texas, governor Manuel María de Salcedo ordered the Texas borders closed to all foreigners. He was soon reversed by his uncle, the Commandant General. In January 1811, revolutionaries led by Juan Bautista de las Casas overthrew and imprisoned Salcedo, and established a new government in Texas. Salcedo persuaded Ignacio Elizondo (his jailer) to return to the royalist cause and the two organized a counter-coup. Las Casas and Hidalgo were each captured and executed by the end of the summer.

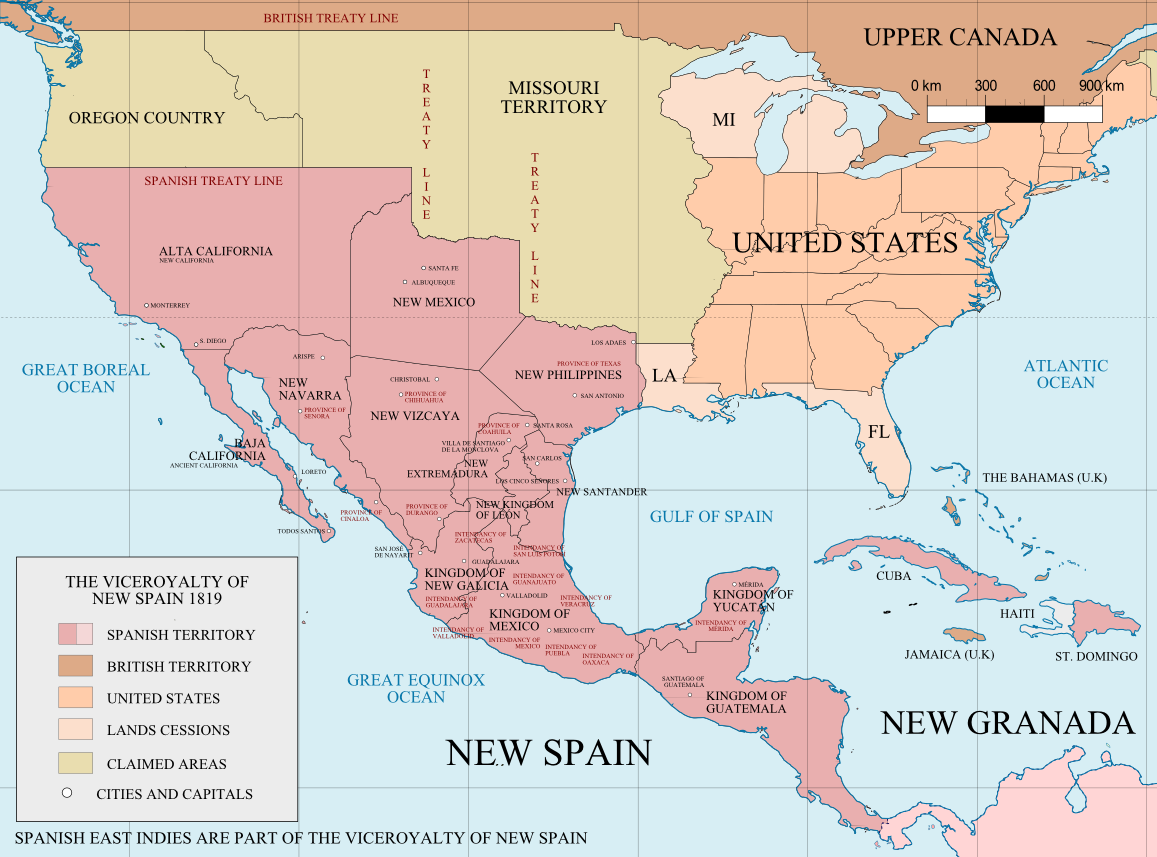
The Viceroyalty of New Spain in 1819

Although officially neutral during the Mexican War of Independence, the United States allowed rebels to trade at American ports and much of the weaponry and ammunition used by the rebels came from the United States. Americans also provided manpower for the conflict, with Natchitoches serving as a launching point for several expeditions into Texas. In 1812, Mexican insurgent Bernardo Gutiérrez de Lara led a small force of Americans into Texas. Indians from the eastern part of Texas quickly joined the insurgency. Calling themselves the Republican Army of the North, the group captured San Antonio in 1813, assassinated the governor, Manuel María de Salcedo, and proclaimed Texas independent from Spain. The death of the governor caused many of the Anglo-Americans to desert the cause, but on April 17, 1813, the Gutiérrez–Magee Expedition members composed Texas's first constitution, which provided for a centralized form of government. Spanish forces recaptured the province later that year at the Battle of Medina, and killed 1300 and executed any Tejanos accused of having Republican tendencies. Within 2 weeks almost 400 rebels were executed and their wives and daughters were imprisoned for 2 months. Royalist soldiers even chased many of the women and children who had fled San Antonio, killing 200–300. Captured Americans were given an opportunity to take an oath of loyalty to Spain, and those who refused were escorted back to the United States. Fearing that the Comanche would still constitute a threat, Spanish general Arredondo ordered all ranchers to move temporarily to San Antonio to help defend the city. When they returned to their ranches several months later, they found that the Comanche had slaughtered all of the livestock, leaving most of the carcasses where they fell. The Spanish army looted the rest of Texas too, and by 1820 fewer than 2000 Hispanic citizens remained in Texas. "Spanish Texas, or what remained of it, had become a desolate, unprotected land that could not feed itself."

Another revolutionary, José Manuel Herrera, created a government on Galveston Island in September 1816 which he proclaimed part of a Mexican Republic. A group of French exiles in the United States attempted to create their own colony on the Trinity River, known as Le Champ d'Asile. The exiles planned to use the colony as a base to liberate New Spain and then free Napoleon from St. Helena. They abandoned the colony shortly and returned to Galveston.

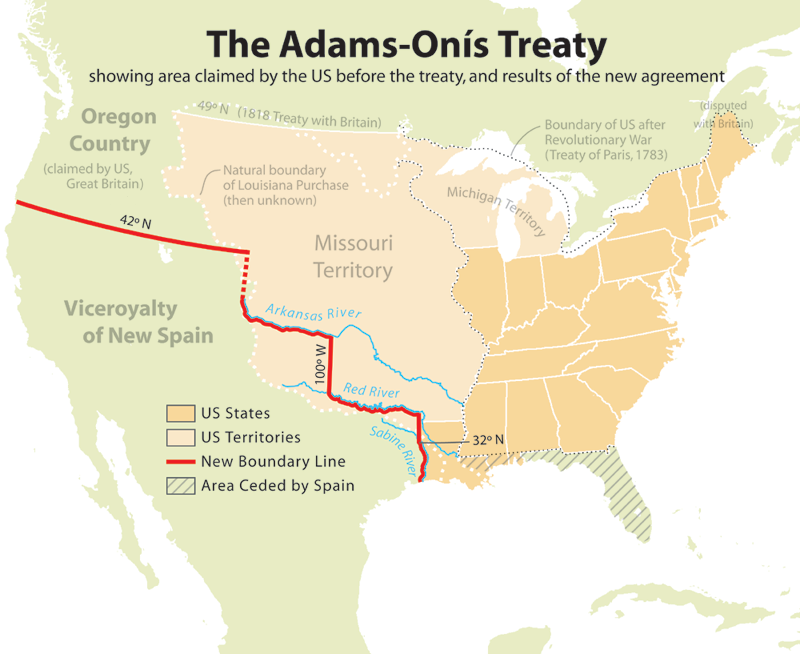
This map shows the results of the Transcontinental Treaty, which ended the border conflict between Spain and the United States.

On February 22, 1819, Spain and the United States reached agreement on the Transcontinental Treaty, which ceded Florida to the United States in return for the United States relinquishing its claim on Texas. The official boundary of Texas was set at the Sabine River (the current boundary between Texas and Louisiana), then following the Red and Arkansas Rivers to the 42nd parallel (California's current northern border). For the next two years, until early February 1821, Spain delayed ratification of the treaty, using it as leverage to prevent the United States from formally recognizing one of the rebellious Spanish colonies as an independent nation. During this period many Americans spoke out against the treaty and the renunciation of the claim to Texas. An essay in the City of Washington Gazette denounced the treaty, claiming that "'a league'" of the land in Texas was worth more to the United States "'than the whole territory west of the Rocky Mountains'".

In 1819, James Long led the Long Expedition to invade Texas. He declared Texas an independent republic, but by the end of the year his rebellion had been quelled by Colonel Juan Ignacio Pérez and his Spanish troops. The following year Long established a new base near Galveston Bay "to free Texas from 'the yoke of Spanish authority... the most atrocious despotism that ever disgraced the annals of Europe.'" His basis for a rebellion was soon gone, however.

On February 24, 1821, Agustín de Iturbide launched a drive for Mexican Independence. Texas became a territory of the newly independent nation of Mexico.

== Spanish Texas population ==
Population Statistics of Spanish Texas
| Year | Pop Spaniards/Criollo | Mestizo, Castizo and other castes | Amerindians | Total Population |
|---|---|---|---|---|
| 1682 | 129 (Coulson and Joyce estimates for Ysleta Mission, first Spanish foundation in modern-day Texas) | - | - | - |
| 1731 | 500 | - | - | - |
| 1742 (Peter Gerhard estimations) | 1,800 | - | 1,290 | 3,090 |
| 1761 | About 1,200 | - | - | - |
| 1777 | - | - | - | 3,103 |
| 1780 | 2,000 | - | - | 4,000 |
| 1790 (Revillagigedo census) | 1,326 | 1,083 | 912 | 3,169 - 3,334 |
| 1800 | 4,800 (Juan Bautista Elguézabal census) | - | - | - |
| 1810 | 5,000 | - | - | 3,334 (Fernando Navarro y Noriega estimation, included in his work Memoria sobre la población de Nueva España) |
| 1821 | 2,500 (Note: The Mexican War of Independence caused a loss of population throughout the country, including Texas. On the other hand, Spanish Texas consisted of East Texas and the part of Louisiana bordering Texas, where Los Adaes was located. West Texas belonged to Santa Fe de New Mexico, which included El Paso. In 1821, El Paso and the surrounding area had 8,000 Hispanics.) | - | - | - |
| 1830 | 3,000 | - | - | - |

== Legacy ==
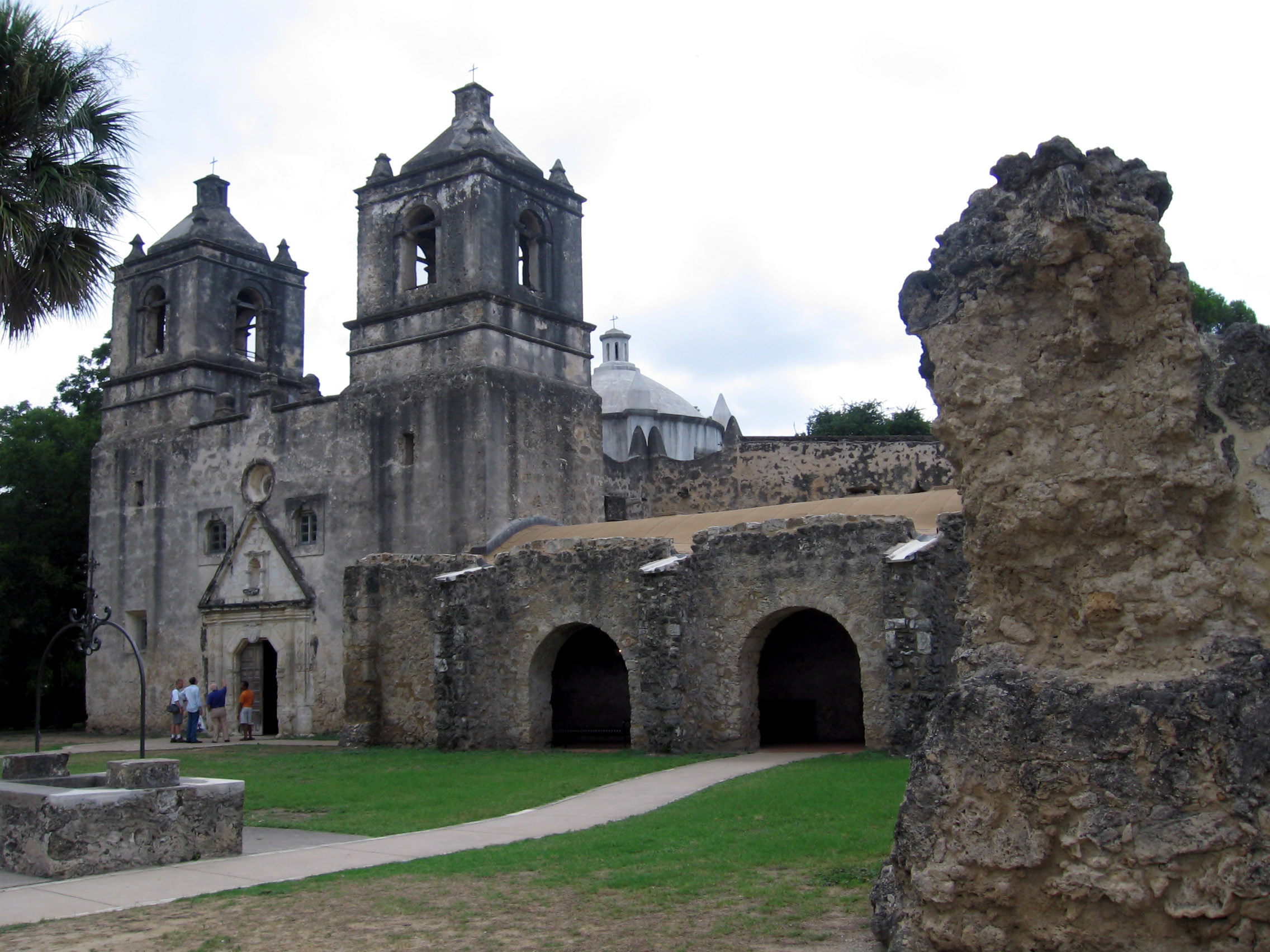
Mission Concepción is one of the San Antonio missions which is part of a National Historic Landmark.

Spanish control of Texas was followed by Mexican control of Texas, and it can be difficult to separate the Spanish and Mexican influences on the future state. The most obvious legacy is that of the language; the state's name comes from the Spanish rendering of an Indian word. Every major river in modern Texas, except the Red River, has a Spanish or Anglicized name, as do 42 of the state's 254 counties and numerous towns also bear Spanish names. Even many of the words that have been incorporated into American English, such as barbecue, canyon, ranch, and plaza, come from Spanish words. An additional obvious legacy is that of Roman Catholicism. At the end of Spain's reign over Texas, virtually all inhabitants practiced the Catholic Christian religion, and it is still practiced in Texas by a large number of people. The Spanish missions built in San Antonio to convert Indians to Catholicism have been restored and are a National Historic Landmark.

The landscape of Texas was changed as a result of some Spanish policies. As early as the 1690s, Spaniards brought European livestock, including cattle, horses, and mules, with them on their expeditions throughout the province. Some of the livestock strayed or stayed behind when the Spanish retreated from the territory in 1693, allowing the Indian tribes to begin loosely managing herds of the animals. These herds grazed heavily on the native grasses, allowing mesquite, which was native to the lower Texas coast, to spread inland. Although the introduced livestock were able to adapt to the changing conditions, the buffalo had a more difficult time grazing among the new vegetation, beginning the decline in their numbers. Spanish farmers also introduced tilling and irrigation to the land, further changing the landscape. Spanish architectural concepts were also adopted by those in Texas, including the addition of patios, tile floors and roofs, arched windows and doorways, carved wooden doors, and wrought iron grillwork.

Although Texas eventually adopted much of the Anglo-American legal system, many Spanish legal practices were retained. Among these was the Spanish model of keeping certain personal property safe from creditors. Texas implemented the first homestead exemption in the United States in 1839, and its property exemption laws are now the most liberal in the United States. Furthermore, Spanish law maintained that both husband and wife should share equally in the profits of marriage, and, like many other former Spanish provinces, Texas retained the idea of community property rather than use the Anglo laws in which all property belonged to the husband. Furthermore, Spanish law allowed an independent executor to be named in probate cases who is not required to gain court permission for each act not explicitly listed in the testament. Texas retained this idea, and it has eventually spread to other states, included Arizona, Washington, and Idaho. In other legal matters, Texas kept the Spanish principle of adoption, becoming the first U.S. state to allow adoption.

== See also ==
- Spanish Texas topics
- Pre-statehood history of Texas
- List of colonial and Mexican governors of Texas
- Bibliography of the Texas Revolution, Republic, and Annexation
