= Pedro de Rivera y Villalón =

- Born: late seventeenth - early eighteenth century
- Died: eighteenth century
- Occupations: Brigadier general and inspect

Pedro de Rivera y Villalón was a brigadier general in the Spanish army, who was sent to New Mexico in 1724 to study the presidios near Louisiana.

== Biography ==
Pedro de Rivera y Villalón was born between the late seventeenth and early eighteenth century. In his youth, he joined the Spanish army, in which, over time, he managed to ascend to the rank of general.

Rivera was in New Mexico for a time. This was so until in 1724 he was sent him to north New Spain by the Viceroy of New Spain. His journey began November 21, 1724, and ended June 21, 1728. He wrote descriptions of Nayarit, New Vizcaya, Nueva México, Sonora, the Nuevo Reino de Filipinas, and of Coahuila and Nuevo Reino de León. He studied the presidios that New Spain had to the borders with Louisiana, to check if these were able to protect the region. Rivera traveled a very extensive space, formed by more than 8,000 miles. The military man was interested in the life of the population, so he left reflected in his diary many particularities of the Texan population, such as the local customs, the description of Native Americans and products that were cultivated. He also indicated the areas where people lived.

In 1727 the engineer Francisco Alvarez Barreyto, member of his expedition, drew up a map of the borders with Louisiana. In addition, Rivera revised political management of Melchor de Mediavilla y Azcona, Captain of the Presidio of Bexar, and found several errors in his administration of the presidio. Rivera recommended to the Virrey to reduce the number of officials of the presidio, to reduce the price of the supplies that the garrison needed, and to remove some of their equipment, because not all that was in the garrison was necessary. He also indicated that the Presidio de Nuestra Señora de los Dolores should to be removed and the number of people who formed the garrison of Nuestra Señora del Pilar was too high and should be limited to only 60 people. Mediavilla accepted Rivera's suggestions and these were carried out, despite the fact that the Viceroy of New Spain, Juan de Acuña, had refused to approve its realization. This caused disaffection among Mediavilla and the viceroy.

On March 5, 1731 (and following the Rivera's advice), three missions were renamed in San Antonio:

- Nuestra Señora de la Purísima Concepción de los Hainai was renamed Nuestra Señora de la Purisima Concepción de Acuña;
- San Francisco de los Neches was renamed San Francisco de la Espada;
- San Jose de los Nazones was renamed San Juan Capistrano.

Presidio La Bahía was not removed, but his report prompted to consider the transfer of three missions located in East Texas to San Antonio in 1731.

Rivera left Texas on June 29, 1728. After his trip, Rivera asked that the Texas economy be strengthened. He also pointed out the need to suppress the Apaches, and replace the presidio La Bahía with one established in River Medina to control the Apaches.

== Books published ==
• Pedro de Rivera, Diario y derrotero de lo caminado, Haviendo transitado por los Reinos del Nuevo Toledo, el de la Nueva Galicia, el de la Nueva Vizcaya, el de la Nueva Mexico, el de la Nueva Estremadura, el de las Nuevas Philipinas, el de Nuevo de Leon. Las Provincias, de Sonora, Ostimuri, Sinaloa, y Guasteca. Guatemala, Sebastián de Arebalo, printer, 1736.
