= Juan de Acuña, 1st Marquess of Casa Fuerte =

Mexican politician

The Most Excellent The Marquess of Casa Fuerte KOS
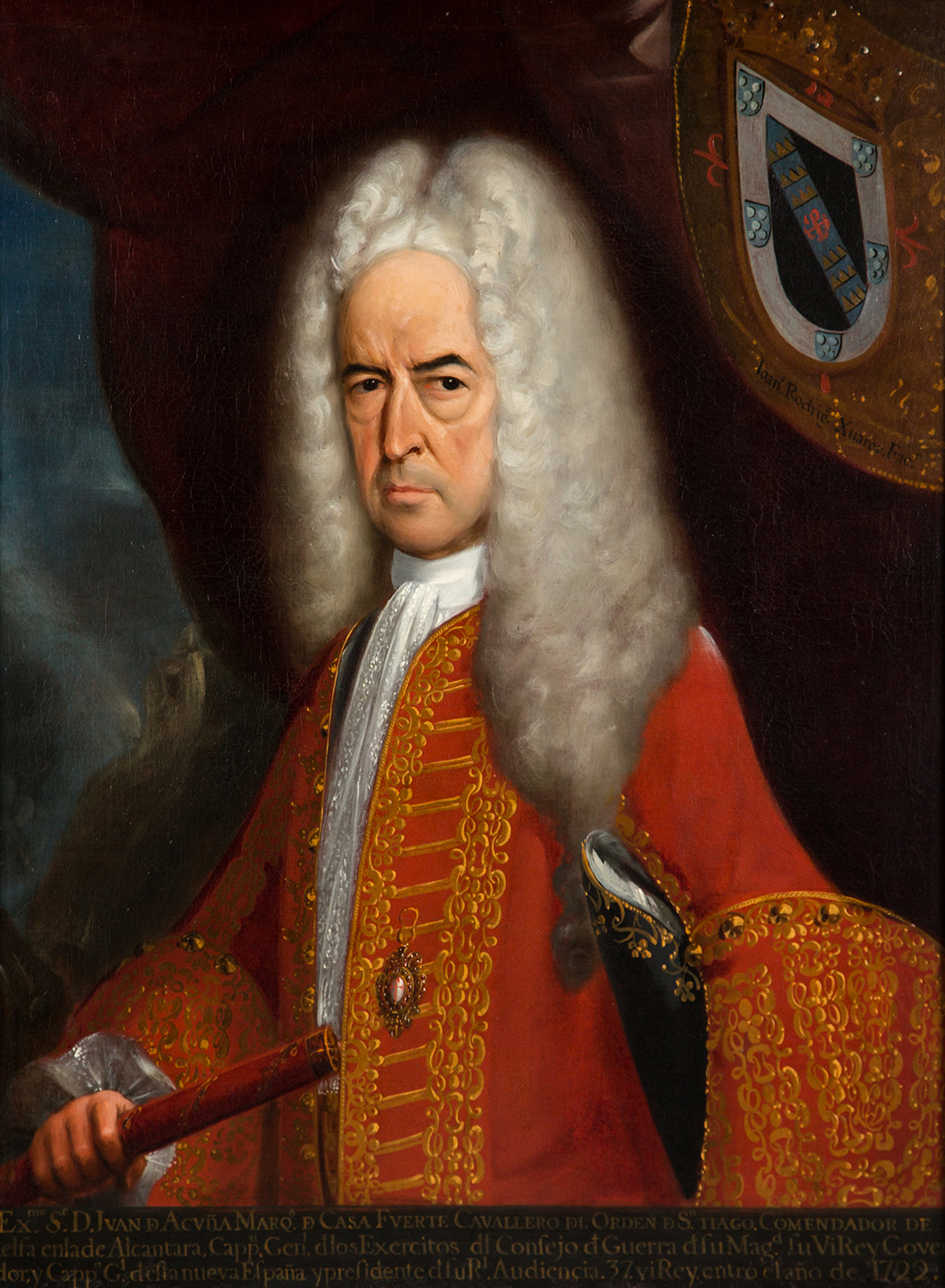
- Portrait by Juan Rodríguez Juárez

37th Viceroy of New Spain
- In office October 15, 1722 – March 17, 1734
- Monarchs: Felipe V Luis I
- Secretary of the Universal Bureau: José de Grimaldo; Juan Bautista de Orendáin; Baron Ripperda; José de Patiño y Rosales
- Secretary of State for the Navy and the Indies: Andres Matías de Pes Marzaraga; Antonio de Sopeña y Mioño; José de Patiño y Rosales
- Preceded by: Baltasar de Zúñiga
- Succeeded by: Juan Antonio de Vizarrón

Personal details
- Born: February 22, 1658 Lima, Peru, Spanish Empire
- Died: March 17, 1734 (aged 76) Mexico City, New Spain, Spanish Empire

Juan de Acuña y Bejarano, 1st Marquess of Casa Fuerte (Spanish: Juan de Acuña y Bejarano, primer Marqués de Casa Fuerte; February 22, 1658 – March 17, 1734) was a Spanish military officer and viceroy of New Spain.

== Background ==
Juan de Acuña was the second Criollo (meaning that he was Spanish but born in the New World) to govern in New Spain. He was born in Lima in 1658, the son of Juan de Acuña and of Margarita Bejarano. At a young age joined the military. He distinguished himself in the service, holding many important positions. He began as a captain of infantry and advanced to general of artillery. He was governor of Messina, Sicily. He was made knight of the military Order of Santiago. He was military commander of the kingdoms of Aragon and Mallorca when he was named viceroy, captain general and president of the Audiencia of New Spain.

== As viceroy ==
Acuña made his solemn entry into Mexico City and took up his positions on October 15, 1722. He was well liked by the people of New Spain, not only because he was a criollo, but also because he chose his officials with more regard for their abilities than for their influence. Acuña found a nearly empty treasury and a great public debt, and it was necessary that he pay special attention to the finances of the colony. He was able to augment the rents due the treasury by about one million pesos annually, to eight million pesos a year. Acuña also pacified completely the region of Nayar, sending an armed expedition there under Juan Flores de San Pedro and establishing colonies. He also established a cannon foundry in Orizaba (Veracruz) to arm the ports and the coast guard. He improved the drainage in the mines in Pachuca (Hidalgo), allowing more veins of ore to be worked.

During his tenure as viceroy, British colonists began establishing settlements in Spanish-controlled Yucatan and Central America to harvest tropical timber. A Spanish privateer seized a British frigate and sloop which were transporting a cargo of logwood off Cabo Catoche; in response, Acuña sent a Spanish force consisting of a galleon, two pirogues and 300 men to liquidate the British settlements. However, after they arrived at the settlements, the Spanish realised the British could muster 800 men and several large ships to oppose them, and ultimately retreated. Spanish diplomatic efforts to terminate the British presence in the region were also unsuccessful, and Acuña decided to let the matter drop. Instead, he focused on strengthening the military of New Spain, including the garrisons at San Juan de Ulúa, Isla del Carmen, Veracruz, and the bays of Espíritu Santo and Pensacola.

In 1728 he authorized Juan Francisco Sahugún de Arévalo to restart the newspaper La Gaceta de México, which had been suspended in 1722. In 1730 he directed that all the silversmiths move to a central location, San Francisco Street, now calle de Francisco I. Madero. In 1731 he ordered the construction of the customshouse, with all its warehouses, and the rebuilding of the mint. The latter institution already was known around the world for the quality of its work. In 1730 the mint produced more than ten million pesos of silver and 151,560 of gold, conforming to rigorous standards of weight and form.

As a consequence of his honesty and good government, in 1727 his term of office was extended for three years. In March 1731, sixteen families (56 people) from the Canary Islands, often referred to as the "Canary Islanders," arrived at the Presidio San Antonio de Béxar in the Province of Texas. By royal decree of King Philip V of Spain, they founded La Villa de San Fernando by the San Antonio River and established the first civil government in Texas. The Viceroy of New Spain, the Marquess of Casa Fuerte, bestowed upon each Canary Island family titles of nobility. Many descendants of these first settlers still reside in San Antonio. He placed strong limits on the actions of the Inquisition, which he accused of irregular and unjust proceedings.

In response to a petition from the viceroy, the pope ordered the construction of the Colegiata de Nuestra Señora de Guadalupe. In 1730 the archbishop, in the presence of the viceroy, inaugurated the great screen of the choir at the cathedral. It had been fabricated in Macau and brought to New Spain by the galleon from China.

Juan de Acuña y Manrique died in the capital of the colony on March 17, 1734. He was interred in the church of San Cosme y San Damián.

== Arms ==
Heraldry of Juan de Acuña, 1st Marquess of Casa Fuerte
