= Comanche-Spanish peace treaties =

1785 and 1786 treaties in New Mexico and Texas

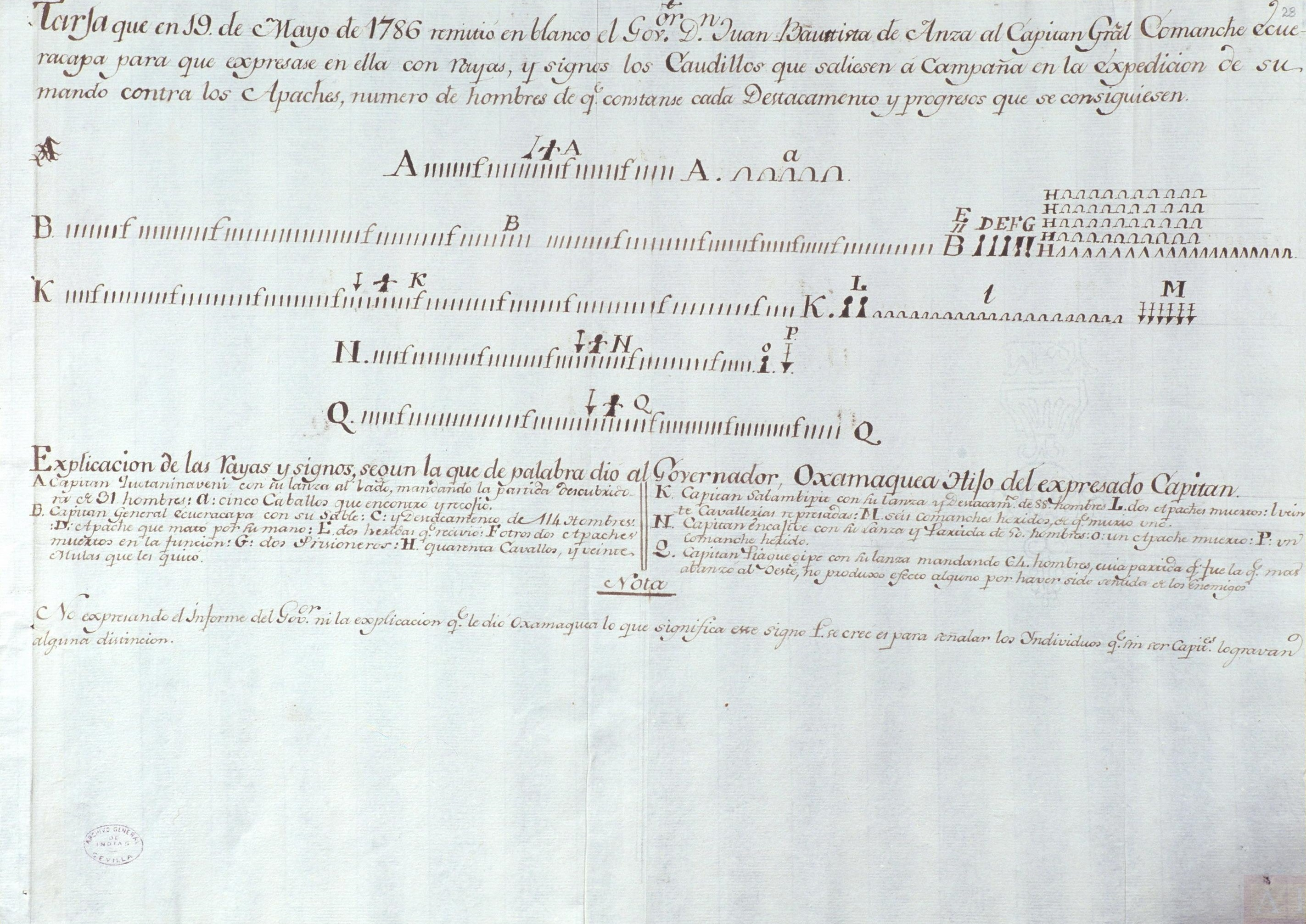
Blank card sent by Governor Juan Bautista de Anza to Comanche Captain General Ecueracapa in 1786

Two Comanche-Spanish peace treaties in 1785 and 1786 resulted in a permanent peace between the Comanche in Comancheria and the Spanish colony of Santa Fe de Nuevo México and a lengthy, albeit interrupted, peace between the Comanche and the Spanish in Texas. Since their first contacts with the Spanish in 1706, the Comanches had raided the colonies and been a threat to their continued existence. In the 1780s several factors combined to give both sides the incentive to negotiate peace treaties which resulted in expanded trade between the Spanish and the Comanche and a combined effort to defeat their mutual enemy, the Apache. The treaties essentially turned New Mexico into a protectorate of the Comanche from the 1780s to 1821, when the success of the Mexican War of Independence ended the treaties.

== Background ==
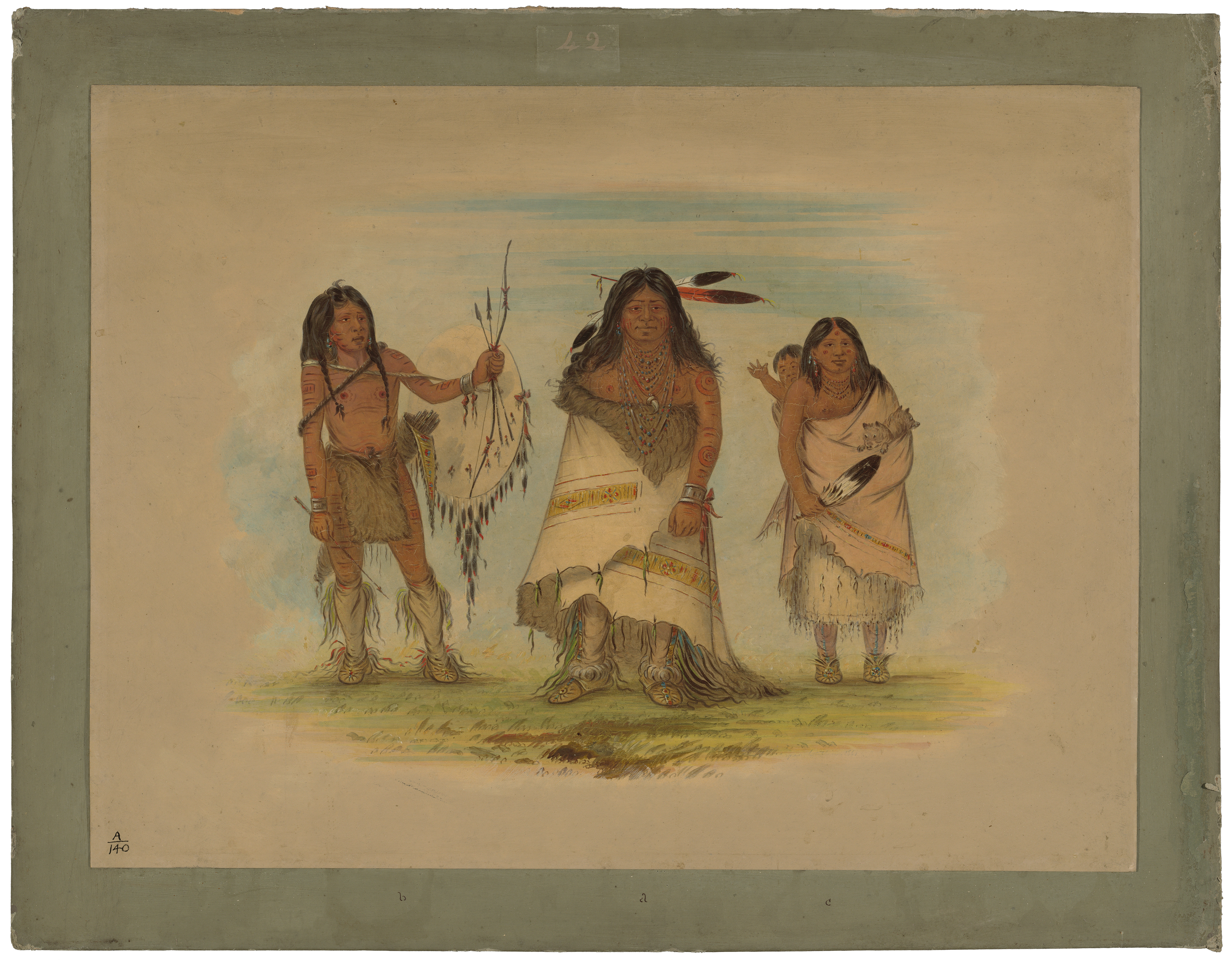
Comanches by George Catlin

In the mid-eighteenth century the Comanche posed a threat to the survival of Spanish settlements in New Mexico and Texas. The Comanche first came to the attention of the Spanish in New Mexico in 1706. They were expanding southward at the time, pushing the Apache off the Great Plains. In 1743, a Comanche band visited San Antonio, the first Spanish record of their presence in Texas. By that time the Comanche were gaining control over a large area of the Great Plains, called Comancheria by the Spanish, reaching from the Arkansas River in Colorado to near San Antonio.

The Comanche were pure nomads, practicing no agriculture and with no permanent settlements. They acquired horses in the early 18th century, relied on bison (buffalo) for subsistence, and were adroit at war, diplomacy, and trade. By 1750, they were divided by geography into two groups: the western Comanche who lived mostly in southern Colorado and the eastern Comanche who lived mostly in northern Texas. The Comanche are estimated to have numbered ten to fifteen thousand in 1750. Their numbers were growing rapidly due to incorporating captives and members of other tribes into their society, reaching a maximum population of twenty to thirty thousand in 1780. By contrast the population of the New Mexico colony (including 5,100 people in the El Paso, Texas region) in 1776 was 18,544 (including 8,602 Pueblo Indians) and the population of the Texas colony in 1780 was about 4,000. The Taovaya, a Wichita tribe who lived along the Red River in Texas and Oklahoma and numbered several thousands, were an important Comanche ally and trading partner although in reduced numbers after an epidemic, possibly smallpox, in 1777–1778.

Several factors led the Comanche to be receptive to peace with the Hispanic population in New Mexico and Texas. In 1779, the governor of New Mexico, Juan Bautista de Anza, defeated and killed the Comanche chief Cuerno Verde (Green Horn) in a battle that took place south of 21st century Pueblo, Colorado. Secondly, a continent-wide smallpox epidemic in 1780-1781 caused thousands of deaths among the Comanche. Third, the Osage from Missouri and other eastern Indians were becoming rivals on the Great Plains and were better armed because of their ties to traders, mostly of French origin, in St. Louis. Drought was a recurrent threat to Comanche livelihood and their raiding and trading proto-empire.

Although both New Mexico and Texas were provinces of the Viceroyalty of New Spain governed from Mexico City, the Comanche dealt with them as separate entities. To the Comanche, an agreement with one did not apply to both. The Comanche had no centralized government, although as the negotiations of the peace treaties with the Spanish would demonstrate they had the capability of unified action.

== Treaty with the eastern Comanche ==
Spanish and Comanche Texas in 1794

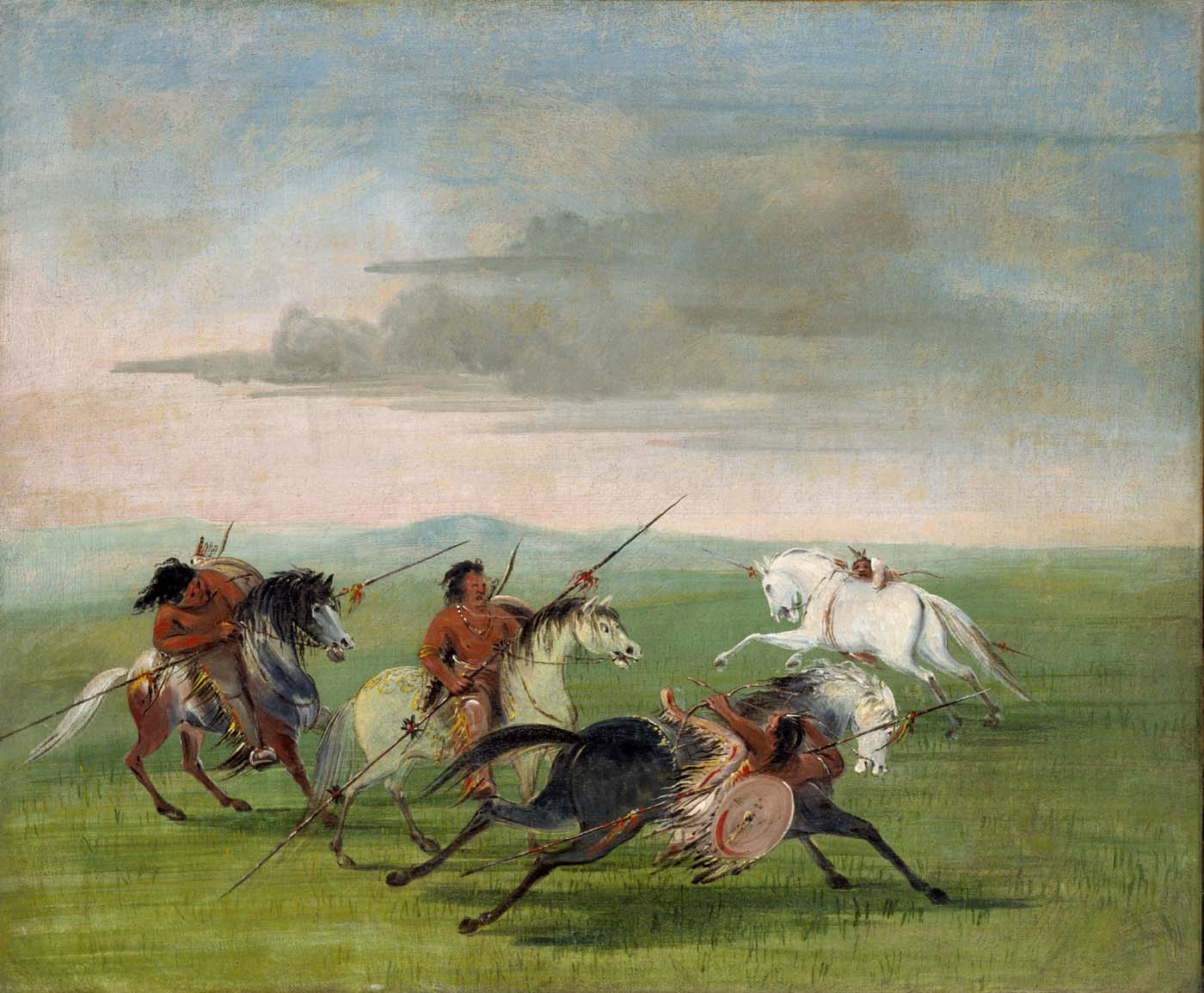
The Comanche were famous for their horsemanship and their large herds of horses

In 1766-1768 the Marqués de Rubí surveyed the beleaguered northern frontier of New Spain. Rubí recommended that Spanish settlements in Texas north of San Antonio be abandoned and that the Spanish make peace with the Comanche to ally against the Apache, their common enemy.

Rubí's recommendations were adopted but no progress was made with the Comanches until 1784. In autumn of that year, an emissary from Domingo Cabello y Robles, the Spanish governor of Texas, persuaded two Frenchmen and a Spaniard living among the Taovaya and four Taovaya and Wichita to visit San Antonio in an attempt to improve relations between the Spanish and the Wichita peoples, who were allies of the Comanche. One of the Frenchmen was Pedro Vial, a blacksmith who had lived among the Taovaya for many years and spoke their language, Cabello persuaded Vial to remain in San Antonio to work as a blacksmith. Another 1784 arrival in San Antonio was Francisco Xavier Chaves, (also spelled Cháves) twenty-two years old, a Spaniard captured as a child in New Mexico by the Comanche, later sold to the Taovaya, and who decided (or escaped) to return to live among the Spanish. Chaves spoke both the Comanche and Wichita languages.

In May 1785, Governor Cabello, under pressure from the Viceroy in Mexico City to reach peace with the Comanche, persuaded Vial to undertake a peace mission to the Comanche. Vial selected Chaves to accompany him because of his familiarity with the Comanche and knowledge of the language. Vial and Chaves and two servants began their mission at Nacogdoches, Texas on July 23, 1785, meeting Taovaya and Wichita chiefs there for the annual distribution of gifts to them from the Spanish. They journeyed to the twin Taovaya villages on the Red River in company with two Taovaya leaders. The party arrived at the villages (near present-day Spanish Fort, Texas) on August 6. The Taovaya agreed with Vial's objective of making peace with the Comanche. Accompanied by Taovaya chiefs, Vial and Chaves journeyed to meet the various bands of the eastern Comanche (Cuchanees or Kotsoteka) on the Little Wichita River near present-day Wichita Falls, Texas. Vial persuaded three of the Comanche chiefs to accompany him to San Antonio for peace talks with the Governor. The Comanche chiefs, their wives, and Vial and Chaves arrived there on September 29.

Governor Cabello made haste to welcome his Comanche guests and the Comanche stayed in San Antonio for nearly three weeks enjoying the best the frontier outpost could offer. The two sides agreed to a peace treaty. The Comanche pledged to be friends with the Spanish, to return Spanish captives, and not to admit any strangers (i.e. French traders) to their camps. They furthermore said they would notify the governor when they planned to travel south into Mexico-claimed territory to fight their mutual enemies, the Lipan and Mescalero Apache. In return the Spanish pledged to provide the Comanche with gifts. The formal ratification of the agreement was delayed for six months while the governor assembled sufficient gifts to meet Spanish obligations to the Comanche.

As the Comanche prepared to return home, a crisis occurred. The Lipan were infuriated by the peace treaty and 158 warriors gathered outside San Antonio to attack the Comanche chiefs on their way home. Governor Cabello quickly assembled the forces available to him, 42 soldiers and 10 militiamen, to escort the Comanche. On October 19, 1785, the Comanche, chiefs dressed in Spanish officers' uniforms gifted them, wives adorned in Spanish finery, and their escort departed San Antonio. Chaves accompanied the group which arrived safely in Comancheria.

== Treaty with the western Comanche ==
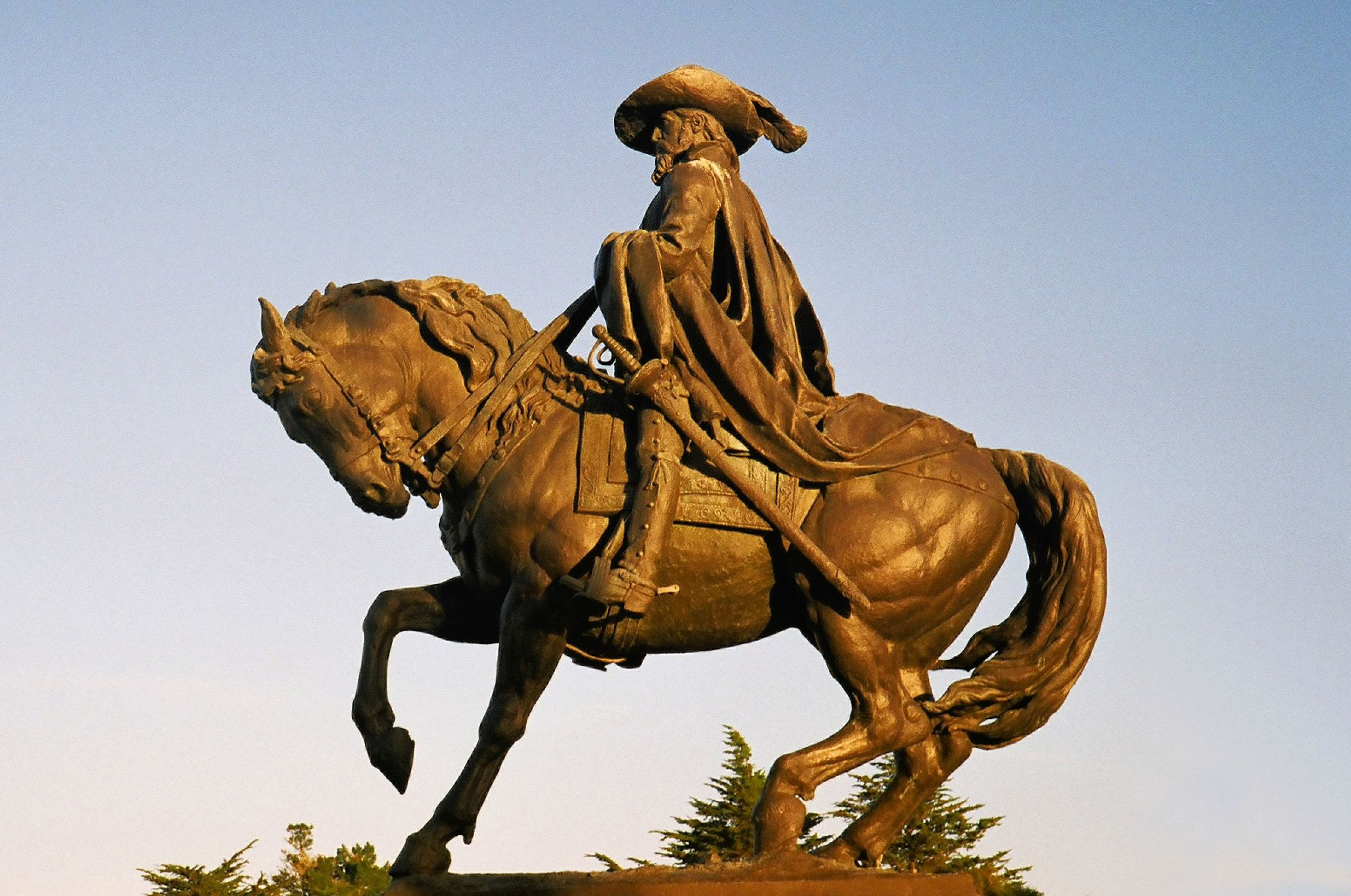
Juan Bautista de Anza

The western Comanche had both traded with and raided the Spanish colony of New Mexico. Some bands of the Comanche were often trading with the Spanish in Taos while others were raiding other parts of the colony. The treaty of the eastern Comanche with the Spanish in Texas caused the western Comanche to consider reaching a similar agreement with the Spanish in New Mexico. The first problem of the Comanche was to reconcile their peace and war factions. The peace group assassinated Toroblanco, an implacable enemy of the Spanish. The Comanche then held a conference of 600 rancherias (family groups) along the Arkansas River in Colorado.

New Mexican governor Juan Bautista de Anza demanded that the Comanche speak with one voice in seeking peace. The rancheria representatives selected Ecueracapa ("Iron Shirt", a reference to the Spanish armor he wore in battle), a distinguished warrior, to represent all of them in seeking peace with New Mexico. Ecueracapa accepted the assignment, but warned that, if any Comanche violated the terms of an agreement he negotiated, he would join with the Spanish to punish them. On December 10, 1785, the western Comanche began their search for peace by capturing a New Mexican subject, Jose Chiquito, who spoke the Comanche language. They treated Chiquito well and sent him to the New Mexican capital of Santa Fe with a message that Ecueracapa was the designated representation of the Comanche and requested safe passage for him to meet with the governor. De Anza accepted and sent a return delegation with gifts to Ecueracapa,

A complication arose when a small band of Comanche killed a Pecos Indian, a subject of Spain. Ecueracapa executed the leader of the band as a sign of his good will toward the Spanish. The Utes, friends of the Spanish and enemies of the Comanche, were worried that a Spanish/Comanche peace agreement would disadvantage them. De Anza pacified them by including several Utes among the group to negotiate with the Comanche. On February 25, 1786, Ecueracapa entered Santa Fe with due ceremony and met with the governor. De Anza first negotiated a peace agreement between the Utes and Comanche, and on February 28 de Anza, Ecueracura, and a large delegation of Spanish, Comanche, and Ute set out for Pecos where the formal negotiations for a treaty would be held. Two hundred Comanche chiefs waited in Pecos to participate.

Ecueracapa requested that the Spanish allow the Comanche to trade in Santa Fe and Pecos as well as Taos. De Anza agreed. Both sides favored Spanish and Comanche cooperation in a war against their common enemy, the Apache. De Anza celebrated the agreement with a trade fair in Pecos in which the Spanish traded iron goods and bread to the Comanche in exchange for bison robes and horses. De Anza reduced the prices charged the Comanche for knives and other products. On March 3, the conference concluded with amity and the two sides retired to their respective homes.

== Consequences ==
Both sides benefitted from the treaties. Spanish settlement in New Mexico, long confined to the Rio Grande valley because of Comanche and Apache raids, expanded and the population increased. Spanish traders (Comancheros) and bison hunters (Ciboleros) began to venture onto the Great Plains. The New Mexicans also soon made peace with the Navajo on their western frontier, adding to the security of the formerly-beleaguered colony.

The Comanche benefited from the trade with New Mexico, including trade in guns. Having a friendly relationship with the Spanish in Texas enabled the Comanche to push the Lipan Apaches further south into Mexico. Peace with New Mexico and Texas also freed warriors to defend Comancheria from the encroachments of eastern and northern enemies, especially the Osage and the Pawnee. Ecueracapa was killed in 1793 in a battle with the Pawnee.

The treaty essentially made Spanish New Mexico a protectorate of Comancheria, at the expense of the rest of New Spain, especially Texas. Comanche would raid the rest of New Spain for goods, horses, and people, and would trade them in New Mexico. As a result, the New Mexico treaty was more successful than the Texas treaty in keeping the peace between the Spanish and Comanches. The peace treaty with Texas lasted until 1801 when a Spaniard killed a Comanche which initiated a decade of renewed violence. The treaties with both Texas and New Mexico were under stress with the Mexican War of Independence which began in 1810. As Mexico fought for independence from Spain, it lacked the organization and resources to reward the Comanche with the gifts and the trade they expected. Nevertheless, Comanche peace and trade with New Mexico endured. From the 1830s until 1870 the Comanches both fought with Texans and used Texas as a safe haven as they raided hundreds of miles deep into Mexico to capture horses, mules, and other livestock. They traded the horses and mules to Anglo Americans advancing westward as well as augmenting their own large herds.

== See also ==
- Comanche history
- Comanche-Mexico War
- Comanche Wars
- Spanish Texas
