= Comanche–Mexico Wars =

Series of Conflicts Between the Comanche peoples and Mexico

Comanche–Mexican Wars
- Part of the Comanche Wars
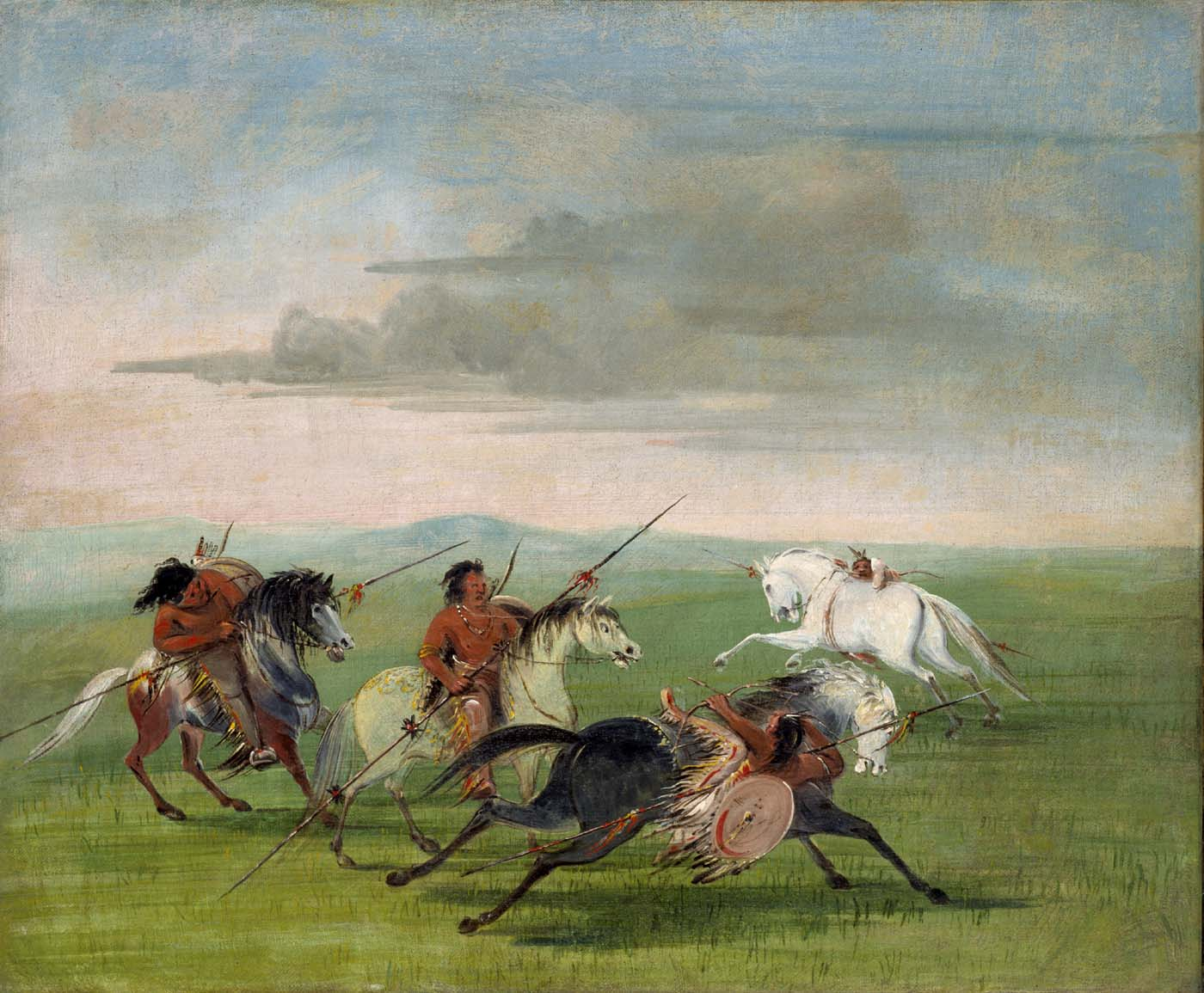
- The Comanche were famous for their horsemanship. By George Catlin, 1835.
Date	1821 – c. 1870
Location	Chihuahua, Durango, Nuevo Leon, Zacatecas, Tamaulipas, and San Luis Potosi.
Result	Many successful raids by Comanche

Belligerents
Mexico	Comanche; Kiowa; Kiowa Apache

The Comanche–Mexico Wars was the Mexican theater of the Comanche Wars, a series of conflicts from 1821 to 1870. The Comanche and their Kiowa and Kiowa Apache allies carried out large-scale raids hundreds of miles deep into Mexico. The raids were stimulated by the desire of Comanches to accumulate wealth through plunder, principally horses, mules, and Mexican captives for ransom or slaves who became integrated into the tribe. The raids escalated proportionally to Mexico's inability to defend its citizens during the turbulent years after it gained independence in 1821 and a large and growing market in the United States for stolen Mexican horses and cattle.

The Comanche launched their raids from Texas, usually in autumn. In Texas, a full moon in September was known as a "Comanche Moon" as the mounted Comanche raiders rode south to Mexico at night by the light of the moon. Comanche raids usually consisted of 200 to 800 warriors. The raiders penetrated 400 miles (640 km) into Mexico south of the Rio Grande. Forty-four raids are recorded from 1831 to 1848. During that period, the Comanche killed more than 2,600 Mexicans, captured more than 800 people, and stole more than 100,000 head of livestock. The Mexican defenders killed more than 700 Comanches.

When the US Army invaded northern Mexico in 1846 during the Mexican–American War, the region was devastated. After the mid-1850s Comanche raids into Mexico declined in size and intensity. Comanche power diminished due to a cholera epidemic in 1849, encroachment on their lands in Texas by white settlers, the near-extinction of the bison which was their principal source of food, and the U.S. Army's campaigns against them. The last known Comanche raid into Mexico was in 1870. In 1875, the U.S. army defeated the Comanches and forced them to live on a reservation in Oklahoma.

== Background ==
In the words of U.S. Army General James Wilkinson, the Comanche were "the most powerful nation of savages on this continent." That power would be amply demonstrated as the United States and the newly independent country of Mexico contested ownership of Texas and much of the area now known as the southwestern U.S. The Comanche considered themselves owners of a 500-by-400-mile (800 by 640 km) block of land that stretched from the Arkansas River in Colorado to near the Rio Grande in Texas. In the early nineteenth century, perhaps 20,000 Comanche shared this land, called Comancheria, with 2,000 Kiowa and 300 Plains Apache (Kiowa Apache). They sometimes granted hunting rights to other tribes, such as the Wichita.

The Comanche came to the attention of the Spanish in the province Santa Fe de Nuevo México (New Mexico) in 1706. Conflicts led to punitive expedition by Juan Bautista de Anza in 1779, resulting a battle in eastern Colorado in which the Comanche leader Greenhorn was killed. Peace treaties were concluded with their eastern bands by Pedro Vial and Francisco Xavier Chaves in 1785 and their western bands in 1786. The Spanish welcomed the Comanche as an ally against the Apache, forgave their transgressions, traded manufactured items and corn to them for horses, captives, and buffalo meat, and showered them with gifts. The mutually beneficial relationship between Spaniards and Comanches began to come apart in 1821 when Mexico won its independence from Spain. The new country had no resources to continue paying tribute to the Comanche and was embroiled in domestic political disputes rather than paying attention to troubles on its northern frontier.

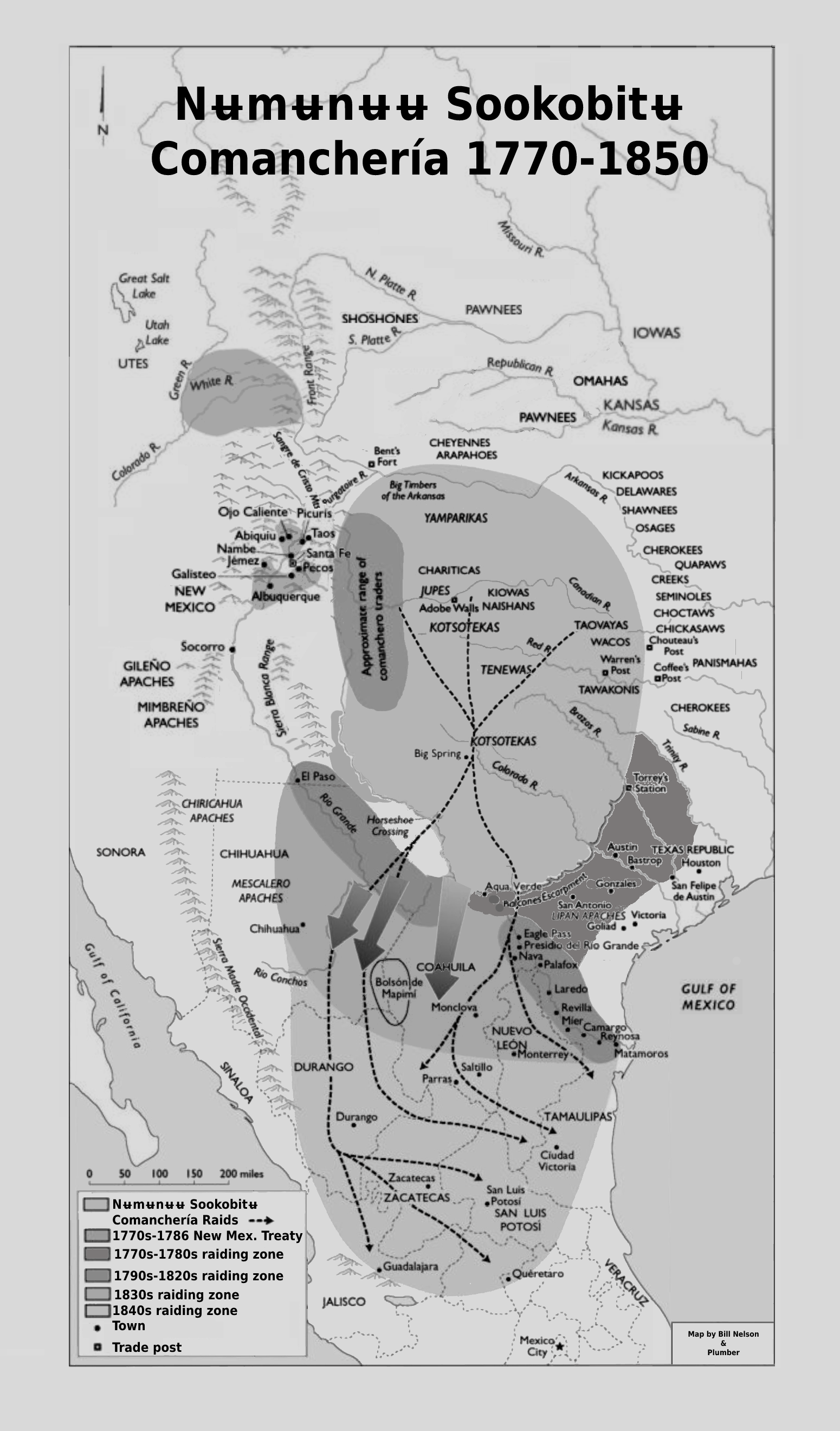
The approximate boundaries of Comancheria and its raiding hinterland in Mexico.

The Comanche, for their part, in the 1820s and 1830s were under intense pressure from competitors. The Osage were formidable enemies. The expulsion by the U.S. and the migration west to Oklahoma by the Five civilized tribes, the Shawnee, and the Delaware brought them into competition with the Comanche on the Great Plains. The Comanche lost several battles with the Osage and the eastern Indian tribes who were generally better armed.

Anglo-Americans arrived on the heels of the eastern Indians. Traders journeyed in increasing numbers along the Santa Fe Trail across the northern border of Comancheria and Anglo hunters depleted the buffalo herds in that vicinity. Northern Plains Indians such as the Cheyenne and Arapaho pressed south, drawn by Bent's Fort and the herds of feral horses on the southern Great Plains. They were equal to the Comanche in their skills as mounted warriors. Comanche numbers were also declining from epidemics of European diseases. Comanche interests dictated peace with the Mexicans so threats from other Indians and Anglo-Americans could be addressed. On several occasions in the 1820s the Comanche attempted to obtain Mexican military assistance to repel the Indian invaders of their land, but their requests were denied. As they had often aided the Mexicans in the past to fight their mutual enemies, the Apache, the Mexican government's denial undermined the Comanches' commitment to peace with Mexico. However, as an inducement to peaceful relations, Mexican provincial governments made haste to strengthen trade ties with the Comanche in the early 1830s.

An important factor encouraging Comanche raids of Mexican ranches was the huge demand for horses and mules by the Anglo-Americans now flooding into lands west of the Mississippi River. The Comanches could meet that demand by breeding and selling horses from their herds, capturing and training wild horses from the herds in Comancheria, or raiding Mexican ranches and taking horses. The last was often the preferred option of ambitious young men striving to become rich in a pastoral society. Comanche raids for horses in Texas and along the Rio Grande in Mexico increased in 1831 and afterwards. A young, poor Comanche man could better his circumstances—albeit at risk to his life—by raiding for horses and human captives. The wealth he obtained would enable him to buy a Comanche wife—or he might find a first, second, or third wife among the captives.

The Mexican government accused the U.S. and independent Texas of encouraging Comanche raids, especially by trading guns to the Comanche in exchange for horses. In 1826, a Mexican official appealed to the U.S. to stop the "traders in blood who put instruments of death in the hands of those barbarians." In 1835, the state of Chihuahua, ravaged by Apache as well as Comanche raids, offered a bounty of 100 pesos (about U.S.$100) for each scalp of a hostile Indian man and lesser amounts for women and children. Anglo American and Indian, primarily Delaware and Shawnee, scalp hunters killed many Apache and peaceful Indians for the bounty over the next few years, but apparently had little success in hunting down and killing Comanches.

== Comanche diplomacy ==
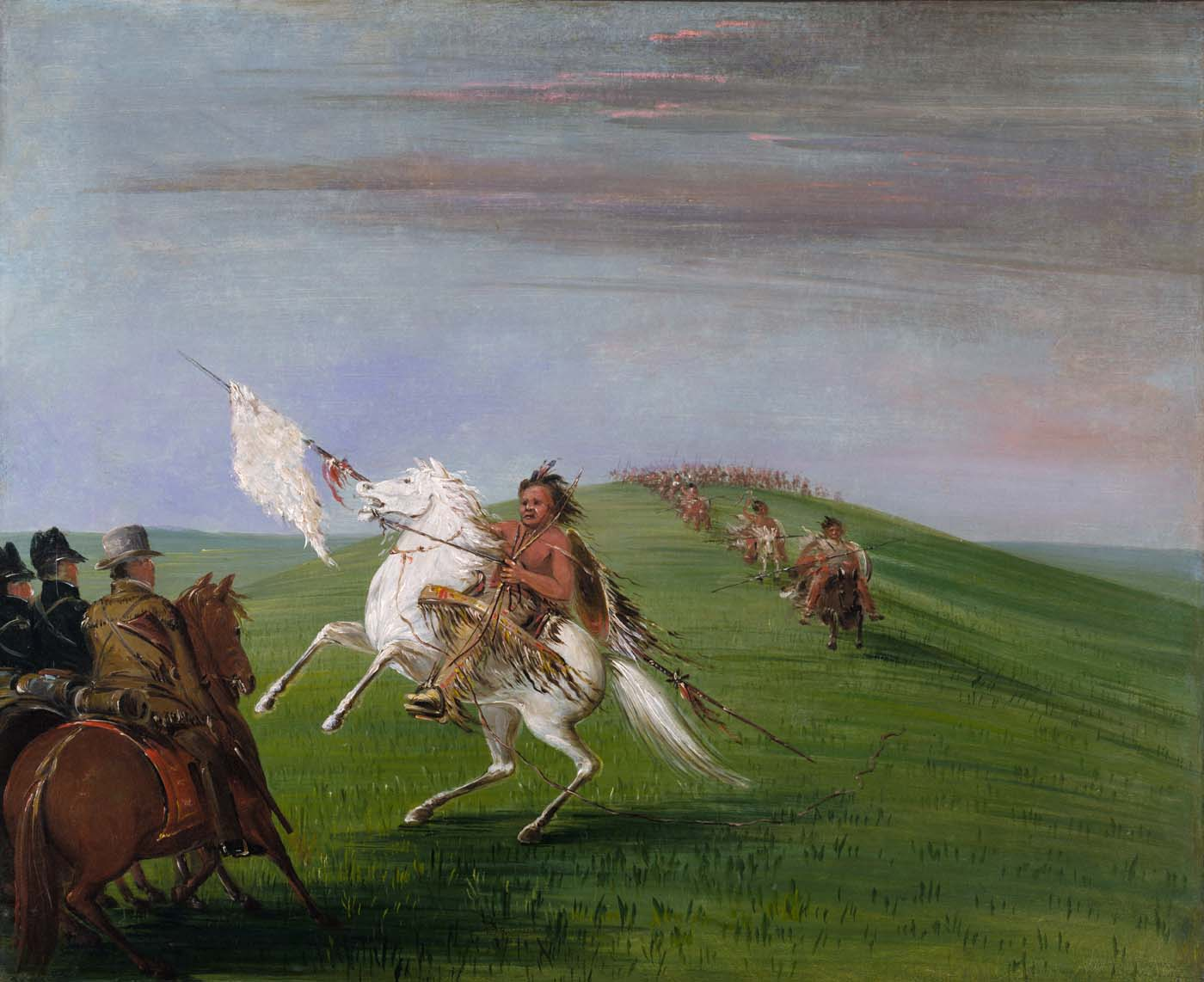
Comanches meeting the U.S. dragoons near the Wichita Mountains in 1835 by George Catlin.

The Comanche resolved most of the challenges facing them in the 1830s with adroit diplomacy. Their strategy was flexible. With New Mexico, a Mexican province to their west, they enjoyed friendly trading relations. New Mexico was more of an asset than a threat to the Comanches and the New Mexicans avoided war with the Indians. In 1841 Governor Manuel Armijo was ordered by the Mexican central government to join a military campaign against the Comanche, but Armijo declined. "To declare war on the Comanches would bring complete ruin to the Department of New Mexico." In 1844, New Mexican officials learned of but did nothing to prevent a Comanche raid on Chihuahua.

With their western flank secured by an unthreatening New Mexico, the Comanche dealt with rivals on their northern and eastern borders. In 1835, they met with a delegation of U.S. soldiers and eastern Indians in the Wichita Mountains of Oklahoma and concluded a peace agreement. The agreement permitted eastern Indians and Anglo-Americans to hunt on Comanche lands and did not restrain the Comanche and their Kiowa and Wichita allies from making war on Mexico. With their eastern flank secured by the treaty with the U.S., the Comanches next concluded a peace agreement in 1840 with the Southern Cheyenne and Arapaho pressing on them from the north. It was highly favorable to the Cheyenne and Arapaho. They were permitted to reside and hunt on the buffalo and horse-rich Comanche lands and, in addition, the affluent Comanches gave them gifts, including as many as six horses to every Cheyenne and Arapaho man. The Comanche welcome to the southern bands of these two tribes, numbering more than 2,500, was both an acknowledgment that they were formidable rivals and also that the Comanche were short on men and resources to maintain their control over Comancheria.

South and southeast of Comancheria were the fast-growing Anglo-American communities in the Mexican territory of Texas. In the 1820s and 1830s most Comanche raids were in the southern parts of Texas and affected the largely Hispanic population around San Antonio, Laredo and Goliad. After the Texas Revolution asserting independence from Mexico in 1836, the Comanche had to deal with the new Republic of Texas. Texas's first President, Sam Houston, was knowledgeable about Indians and favored a policy of accommodation with the Comanche.

Continued Comanche raids led to the election in 1838 of Mirabeau B. Lamar who favored a more aggressive approach. The massacre of 35 Comanche chiefs attending a peace conference in San Antonio in March 1840 set off a series of bloody reprisals and battles. Hundreds of Comanches descended upon and destroyed the towns of Victoria and Linnville in 1840 (see Great Raid of 1840). Although the Texans demonstrated they could punish the Comanche (See Battle of Plum Creek) military campaigns emptied their treasury and Texas became more accommodating. (See Texas-Indian Wars) In 1844, the Texans and the Comanches came to an agreement which recognized Comanche lands and left Comancheria intact.

What the agreements with the United States and neighboring tribes and a hiatus in the struggle with Texas accomplished was to free up the Comanche to make unrestrained war on the Mexican provinces south of the Rio Grande. As the 1830s demonstrated, the Texans, the United States, and neighboring tribes all had the ability to invade Comancheria and attack the Comanche homeland. Mexico, by contrast, was rich in horses and unable to counterattack due to distance and the fact that, after 1836, any Mexican military offensive against the Comanches would have to enter Texas and Mexico had a hostile relationship with its former colony. In attacking Mexico, the Comanche were motivated by opportunity and economics. The Comanches found it profitable to establish trade relationships with the United States and the Mexican state of New Mexico. They needed guns and other goods from the Americans and New Mexicans and in Mexico they captured livestock and people to trade. At the same time the bison population was decreasing due to over-hunting by both Indians and whites, and in times of scarcity the Comanche ate some of the horses in their vast herds. Taos, New Mexico was one trading center. Bent's Fort in Colorado was another. The Bents' bought captives to use as herders and laborers and they bought horses and mules from the Comanche for six dollars a head—and marketed them in Missouri for 60 dollars a head.

== Comanche raids ==
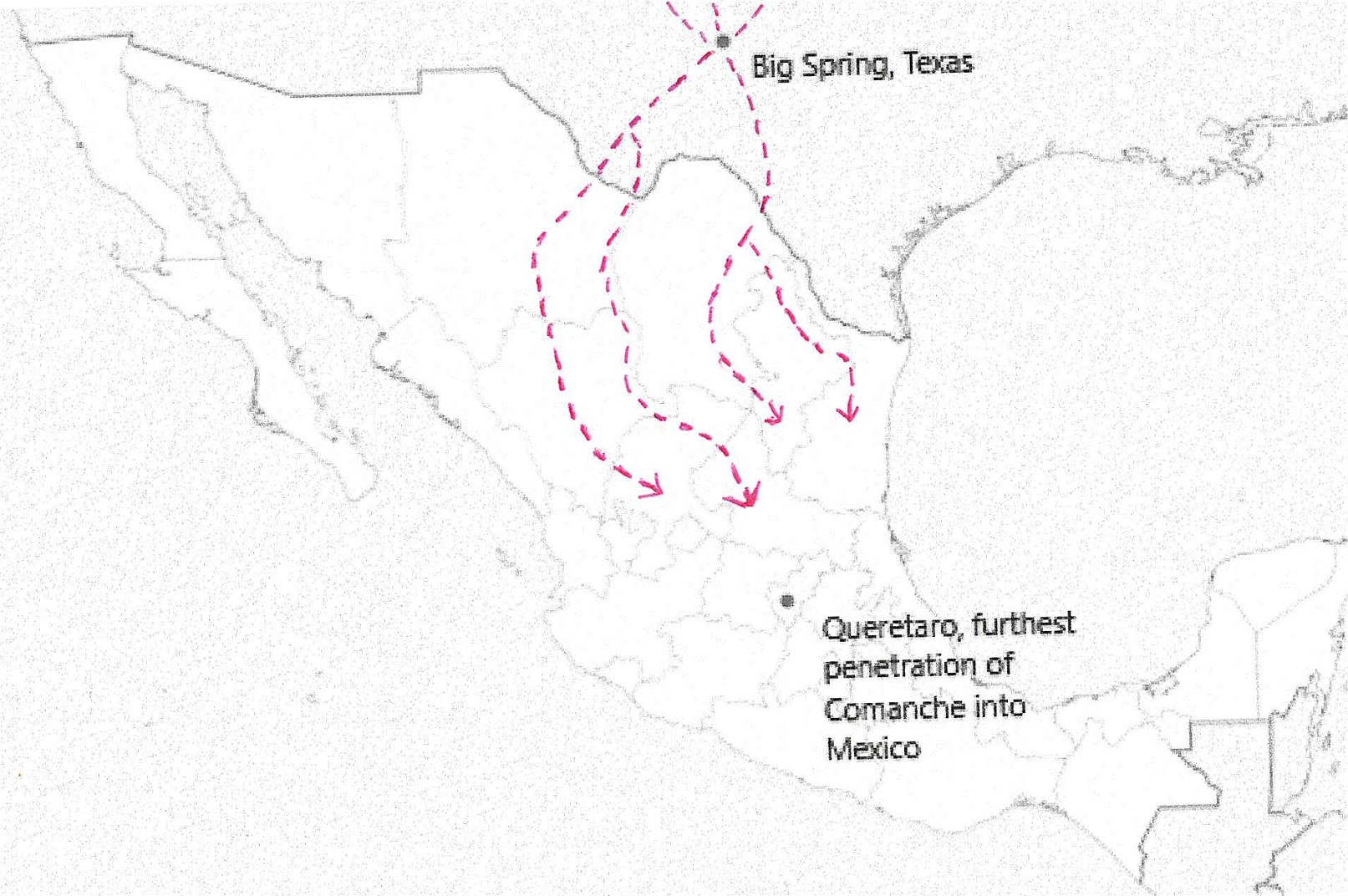
Comanche raids into Mexico usually started in Big Spring, Texas and penetrated by several routes deep into Mexico.

Comanche raids before 1840 had generally penetrated only a short distance south of the Rio Grande and had usually resulted in only a few deaths and the theft of a few thousand livestock. The threat, however, from the Comanche was serious enough in 1826 in northern Nuevo León, that the Governor issued orders that no one should venture out of villages into the countryside except in groups of at least thirty armed men.

In the 1840s, Comanche raids became larger, more deadly, and penetrated deeply into Mexico. In September 1840 and continuing until March 1841 came the first of the great raids. During this period six Comanche armies each numbering between two hundred and eight hundred warriors invaded northern Mexico. The most far reaching of these raids reached the region of San Luis Potosí and Zacatecas 400 miles south of the Big Bend, their most common crossing point into Mexico. 472 Mexicans were reported killed and more than 100 captives were taken from these six raids. Many others were left homeless, their livelihoods destroyed, their livestock stolen or killed. So much wealth did the Comanches obtain that the number of raids dropped off slightly for the next three years, but resumed even more intensely between 1844 and 1848—after the Comanches had made peace with Texas.

They [the Comanche] are now overrunning the whole departments of Durango and Chihuahua, have cut off all communication, and defeated...the regular troops sent against them. Upwards of ten thousand head of horses and mules have already been carried off, and scarcely has a hacienda or rancho on the frontier been unvisited, and every where the people have been killed or captured. The roads are impassible, all traffik is stopped, the ranchos barricaded, and the inhabitants afraid to venture out of their doors.

— George Ruxton, 1846

The Comanche conducted their raids in Mexico with no risk of retaliation by Mexico in their home territory north of the Rio Grande in Texas. Moreover, the Federal government of Mexico, embroiled in political disputes, gave little assistance to its northern states and their citizens to fend off the Comanche. Poorly-armed militia, organized by state and local governments and large ranchers, and hired scalp-hunters—often Anglo-Americans or other Indians—opposed the Comanche raids. Durango in 1847 adopted a bounty system, paying 50 pesos for the head of a hostile Indian. In 1849, the bounty was raised to 200 pesos per head, more than a laborer could make in wages in a full year.

A careful, but incomplete tally, of the Mexican victims of Comanche raids shows that between 1831 and 1848 a total of 44 raids of more than 100 men each were sent into Mexico. The victims of these raids amounted to 2,649 dead and 852 captives, of whom 580 were redeemed. The number of livestock stolen surely amounted to more than 100,000. What livestock the Comanche could not steal, they killed. The Comanche, on their part, suffered heavy casualties because they often seemed to seek out a fight rather than just raiding. 702 Comanche dead are known and 32 were taken prisoner. Comanches would also suffer from diseases brought back by Mexican captives. The bloodiest raiding year was July 1845 – June 1846 when 652 Mexicans and 48 Comanches were recorded as killed. The Comanches had turned northern Mexico into a "semicolonized landscape of extraction from which they could mine resources with little cost."

The Comanche have often been portrayed by historians in the U.S. as a simple and crude tribe lacking any coherent political organization or authority. Their success in creating an empire of the Plains, sophisticated diplomacy, and highly organized raids on Mexico contradicts that opinion. The numerous small Comanche bands came together in summer, usually on the Red River or one of its tributaries in Texas or Oklahoma to formulate plans and organize groups of raiders. Comanches came all the way from the Arkansas River in Colorado to join the raids. Among the raiders were Kiowa, Kiowa-Apache, and other Indians plus a few Mexicans and Anglos.

In fall, small groups of Comanche rendezvoused at Big Spring and headed south along well-known trails, riding at night during the full moon. A full moon in the fall was called a "Comanche Moon" by Texans. They crossed the Rio Grande either east or west of the Big Bend and met up and united in the Bolson de Mapimi, a large empty desert and range region. The Bolson offered good grazing, abundant springs, and mild winter temperatures. Many Comanche men brought their families south with them and resided for a winter there in the safety of its vastness.

From the Bolson, the Comanche branched out in all directions in small and large groups, expanding their range to raid into tropical Mexico as far south as Jalisco and Querétaro. Each warrior took three or four horses with him, saving his favorite for battle. Women and children commonly traveled with the men and were prepared to defend themselves if necessary. A weakness of the Comanche was their determination to recover the bodies of their fallen warriors. They took extreme risks and suffered additional casualties as a result. Moreover, they often seemed careless and were sometimes caught unawares by large contingents of Mexican soldiers.

At the end of their yearly raids, usually in the late winter or spring, the Comanche drove their captured livestock back to Texas. They sold or traded the horses and mules at several American trading posts as far north as Bent's Fort in Colorado. They needed the captives, mostly women and children, as laborers. The boys were put to work taking care of their horse herds. The girls assisted in household chores, including preparing buffalo skins for sale as robes. The boys often grew up to be Comanche warriors and the girls often became one of several wives of Comanche men. A few of the captives were ransomed. The treatment of slaves was sometimes brutal, but the Comanches integrated thousands of Mexicans, Anglos, and members of other Indian tribes into their society. They needed the workers as their population was decimated every few years by epidemics of smallpox and other diseases of European origin. Many of the slaves and other people adopted into the tribe became culturally Comanche, albeit with a social stigma due to not being born as Comanche.

== Mexican defenses ==
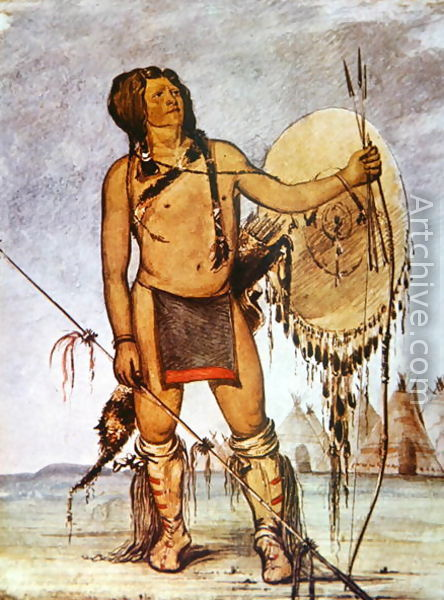
A Comanche warrior by George Catlin, 1835

The disarray in Mexico for the decades following its independence in 1821 precluded much assistance from the Mexican central government to its embattled northland. The old system of presidios (military bases) staffed by soldiers and scattered around the frontier deteriorated and most defense relied on locally recruited and equipped militia. The militias were poorly-armed and equipped. The Comanche were better armed with newer firearms purchased from American traders with stolen Mexican livestock. In the state of Nuevo Leon militia forces to combat the Indians totaled more than 1,000 men. In 1852, an even larger force of 2,000 cavalry was assembled in Nuevo Leon and confronted the Comanche in ten engagements which, while not very successful in killing or capturing Comanche, disrupted the raiders. Periodic epidemics of smallpox and cholera which killed many Comanche also thinned the numbers of the Mexican defenders.

In 1848, the government of Mexico turned its attention to the Indian raids, allocated more money, and stationed more soldiers in the impacted northern states. To bolster defenses, Mexico granted land to bands of North American Indian tribes such as the Seminole (originally from Florida) and Kickapoo (originally from the Great Lakes region of the United States), plus "free Negroes" (African-Americans) who were runaway slaves living among the Seminoles. In 1850, more than 700 of the Seminole, Kickapoo, and African-Americans agreed to assist in the defense against Comanche raiders in exchange for land to settle in the Mexican state of Coahuila. The Kickapoo launched a few raids into Texas, part of the United States since 1845, to steal livestock. The Kickapoo used Mexico as a sanctuary without risk of American retaliation, just as the Comanche used Texas as a sanctuary free from the risk of Mexican retaliation.

Other Indian peoples aiding in the Mexican defense against the Comanche were transplanted Tlaxcalans, who had allied with the Spanish to defeat the Aztecs and had long been allies of the Spanish in settling frontier regions, the Alazapa, Tarascans, and Otomis.

== Impact on Mexico ==
In 1841, a Mexican soldier, veteran of wars with the Comanche, stated to Fanny Calderón de la Barca "his firm conviction we should see [the Comanche] on the streets of Mexico [City] one of these days." The Legislature of Chihuahua described the situation it faced in 1846. "We travel the roads…at their [i.e., the Comanches and Apaches] whim; we cultivate the land where they wish and in the amount they wish; we use sparingly things they have left to us until the moment that it strikes their appetite to take them for themselves." In 1847, 200 Comanches were bold enough to parade through the city of Durango and depart unchallenged.

It is our wish to see you liberated from despots, to drive back the savage Comanches, to prevent the renewal of their assaults, and to compel them to restore to you from captivity your long lost wives and children.

— U.S. General Zachary Taylor to the Mexican people on invading northern Mexico, 1846

Also, in 1847, traveler Josiah Gregg said that "the whole country from New Mexico to the borders of Durango is almost entirely depopulated. The haciendas and ranchos have been mostly abandoned, and the people chiefly confined to the towns and cities." When American troops invaded northern Mexico in 1846 and 1847 they found a devastated landscape and a demoralized people. There was little resistance to the Anglo-Americans. Some Mexicans in the north perhaps hoped that the U.S. would be more successful in fighting the "barbarians" than Mexican forces had been. The U.S. victory in the Mexican–American War (1846–48) resulted in Mexico ceding vast territory to the U.S. and presented the Comanche with new challenges.

== Aftermath ==
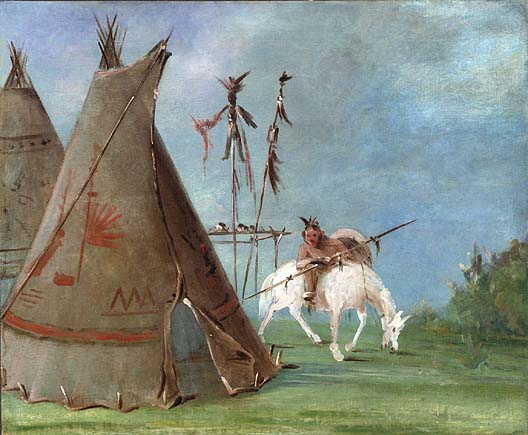
Comanche tipis and a mounted warrior. By George Catlin, 1835

Comanche raids into Mexico did not cease with the end of the Mexican–American War in 1848, but the Comanche faced a new situation as the U.S. took over the future states of California, Arizona, and New Mexico. One of the few benefits Mexico derived under the Treaty of Guadalupe Hidalgo, that ended the war, was a pledge from the United States that it would police the border to prevent Indian invasions of Mexico. Further, the U.S. would outlaw all trade in goods and property looted from Mexicans by Indian raiders and promised to return Mexican captives to Mexico. Despite enormous expenditure, the U.S. had little more success in curtailing Comanche and Apache raids than Mexico had. If anything the tempo of the raids increased in the 1850s. In 1852, in perhaps the most far-ranging of all the raids, the Comanche reached the Mexican state of Jalisco in the tropics near the Pacific Ocean, 600 miles (970 km) from their usual crossing point of the Rio Grande, near Presidio, Texas, and nearly 1,000 miles (1,600 km) from their Great Plains homeland. The obligation of the U.S. to counter the raids was abrogated by mutual assent in 1853. By 1856, authorities in horse-rich Durango would claim that Indian raids, mostly Comanche, in their state had taken nearly 6,000 lives, abducted 748 people, and forced the abandonment of 358 settlements over the previous 20 years.

The Comanche reached the peak of their power in the late 1840s and declined quickly. In 1849 a cholera epidemic among the Plains Indians killed thousands of Comanches and their allies. The 1850s saw a drought that had a severe impact on buffalo herds – already under pressure from market hunting – in Comancheria. The Comanche's huge horse herds put further pressure on the environment of their homeland. Soon, the Comanche were eating their horses as food. The fast-growing population of Texas – 600,000 by 1860 – encroached on Comanche lands. The U.S. army established five frontier garrisons within the borders of Comancheria, inhibiting their mobility and reducing their range. By the end of the 1850s the Comanche population had been reduced by about one-half what it had been before 1849. During the American Civil War (1861–1865) the Comanche would push back the Texas frontier and reclaim some of their territory. The last Comanche raid into Mexico may have been in 1870 when the Comanche reportedly killed 30 persons near Lampazos, Nuevo Leon. After the Civil War the Comanche were overwhelmed and the last of them, now reduced to about 1,500 people, surrendered to the U.S. army in 1875. Their long-term raiding partners, the Kiowa and Kiowa-Apache, also surrendered.

== Bibliography ==
- Adams, David B. Ëmbattled Borderland: Northern Nuevo León and the Indios Bárbaros, 1686–1870" The Southwestern Historical Quarterly, Vol 95, No. 2 (Oct 1991), pp. 205–220
- Brooks, James F. Captives and Cousins: Slavery, Kinship, and Community in the Southwest Borderlands Chapel Hill: U of NC Press, 2002
- DeLay, Brian, The War of a Thousand Deserts. New Haven: Yale U Press, 2008
- DeLay, Brian, "The Wider World of the Handsome Man: Southern Plains Indians Invade Mexico, 1830-1848." Journal of the Early Republic, Vol. 27, No. 1, Spring 2007, pp. 83–113
- Hamalainen, Pekka, The Comanche Empire. New Haven: Yale U Press, 2009
- Hoig, Stan, Beyond the Frontier: Exploring the Indian Country. Norman: U of OK Press, 1998
- Smith, Ralph A. "The Comanche Bridge between Oklahoma and Mexico, 1843–1844." The Chronicles of Oklahoma, Vol 39, No. 1, 1961
- Weber, David J. The Mexican Frontier, 1821–1846, Albuquerque: U of NM Press, 1982
