= Texas Science and Natural History Museum =

Texas Science & Natural History Museum
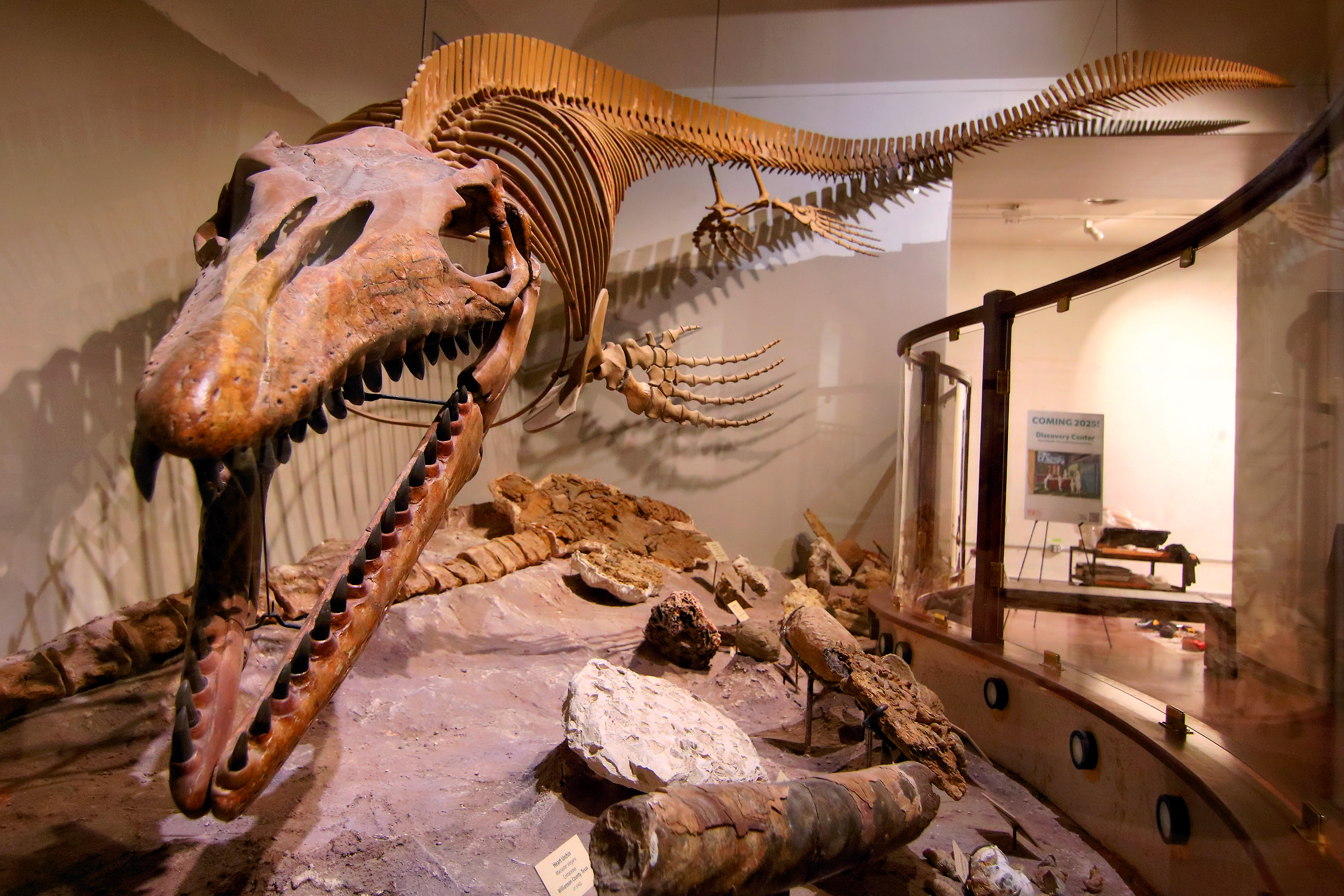
- Onion Creek Mosasaur skeleton
- Established: 1939
- Location: 2400 Trinity Street; Austin, Texas
- Coordinates: 30.2870°N 97.7324°W
- Type: Natural history museum
- Owner: The University of Texas at Austin

Texas Science & Natural History Museum is located on the campus of The University of Texas at Austin in Austin, Texas, U.S. It opened as Texas Memorial Museum during preparations for the Texas Centennial Exposition held in 1936. The museum's focus is on natural history, including paleontology, geology, biology, herpetology, ichthyology and entomology. Texas Memorial Museum building was designed in the Art Deco style by John F. Staub, with Paul Cret as supervising architect. Ground was broken for the building by President Franklin D. Roosevelt in January 1936. The museum was opened on January 15, 1939.

The museum won "Best of Austin" awards from the Austin Chronicle in 2002, 2005, and 2012.

The museum had exhibits on Texas history, anthropology, geography, and ethnography, but these were relocated to other museums (including the Bullock Texas State History Museum) in 2001. In October 2013, Linda Hicke, the dean of Austin's College of Natural Sciences, cut the museum's funding by $400,000.

The museum closed in 2022 for extensive renovations. It underwent a re-branding and became Texas Science & Natural History Museum. The museum reopened on September 23, 2023.

== Wichita County Meteorite ==
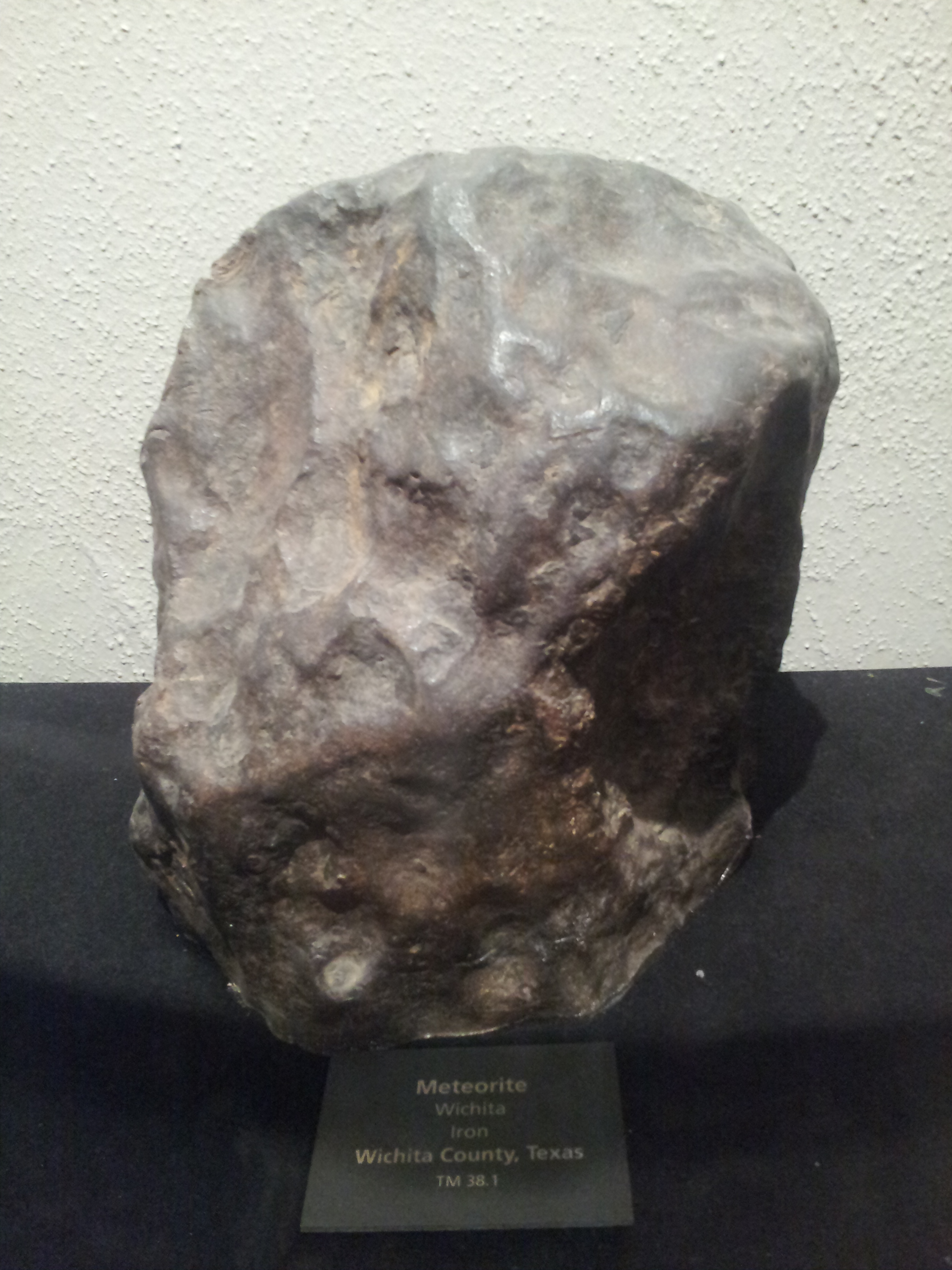
Wichita County Meteorite: 2 feet long by 1 foot wide by 4-8 inches thick

In 1723, the Comanche defeated the Lipan Apache people in a nine-day battle along the Rio del Fierro (Wichita River). The River of Iron may be the location written about by Athanase de Mezieres in 1772, containing "a mass of metal which the Indians say is hard, thick, heavy, and composed of iron", which they "venerate...as an extraordinary manifestation of nature", the Comanche's calling it "Ta-pic-ta-carre [standing rock], Po-i-wisht-carre [standing metal], or Po-a-cat-le-pi-le-carre [medicine rock]", the general area containing a "large number of meteoric masses".

"According to the Indians, the mass was first discovered by the Spaniards, who made several ineffectual attempts to remove it on pack mules but were finally compelled to abandon it on account of its great weight. The Comanches at first endeavored to melt the mass by building large fires around it, but failing in this, they next attempted to break it in pieces, in which they were likewise unsuccessful; they then conceived the idea that it was a wonderful medicine stone and therefore worthy of their most profound regard...it was the custom of all who passed by to deposit upon it beads, arrowheads, tobacco, and other articles as offerings."

The Wichita County meteorite originally weighed 145 kg and was obtained by Major Robert Neighbors, US Indian agent at Fort Belknap, in 1858-1859, who presented it to the State Cabinet, and was displayed in the old Capitol building before it burned down, when this Coarse Octahedrite was turned over to the University of Texas. According to Neighbors, "When the meteorite was conveyed to the Indian reserve, the Comanches collected in great numbers around their valued medicine stone and, whilst manifesting their attachment by rubbing their arms, hands, and chests over it, earnestly besought Major Neighbors to permit them to keep it at the agency."

A sister meteorite weighing 742 kg, the Red River meteorite, was discovered in 1808 but this Medium Octahedrite now resides in the Yale Peabody Museum of Natural History.

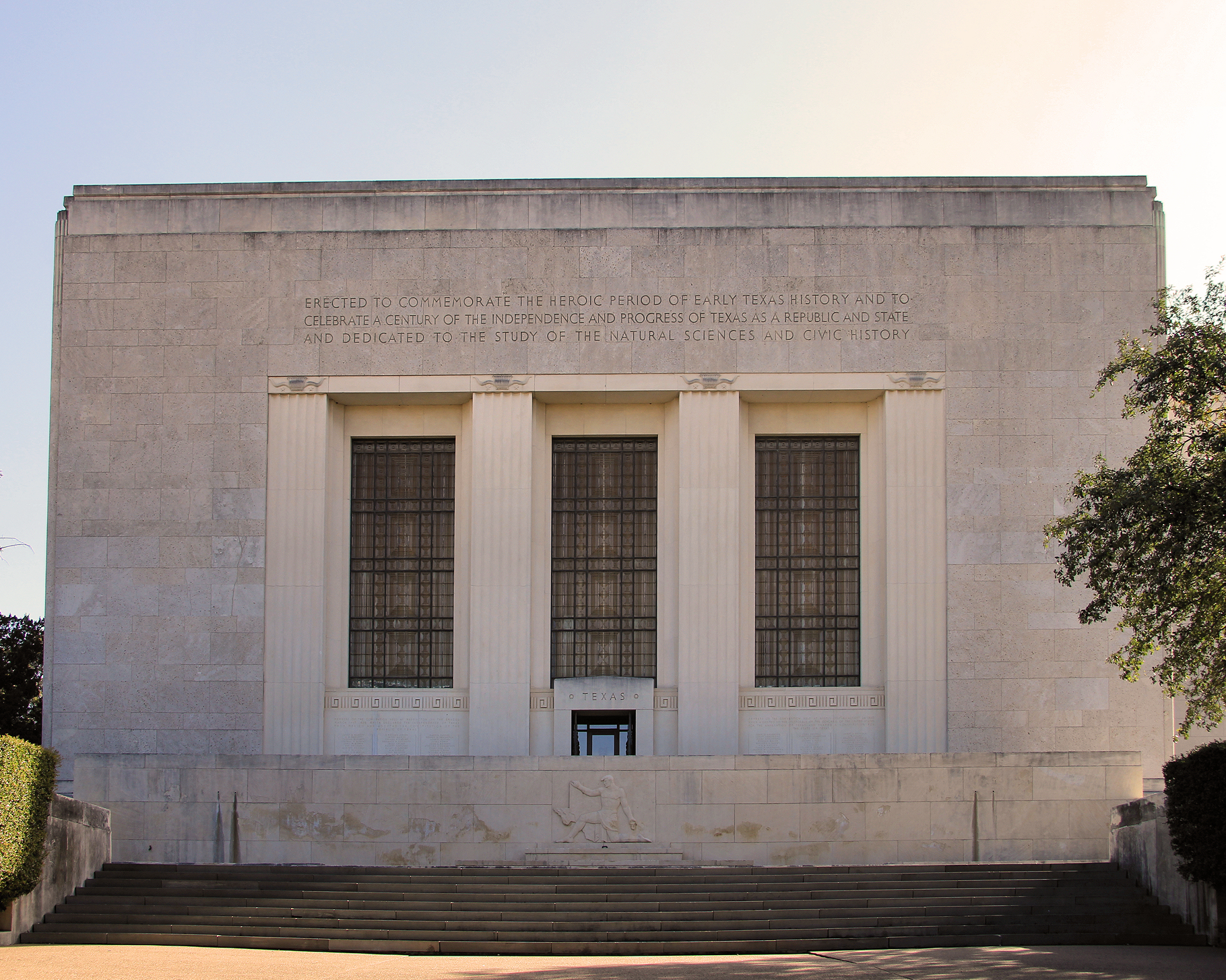
West elevation of the museum

== Bibliography ==
- Bolton, H. E. (1914). Athanase de Menzieres and the Louisiana-Texas Frontier, 1768-1780. Vol. 1. Cleveland: The Arthur H. Clark Company.
- Farrington, Oliver C. (1909). Meteorites of North America, to January 1, 1909. Vol. XIII. National Academy of Sciences. OCLC 1315050608.
