= Claude Charles du Tisné =

French soldier and Illinois Country explorer

- Born: c. 1681; Paris, France
- Died: 1730 (aged about 49); Illinois Country, New France
- Spouses: Marie-Anne Gaultier de Comporté (m. 1708; died 1711); Marguerite Margane de Lavalterie (m. 1713)
- Children: 3 sons
- Military career
- Allegiance: Kingdom of France
- Branch: Troupes de la Marine
- Service years: 1705–1730
- Rank: Captain
- Commands: Fort des Natchitoches (1716–1718); Fort de Chartres (1723–1725, 1729–1730); Fort Rosalie (1725–1729)
- Known for: Exploration of the Illinois Country
- Conflicts: Second Fox War

Claude Charles du Tisné (also Dutisné) led the first official French expedition to visit the Osage and the Wichita Indians in 1719 in what became known as Kansas in the present-day United States.

== Life ==
Claude Charles du Tisné was born in France around 1681 and went to Canada in 1705 as a soldier. He was sent to establish a fort on the Ohio River. He built up a reputation for competence and knowledge of the frontier and the Indians. In 1714, he assisted in the construction of Fort Rosalie among the Natchez people, and in 1716 he led construction of Fort des Natchitoches on the Red River. He served as commandant in Natchitoches for two years.

In 1719 his superiors instructed him to visit the Panis or Panioussa (Wichita) and the Padouca (Apache) as a first step toward establishing trade with the Spanish colony of Santa Fe in New Mexico. He was to make friends with these Indians, who were then unknown except by name to the French, and ensure that they posed no problems to such trade passing through their lands. What Du Tisné and the French did not know was that the leaders of New Mexico were opposed to any trade with the French.

== Missouria ==
Du Tisné and his small group of French and Indians left Kaskaskia, Illinois probably in May 1719, and journeyed by canoe up the Missouri River to the village of the Missouria Indians near where the small town of Miami is today. The French already knew some of the Missouria; they were a Siouan people, speaking a dialect of Chiwere, the language of the Winnebago, Oto, and Iowa peoples. This Missouria village had 100 houses, probably the same type of large bark-covered longhouse typical of the region. The total population was likely more than one thousand. Du Tisné said the Missouria stayed in the village only in the spring, an indication that they probably followed the same seasonal pattern as other nearby tribes of planting crops in the spring and journeying west to hunt buffalo in the summer. Du Tisné did not report the Missouria using horses, although most Plains tribes had adopted use of these animals by then.

On the south side of the Missouri River across from the Missouria was an Osage village. These were the "Little Osages" a splinter of the main group of Osage then living about 100 miles (160 km) away on the Osage River and its tributaries. They had split from the main Osage tribe a few years earlier and moved to the Missouri River for unknown reasons.

The Missouria were unhappy with the French, because French traders had been bypassing them. They stopped Du Tisné in his tracks, refusing to allow him and his party to proceed upriver from their village. They wanted to be the middlemen for French trade with Indians further up the river. They especially did not want French guns to fall into the hands of tribes who were, or could become, their enemies. Du Tisné had to turn around and return to Kaskaskia.

== Osage ==
Du Tisné made a second attempt later that summer to reach the plains by land. He proceeded straight west from Kaskaskia, through the Ozarks region, and after a journey of about 250 miles (400 km), he reached the village of the "Great Osages." The Osage village was in Vernon County, Missouri about four miles (6 km) from the Osage River atop a ridge amidst flat rich prairies. The village location is today commemorated as a State Historical Site.

The Osage also lived in longhouses. Du Tisné said the Osage had many horses "which they steal from the Pani and can be bought from them." They also had buffalo robes and deer skins to trade. Like the Missouria, the Osage had adopted the practice of the Indians of the plains border of journeying west to hunt buffalo, living in tipis during that time and leaving only the old, infirm, and small children in the village.

Du Tisné does not portray the Osage as numerous. Their village was about 100 houses and 200 warriors, numbers consistent with a population of little more than 1,000. Quite likely there were other Osage villages in the area of which du Tisné was not aware or did not visit.

Du Tisné was impressed with the physical size of the Osage, often more than six feet tall, and well-proportioned. They wore their hair in a scalp-lock. He was less impressed with their character, "in general they are traitors who easily break their promises." Du Tisné also commented on the dual nature of Osage politics and organization, the two moieties, the Hon-ga and Tsi-hzu; and the multiple clans and band that resulted in numerous Osage leaders, none of whom seemed to have much authority. Du Tisné's narrative does not suggest the power and prominence later achieved by the Osage.

Like the Missouria, the Osage were opposed to having Du Tisné pass through their territory to the villages of the Pawnee. Most of all they worried that the French would sell guns to the Pawnee. Finally, after extensive negotiations in which Du Tisné resorted to threats that the French would suspend trade relations, he was allowed to continue. He was permitted to take three guns for himself, three guns for his interpreter, and trade goods.

== Wichita ==
Finally departing with the grudging permission of the Osage, Du Tisné journeyed to visit the Wichita. Their two villages were four days and about 100 miles (160 km) away, probably on the Verdigris River near the site of the future town of Neodesha, Kansas. Two archaeological sites near here fit the profile of Du Tisné's narrative. "All the route was through prairies and hills, full of buffalos. The land was beautiful and well-wooded." Most early visitors exulted at the beauty of the tallgrass prairie. It was an airy and open release from the darkness and menace of the Eastern forests.

Du Tisné got a hostile welcome at the Wichita village. The Osage had sent a messenger ahead to warn the Wichita that he intended to enslave them. Du Tisné wrote that the Indians twice threatened him with a tomahawk twice over his head, but he persuaded them that his purpose was peaceful. As his entourage was small, the Wichita probably concluded that he was not dangerous. The concern of the Wichita was probably that Du Tisné was a slave trader.

The Wichita village—Du Tisné and other Frenchmen called them "Panis," a generic term for the Caddoan people of the plains, and a word that came to also mean "slave"—had 130 houses and 200 to 250 warriors, indicating a population of 1,000 or more. Another village about three miles (5 km) away was of similar size. The Wichita in the two villages possessed about 300 horses "which they esteem greatly and with which they do not wish to part." The Wichita, closer to the source of supply of the horses in New Mexico, had more horses than did the border tribes, the Osage, Kaw, and Missouria. Du Tisné said that the Wichita, borrowing the concept from the Spanish, armored their horses with leather for war. They still used bows and arrows for both hunting and war, although they also used lances tipped with the pointed end of Spanish swords.

The chief enemies of the Wichita were the Padoucas—Plains Apache—who ventured as close as six days' journey from the Wichita but lived fifteen days to the West. The physical distance was indeterminable, as the duration depended upon whether travel was by horse, on foot by hunters, or on foot with women and children. They said that the Spanish had formerly been in their village, but the Padouca barred the route to the Spanish settlements of Santa Fe, more than a month of travel away.

The Wichita war with the Padouca was continuous. Du Tisné noted that both sides practiced ritual cannibalism, which seems to have been a feature of Wichita culture, as was perhaps an occasional human sacrifice. Both tribes fought to acquire slaves and horses. Wichita slaves were traded in Santa Fe by the Apaches for horses; Padouca slaves were traded by the Wichita to the Osage and others for European trade goods. The Wichita had only six guns in their villages, as the Osages and other eastern tribes had resisted trading them guns. Du Tisné traded the Wichita three guns, powder, pickaxes, and knives for two horses and a mule with a Spanish brand. In the course of its life, the mule was traded eastward 600 miles from the Spanish colonies.

When Du Tisné proposed to continue his journey by visiting the Padouca villages to the west, the Wichita objected. He had neither the men or arms to force the issue. But he concluded a trade agreement with the Wichita, concluding they could be satisfied with a few guns and other presents. He was optimistic that the Padouca could later be visited, and that peace between the Wichita and Padouca could be achieved, thus opening up the trade route to New Mexico.

Du Tisné likely had visited a sub-tribe later called Taovayas. As he described them, their total population of perhaps 3,000, seemed a remnant of the numerous Wichita whom Coronado and Onate had met more than a century earlier. As with other Native American tribes, they had likely been decimated by European diseases.

== Later life ==
After this expedition, Du Tisné continued to work on the frontier. He was promoted to captain and given command of Fort de Chartres in Illinois. He died in 1730 of a wound received from a Meskwaki or Fox Indian the previous year.
