= Spanish Fort, Texas =

- Spanish Fort Site
- U.S. National Register of Historic Places
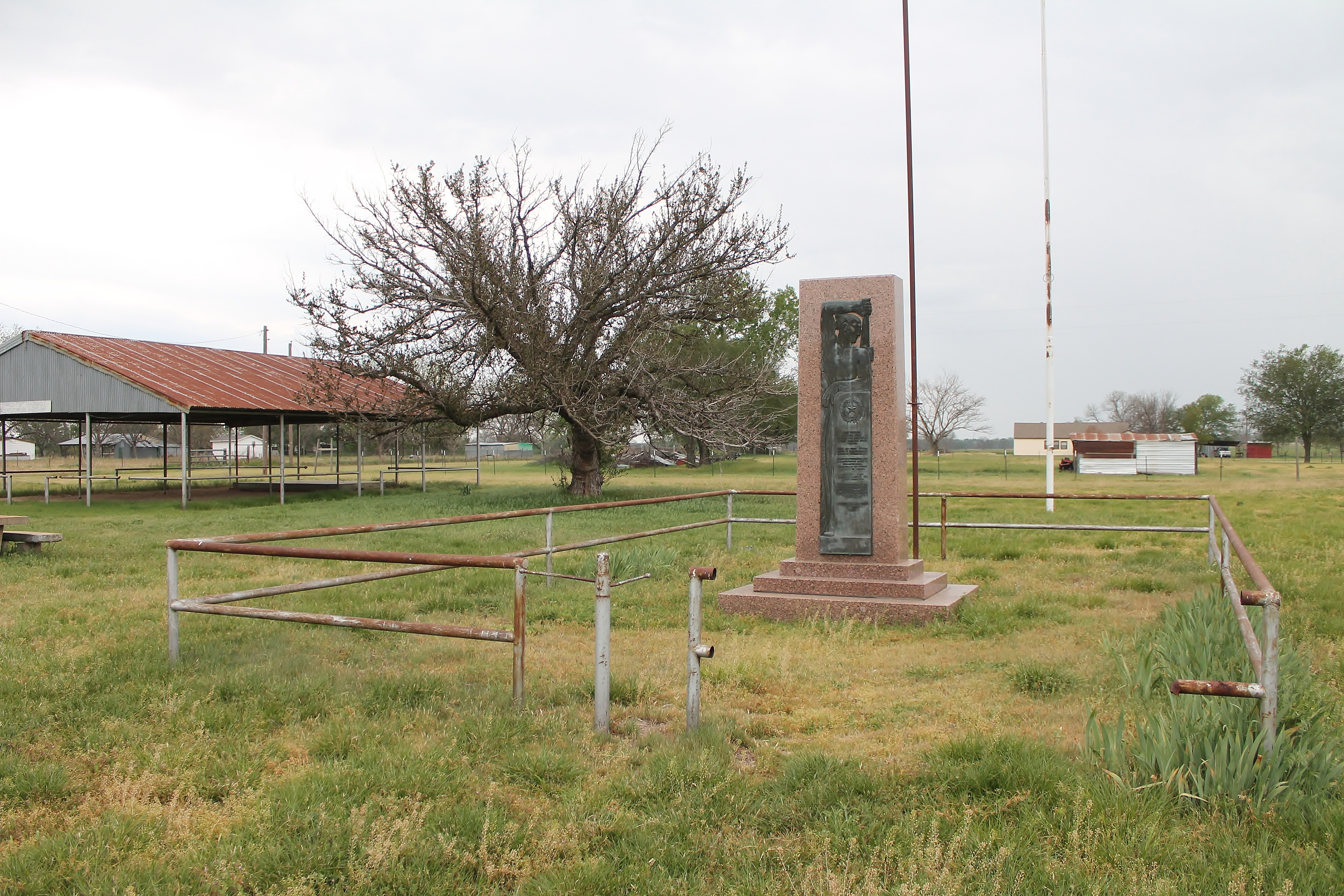
- Historical monument at Spanish Fort townsite

- Location within Texas Location within the United States
- Nearest city: Spanish Fort, Texas
- Coordinates: 33°57′7.2318″N 97°37′36.0948″W
- Area: 10 acres (4.0 ha)
- Built: 1759
- NRHP reference No.: 75002000
- Added to NRHP: April 14, 1975

Spanish Fort is an unincorporated community in north-central Montague County, Texas, United States. According to the Handbook of Texas, the community had a population of 50 in 2000.

== History ==
Spanish Fort was once a Taovaya Indian town that was fortified in the eighteenth century. Later Anglo immigrants who discovered Spanish artifacts and the ruins of a fort nearby gave the settlement the incorrect name. According to Spanish records, the Taovayas built two permanent settlements nearby, on either side of the Red River, between 1750 and 1757. In 1759, Col. Diego Ortiz Parrilla oversaw a campaign of revenge against Taovaya and Comanche Indians after they had looted the Presidio San Luis de las Amarillas. The Taovayan town had an estimated population of 6,000 and was flying the French flag and fortified with entrenchments, wooden stockades, and a moat when several hundred Spanish soldiers arrived. Four hours of fighting ended with the Spanish retreating. They even abandoned their two cannons and baggage train. The Spanish had established peace with the Indians by 1771, but continuing theft, particularly of horses, prompted Athanase de Mézières, the lieutenant governor of the Natchitoches province, to visit in 1778. He convinced the Taovayas to hand over the two cannons and gave the area the name San Teodoro.

Smallpox epidemics that started in 1778 and American expansion following the Louisiana Purchase in 1803 destroyed the population. The Taovayas abandoned their fortification in San Teodoro around 1841, allowing it to deteriorate. The Taovayas had long since left, so an early White settler who visited the ruins in 1859 didn't know anything about their past and imagined it had been a former Spanish fort. Near the site of San Teodoro, a town by the name of Burlington had grown by the early 1870s. For cattle drivers traveling toward the Chisholm Trail, it functioned as a watering spot. After bedding their herds at Red River Station, stockmen on the path rode to the nearby town of Burlington for supplies and entertainment. The community expanded swiftly, and locals petitioned for a post office in 1876. However, according to postal officials, their application was denied because another post office with the same name already existed in Texas. The incorrect name "Spanish Fort" was proposed by two local men in honor of the surrounding ruins. After the new name was approved, the post office in Spanish Fort was established in 1877. When the town was at its busiest, there were several shops and churches, a Masonic lodge, five doctors, four hotels, and a number of saloons, the most well-known of which was J. W. Schrock's Cowboy Saloon, where cattlemen gathered to partake in drinks and tell tales. Herman Joseph Justin started the boot business that eventually developed into Justin Industries in the town plaza. To have their personalized boots completed in time for them to pick them up on their trip south again, Justin took orders from the drivers heading north.

The Burlington Times and the Spanish Fort New Era were at least two newspapers that were published in Spanish Fort by 1884. By 1885, there were 300 residents, but Spanish Fort gained a reputation as a nasty town. Later, Justin's wife claimed that during the height of the cattle industry, there had been over 40 killings; in fact, on one Christmas morning, three men had been murdered before breakfast. Outlaws hiding out in Indian Territory traveled across the Red River to Spanish Fort to get supplies, frequently starting "affrays" that further troubled the town. When the cattle paths shifted further west and the Missouri, Kansas and Texas Railway omitted the town, the excitement at Spanish Fort eventually subsided. Justin relocated his boot business to the nearby town of Nocona in the late 1880s, where it flourished into the 1980s. Throughout the first 40 years of the 20th century, Spanish Fort's population stayed at around 250, and six enterprises remained in operation until 1941. By 1952, there were just 40 people left in the area as residents were drawn to locations with better employment possibilities. Around 1970, the post office and all but one of the businesses closed. Spanish Fort was practically a ghost town by the 1990s. After more than a century of farming by residents of Spanish Fort, the remains of the old Taovaya fortification vanished, but the location of the former San Teodoro was commemorated by a state historical monument built in 1936. The population of Spanish Fort was 50 in 2000, but the majority of the structures in the square remained vacant and abandoned.

On February 10, 2009, an EF4 tornado touched down near Spanish Fort, where it began snapping pecan trees.

The Stonewall Saloon served as a resting stop for cowboys herding livestock on Texas trails.

== Geography ==
Spanish Fort is located at the end of Farm to Market Road 103, one mile south of the Red River, 26 mi (42 km) northeast of Montague, 17 mi (27 km) north of Nocona, and 37 mi (60 km) northeast of Bowie in north-central Montague County.

== Education ==
The first school in Spanish Fort opened in a log cabin in 1884. Today, Spanish Fort is serviced by the Prairie Valley Independent School District.

== Archeological Site of Spanish Fort ==
In 1965, Spanish Fort was excavated along the Red River of the South encompassing the geographies of Jefferson County, Oklahoma, and Montague County, Texas. The excavation and surveying was for archeological and artifacts analysis purposes.

== Historical record ==
Spanish Fort received historic markers in 1936 and 1976 recognizing the Taovaya tribe culture and the 1759 confrontation with a Spanish expedition.

The Spanish Fort site was added to the National Register of Historic Places in 1975.

== Notable people ==
- Francisco Xavier Chaves, who was held captive by the Taovaya and, along with Pedro Vial, traveled to the fort to meet the Wichita people.
- Pedro Vial, French explorer and frontiersman.

== See also ==
- National Register of Historic Places listings in Montague County, Texas
