= Stonewall Saloon (Texas) =

- The Museum of the Stonewall Saloon
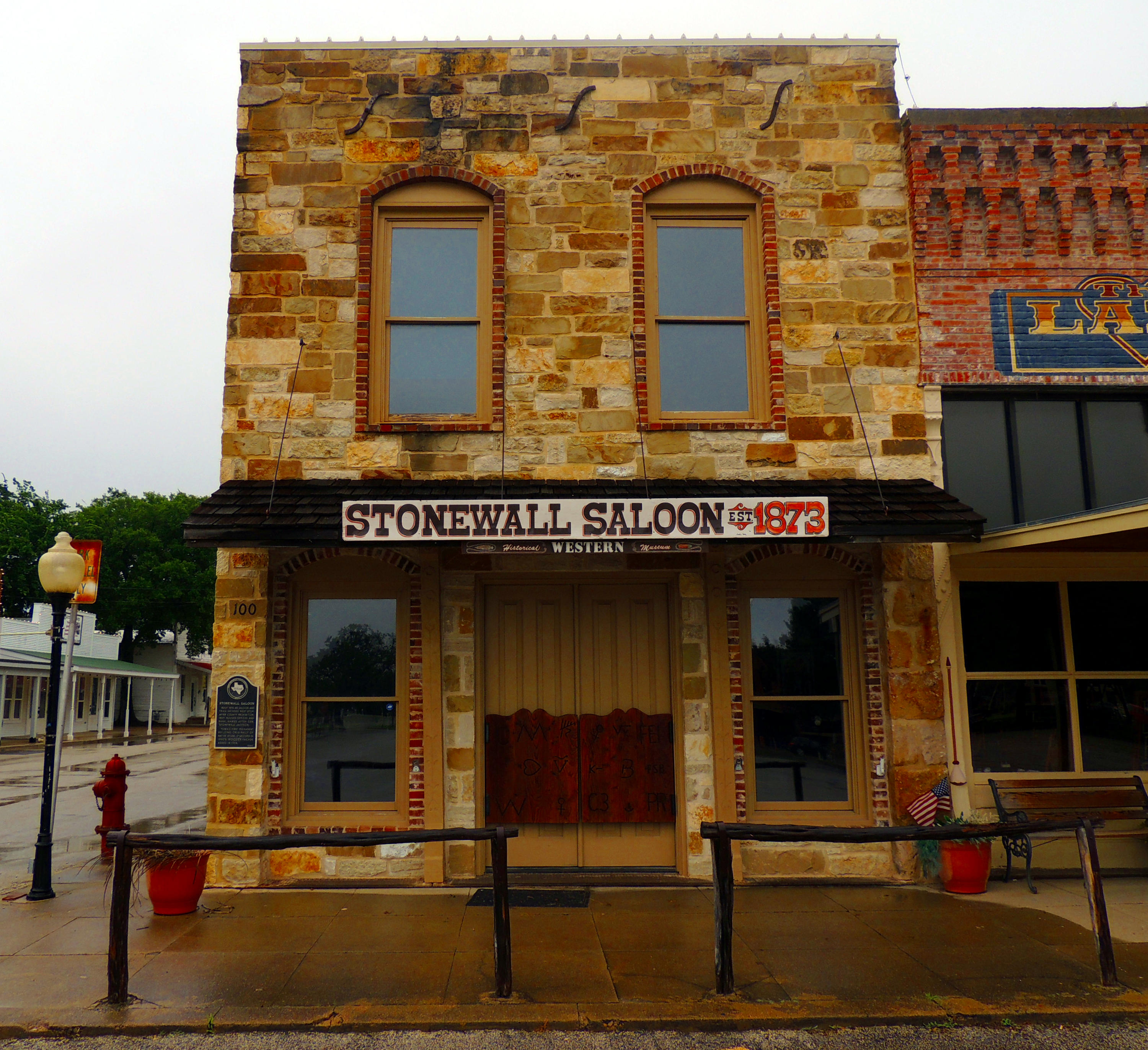
- 1873 Old West Saloon in Saint Jo, Texas

- Location within Texas Location within the United States
- Former name: Citizens National Bank (1905); Kingery Brothers Oil Company (1942)
- Established: 1873
- Location: Saint Jo, Montague County, Texas
- Coordinates: 33.695732°N 97.522171°W
- Type: Museum
- Founder: Irb H. Boggess
- Architect: Irb H. Boggess
- Website: Stonewall Saloon Museum

Stonewall Saloon or The Museum of the Stonewall Saloon is an authentic western saloon located in Saint Jo, Texas. The tavern was named as acknowledgment of Stonewall Jackson as American Civil War exiles appealed for sanctuary in what was termed "Indian country." The saloon was established in 1873 during the eminence of the cattle drive era exemplary of the late nineteenth century Old West.

The saloon served as a rest stop for ranch hands herding livestock on Texas cattle drive trails equivalent to the Chisholm Trail, Shawnee Trail, and Western Trail. The cow poke cantina was a final resting stop before progressing to the northern townships of Red River Station, Texas and Spanish Fort, Texas while preceding the Red River cattle crossing into Indian Territory and the cattle towns of America's northern heartland.

After the saloon closed due to Prohibition, the building housed a restaurant in 1902 and in 1905 became Citizens National Bank. It was later sold and reopened as a non-profit museum.

== History ==
=== Saloon ===
When Joseph Howell and Irb. H. Boggess laid out the town of Saint Jo, Texas, originally called Head of Elm, the saloon was built as a focal point. The building was the first permanent structure on the Saint Jo town square, and was "built to accommodate cowboys as they moved herds of Longhorns up the Chisholm Trail." Built in 1873, it was the first building in the town constructed by Boggess, and was first named Boggess and Fulton, and dubbed The Stonewall Saloon later on. "Peg Leg" Fulton was the operator. A boarding house was above the saloon itself. It was one of the "rest stops along the Chisholm Trail and the last before a herd was taken across the Red River at Red River Station northwest of the small Montague County town."

=== Prohibition and First National Bank ===
In 1897, the saloon closed its open drinking area due to a "self-imposed county prohibition." Due to Prohibition on a national level, the saloon officially closed on February 11, 1899. The building housed a restaurant in 1902. James R. Wiley bought the building in 1905, and established Citizens National Bank, adding a new facade and a vault from Hall's Safe Company.

The bank was purchased in 1942 by H.D. Field Sr., and dissolved. The building was rented for offices. In the 1950s, H.D. Field Jr. purchased the building and restored it to be a replica of the original saloon. It opened in 1958 as the Stonewall Saloon Museum, becoming a local tourist attraction. From 1958 and for 15 to 20 years, the museum collected objects from the surrounding area, remaining open as a museum until the curator at the time died. At the point the building began to deteriorate, with an external wall falling into the street that the owner couldn't afford to have repaired.

=== Renovations and museum ===
In 2008, Dick Cain, a member of the museum's board of directors, was part of a group of locals who purchased the museum. In 2011, it became a 501(c)(3) nonprofit. During a restoration of the walls and floors, color on the wall was discovered, with a history specialist determining it had likely been decorated that way in the 1870s, with Cain stating "A troupe of German artists came through and that's what they used for decoration."

The museum received a $5000 grant in October 2015 from the Texas Historical Foundation, to be used for the purpose of renovation. The second floor of the building was renovated in 2016.

== Building ==
The museum has hitching rails on the outside of the saloon doors. Inside, photographs and artifacts from frontier life fill the museum, including farming and ranching equipment.

== Texas Historical Commission Site ==
Stonewall Saloon received a historical marker in 1967 by the Texas Historical Commission recognizing the 1873 establishment of the late nineteenth century Gilded Age and Reconstruction era.

== Gallery ==
Stonewall Saloon in Saint Jo, Texas
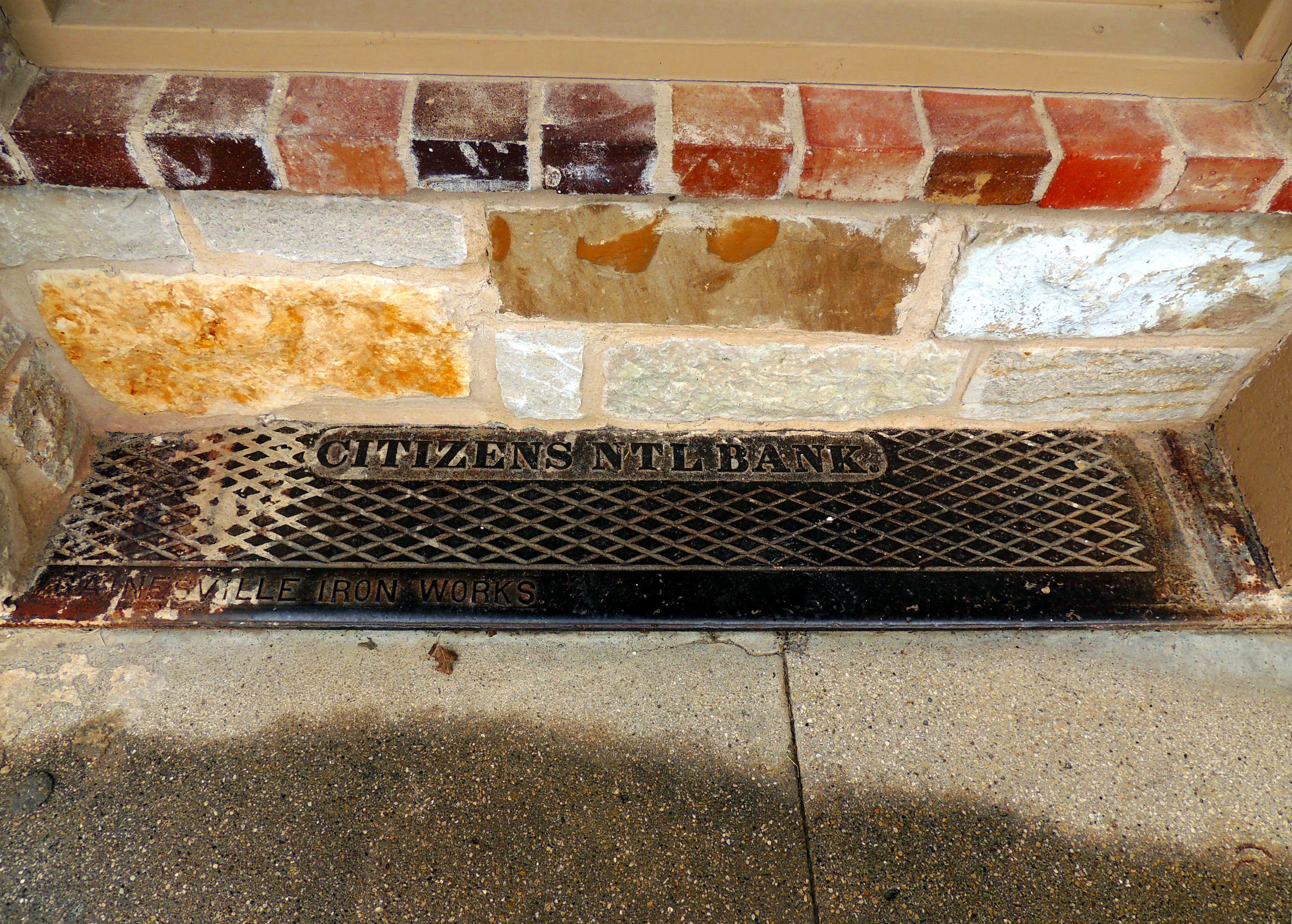
Citizens National Bank cast iron threshold sill at Stonewall Saloon

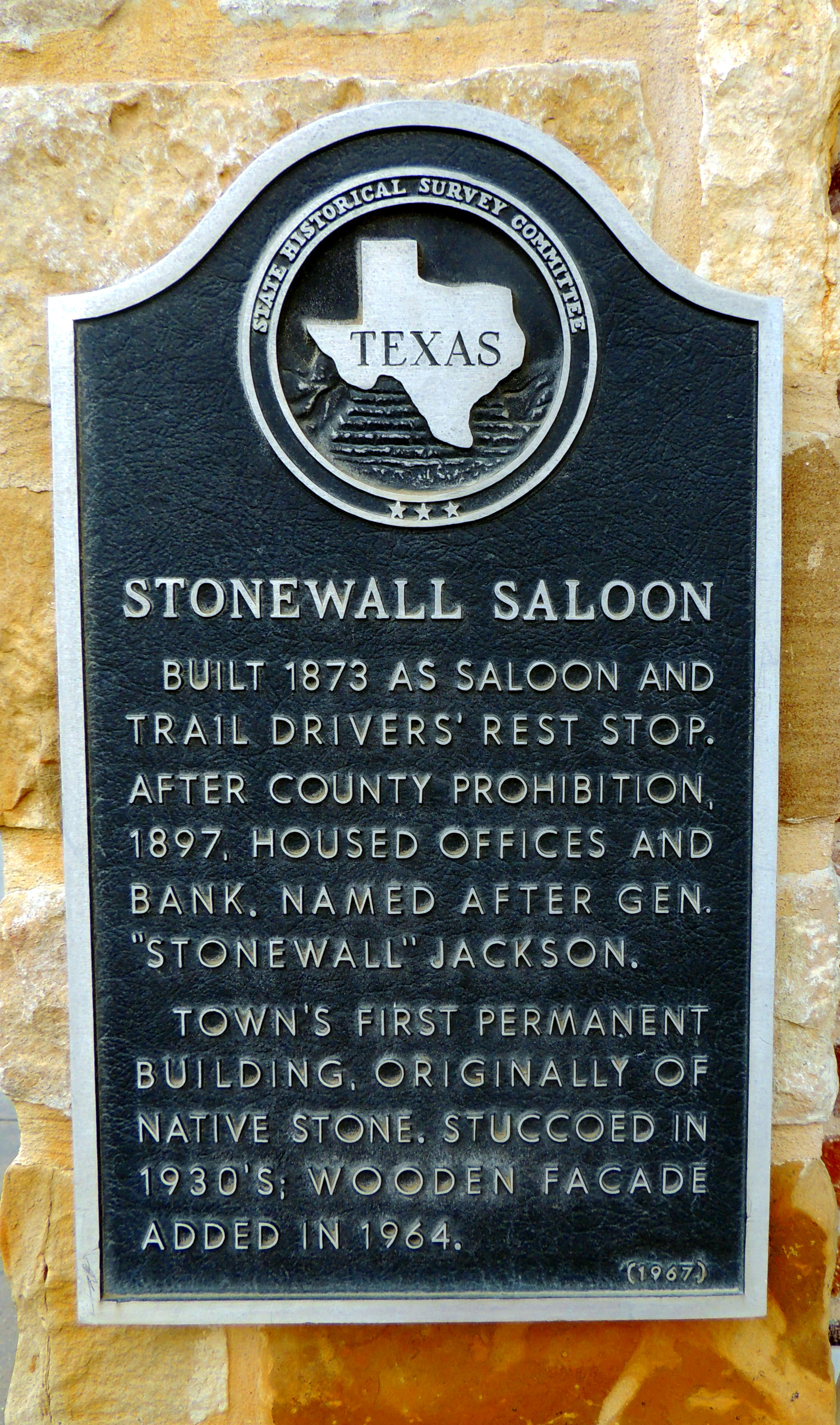
Texas Historical Commission marker at Stonewall Saloon

== See also ==
- Bird's Fort
- Great Plains
- Comanche campaign
- History of vice in Texas
- Confederados
- Indian Attacks on Cowboys
- Confederate colonies
- New Texas
- Fort Richardson
- Red River War
