= Francisco Xavier Chaves =

Francisco Xavier Chaves (born c.1762, New Mexico—died 1832, San Antonio, Texas) was taken captive by the Comanche in 1770 and was subsequently sold or traded to the Taovaya. He was fluent in the Taovaya and Comanche languages as well as Spanish. In 1785, along with Pedro Vial, he negotiated a durable peace agreement between the Comanche and the Spanish colony of Texas. Although illiterate, Chaves became a lieutenant in the Spanish and Mexican armies and continued to serve as an interpreter and intermediary between the Spanish and Mexicans and the Indian tribes of the Texas frontier.

== Early life and captivity ==
Chaves was born about 1762 in the Atrisco valley near Albuquerque, New Mexico, the son of Ignacio Chaves and Gregoria Maese. He was taken captive about 1770 by the Comanche while he was herding sheep near his home. A Comanche woman adopted him, but she died and he was sold to the Taovaya, a Wichita tribe living along the Red River in Oklahoma and Texas. In 1784 he was in a raiding party of Taovaya near San Antonio. On July 18, he deserted the raiders and the same day offered his services to Domingo Cabello y Robles, the Spanish governor of Texas.

Chaves, 22 years old, was described as little more than 5 ft (1.5 m) tall, dressed as an Indian, and with his eyes tattooed in the Taovaya style. He spoke both the Comanche and the Taovaya languages. Cabello was under pressure from Spanish authorities to negotiate a long-sought peace with the Comanche and he realized that Chaves was a rare asset. Unknown to the Spanish, the eastern Comanche were weaker and perhaps more disposed toward peace because a smallpox epidemic four years earlier had killed as many as two thirds of them in some bands. A concurrent drought reduced the quality of the grazing land for the bison and horse herds they depended upon and also reduced the production of agricultural products by the Taovaya and other farming Indians for which the Comanche customarily traded as an essential part of their diet.

== Negotiations with the Comanche ==
An opportunity to seek peace with the Comanche came about on February 14, 1785, when a delegation of Wichita and Taovaya, allies of the Comanche, came to San Antonio and indicated a willingness to establish a peaceful relationship with the Spanish. Chaves served as an interpreter for the meeting. Pedro Vial, a 38-year old French trader and gunsmith who had lived among the Taovaya and spoke their language, accompanied the Taovaya and after the meeting remained in San Antonio. Vial volunteered to assist Cabello in seeking a peace treaty with the Comanche. Vial, lacking experience with the Comanche, chose Chaves to accompany him on the endeavor. The two men and two helpers departed San Antonio on June 17, 1785, taking with them gifts and trade items with a value of 430 pesos (roughly $30,000 in 2020 dollars).

Vial and Cháves first journeyed to Nacogdoches, Texas. Accompanied by two Taovaya leaders, they left Nacogdoches on July 23, 1785, and traveled to the twin Taovaya villages on the Red River. The party arrived at the Taovaya villages (near present-day Spanish Fort, Texas) on August 6. Vial and Chaves's expedition to make peace with the Comanches found favor with the Taovaya and the Wichita and they journeyed to meet the various bands of the Eastern Comanche (Cuchanees or Kotsoteka) on the Little Wichita River near present-day Wichita Falls, Texas. Vial and Chaves persuaded several of the Comanche chiefs to accompany them to San Antonio for peace talks with the Governor. They arrived there on September 19 and concluded a peace agreement which lasted, with occasional lapses, for 35 years.

== Soldier ==
Chaves continued to serve as an interpreter until 1788 when he joined the Spanish army and served, mostly in San Antonio, until his retirement in 1829. He was initially illiterate, but apparently attained enough literacy to become a second lieutenant in 1828. In 1792, Pedro Vial encountered Chaves by accident in New Mexico west of the Pecos River. Chaves, accompanied by seven Comanche families, was journeying to visit his parents near Albuquerque. He had not seen them since 1770 when he had been captured by the Comanches. In 1822, he accompanied a Tonkawa delegation to Saltillo to meet with officials of newly independent Mexico. Chaves died in San Antonio in 1832. In the words of James F. Brooks, Chaves "inhabited, or coexisted in, multiple social worlds, fluidly crossing back and forth between them."

== Family ==
Chaves was married twice, first to Juana Padrón, with whom he had at least six children. After her death in 1817, he married Micaela Fragoso and the couple had five children.
