= Pedro Vial =

French explorer and frontiersman

- Born: Pierre Vial; 1746; Lyon, France
- Died: October 1814 (aged 67–68); Santa Fe, New Mexico
- Occupation: Explorer

Pedro Vial, or Pierre Vial (c. 1746 in Lyon, France – October 1814 in Santa Fe, New Mexico), was a French explorer and frontiersman who lived among the Comanche and Wichita Indians for many years. He later worked for the Spanish government as a peacemaker, guide, and interpreter. He blazed trails across the Great Plains to connect the Spanish and French settlements in Texas, New Mexico, Missouri, and Louisiana. He led three Spanish expeditions that attempted unsuccessfully to intercept and halt the Lewis and Clark Expedition.

== Blacksmith with the Indians ==
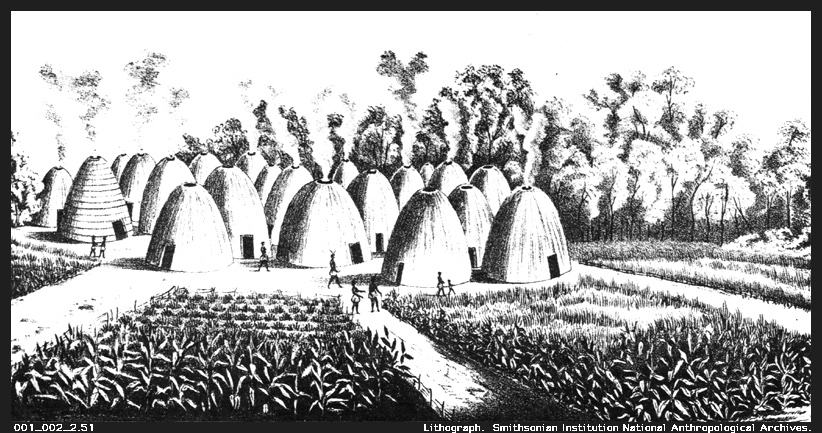
The Wichita, including the Taovaya, lived in grass-thatched beehive shaped houses. They were excellent farmers.

Vial comes to the notice of history in 1779 when he visited Natchitoches and New Orleans, Louisiana. He was described by Spanish authorities as a "gunsmith...who usually lives among the savage nations." At that time, he had already lived for several years with the Taovaya, a Wichita tribe in their twin villages on the Red River at Spanish Fort, Texas and in Jefferson County, Oklahoma. Vial spoke French, Wichita and halting Spanish. He communicated with the Comanche in Wichita which many of them spoke. The Spanish were suspicious about the activities of Vial, a Frenchman, and tried unsuccessfully to prevent him from living among the Indians.

== Diplomacy with the Comanche ==
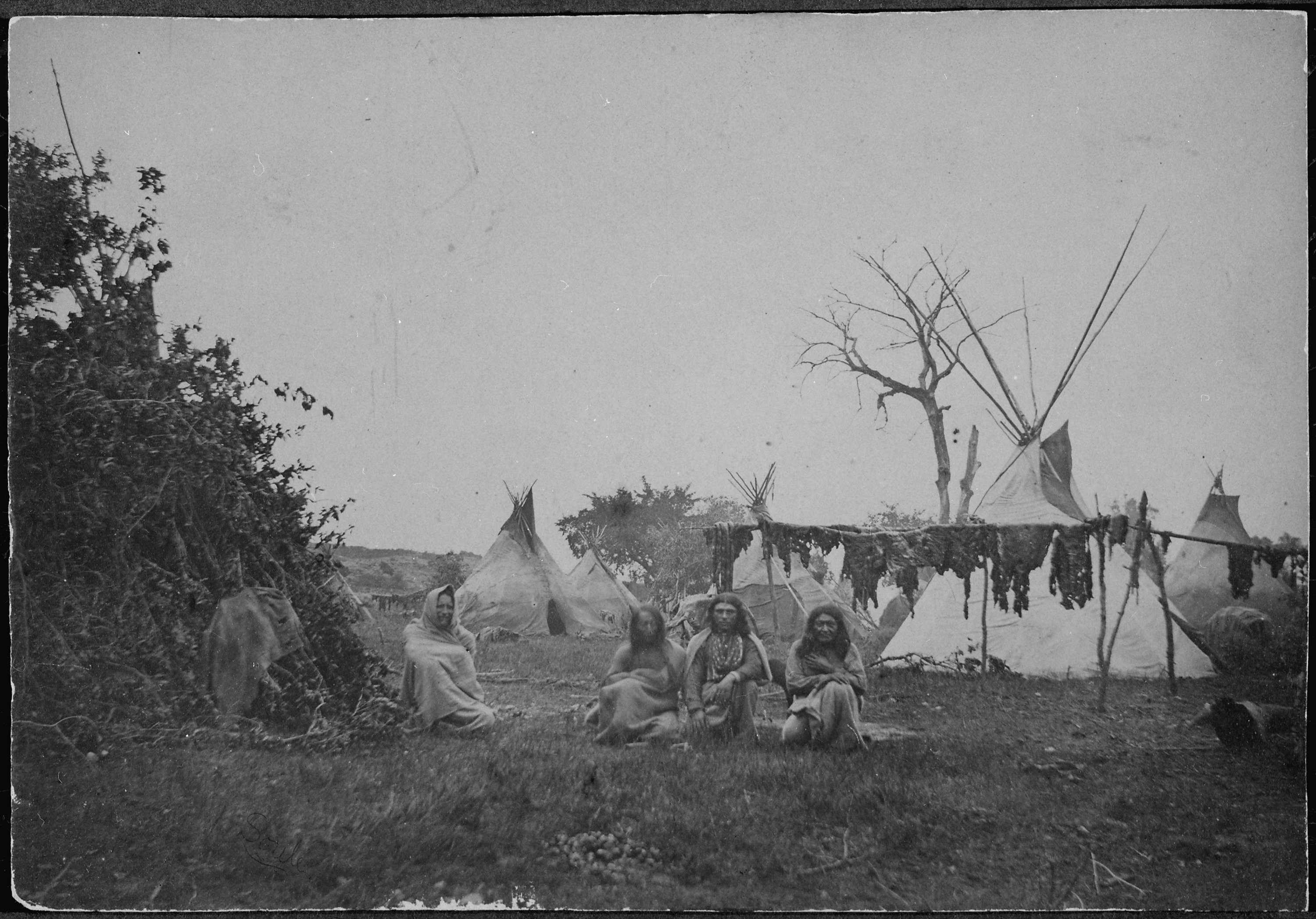
The Comanche were often at war with the Spanish colonies in Texas and New Mexico. They were nomads who traded buffalo meat to farming tribes such as the Wichita and Pueblo for agricultural products.

In Autumn 1784, Vial came to San Antonio, the capital of Spanish Texas, with a delegation of two Frenchmen and four Wichita leaders to improve the strained relations between the Wichita and the Spanish. That being accomplished, the Spanish governor persuaded Vial to undertake a peace mission to the Comanche, who often raided Spanish settlements in Texas. Vial selected a 22-year-old Spaniard, Francisco Xavier Chaves (b. 1762—d. 1832) to accompany him. Cháves, born in New Mexico, had been captured by Comanche when he was eight years old and grew up among the Wichita and Comanche, speaking both languages. In 1784, Cháves had escaped from the Wichita and presented himself to Spanish authorities.

Vial and Cháves and two servants began their mission at Nacogdoches, Texas on July 23, 1785. They journeyed to the twin Taovaya villages on the Red River in company with two Taovaya leaders. The party arrived at the Taovaya villages (near present day Spanish Fort, Texas) on August 6. Vial's expedition to make peace with the Comanches found favor with the Taovaya and their close relatives, the Wichita, and they journeyed to meet the various bands of the Eastern Comanche (Cuchanees or Kotsoteka) on the Little Wichita River near present-day Wichita Falls, Texas. Vial persuaded several of the Comanche chiefs to accompany him to San Antonio for peace talks with the Governor. They arrived there on September 19 and concluded a peace agreement which lasted, with occasional lapses, for 35 years.

== Blazing trails ==
Building on the peace agreement with the Comanche, Vial volunteered to find a route from San Antonio to the Spanish settlements in New Mexico, there being no direct contact between the Spanish in Texas and New Mexico at this time. The governor ordered him also to castigate the Taovaya for a raid on the Spanish horse herd at San Antonio. Vial and a companion, Cristóbal de los Santos. set out from San Antonio on October 4, 1786 reached the twin villages of the Taovaya on December 28. After warning the Taovaya that their friendship with the Spanish was in danger, he continued on westward, following the Red River upstream, wintering among the Comanche near Wichita Falls, Texas and continuing on in spring through the Texas Panhandle, reaching Santa Fe, New Mexico on May 26, 1787, thus becoming the first European to cross the Great Plains from San Antonio to Santa Fe.

The Spanish in Santa Fe immediately sent a return expedition to San Antonio, but Vial remained in Santa Fe until June 24, 1788 when he undertook with several companions another crossing of the Great Plains, this time to Natchitoches, arriving on August 20. Once again, Vial benefited from Comanche guides. From Natchitoches, he traveled to San Antonio again, and then returned to Santa Fe, arriving on August 20, 1789 after a journey of more than 2,400 miles (4,000 km).

In 1792, Vial was ordered to cross the Great Plains again, this time to open communications between New Mexico and St. Louis, Missouri. He left Santa Fe, May 21, 1792, accompanied by two young men. East of the Pecos River, Vial encountered his former colleague, Francisco Xavier Chavés, who was en route to Santa Fe to visit his parents whom he had not seen since being captured by the Comanche 22 years earlier. Bygones being bygones, Chavés was now traveling with a group of Comanche.

Vial roughly followed the route of the later Santa Fe Trail in crossing the plains. Near the Arkansas River in Kansas, Vial encountered a party of Kaw Indians who took him and his companions captive, threatened to kill them, and took them to their village on the Kansas River. There, Vial was rescued by a French trader and continued his journey by boat down the Missouri River to St. Louis, arriving there on October 3, 1792. He remained in St. Louis until June 14, 1793 because of Osage raids which interrupted communications on the Missouri River. Vial returned to Santa Fe by roughly the same route, visiting the Pawnee en route and arriving in Santa Fe on November 15, 1793.

== Chasing Lewis and Clark ==
In 1795, Vial, suspected of being disloyal to Spain, was arrested in Santa Fe, but was soon freed and dispatched again to the Pawnee to make peace between them and the Comanche. He did so but on his return to Santa Fe he was re-arrested. He escaped and with Comanche help made his way across the Great Plains and took up residence for the next few years in the St. Louis area. He returned to Santa Fe again in 1803 and was pardoned and given back pay for his services.

When the Spanish heard that the Lewis and Clark Expedition was traversing territory claimed by Spain, they attempted to halt the expedition. Vial and another French frontiersman, Jose Jarvet (Chalvert) led a force of 52 soldiers, Spanish settlers, and Pueblo Indians to find and arrest the Americans. Leaving Santa Fe on August 1, 1804, Vial reached a Pawnee village in central Nebraska where they heard that Lewis and Clark had already passed that way, and were about 100 miles (160 km) distant and proceeding up the Missouri River. Vial made no effort to catch the Americans, but returned to Santa Fe on November 5.

The next year, departing Santa Fe on October 5, 1805, where a new gobernor had been appointed by the king, Joaquin del Real Alencaster, Vial and Jarvet with 100 men were sent out again to seek an alliance with the Plains Indians tribes to prevent the return of Lewis and Clark, who were by this time on the Columbia River, far to the northwest. Near present-day Las Animas, Colorado, Vial was attacked by about 100 well-armed and mounted Indians whose persistence caused him to return to New Mexico. Despite his expertise and experience, he was unable to identify the tribe or language of the Indians attacking him.

On April 19, 1806, Vial and Jarvet departed again from Santa Fe northward with yet another force, this time with 300 men as governor del Real Alencaster was more aggressive in his strategy, to secure treaties with the plains tribes and thwart the efforts of the Americans. The expedition was soon abandoned due to desertions and Vial was back in Santa Fe by May 30.

The Spanish made one last effort to intercept Lewis and Clark. In June 1806, Lt. Facundo Melgares close collaborator of fellow spaniard del Real Alencaster, departed New Mexico with 600 men—105 soldiers, 400 militia, and 100 allied Indians—with the objective of making a peace treaty with the Pawnee and halting American incursions into what the Spanish considered their territory. Melgares left one-half his men on the Arkansas River and proceeded with the other 300 to the Pawnee villages in Nebraska. Although his talks with the Pawnee appeared successful, they also raided his horse herd. If Melgares had continued his journey another 100 miles (160 km) east to the Missouri River he might have intercepted Lewis and Clark on their return journey. The Melgares expedition was the largest military force ever dispatched by the Spanish to the Great Plains. Melgares returned to New Mexico in November 1806.

== Later life ==
Vial, now being called "Old Vial," apparently accepted the U.S. rule of the Louisiana Purchase. On September 14, 1808, he was given a license by Meriwether Lewis to trap on the Missouri River. He also continued to serve the Spanish in New Mexico as an interpreter and guide. On October 2, 1814, Vial signed his will in Santa Fe, stating that he had neither wife nor children, and leaving his meager belongings to Maria Manuela Martin. He presumably died shortly thereafter.

Pedro Vial was the first European to make "the first overland trip from San Antonio to Santa Fe; the man who made the first overland trip from Santa Fe to Natchitoches, the man who made the first transit of the Santa Fe Trail between Santa Fe and St. Louis." It was, however, the United States rather than the Spanish who benefited most from his explorations. The historian, Abraham P. Nasatir called him the "greatest frontiersman of them all."

It is possible that Vial's travels were even more extensive than those recorded. In 1787, he gave a map of "territories transited by Pedro Vial" to Spanish authorities. It depicts with fair accuracy the area from the Mississippi River westward to the Rocky Mountains, including the Missouri River. It is the first known map to depict the Three Forks of the upper Missouri River in Montana, the discovery of which are usually attributed to Lewis and Clark in 1805. He has the Three Forks located at approximately their correct location 700 miles north of Santa Fe.
