= Athanase de Mezieres =

French-Spanish nobleman, explorer and colonial administrator

Athanase de Mézières
- Born: Athanase de Mézières y Clugny; March 26, 1719
- Died: November 2, 1779 (aged 60); San Antonio, Texas, New Spain
- Citizenship: French (later served Spain)
- Occupations: Soldier, Diplomat, Explorer, Colonial administrator
- Known for: Diplomacy with Plains tribes; exploration of the Red River and Northern Texas
- Title: Governor of Texas-designate (1779); Lieutenant Governor of Natchitoches (1769–1779)
- Spouses: Marie Petronille Feliciane de St. Denis (1746–1747); Pelagie Fazende
- Children: 9
- Parents: Louis Christophe de Mézières; Marie Antoinette Clugny

Athanase de Mézières (born Athanase de Mézières y Clugny, March 26, 1719 – November 2, 1779) was an 18th century French nobleman, explorer, and former Lieutenant Governor of Natchitoches in Louisiana, United States. Initially a French infantryman in Louisiana, he became a diplomat for the Government of Spain when the region passed into their control in 1763. He was responsible for drawing up treaties with Native American communities and travelled extensively along the Red River. Mézières was appointed Governor of Texas in 1779, but died before he could assume the position.

== Early life and French military career ==
Mézières was born Athanase de Mézières y Clugny on March 26, 1719 to French nobleman Louis Christophe de Mézières and Marie Antoinette Clugny. He began his career in the French infantry and was assigned to the Colony of Louisiana in the 1730s. He served for the next three decades, eventually reaching the rank of Captain. On September 15, 1763, Mézières was discharged from the French infantry, when Louisiana passed into Spanish control.

In 1746, while assigned to the French outpost at Natchitoches, he married Marie Petronille Feliciane de St. Denis, daughter of the French explorer and commandant of Natchitoches, Louis Juchereau de St. Denis. This marriage ended when Marie died in childbirth in 1747, and Mézières later married Pelagie Fazende.

== Career during Spanish control of Louisiana ==
After the transfer of Louisiana to Spain, Mézières offered his services to the new colonial government. In 1769, he was appointed Lieutenant Governor of Natchitoches by the Administrator of Louisiana, Alejandro O'Reilly. Mézières had learnt Latin, French, Spanish, and several Native American languages, and was dispatched to Northern Texas as an agent of the Spanish.

In 1770, he began expeditions to the Red River as part of his diplomatic duties. In 1771, he negotiated treaties with the Native American communities of the Kichais, Tawakonis, Taovayas, and the Tonkawas.

During his numerous expeditions between Louisiana and Texas, Mézières crossed the West Fork of the Trinity River near present-day Fort Worth. In his diary and report to the colonial authorities, he wrote:

It is worthy to note that from the Brazos River on which the Tuacanas are established, and until one reaches the river which bathes the village of the Taovayzes (Red River), one sees on the right a forest that the natives appropriately call the Grand Forest. ...it is very dense, but not very wide. It seems to be there as a guide to even the most inexperienced, and to give refuge in this dangerous region to those who, few in number and lacking in courage, wish to go from one village to another. — De Mezieres

== Later life and death ==
In 1778, the Governor of Louisiana, Bernardo de Galvez, appointed Mézières as a diplomat for additional services in Texas. He was tasked with forging an alliance between the Spanish, Comanches, and Norteños against the Apaches. Mézières travelled extensively in New Orleans, along the Red River, and to the newly-established town of Bucareli.

While travelling between Los Adaes and Nacogdoches, Mézières sustained a severe head injury when thrown from his horse. He never fully recovered, but continued his journey and arrived in San Antonio in September 1779. He was appointed the Governor of Texas, but was unable to assume office. He died a few days later, on November 2, 1779.

Mézières was survived by one child from his first wife, and eight from his second. The proposed alliance with the Comanches and Norteños, that he was working on before his death, was never fully realized.
