= Little Wichita River =

Location
- Country: United States
- State: Texas

Physical characteristics
- Mouth
  - location: 33.8987°N 97.9849°W

The Little Wichita River is a river in Texas and a tributary of the Red River.

== See also ==
- List of rivers of Texas
- Geology of Wichita Falls, Texas
- Little Red River (Texas)
