= El Cerrito, New Mexico =

- Village
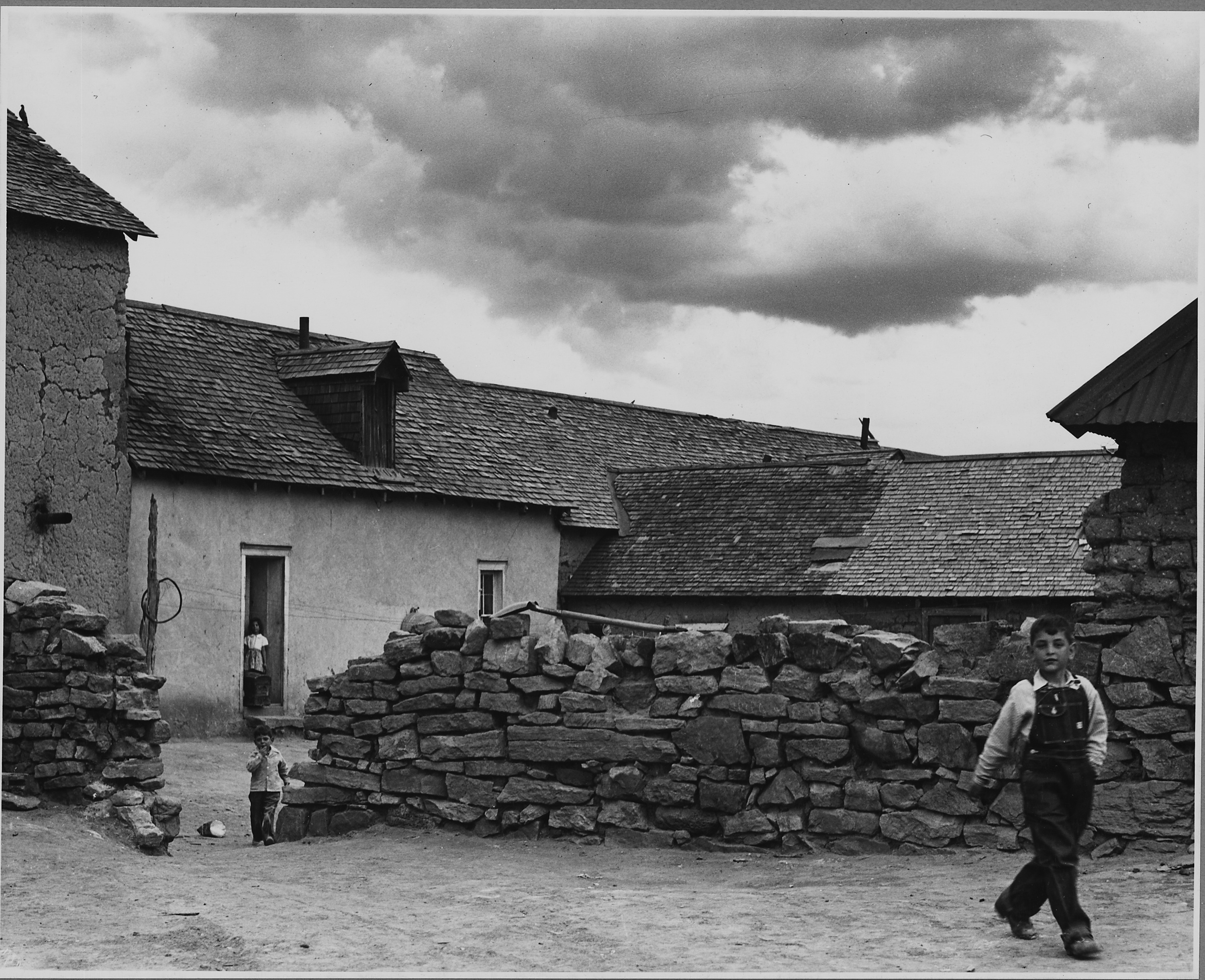
- El Cerrito, San Miguel County, New Mexico. (1941)

- Location in the United States
- Coordinates: 35°16′32″N 105°18′43″W
- Country: United States
- State: New Mexico
- County: San Miguel
- Elevation: 5,712 ft (1,741 m)

Population (1990s)
  - Total: 25−30
- Time zone: UTC-7 (Mountain (MST))
  - Summer (DST): UTC-6 (MDT)
- GNIS feature ID: 915921

El Cerrito is a village in San Miguel County, New Mexico, United States. The village is located in the upper Pecos River valley and was founded in 1824 by settlers from Villanueva, 5 kilometres (3.1 miles) upstream. The majority of the population is Hispanic.

Since 1939, El Cerrito has been the subject of several academic studies and books. Its prominence is due to the isolation of the village from major transportation routes and population centers and its Hispanic culture.

== History ==
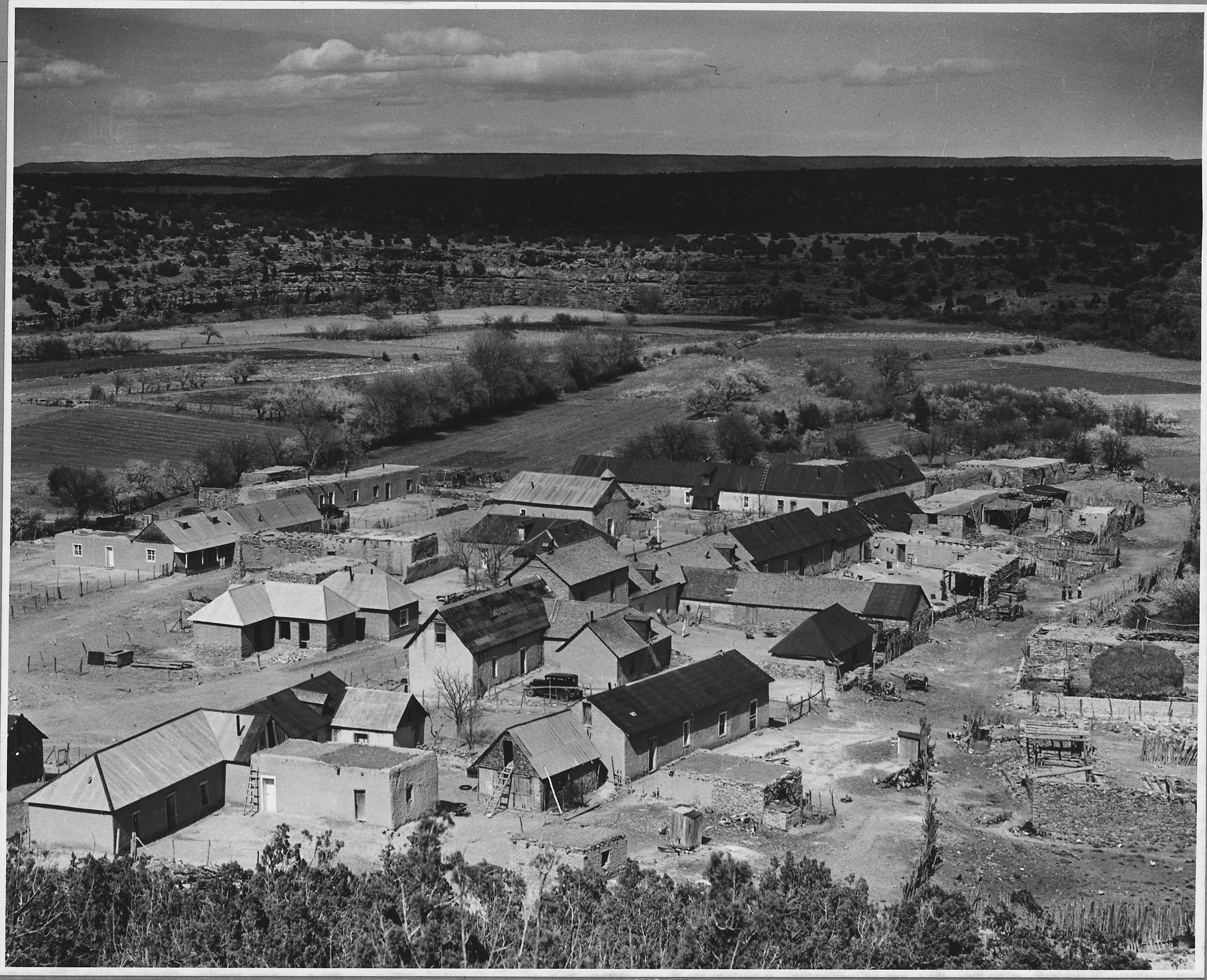
El Cerrito, 1941.

Prior to 1786, when a peace treaty was concluded with the Comanches, Spanish settlements in New Mexico were confined to the Rio Grande Valley and nearby. The reduced threat from the Comanches, the most numerous and dangerous of the Indian peoples surrounding the New Mexican settlements, permitted the expansion of the Spanish eastward toward the Great Plains. El Cerrito was one of the settlements founded in the Pecos River Valley in the San Miguel del Vado Land Grant, a 315,000 acres (127,000 ha) area the New Mexican government gave to individuals and families in exchange for their commitment to take up residence on the frontier of the Spanish settlements. The motivations for the Pecos Valley settlements were to provide land to the growing population of New Mexico and to defend the Spanish and Puebloan settlements in the Rio Grande valley from raids by Apache and other Indian peoples.

El Cerrito was settled by people from nearby Villanueva (then called La Cuesta) from 1824 to 1827. As one of the closest New Mexican settlements to the Great Plains with its bison herds and Plains Indians, many Ciboleros (bison hunters) and Comancheros (traders with the Plains Indians) originated from El Cerrito and other Hispano communities along the Pecos River.

A U.S. government survey in 1941 described El Cerrito:

El Cerrito is on the Pecos River in one of the many land pockets formed at irregular intervals where the valley widens out to allow space for a few houses and a little bottom land. The valley land has never been sufficient in extent to allow full-time farming, but has constituted an indispensable basis of operations for the more extensive enterprises of dry-land farming and stock raising. Usually the individual family owned a tract large enough to grow a garden and enough feed crops to feed a horse or two, a cow, and perhaps a pig. The principal source of income was livestock which with few restrictions roamed the surrounding mesa.

El Cerrito suffered an economic blow in 1904 when the United States Court of Private Land Claims invalidated the common ownership of nearly all the land of the San Miguel del Vado Land Grant, leaving the residents of El Cerrito owning only 118 acres (48 ha) of irrigated land and house lots. Over time, as private ownership by outsiders of formerly-common lands expanded, residents lost the access to the grazing lands that were the basis of the village economy. From a population of 135 in 1940, the population declined to five aged adults in the late 1960s. The population increased to nine households in 1992 with 25 to 30 persons in full-time residence.
