= Villanueva, New Mexico =

Unincorporated community in New Mexico, United States

- Unincorporated community
- Location within the state of New Mexico
- Coordinates: 35°15′25″N 105°22′20″W
- Country: United States
- State: New Mexico
- County: San Miguel

Area
  - Total: 7.25 sq mi (18.79 km^{2})
  - Land: 7.25 sq mi (18.79 km^{2})
  - Water: 0 sq mi (0.00 km^{2})
- Elevation: 5,853 ft (1,784 m)

Population (2020)
  - Total: 207
  - Density: 28.5/sq mi (11.01/km^{2})
- Time zone: UTC-7 (MST)
  - Summer (DST): UTC-6 (MDT)
- ZIP code: 87583
- Area code: 505
- FIPS code: 35-83130
- GNIS ID: 2584233

Villanueva is an unincorporated community and census-designated place in San Miguel County, New Mexico, United States. Known as La Cuesta until 1890, it is located along the Pecos River and New Mexico State Road 3. Villanueva has the ZIP code 87583. As of the 2020 census, Villanueva had a population of 207.

== History ==
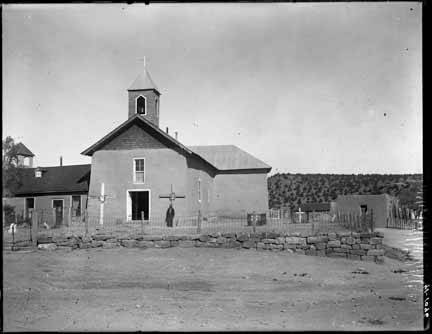
Church at Villanueva, ca. 1915.

Prior to 1786, when a peace treaty was concluded with the Comanche, Spanish settlements in New Mexico were confined to the Rio Grande valley. The reduced threat from Comanche raids permitted the expansion eastwards of Spanish settlements onto the Great Plains. Villanueva was one of the settlements founded in the Pecos River Valley as part of that expansion. A principal reason for founding the Pecos Valley settlements was to defend the Spanish and Pueblan settlements in the Rio Grande valley from raids by Apache and other Indian peoples.

Villanueva, a Spanish colonial village, was founded in 1808 and originally called La Cuesta (Spanish, hill or slope) because the village sits on top of a steeply sloping hill or cuesta overlooking the Pecos River. La Cuesta was one of the communities located within the San Miguel del Vado Land Grant. The grant was approved by the Spanish government in 1794 and settlements established in the land grant area included Bernal, El Pueblo, Entrnosa, Guzano, La Cuesta, Las Mulas, Puertecito, San Jose del Vado, and San Miguel del Vado.

Families from La Cuesta established the community of Anton Chico, on the Pecos River 18 kilometres (11 miles) downstream from La Cuesta, in 1822 and El Cerrito, 5 kilometres (3.1 miles) downstream from La Cuesta, from 1824 to 1827. A church, still existing, was built in La Cuesta in 1831. By 1835 and thereafter, La Cuesta was one of the most populous settlements in the Pecos Valley. In 1845 La Cuesta probably had a population approaching 500 people.

Many Ciboleros (buffalo hunters) and Comancheros (traders with the Plains Indians), of the 19th century originated from La Cuesta and other Hispano communities along the Pecos River.

In 1890, the community was renamed to Villanueva, for a prominent local family.

== Geography ==
=== Climate ===
Villanueva has a BWk (Semi-arid cold steppe climate) under the Köppen climate classification system. Under the Trewartha climate classification Villanueva has a BSK (Semi-arid steppe with hot summers and cool winters). Precipitation in the community is concentrated from May to October although an average of 23 inches (580 mm) of snow is received each winter.

Climate data for Villanueva, New Mexico 1,789 metres (5,869 ft) above sea level
Month	Jan	Feb	Mar	Apr	May	Jun	Jul	Aug	Sep	Oct	Nov	Dec	Year
Mean daily maximum °C (°F)	10.0 (50.0)	11.7 (53.0)	15.6 (60.0)	20.0 (68.0)	24.4 (76.0)	31.1 (88.0)	31.7 (89.0)	30.6 (87.0)	27.2 (81.0)	21.1 (70.0)	15.0 (59.0)	8.9 (48.0)	20.6 (69.1)
Daily mean °C (°F)	2.5 (36.5)	3.9 (39.0)	6.9 (44.5)	10.6 (51.0)	15.8 (60.5)	21.1 (70.0)	23.1 (73.5)	22.2 (72.0)	18.3 (65.0)	12.5 (54.5)	6.7 (44.0)	1.7 (35.0)	12.1 (53.8)
Mean daily minimum °C (°F)	−5 (23)	−4 (25)	−2 (29)	1 (34)	7 (45)	11 (52)	14 (58)	14 (57)	9 (49)	4 (39)	−2 (29)	−6 (22)	3.6 (38.5)
Average precipitation mm (inches)	13 (0.51)	13 (0.51)	18 (0.71)	25 (0.98)	40 (1.57)	41 (1.61)	66 (2.60)	74 (2.91)	41 (1.61)	30 (1.18)	17 (0.67)	24 (0.94)	401 (15.80)

== Demographics ==
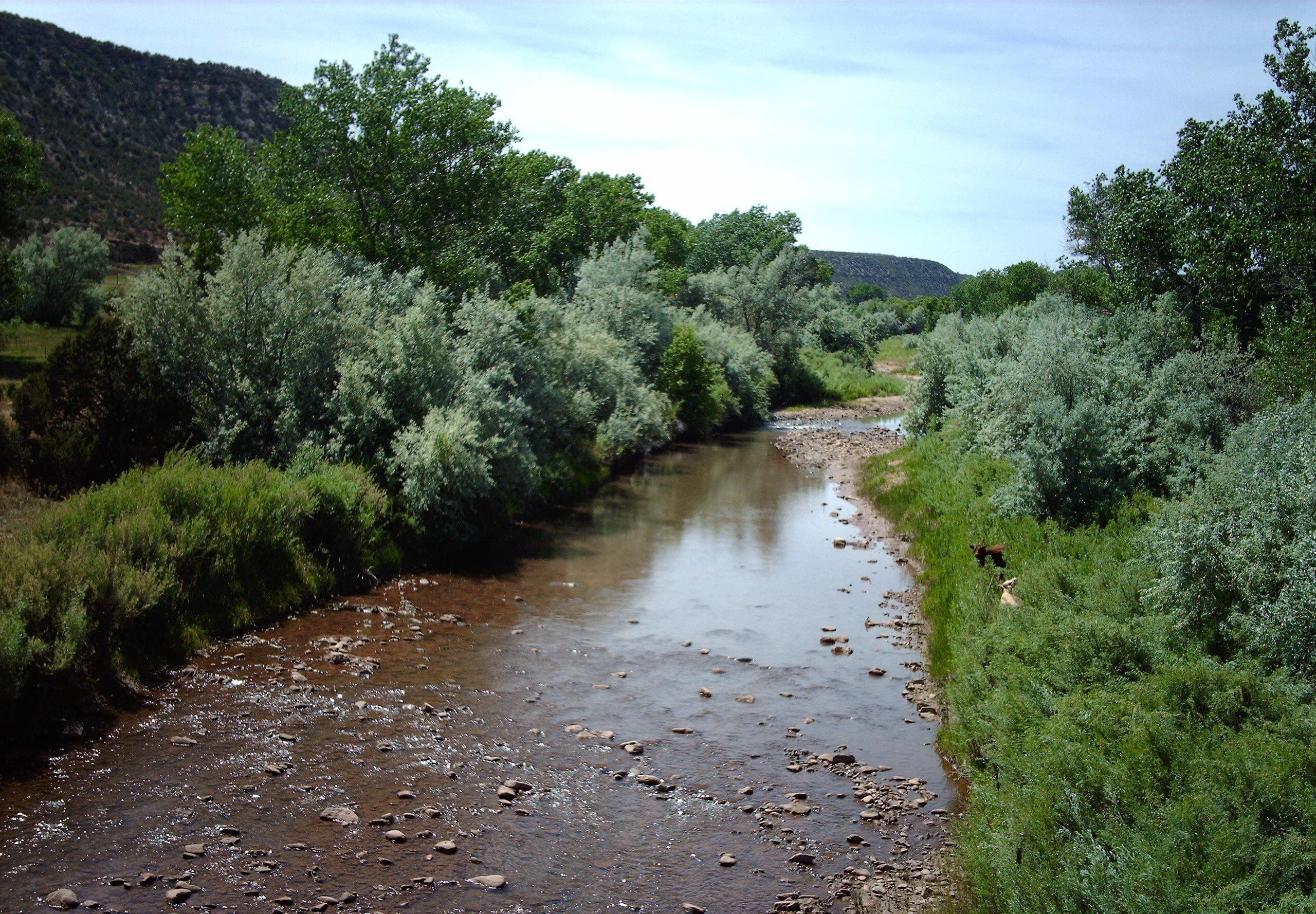
The Pecos River at Villanueva.

Historical population
Census	Pop.	Note	%±
2020	207		—
U.S. Decennial Census

== Area attractions ==
East of Villanueva is Villanueva State Park, a colorful canyon cut by the Pecos River.

== Education ==
It is in the West Las Vegas Schools school district. West Las Vegas High School is the area high school.
