= Great Plains First Nations trading networks =

The Great Plains First Nations trading networks encountered by the first Europeans on the Great Plains were built on a number of trading centers acting as hubs in an advanced system of exchange over great distances. The primary centers were found at the villages of the Mandan, Hidatsa, and Arikara, with a surplus of agricultural produce that could be exchanged. Secondary centers were found at the villages of the Pawnee, Kansa, and Osage on the central great plains, and at the Caddo villages on the southern plains. The Dakota rendezvous was an important annual trading fair among the Sioux. European demand for fur changed the relations of the plains, increased the occurrence of war, and displaced several First Nations that were forced away by the Sioux coming from the east. On the northern plains, European trade lay in the hands of the Hudson's Bay Company, although most of the territory belonged to France, and later Spain. European trade on the central plains was controlled by French merchants, first from New Orleans, later from St. Louis. From the mid-1700s', the Comanche became an increasingly important military and commercial factor on the southern plains, forcing the Apaches into the mountains, and exchanging goods and spoils with the Southwestern trading networks hubs in New Mexico.

== Geographical and tribal structure ==
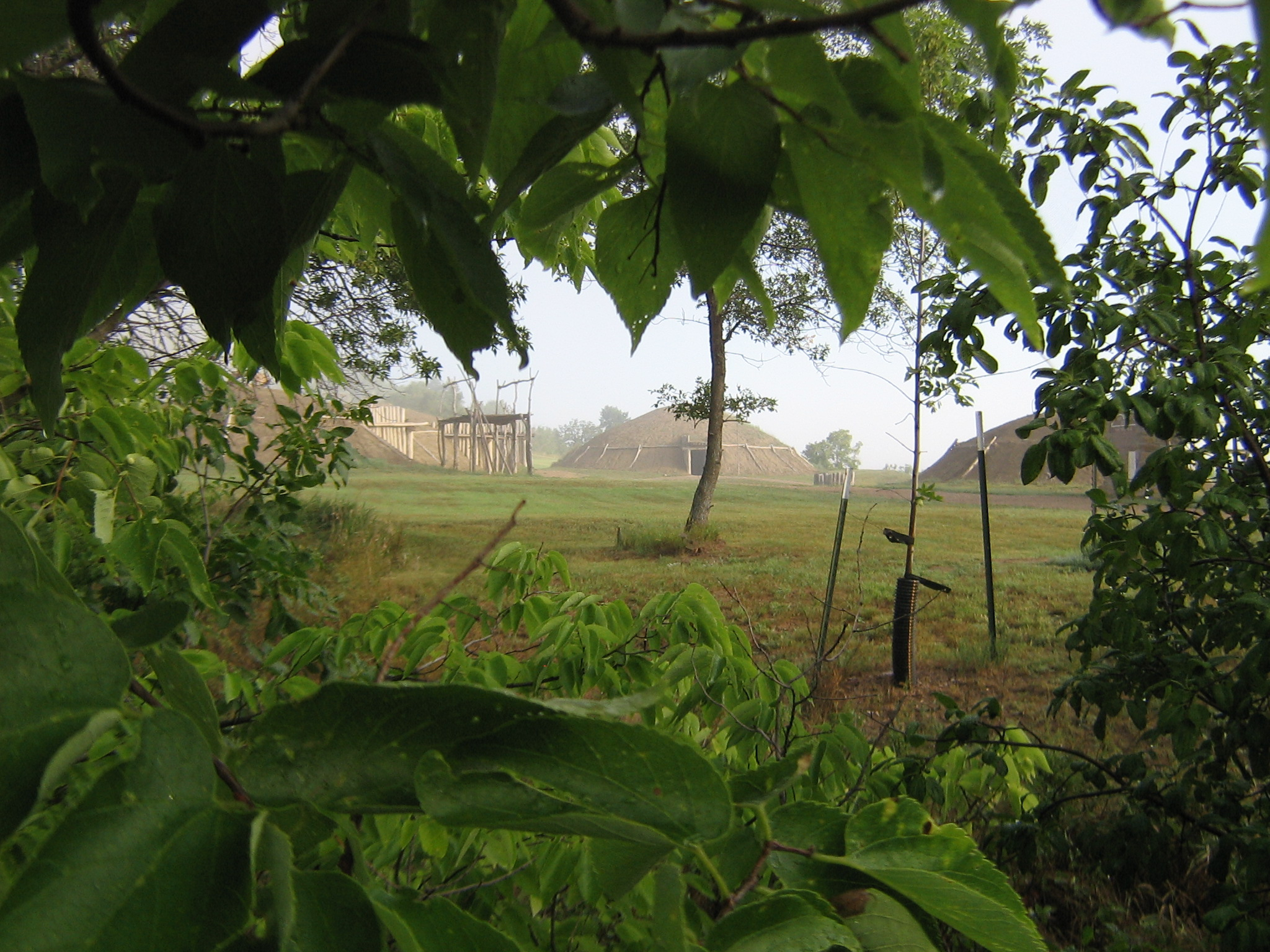
Mandan village.

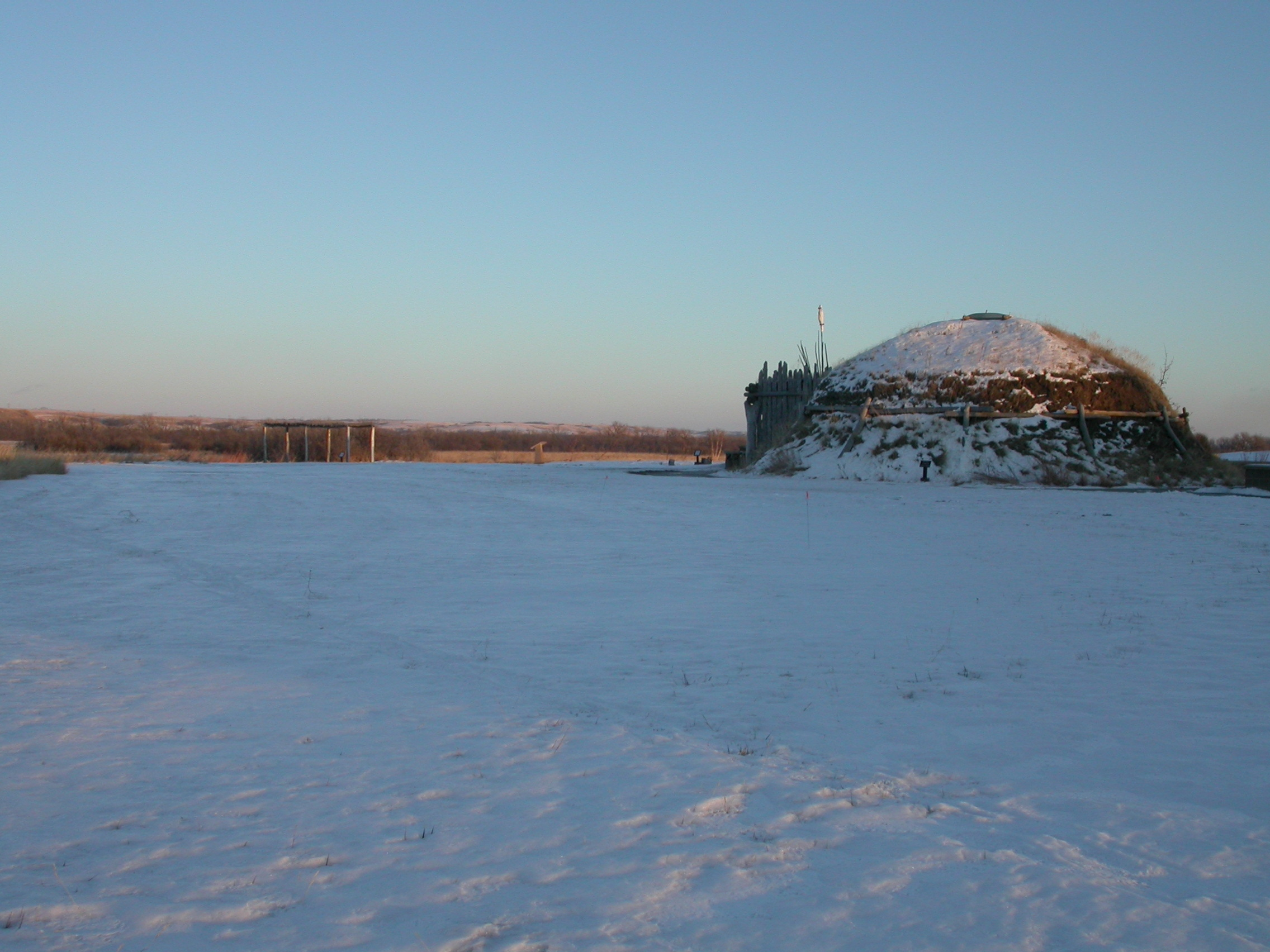
Hidatsa village.

The trading networks encountered by the first Europeans on the Great Plains were built on a number of trading centers acting as hubs in an advanced system of exchange over great distances. The major centers were found at the villages of sedentary peoples with a surplus of agricultural produce that could be exchanged. Treasured commodities such as marine shells, obsidian, and turquoise were transported thousands of miles from their origin.

The primary trading centers were found on the middle Missouri River, at the villages of the Mandans, Hidatsa, and Arikara. The central place of these villages in the exchange system was based on an advantageous geographical position combined with a surplus from agriculture and craft. Historical sources show that the Middle Missouri villages were visited by Cree, Assiniboine, Crow, Cheyenne, Arapaho, Kiowa, Plains Apache, and Comanche. The Arikara villages were also frequented by the Sioux. South of the Arikara the Sioux gathered at the Dakota Rendezvous, an annual fair exchanging goods acquired from other First Nations. The villages of the Pawnee, Kansa, and Osage were secondary centers on the central plains. On the southern plains, the Caddo villages formed important secondary centers whose westward exchange connected the Plains trading networks with the Southwestern trading networks.

Important middlemen in the exchange system were Assiniboine and Cree, who connected the Mandan, Hidatsa and Arikara trading centers with the Northern Plains, and with the forest peoples north of Lake Superior. The Sioux brought goods from the Dakota Rendezvous to the Arikara, while the Kansa acted as intermediaries between the Osage and the Pawnee. The Cheyenne were intermediaries between the Comanches and the Plains Apaches, and the primary trading centers on the Middle Missouri, thereby connecting them with the Shoshone Rendezvous and the Great Basin trading networks. On the southern plains, the Comanche became an all-important factor after their arrival.

== European trade and technology ==
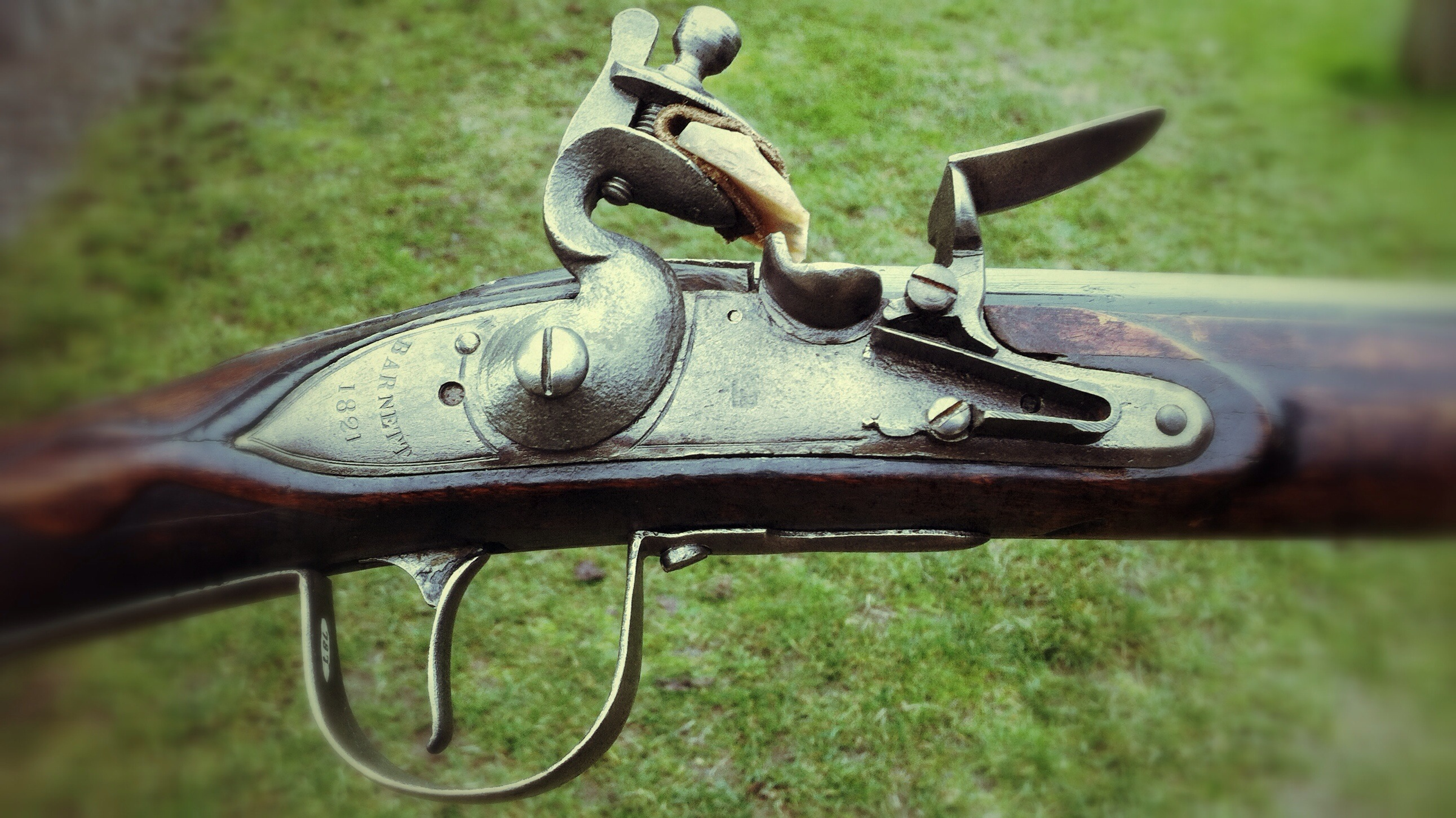
North West Company trade gun.

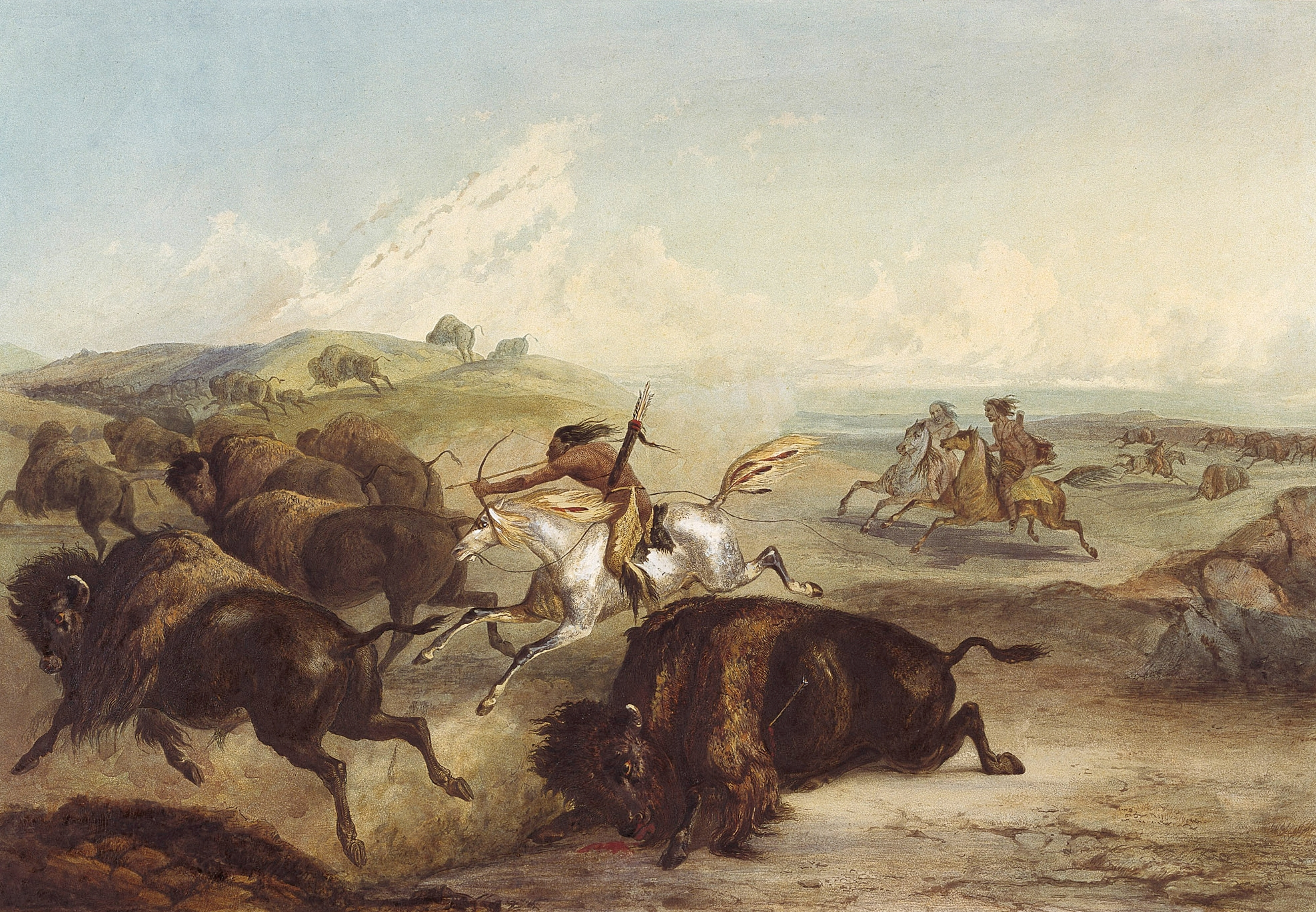
Horseback Bison hunt.

European demand for fur transformed the economic relations of the Great Plains First Nations from a subsistence economy to an economy largely influenced by market forces, thereby increasing the occurrence of conflicts and war among the Great Plains First Nations as they struggled to control access to natural resources and trade routes. The horse replaced the dog as a beast of burden, increased the efficacy of the bison hunt, and became a valuable tool of war. The horse did not reach the Great Plains until after the Pueblo Revolt in 1680 when thousands of horses began to spread north and then, through the Shoshone Rendezvous reached the Great Plains trading networks and the villages of the Mandan, Hidatsa, and Arikara, as well as the Dakota Rendezvous, and then to the farthest reaches of the trading networks. The musket, also distributed through the Mandan, Hidatsa and Arikara villages, gave its owners military superiority easily converted into control of natural resources and trade routes. During the 18th century, First Nations with trade guns displaced First Nations without firearms in a process that radically changed the ethnography of the Great Plains. The horse spread from south to north and from west to east, while the musket spread from north to south and from east to west. Yet it was not until 1850 that the distribution of horses and guns overlapped.

== Northern Great Plains ==
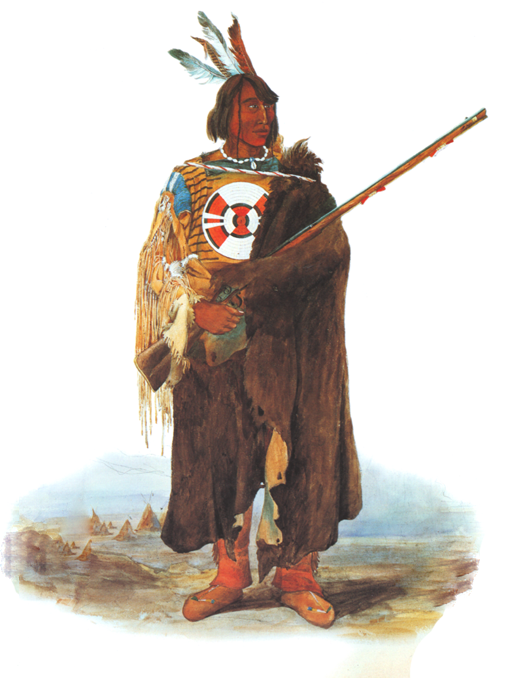
Assiniboine

Although most of the northern plains belonged to French and later Spanish Louisiana, the Louisiana merchants failed to convert the formal sovereignty into trade with the Great Plains First Nations north of the Osages. Rather, it was the Hudson's Bay Company (HBC) that dominated the area commercially. English muskets were much-coveted articles that changed the balance of power between the First Nations. During the 18th century, mounted Shoshone controlled the northern Great Plains, but through Assiniboine middlemen Blackfoot, Gros Ventre and Sarcee acquired HBC trade guns, and forced the Shoshone back to the mountains. Mandan, Hidatsa and Arikara direct trade with the HBC was principally through Brandon House, after its foundation at the end of the 18th century. Efficient competitors of the HBC did not come from Louisiana, but from the North West Company of Montreal.

At the end of the 17th century, Cree and the Assiniboine became intermediaries between the HBC and more distant First Nations; maintaining their position with the aid of English muskets. The two nations formed a close alliance in war and trade, further strengthened by the enmity of the French and the Sioux. The Sioux were during the 18th century gradually forced westward by the Cree and the Ojibwe, who had access to firearms, moving into the plains and transforming their economy and culture from a Woodland to a Plains pattern, at the same time forcing the Cheyenne further west.

== Central Great Plains ==
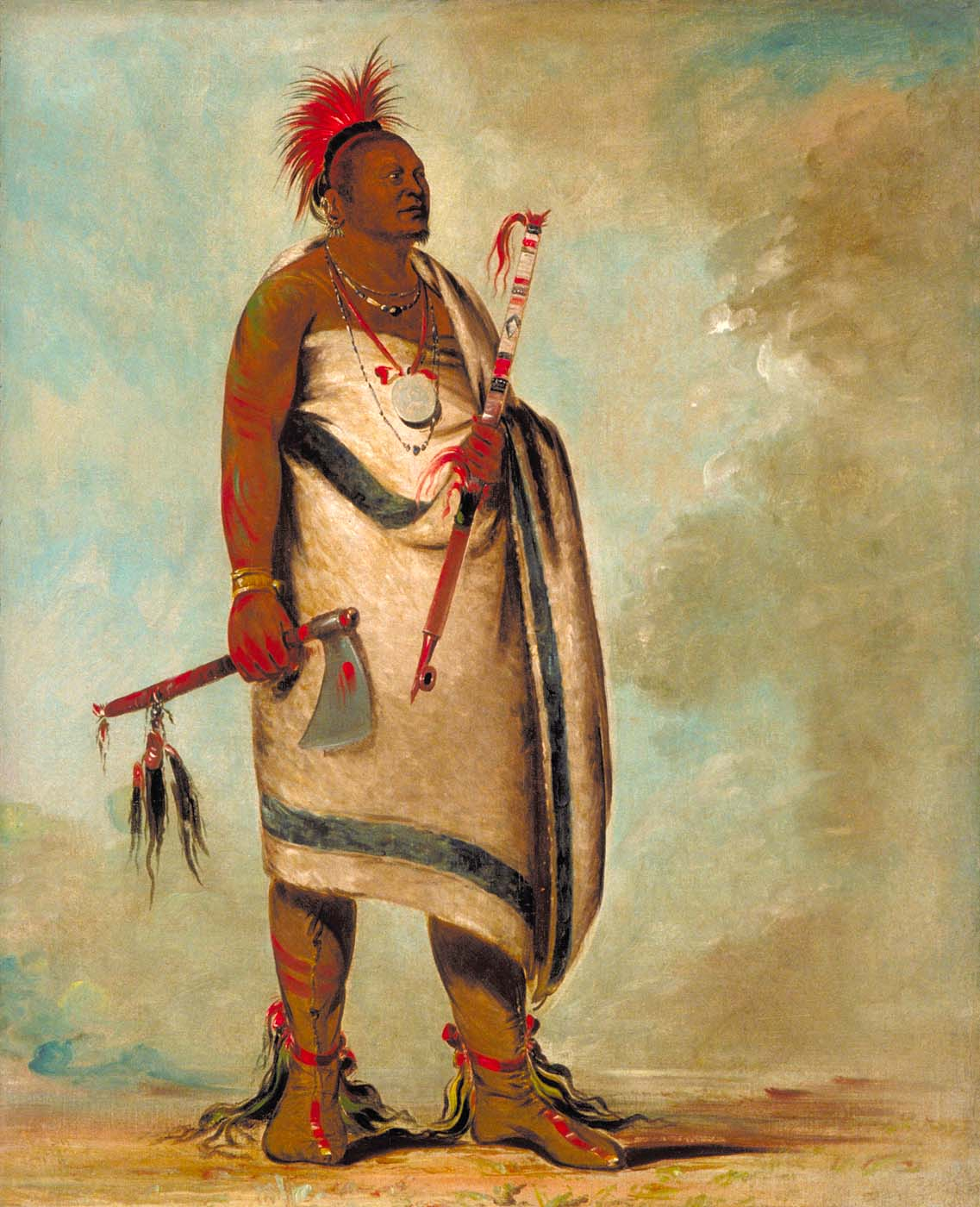
Osage

France dominated the trade in European goods on the central plains. The French were successful in maintaining the amiable relations with the First Nations necessary for trade, adjusting their behaviour to the social mores expected, and never trying to replace existing intermediaries in the trade networks. Generous gifts of trade guns and other articles of trade to First Nation leaders and their families smoothed commercial negotiations. The first French contacts with the central plains nations took place at the end of the 17th century, but commercial success had to wait until the foundation of New Orleans in 1718.

Increased French activities on the central plains compelled the Spanish governor of New Mexico to dispatch the Villasur expedition in 1720. Its massacre by the Pawnee marked the end of the Spanish influence in the area. Bourgmont founded Fort Orleans in 1724. Pawnee and Osage become the most important allies and trading partners of the French, who depended on them in order to reach their commercial goals. Yet, these First Nations did not allow the French to trade directly with nations further west.

After the Fourth Intercolonial War, France ceded Canada to the United Kingdom and Louisiana to Spain. French merchants from St. Louis, now Spanish subjects, continued to be masters of the trade with the central plains peoples. The main aim of the Spanish authorities was to retain sovereignty of the area, and ward off British and Canadian commercial intrusions, using proven French diplomatic methods.

== Southern Great Plains ==
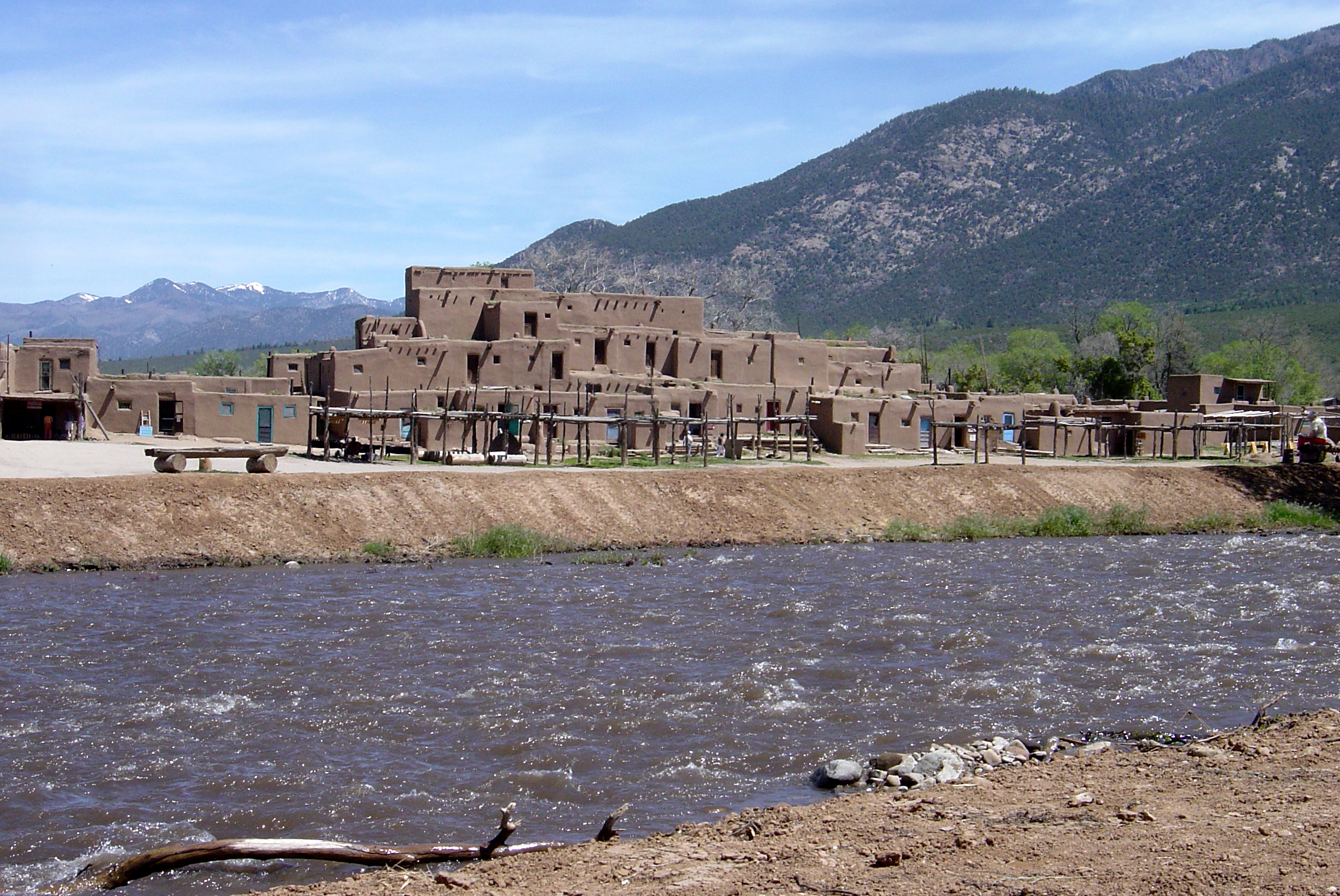
Pueblo de Taos was a hub in the Southwestern trading network, connecting with the Great Plains network through the Comanche.

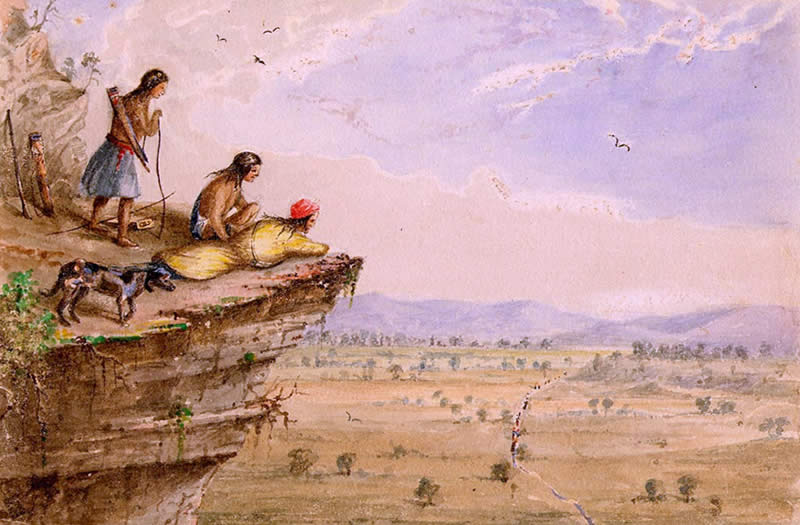
Comanche observing a trade caravan on the southern plains.

The Southwestern trading networks were not damaged by the Spanish takeover of New Mexico in 1582. Spanish road building improved transportation and the major trading centers of the Zuñi Pueblo and the Pecos Pueblo came under protection of the Spanish crown. The Spanish demand for fur was partially met on the southern plains, in exchange for European goods that spread over large areas, yet without any major changes in the indigenous cultures. The Spanish accepted the coexistence of cooperating but separate European and First Nation lifestyles.

After the Pueblo Revolt, the Southwestern trading networks grew in importance for the Spanish due to the Comanche trade. In the 1720s exchange with the Comanche formed an essential part of the New Mexico economy. In the mid-1700s, the French began to supply the Comanche with muskets, allowing them to force the Apache from the plains toward the Pueblo and Spanish settlements. The Spanish changed their firearms policy and began to sell guns and ammunition to the Comanche, in order to acquire their friendship and making them dependent on a technology they could not reproduce. De Anza's treaty with the Comanche in 1786 brought peace to New Mexico. The Comanche continued, however, to raid Texas and Coahuila, bringing their spoils north and into the Southwestern trading system. The Comanche visited the Southwestern trading centers, but also relied on the Comancheros to act as intermediaries with the Spanish and the Pueblos. The peace also favoured the Ciboleros, New Mexico bison hunters that brought robes and meat into the trading system.

== See also ==
- United States Government Fur Trade Factory System
