= José Manrique =

Governor of New Mexico from 1808 to 1814

60th Spanish Governor of New Mexico
- In office 1808–1814
- Preceded by: Alberto Maynez
- Succeeded by: Alberto Maynez

José Manrique was the Governor of New Mexico from 1808 to 1814 during the period just before the Republic of Mexico gained independence from Spain.

== Career ==
Manrique's predecessor as New Mexico Governor, Joaquín del Real Alencaster, made himself unpopular by raising taxes and suppressing the smuggling of contraband. One source says that in 1808 Manrique started to raise a militia company in Santa Fe, which he said was for local defense. He was jailed by Alencaster. Later that year Alencaster was removed from office, and don Alberto Maynez was made the interim Governor.

Records are scanty and dates are uncertain. Maynez has been identified as acting governor from 1807 to 1808. He was succeeded by Manrique, who perhaps for a while was acting Governor while Alencaster remained technically the Governor.

Manrique continued Maynez's policy of letting the New Mexico colonists embark on large-scale expeditions to trade with the Plains Indians. Apart from the economic benefits, this served to counterbalance U.S. influence. On 21 August 1809 Manrique was called to the Pecos Pueblo to parley with Comanches. Jose Manrique was concerned to prevent uprisings by the Pueblo Indians, and after 1810 supported their use of the Protector de Indios office to obtain justice, an office that had fallen out of use since around 1720 but which he revived. In March 1810 a New Mexican patrol caught a small group of traders from the United States in the north of the territory, and took them to Santa Fe. Manrique sent them down to Chihuahua, where they spent two years in jail.

It was during Manriques governorship that the first and last election was held for a representative for New Mexico in the Spanish Cortes. The main candidates were Antonio Ortiz, Juan Rafael Ortiz and Pedro Bautista Pino, with the last being chosen to make the long journey to Cádiz.

Lieutenant Colonel don José Manrique and his wife, doña Inez Tellez, are both recorded as residents of Chihuahua when they became the godparents in 1814 of Ramón Ortiz y Miera, son of Antonio Ortiz, who was later to become an influential and patriotic priest during the Mexican–American War of 1846–1848.
