= San Miguel del Vado Land Grant =

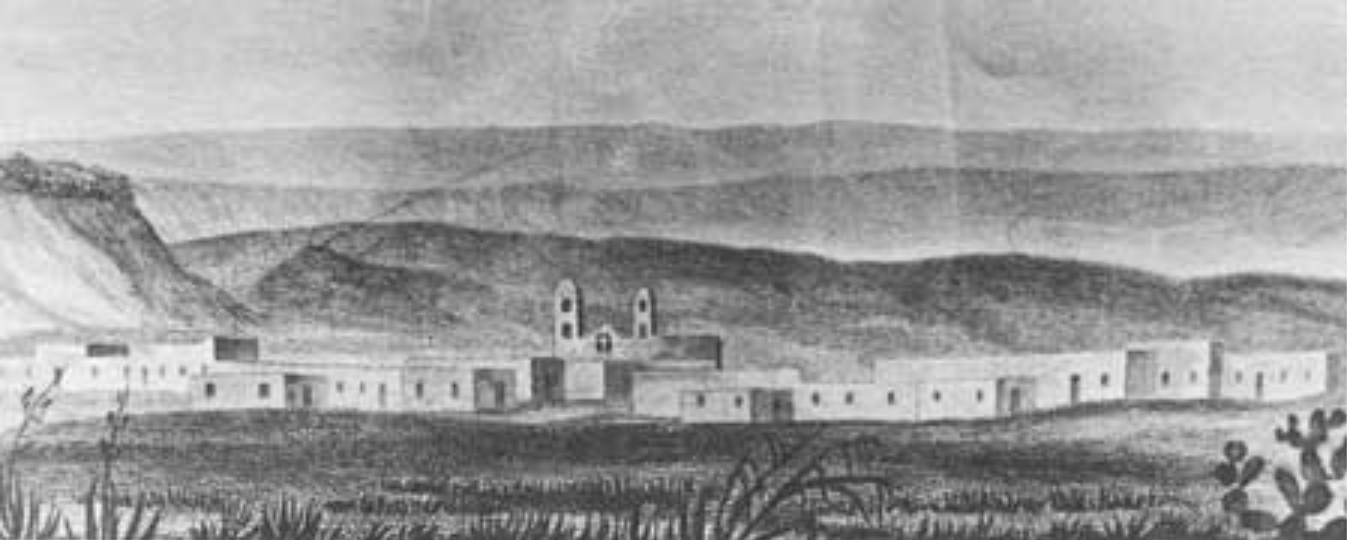
San Miguel del Vado (1846) Facing toward the west, from the Report of J. W. Albert of his Examination of New Mexico in the Years 1846-1847

The San Miguel del Vado Land Grant (also known as the San Miguel del Bado Land Grant) is one of the Spanish land grants in New Mexico. On November 24, 1794, 53 men submitted a petition for land and were granted temporary possession on November 24, 1794, pending satisfaction of prescribed criteria. A second grant was obtained by 58 men and their respective families on March 12, 1803. Two days later, the procedure was repeated at San José del Vado, 6 kilometres (3.7 mi) north of San Miguel del Vado, distributing farm land to an additional 47 heads of household, including two women.

Thirteen of the original men who applied for the grant were genízaros, Native Americans who had been captured or sold into slavery. Some of them had complained of poor conditions and were granted lands by the governor for farming and grazing and to provide a buffer of protection against the raids of Plains Indians, primarily Comanche, who were menacing towns such as Santa Fé. In 1896, the Supreme Court decreed in United States v. Sandoval to reduce the land in the grant from the surveyor general's estimated 315,000 acres, including common lands, to little more than 5,000 acres then under private ownership.

== History ==
This land grant was in the vicinity of the Pecos River, below the Pecos Pueblo, which was eventually abandoned by the dwindling population of Native Americans, the remnants of which moved to Jemez Pueblo in 1838. A vado or bado is a word for a place where a river is forded. This vado was a meeting place for trade between the Plains and Pueblo tribes. It was a passage through the Sangre de Cristo Mountains for the Puebloan peoples of the Rio Grande valley to access the plains for buffalo hunting. It became the passage for the later Spanish explorers, comancheros and other frontier traders, ciboleros and other buffalo hunters, Indian fighters, the Santa Fe Trail, Civil War armies, and later still for the southern route of the transcontinental railroad.

In 1540, Pecos Pueblo (then known as Cicuique) had been the only pueblo to send a delegation of about 20 men, led by Bigotes, to respond to Coronado's open invitation to the Pueblo Peoples to meet with him at the Zuni Pueblos (Seis Ciudades de Cíbola) following his "Conquest of Cíbola". Bigotes' men were multilingual and traveled as traders, emissaries, and spies. They enticed Coronado to appoint Captain Hernando de Alvarado to further expeditions eastward. Under this guidance, the Spanish saw the Tiwa Pueblos of the Rio Grande valley. Then they ventured further to Bigotes' Cicuique pueblo on the Pecos river, and through the mountain passage below, to see the plains buffalo further east.

The first permanent Spanish settlement in northern New Mexico was led by Juan de Oñate in the summer of 1598. Oñate's pobladores or colonists extended El Camino Real de Tierra Adentro over 600 miles, reaching the San Juan Pueblo (currently Ohkay Owingeh) in the Tewa province and establishing the Hispanic settlement of San Gabriel in the Tewa pueblo of Yunque on the Rio Grande. Oñate rewarded the pobladores with encomiendas or grants of Indian labor, for meritorious service, obligating these encomenderos to defend the Pueblos and provide them religious instruction. In return for these services, Pueblo peoples were required to pay a tax, or ‘tribute.’ Prior to the Pueblo Revolt, Pecos was considered to be the richest encomienda due mainly to the procurement and export of buffalo hides from the plains. Pecos Pueblo had long been a hub for trade between Plains Indians to the east and the Pueblo peoples to the west. In 1583 the Chamuscado-Rodríguez party described Pecos Pueblo as the finest and largest of the pueblos seen by the party. Pecos Pueblo may have housed a garrison of ten Spanish soldiers and their family members from 1750 until the establishment of the San Miguel del Vado Grant.

In 1794, the San Miguel petition was submitted with the partial truth that this was a genízaro settlement, in order to provide more viable argument for attaining the grant. The site was described as being about 20 miles downstream and southeast of Pecos pueblo, where the trail to the plains crossed the river, with sufficient space for both the petitioners and some of the more destitute residents of the province.

The criteria to be met by the grantees were as follows:

First. That the tract aforesaid has to be in common, not only in regard to themselves, but also to all the settlers who may join them in the future. Second. That with respect to the dangers of the place, they shall have to keep themselves equipped with firearms, and bows and arrows, in which they shall be inspected as well at the time of settling as at any time the alcalde [local head government official] in office may deem proper, provided that after two years settlement all the arms they have must be firearms, under the penalty that all who do not comply with this requirement shall be sent out of the settlement. Third. That the plaza they may construct shall be according as expressed in their petition; and in the mean time they shall reside in the pueblo of Pecos, where there are sufficient accommodations for the aforesaid fifty-two families. Fourth. That to the alcalde in office in said pueblo they shall set apart a small, separate piece of these lands for him to cultivate for himself at his will, without their children or successors making any objection thereto; and the same for his successor in office. Fifth. That the construction of their plaza, as well as the opening of acequias [irrigation ditches], and all other work that may be deemed proper for the common welfare, shall be performed by the community with that union which in their government they must preserve.

The boundaries were described as:

in the north the Río de la Vaca from the place called La Ranchería to El Agua Caliente; in the south El Cañón Blanco; in the east La Cuesta and Los Cerritos de Bernal; and in the west the place commonly called El Gusano (South San Isidro).

Following a period of about 20 years of development to meet the grant requirements, individual parcels of land were allotted by don Pedro Bautista Pino in the name of Governor Chacón's verbal order of March 12, 1803. Pino measured the total distance along the river that was under irrigation with the aid of his assistant José Miguel Tafoya. After setting aside a portion of land for grazing their livestock and sheep as commons and additional land for future inhabitants to cultivate under oversight of the justice of the precinct, the remainder was divided by the number of families to obtain the number of suertes or chances, and heads of families drew lots for their repartos or shares, which they were not allowed to sell for a period of ten years. Two days later, he repeated a similar procedure at the settlement of San José del Vado, three miles upstream from San Miguel, distributing farm land to an additional forty-five men and two women as heads of household. On March 30, 1803 Governor Fernando Chacón approved the grant.

The San Miguel settlers had finished their church by 1811, and in 1812 the Pecos Pueblo priest moved to San Miguel. San Miguel's population now outnumbered the declining Pecos Pueblo which was suffering from Hispanic encroachment of their land and Comanche raids. Following the Mexican War of Independence which ended in 1821, San Miguel del Bado became the administrative headquarters for the northeastern plains region of New Mexico with the election of an ayuntamiento or town council. In 1827 a detachment of Santa Fe presidio (the only formal presidio in New Mexico in the Mexican period) soldiers stationed at San Miguel classified as a separate company for protection against Indians and to reduce Santa Fe Trail smuggling and import tax evasion. In order to pacify hostile Plains Indians, soldiers were regularly provided with lances, firearm parts and trinkets for gifts. Bishop José Antonio Laureano de Zubiría, the first bishop to visit New Mexico in 72 years, visited the San Miguel church in 1833, describing it as "utterly deprived" and noted that "this parish church lacks even the most essential things for the celebration of the divine mysteries." The customs house was moved from Santa Fe to San Miguel in 1835. This military protection encouraged permanent settlement of the Las Vegas grant. The expansion of the increasing population of San Miguel into areas further south along the Pecos River and into areas of northeastern New Mexico (such as Las Vegas, Sapello, and Ocate) was also supported in an 1831 petition to the governor by José Francisco Leyba, the parish priest of San Miguel. He also included the observation that losses of cattle and sheep growers suffered under Indians would be lessened if Las Vegas became a permanent settlement with occasional military protection. The Las Vegas grant was completed between 1835 and 1838.

During the Mexican–American War in 1846 General Kearny's forces followed the Santa Fe Trail below Bent's Fort to invade and establish a U.S. provisional government of New Mexico. Prior to reaching Santa Fe, he gave speeches from house-tops in Las Vegas, Tecolote and San Miguel, absolving the people from their allegiance to governor Manuel Armijo and Mexico. He promised protection of life, property and religion to all who would peaceably submit to the United States government, and death for those who would resist. After leaving Tecolote, the following events within the San Miguel del Vado land grant, as well as some occurring five years earlier during the 1841 Texan Santa Fe Expedition, were described.

Having marched twenty miles, we encamped within about six miles of San Miguel, near a small rancho, where we found plenty of water, wood, and fine grass for our animals. On the 16th, after a progress of six miles, we arrived at San Miguel, situated on the river Pecos, and famous as being the place near which the Texan army under command of Gen. McLeod, fell into the hands of Gen. Salezar and Gov. Armijo, in 1841. Here again Gen. Kearny, assembling the citizens of the place, as usual, on the terraced roof of some spacious building, delivered to them a stern, sententious speech, absolving them from any further allegiance to the Mexican government. When the general was about to compel them to swear fealty to our government on the sacred cross, the Alcalde and Priest objected. The general inquired the grounds of their objection. They replied, that the oath he required them to take would virtually render them traitors to their country, a sin of which they disdained to be guilty. Gen. Kearny having promised protection to their persons and property, as to other citizens of the United States, and also having threatened to subvert the town unless they should submit, they were at length induced to take the oath.

The army having proceeded about ten miles farther, encamped on the Pecos, near San José. Here the water was excellent, but the grass was indifferent. Bold springs of delicious water gush from the rocks. During the night of the 16th, while we were encamped at San José, the picket guard placed out by Col. Doniphan, took the son of the Mexican general, Salezar, prisoner. He was a spy, and was held in custody until our arrival at Santa Fé, where he was afterwards set at liberty. This prisoner's father, Gen. Salezar is the same detestable wretch who captured the Texans near Anton Chico and San Miguel, and treated them with such wanton cruelty and inhumanity.

Two other Mexican soldiers were made prisoners the same night. On the morning of the 17th, these last mentioned prisoners were by order of Gen. Kearny conducted through our camps and shown our cannon. They were then suffered to depart, and tell their own people what they had seen. To color and exaggerate accounts is a truly Mexican characteristic. They therefore returned to their comrades in arms, representing our number at 5,000 men, and declaring we had so many pieces of cannon, that they could not count them. This highly colored account of our strength, no doubt spread dismay through their ranks, and increased the desertions from Armijo's standard, which were already going on to an extent well calculated to alarm him.

Donaciano Vigil had, over a 25-year military career, advanced from private to eventually become captain and company commander of the San Miguel del Bado militia. He had participated in the capture of the Texas Santa Fe expedition, and was the officer who protested against governor Armijo's order to disband the troops he had positioned at Apache Canyon to resist Kearny's approaching forces.

In April 1849 the Santa Fe native Father Ramón Ortiz y Miera, who had earlier voted against ratifying the Treaty of Guadalupe Hidalgo as a member of the Mexican congress, arrived in New Mexico from Chihuahua in the capacity of commissioner for repatriation of families wishing to emigrate to Mexico. He reported that upon his arrival in San Miguel del Vado, the people of the town submitted 900 requests for repatriation assistance out of a total of only 1,000 families. His statement read, "they preferred to lose all rather than belong to a government in which they had fewer guarantees and were treated with more disregard than the African race." The U.S. provisional government, represented by Governor John M. Washington and Secretary Donaciano Vigil, responded to this report of potential depopulation by officially discouraging all New Mexicans from emigration, and appropriating the function of obtaining petition signatures from potential emigrants. They prohibited Father Ortiz from further solicitations.

== Annual Report of the Dept. of the Interior (1887) ==
Summary report is as follows:

No. 119.—San Miguel del Bado; Lorenzo Marquez et al. Preliminary survey, 315,300.80 acres. The grant was made to fifty-two persons whose names are specified, and distribution was made in the act of judicial possession among fifty-eight heads of families. The surveyor-general finds the grant valid and recommends confirmation to the heirs and legal representatives of the persons named in the distribution. In reference to quantity, he states that it was not the practice of the Spanish government to make grants of large tracts of land at the date of this concession. I find upon examining the allotments that the whole area to which title was given to the fifty-eight persons was 61 acres, being a house and garden lot for each. The cultivable and grazing lands were common. I have recommended confirmation to the extent only of the land reduced by grantees to their actual use and occupancy, to be ascertained by additional evidence and survey.

The report "San Miguel Del Bado" to Honorable L. Q. G. Lamar, Secretary of the Interior, May 13, 1887 under the section "New Mexico Private Land Claims," follows verbatim:

I have the honor to transmit herewith for submission to Congress the supplementary report dated December 6, 1886, in duplicate, of the surveyor-general for New Mexico, on the private-land claim known as the San Miguel del Bado, reported No. 119.

Under date of November 13, 1879, Surveyor-General Atkinson in a report upon this claim approved the grant to "the heirs, legal representatives, and assigns of Lorenzo Marquez as grantee, to whom it is recommended it be confirmed by Congress."

A preliminary survey of this claim was made in the year 1879 and covers an area of 315,300.80 acres.

Surveyor-General Julian in his supplementary report recommends "the confirmation of the grant to the heirs and legal representatives of Lorenzo Marquez for themselves and in trust for the heirs and legal representatives of the several heads of families referred to in the distribution specified."

Upon an examination of the record in the case, which consists of copies of alleged originals, it is found that under date of March 18, 1857, Faustin Baca y Ortiz (juez de paz), for and in the name of the inhabitants of the settlements of La Cuesta, San Miguel, Las Mulas, El Pueblo, Puertecito, San José, el Gasano y Bernal, filed his notice with the surveyor-general of New Mexico claiming title to a tract of land within said Territory under an alleged grant from the governor of New Mexico, dated November 25, 1794, to Lorenzo Marques and fifty-one others. The boundaries of said grant are "on the north El Rio do la Baca desde a donde llaman la Rancheria hasta el agua Caliente, on the south El Cañon Blanco, on the east La Cuesta con los cerritos de Bernal, and on the west el paraje que comúnmente llaman el Guzano."

On November 25, 1794, Governor Chacon directed the principal alcalde of the town of Santa Fé, Antonio José Ortiz, to execute the grant as requested, so that they, their children and successors may have, hold, and possess the same, in the name of His Majesty, at the same time observing the conditions and requisites required in such cases and especially that relative to not injuring third parties.

On November 26, 1794, Antonio José Ortiz, in company with two witnesses and the fifty-two petitioners, informed them of the conditions upon which the grant was made and proceeded to place them in possession of the land solicited, giving the boundaries as described in their petition.

On March 12, 1803, Pedro Bantista Pino, justice of second vote of the town of Santa Fé and its jurisdiction, by verbal order of Colonel Fernando Chacon, governor of New Mexico, proceeded to the settlement "for the purpose of distributing the lands which are under cultivation to all the individuals who occupy said settlement, and having examined the aforesaid cultivated land I [he] measured the whole of it from north to south, and then proceeded to lay off and divide the several portions with the concurrence of all the parties interested until the matter was placed in order according to the means myself and the parties interested deemed the best adapted to the purpose, in order that all should be satisfied with their possessions, although said land is very much broken on account of the many bends in the river. And after the portions were equally divided in the best manner possible, I [he] caused them to draw lots, and each individual drew his portion and the number of varas contained in each one portion was set down, as will appear from the accompanying list, which contains the number of the individuals who reside in this precinct, amounting to the number of fifty-eight families, between whom all the land was divided, excepting only the portion appertaining to the justice of this precinct, as appears by the possession given by the said governor; and another small surplus portion which by the consent of all is set aside for the benefit of the blessed souls in purgatory on the condition that the products are to be applied annually to the payment of three masses, the certificates for which are to be delivered to the alcalde in office of said jurisdiction.

"And after having made the distribution I [he] proceeded to mark out the boundaries of said tract from north to south, being on the north a hill situated at the edge of the river above the mouth of the ditch which irrigates said lands, and on the south the point of the hill of Pueblo and the valley called Temporales, a large portion of land remaining to the south, which is very necessary for the inhabitants of this town who may require more land to cultivate, which shall be done by the consent of the justice of said town who is charged with the care and trust of this matter, giving to each one of those contained in the list the amount he may require and can cultivate; and after having completed all the foregoing I caused them all to be collected together and notified them that they must each immediately erect mounds of stone on the boundaries of their land so as to avoid disputes; and I also notified them that no one was privileged to sell or dispose of their and until the expiration of ten years from this date, as directed by said governor, who, if he be so pleased, will certify his proper approval at the foot of this document, of which a copy shall remain in this town and the original be deposited in the archives where it properly belongs," &c.

On March 30, 1803, Governor Chacon approved the action of the justice in the following terms:

"By virtue of what has been done by Pedro Pino, senior justice of second vote of this capital town of Santa Fé, concerning the distribution of lands made in the name of His Majesty to the residents of the new town of El Bado known as San Miguel, I declare the aforesaid residents of El Bade the lawful owners thereof, approving and confirming the possession given by said senior justice Pedro Pino and in order that it may so appear in all time," &c.

This list of individuals who occupied the town of San Miguel del Bado del Rio do Pecos comprises some 58 persons, opposite whose names is stated the number of varas assign to each.

Assuming that the persons were placed in possession of square tracts the aggregate number of square varas would be about 353,000 or about 61 acres.

These allotments of land were situate on the Pecos river—with the following boundaries: "On the north a hill situated at the edge of the river above the mouth of the ditch which irrigates said lands, and on the south the point of the hill of Pueblo and the valley called Temporales."

At the time this grant was made it was not the practice of the Spanish government to make grants of such large tracts of land.

I am of the opinion that the survey of this grant is grossly in excess of the quantity granted. I would respectfully suggest that in the event of the confirmation of this claim by Congress it be limited to the extent of the land reduced to actual possession and occupancy, to be ascertained by additional evidence and survey.

== United States v. Sandoval (1896) ==
Not to be confused with United States v. Sandoval, 231 U.S. 28 (1913)

Malcolm Ebright provides the following introduction for this case.

When the inhabitants of the village asked the surveyor general for confirmation of the grant, he recommended that the entire grant be confirmed. Later the United States General Land Office commissioner recommended that only the occupied lands on the grant should be confirmed, which would mean the rejection of the common lands—the bulk of the land within the grant. But when the Court of Private Land Claims took the opposite view and confirmed the entire grant, the government immediately appealed the decision to the Supreme Court.

The May 24, 1897, Supreme Court ruling in for United States v. Sandoval was summarized as follows. "Under the laws of the Indies lands not actually allotted to settlers remained the property of the king, to be disposed of by him or by those on whom he might confer that power; and as, at the date of the Treaty of Guadalupe Hidalgo, neither the municipalities nor the settlers within them, whose rights are the subject of controversy in these suits, could have demanded the legal title of the former Government, the Court of Private Land Claims was not empowered to pass the title to either, but it is for the political department [ Congress ] of the Government to deal with any equitable rights which may be involved." The ruling thus reduced the size of the grant from over 300,000 acres with the common lands of the municipality included, to the little more than the 5,000 acres then under private ownership.

The case was heard by the Supreme Court during its October term in 1896, under Chief Justice Fuller with associate justices Field, Harlan, Gray, Brewer, Brown, Shiras, White, and Peckham. The petition was filed in the Court of Private Land Claims by Julian Sandoval and others from eight villages (La Cuesta, San Miguel, Las Mulas, El Pueblo, Puerticita, San José, El Gusano, and Bernal) within the 315,000 acres bounded within the grant requested for confirmation. The land was alleged to have been granted by Governor Fernando Chacón on November 25, 1794 to Lorenzo Marguez in the name of fifty-one men accompanying him. Copies of the governor's decree on that date, and of reports by the officiating alcalde Oritiz dated November 26, 1794 and by the more recent alcalde Pino, in 1893. Also submitted were a report made to Congress on November 13, 1879, and a survey made of the tract, July 26, 1880, with a statement that no action has been taken by Congress either to confirmation of rejection of the grant.

The petitioners claimed to have settled the grant in accordance with its contracted terms and had continued as a municipal corporation, embracing all of the land within the exterior boundaries of the grant, up to the time that the New Mexico Territory was ceded to the United States, and that the said tract was granted in common, not only to the petitioners, but to all other settlers who might join them in the future. They argued further that the grant had since been occupied by the original settlers, their descendants and assigns, and others who have become part of that settlement within its exterior boundaries, and "has always been recognized as being a concession made to the town or settlement of San Miguel del Bado and all other settlers who might join them in the future... to be held and used by them in common, except as to such parts and portions as from time to time have been set apart in severalty in individual settlers thereon. That they have managed and controlled the lands of said grant by and through committees, appointed in popular assemblies... since their said municipal corporation, under the laws of Spain and Mexico, was abandoned. ...That the said individuals herein named as petitioners are the present duly authorized committee of the settlers on the said grant, and make this petition for and in behalf of themselves and all other settlers within the exterior boundaries of said grant."

The United States answered that "this plaintiff, if entitled to confirmation of anything, is entitled to confirmation only of that portion which he actually occupied and possessed under said grant, and that all the portion of said land which had not been subjected in 1846 to actual occupancy and cultivation is, and of right ought to be, public domain."

Chief Justice Fuller, after stating the case, delivered the opinion of the court and answered the following question. Did the fee to lands embraced within the limits of the pueblo and intended for community use continue to remain in the sovereign or did it pass to the pueblo? The existence of this power of control and disposition as to municipal lands in the supreme Spanish and then Mexican authority was shown by further references, and various acts of Congress were cited as enacted in view "of this state of the Spanish law and the unquestioned power lodged in the King of Spain to exercise unlimited authority over the lands assigned to a town and undisposed of and not the subject of private grant, to all of which rights the United States succeeded as successor of the King of Spain and the government of Mexico." and, citing Grisar v. McDowell, "...limited right of disposition and use was in all particulars subject to the control of the government of the country." At all events, unallotted lands were subject to the disposition of the government. ...the Court of Private Land Claims was not empowered to pass the title... It is for the political department to deal with the equitable rights involved.

Again, Ebright adds the following commentary to the above ruling.

This was an important test case for the government, for if the common lands of this grant were rejected, hundreds of thousands—perhaps millions—of acres of other community grant common lands not yet adjudicated would also belong to the government, not to the land grant heirs. ...holding that the common lands belonged to the government of the United States... It appears that the Supreme Court was in error on this point of Spanish and Mexican law... After the 1897 Sandoval decision, the land claims court rejected the common lands of every community grant that came up for adjudication.

Ebright also argues with respect to northern New Mexico land grants, that legal precedents in support for common lands as property of local communities, separate and apart from property of the Spanish crown or Mexican government, was well supported by archival information that was available at the time of this ruling, but was collected and collated by historians and legal experts (to include himself) only in the aftermath of this and other related rulings.

== See also ==
- Spanish land grants in New Mexico
