= Jose Tafoya =

Trader and rancher from New Mexico (c. 1834 - c. 1913)

Jose Piedad Tafoya (1834 - ca. 1913), sometimes called the Prince of the Comancheros, was one of the more notable traders from New Mexico who traveled throughout the Southern Great Plains exchanging goods with the Comanches and their allies the Kiowa for stolen horses, cattle, and sometimes human captives.

According to legend, he was seven feet tall. He was born in La Cuesta, New Mexico in 1834 and first visited the Great Plains as early as 1859. In the 1850s, he operated a sheep ranch in San Miguel County, New Mexico. His first wife was Maria de Jesus Perez. They married April 20, 1863 in Anton Chico, New Mexico. In the 1860s, he operated a trading post near what is now Quitaque, Texas. In the 1870s, he began sheep herding in Texas.

He also at times acted as a scout for the US Army, possibly unwillingly. According to some sources, he was instrumental in the defeat of the Comanches at the Battle of Palo Duro Canyon. He allegedly revealed the location of Comanche camps to Colonel Ranald S. Mackenzie after being forced to do so either at the end of a rope or after being tied to a wagon wheel. Some believe that this story is mythical. Mackenzie credited another Comanchero scout named Johnson for finding the camps. Tafoya also participated in the ill-fated Buffalo Soldier tragedy of 1877. In 1879, he accompanied Lt. John L. Bullis on an expedition into southern New Mexico in pursuit of a band of marauding Lipan and Mescalero Apaches.

By the 1880s, he had left Texas and was once again ranching sheep in New Mexico. He appeared in the U.S. Court of Claims in 1893 along with three other former Comancheros, where they admitted to having purchased cattle marked with brands belonging to Charles Goodnight and others. He had at least four children and probably died about 1913, when his will was filed, bequeathing his house to his second wife, Teresa Baca de Tafoya.
