= Fernando Chacón =

57th Spanish Governor of New Mexico
- In office 1794–1804
- Preceded by: Fernando de la Concha
- Succeeded by: Joaquín del Real Alencaster

Personal details
- Profession: Soldier and Governor (of New Mexico)
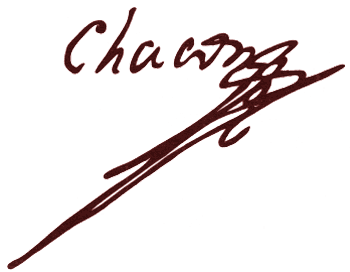
- Signature

Fernando Chacón was a Spanish soldier who served as a governor of Santa Fe de Nuevo México, modern day New Mexico, between 1794 and 1804. He was a Knight of the Order of Santiago.

== Biography ==
As a young boy, Chacón joined the Spanish Army. Eventually, he became a lieutenant colonel. He was appointed as the governor of Santa Fe de Nuevo México on August 16, 1793, assuming the charge in 1794.

Early in his administration, he signed the San Miguel del Vado Grant after a New Mexican, Lorenzo Marquez, delivered a petition to Chacón asking for a grant of land. The petition was signed by Marquez and fifty-one others. The signatories already had a parcel of land in Santa Fe, but it was too small for their communities' needs. In the petition, they sought land on both sides of the Pecos River at El Vado ("The Ford"). They had agreed to settle on the eastern border of New Mexico, where there was sufficient water and fertile lands to live well. Since this was Apache land, the petitioners agreed to provide their own firearms, as well as their own ammunition and establish bastions and towers. Chacón accepted the request and, on November 25, 1794, granted land to the petitioners. He also ordered the Mayor of Santa Fe, Antonio Jose Ortiz, to deliver legal possession of the lands to people who wanted to have them, based on the conditions and the requirements needed in such cases. In 1796, with Chacón's permission, three families founded Llano San Juan in San Juan Nepomuceno, wanting to build several towns in the place.

Moreover, after 1796, Chacón granted portions of land to 63 families in Taos, New Mexico, in the village of Pueblo Native Americans, an allied ethnicity to Spaniards, although this could have been done without the consent of the Native Americans (at least there is no evidence to indicate otherwise). Also on January 23, 1800 Chacon granted a request by thirty people of Albuquerque to settle at Cebolleta and establish a town in this place.

In 1800 Chacon organized a military campaign against the Navajo people in the Tunicha Mountains, but twenty chiefs asked for peace. However, in 1804 and 1805 both peoples clashed with each other in several military campaigns.

By decree of Nemesio Salcedo, on May 3, 1804, Chacón sent an expedition to Northern New Mexico in order to find Lewis and Clark, who had begun their exploratory trip four months earlier. The expedition, which was called "Expedition of Captain Merri", was led by Pedro Vial and José Jarvet and consisted of 52 soldiers, Spanish settlers, and Native Americans. The expedition left Santa Fe, New Mexico, on August 1.

Later in 1804, Chacón was replaced by Joaquín del Real Alencaster.
