= Fernando de la Concha =

56th Spanish Governor of New Mexico
- In office 1789–1794
- Preceded by: Juan Bautista de Anza
- Succeeded by: Fernando Chacón

Personal details
- Born: Villacarriedo, Cantabria, Spain
- Spouse: Politician

Fernando de la Concha was the Governor of New Mexico between 1789 and 1794.

== Biography ==
Fernando de la Concha joined the Spanish Army in his youth, eventually becoming a Colonel. De la Concha was appointed Governor of Santa Fe de Nuevo México in 1789. In 1792 (and following orders of the viceroy Revillagigedo) Concha sent explorers Pedro Vial, Vicente Villanueva, and Vicente Espinosa to Saint Louis to establish a trade route. This route would be later known as the Santa Fe Trail.

Fernando de la Concha was replaced by Fernando Chacón in the New Mexico government in 1794.
