= San Miguel del Vado, New Mexico =

- unincorporated community
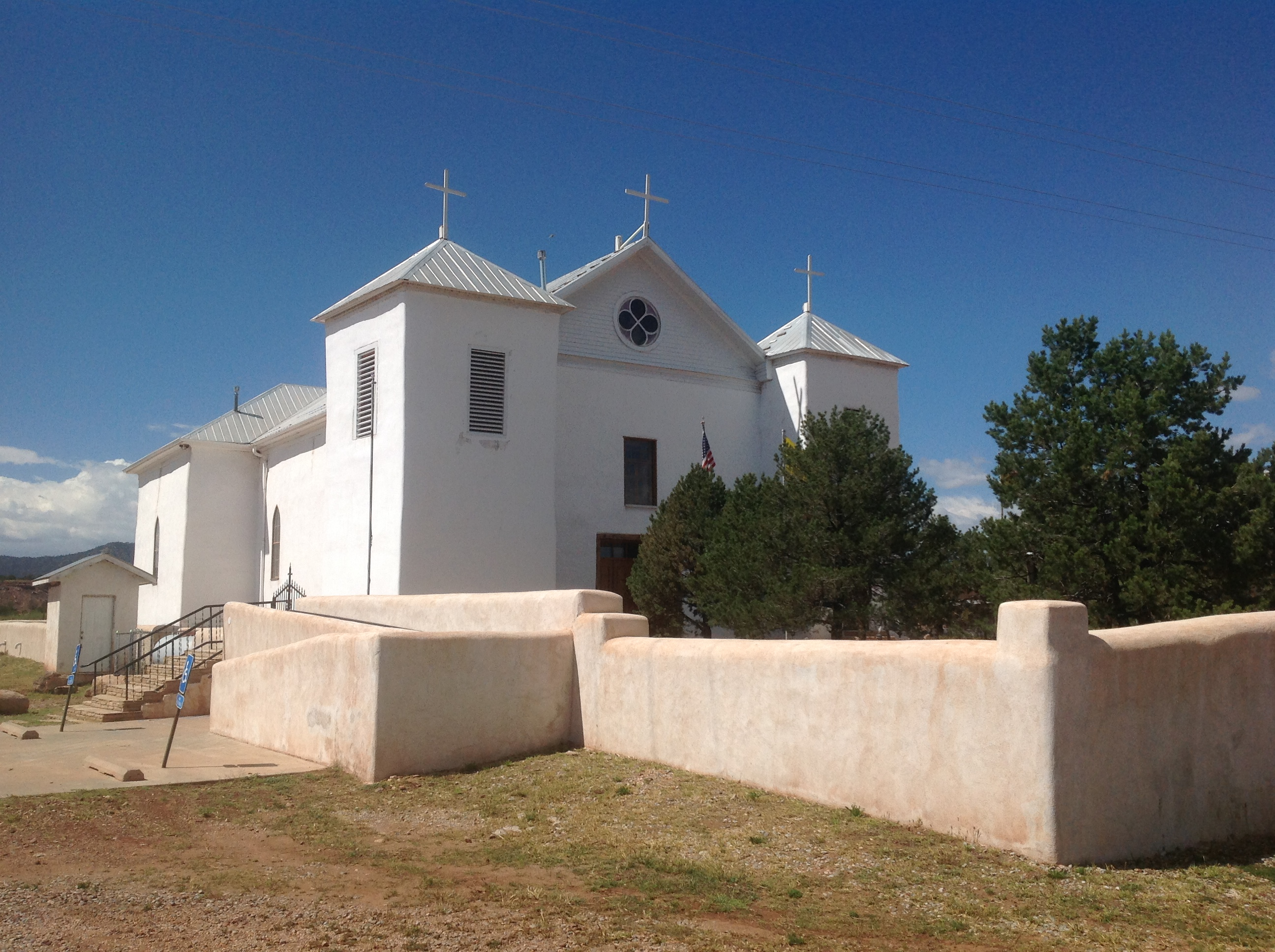
- The church in San Miguel del Vado

- Location in the United States
- Coordinates: 35.364°N 105.451°W
- Country: United States
- State: New Mexico
- County: San Miguel
- Elevation: 6,024 ft (1,836 m)
- Time zone: UTC-7 (Mountain (MST))
  - Summer (DST): UTC-6 (MDT)

San Miguel del Vado (Spanish pronunciation: [ˈsam miˈɣel del ˈβaðo]; also spelled Bado) is an unincorporated community in San Miguel County, New Mexico, United States.

== Description ==
The community is located about 2 kilometres (1.2 mi) south of Interstate Highway 25 and Ribera, a census-designated place. The namesake of the San Miguel del Vado Land Grant, San Miguel was an important community of Hispanics, especially genizaros, in the 19th century. The Santa Fe Trail passed through San Miguel. The community is located on the west bank of the Pecos River along New Mexico State Road 3. San Miguel del Vado was listed on the National Register of Historic Places in 1972. The name of the community means "Saint Michael of the Ford".

== Early history ==
San Miguel del Vado is about 35 kilometres (22 mi) downstream from the Pecos Pueblo, the easternmost settlement of the Pueblo Indians in the 16th century when Spanish explorers first visited the area. Spanish settlements in New Mexico, dating from as early as 1598, were located near the Rio Grande. Spanish expansion was hindered by constant warfare with the surrounding Comanche, Apache, Navajo, and Ute Indians. In the 1780s the Spanish made peace with the Comanche, who thereafter aided them against the Apache, reducing, but not eliminating, the threat to the Spanish settlements and making it possible for the Spanish to expand eastward toward the Great Plains.

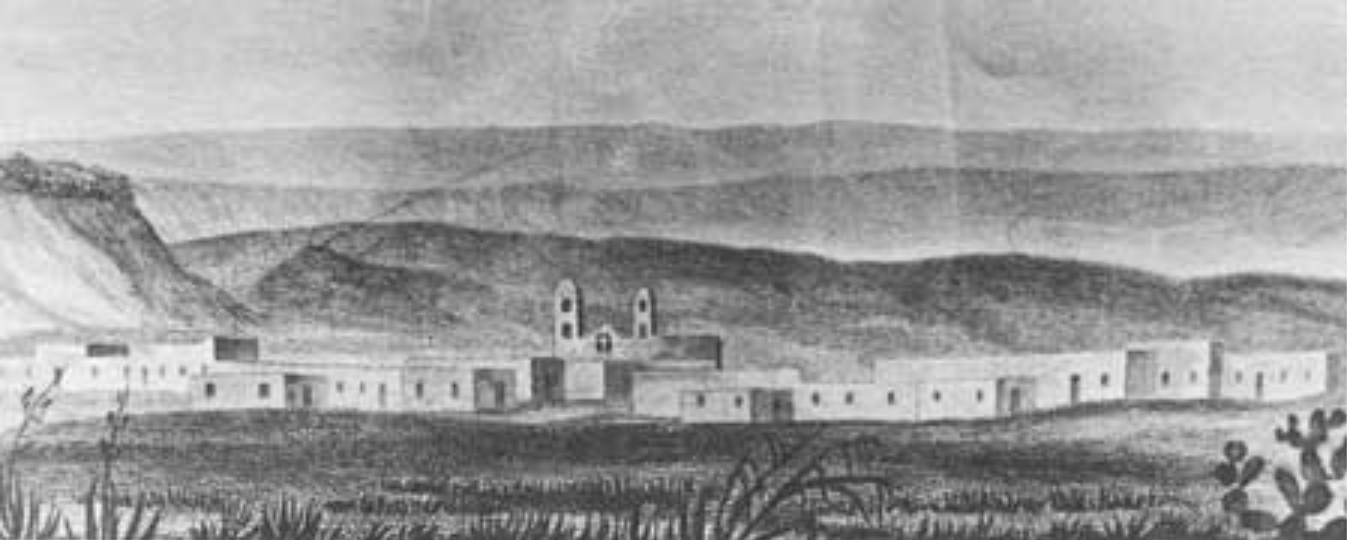
San Miguel del Vado in 1846

In 1794, 52 families led by Lorenzo Marquez petitioned the Spanish government of New Mexico for permission to settle in what would become the San Miguel del Vado area. Thirteen of the petitioners were described as "Indians," probably from the Pecos Pueblo which was declining in population and influence. Most of the remainder were genizaros (Hispanized and Christian Indians of Comanche and other origins) and mestizos. The petitioners possessed 25 firearms and promised that every man would become armed and they would construct a fortified plaza to defend themselves. The San Miguel del Vado Land Grant consisted of 315,000 acres (127,000 ha).

In 1803, the Spanish government divided the irrigated agricultural land of the grant into allotments for each of the 58 families then living in San Miguel del Vado. Pastures and watering places were held in common. Additional allotments of land was made to 45 men and two women at San Jose del Vado 6 kilometres (3.7 miles) upstream from San Miguel. In 1805, a Roman Catholic church was constructed. In 1812, about 230 families lived in San Miguel and San Jose del Vado and in other nearby settlements along the Pecos River. San Miguel was the political and military center of the Spanish settlements east of the Rocky Mountains in the Pecos River valley.

A census in 1827 counted 2,893 people living in San Miguel and other communities in the Pecos River valley. Occupations of the men enumerated in the census were 401 farmers, 217 day laborers, 93 craftsmen, 2 merchants, and 1 school teacher. The village itself probably had a population of 400 to 500 people. Crops produced on the irrigated lands near the Pecos River included "corn, beans, wheat, chiles, tobacco, peaches, and apricots." Sheep and goats were the most important livestock, grazed mostly on common lands of the land grant. Much of the livelihood of the people of San Miguel derived from trade, often illicit, with the Comanches and other Plains Indians.

Spanish authorities did not fully trust the loyalty of the residents of San Miguel. In 1805 several men in San Miguel were arrested for defying regulations for trade with the Plains Indians. However, in 1808, concern about the encroachments of Americans on the Great Plains and fear of renewed war with the Comanche led the Spanish to organize a force of genízaros to patrol the plains and gain intelligence about both the Plains Indians and the Americans. The comancheros (traders) and ciboleros (bison hunters) of 19th century fame were mostly men from the settlements in the Pecos River Valley.

== The American era ==
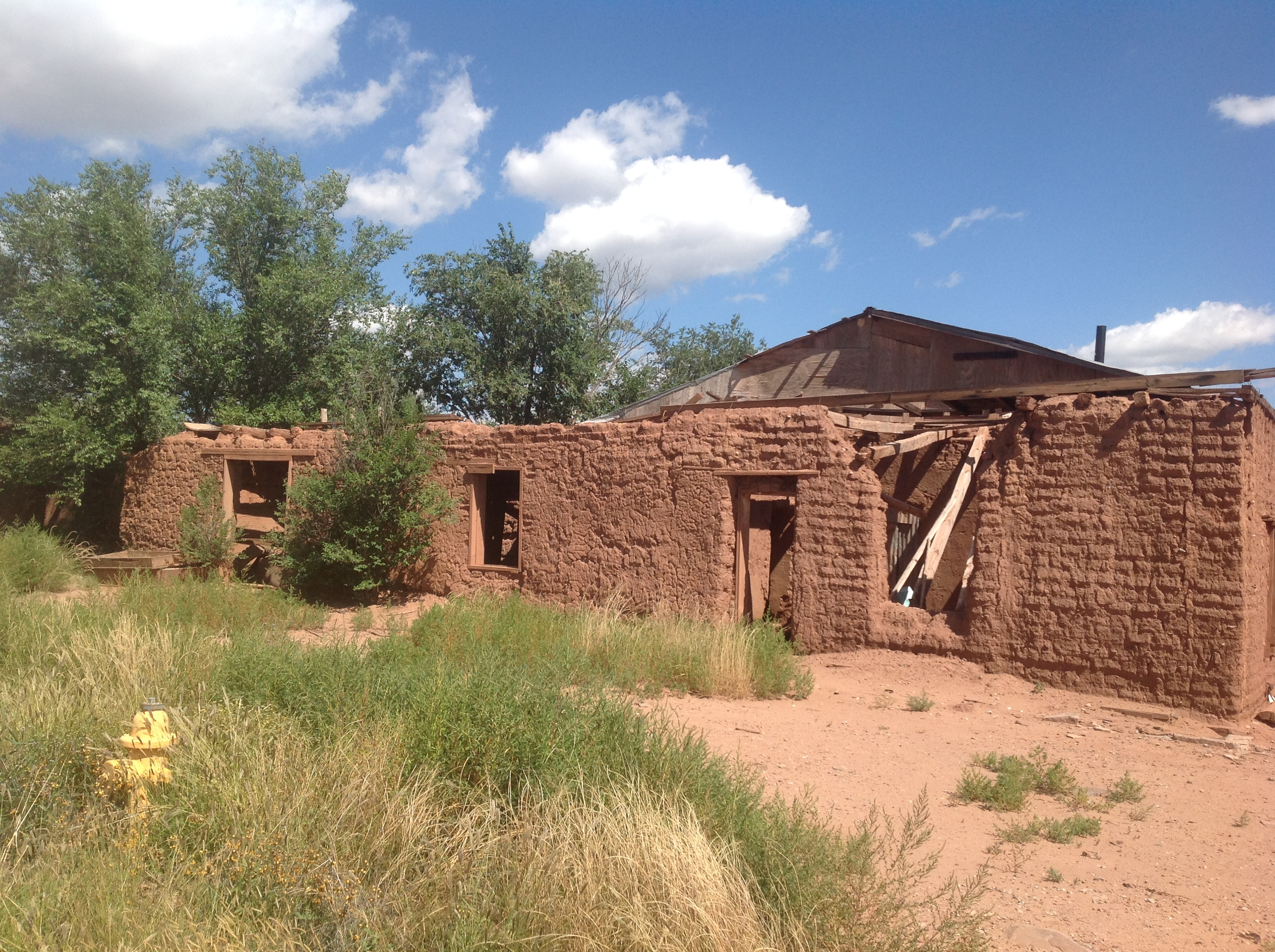
Abandoned adobe in San Miguel

San Miguel del Vado was most prominent during the era of the Santa Fe Trail (1821–1880). The town was located along the trail near a ford across the Pecos River. William Becknell led the first trading expedition from Independence, Missouri to Santa Fe, New Mexico in 1821, stopping in San Miguel before continuing on to Santa Fe. Thereafter, traffic on the Santa Fe Trail between the U.S. and Mexico was extensive. Residents of San Miguel sold food and supplies to American traders, worked with the Americans as guides and wagoners, and extracted bribes and levied tariffs on American products, mostly textiles. An American, William Rowland, married a local woman and opened a store in San Miguel in 1838. In 1841, several Texans captured during the Texan Santa Fe Expedition were held prisoner temporarily in San Miguel. On August 16, 1846, during the Mexican–American War, U.S. General Stephen W. Kearney and his soldiers occupied San Miguel and thereafter the village was under United States control.

San Miguel del Vado declined in importance after 1860 when the government of San Miguel County was moved to Las Vegas. In 1881, the railroad bypassed the village in favor of a route through Ribera. In 1897, the U.S. Supreme Court of the United States reduced the size of the San Miguel del Vado Land Grant from 315,000 acres (127,000 ha) to 5,000 acres (2,000 ha) thereby depriving the residents of San Miguel and other communities of common ownership of the "pasture, timber and other resources" within the grant area.
