= Alberto Maynez =

59th Spanish governor of New Mexico
- In office 1807–1808
- Preceded by: Joaquín del Real Alencaster
- Succeeded by: José Manrique

61st Spanish governor of New Mexico
- In office 1814–1816
- Preceded by: José Manrique
- Succeeded by: Pedro María de Allande

Personal details
- Born: unknown unknown
- Died: unknown unknown
- Profession: Governor of New Mexico

Alberto Maynez was a lieutenant colonel who served as Governor of Santa Fe de Nuevo México between 1807 and 1808 and between 1814 and 1816.

== Career ==
Maynez joined the Spanish Army in his youth, eventually rising to the rank of lieutenant colonel.

In 1807, Maynez was appointed as Governor of Santa Fe de Nuevo México. During his administration in New Mexico, he allowed the Neomexicanos to trade with pagans and the province of Nueva Vizcaya. This meant the merchants had to have only a government approval and passports to trade with them (the passports were required to confirm that the number of armed men in the transactions was enough). In 1808, he was replaced by José Manrique.

In 1815 he was appointed acting governor of Santa Fe de Nuevo México and city councilman in Santa Fe. In addition, he served as protector of the Native Americans who lived in the province (at this time New Mexico, according to the Cadiz Constitution, was a province of Spain). During his administration, the settlers in the Pecos River continued hunting and trading with the Comanche people, establishing good relations with them. This occurred regardless of government approval.

In 1816, the chief of the Taos Pueblo sued the many settlers who had just settled in San Fernando de Taos and Arroyo Hondo, near San Fernando. However, the mayor of Taos, Pedro Martinez, and the friar of the Taos Mission, Jose Benito Pereyro, opposed the suit, pointing out that lands that were not cultivated by Native Americans (including Arroyo Hondo's lands) should belong to the Criollos, because they were descendants of Spaniards, who had conquered New Mexico. Either way, Maynez ordered the settlers of San Fernando de Taos to abandon the lands which were property of the Pueblo Native Americans. In October 1815, Maynez issued a law that defended the Indigenous rights of New Mexico.

In 1816, during the final year of his government in New Mexico, 280 Spanish colonists of Taos made a revolt to reverse the new 5% tax (which had been set by Pedro Martin, the Alcalde mayor of Taos) and were imprisoned. The complaint was delivered to Maynez, who represented them. After Maynez imposed the removal of that tax, Alcalde Mayor Pedro Martin resigned from his charge.

Maynez ended his term in New Mexico in 1816, being replaced by Pedro María de Allande in the province government.
