= San Jose, San Miguel County, New Mexico =

San Jose, New Mexico
- Census-designated place
- Location within New Mexico
- Coordinates: 35°23′44″N 105°28′33″W
- Country: United States
- State: New Mexico
- County: San Miguel

Area
  - Total: 0.265 sq mi (0.69 km^{2})
  - Land: 0.265 sq mi (0.69 km^{2})
  - Water: 0 sq mi (0 km^{2})
- Elevation: 6,135 ft (1,870 m)

Population (2010)
  - Total: 137
  - Density: 517/sq mi (200/km^{2})
- Time zone: UTC-7 (Mountain (MST))
  - Summer (DST): UTC-6 (MDT)
- ZIP code: 87565
- Area code: 505
- GNIS feature ID: 2629125

San Jose is a census-designated place in San Miguel County, New Mexico, United States. Its population was 137 as of the 2010 census. San Jose has a post office, with ZIP code 87565. Exit 319 of Interstate 25 serves the community.

== History ==
San Jose was founded in 1803 when allotments of land were made to 45 men and two women by the Spanish government of New Mexico. The purpose of the settlement, and others in the Pecos River valley, was to defend the eastern flanks of the New Mexican settlements from Indian attacks, especially by the Apaches. Many of the early settlers were landless genizaros. Many of the comancheros and ciboleros who traded with the Comanche and hunted bison on the Great Plains came from San Jose and other Pecos Valley settlements.

== Geography ==
According to the U.S. Census Bureau, the community has an area of 0.265 square miles (0.69 km^{2}), all land.

== Education ==
It is in the West Las Vegas Schools school district. West Las Vegas High School is the area high school.

== See also ==
- San Miguel del Vado
- San Miguel del Vado Land Grant
