= Juan Bautista de Anza =

18th-century Basque explorer and governor within the Spanish Empire

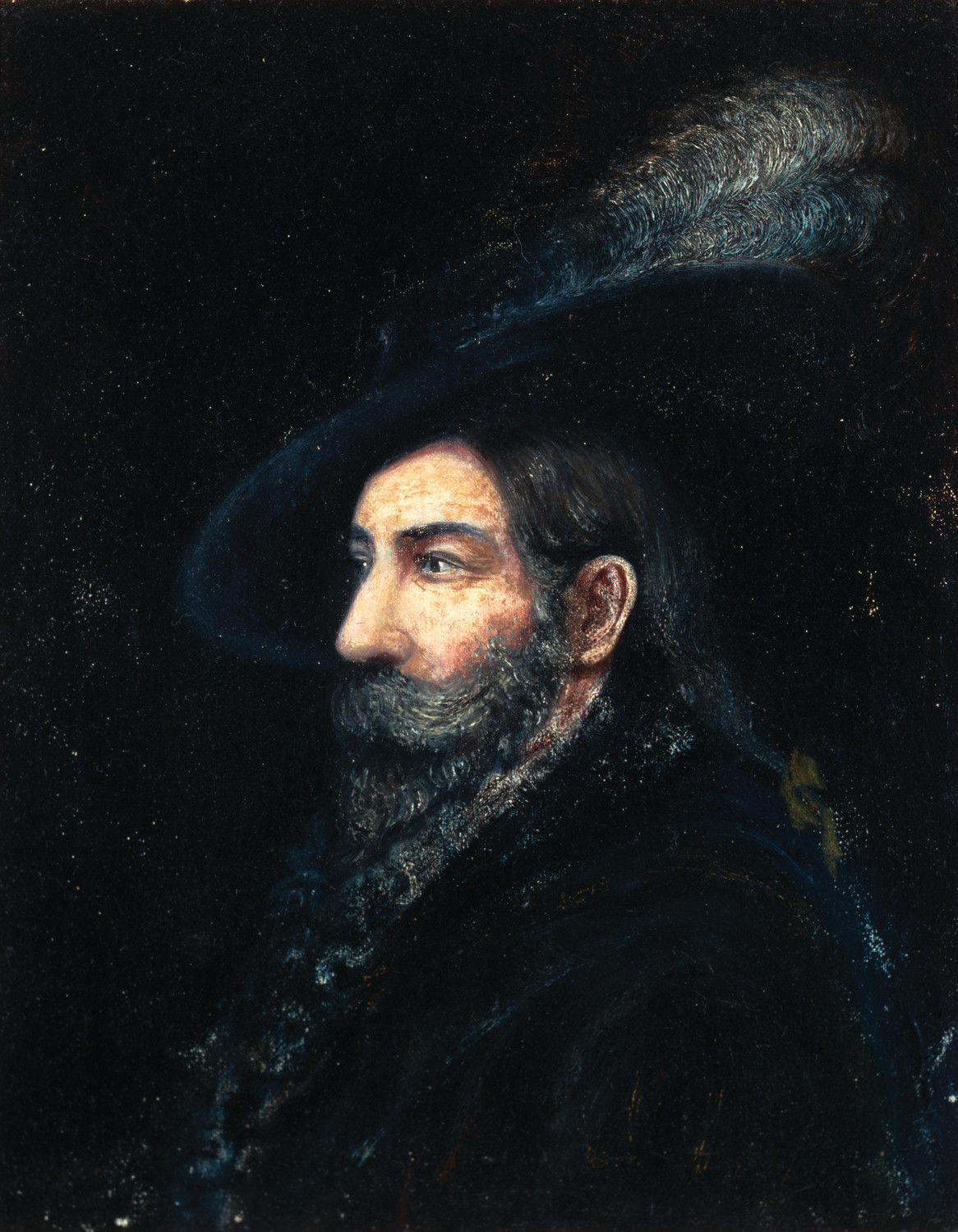
- Portrait by Fray Orcí, 1774

55th Governor of Province of New Mexico
- In office 1778–1788
- Preceded by: Francisco Trevre
- Succeeded by: Fernando de la Concha

Personal details
- Born: Juan Bautista de Anza Bezerra Nieto; July 6 or 7, 1736 Fronteras, New Navarre, New Spain (now Sonora, Mexico)
- Died: December 19, 1788 (aged 52) Arizpe, New Navarre, New Spain
- Profession: Explorer and Governor of New Mexico
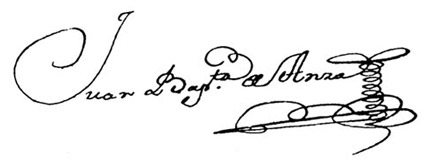
- Signature

Juan Bautista de Anza Bezerra (July 6 or 7, 1736 – December 19, 1788) known more simply as "Juan Bautista de Anza" was a Spanish expeditionary leader, military officer, and politician primarily in California and New Mexico under the Spanish Empire. He is credited as one of the founding fathers of Spanish California and served as an official within New Spain as Governor of the province of New Mexico. Later, as governor of the Spanish colony of Santa Fe de Nuevo México, he put an end to the wars with the Comanche, overseeing the peace treaty of 1786.

== Early life ==
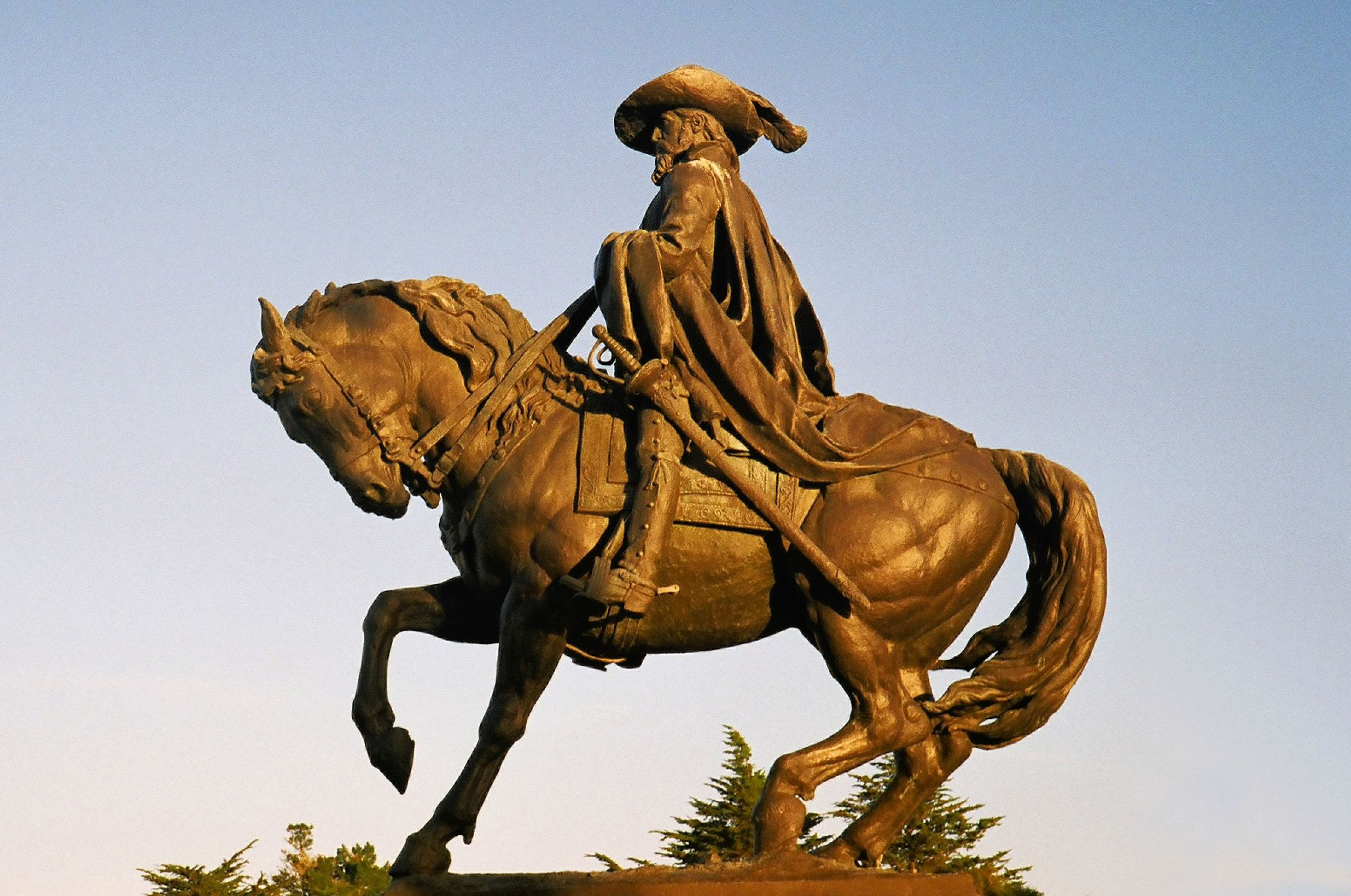
Equestrian statue of Anza at Lake Merced, San Francisco, California

de Anza was born in Fronteras, New Navarre, New Spain (today Sonora, Mexico) in 1736 (near Arizpe), most probably at Cuquiarachi, Sonora, but possibly at the Presidio of Fronteras. His father was Juan Baptista Anssa Sassoetta, and his mother Dona Maria Rafaela Bezerra Nieto ("Nieto" was her paternal grandmother's maiden name and was dropped from her children's names). After Anssa moved to the New World, "Baptista" became "Bautista" and his paternal surname "Anssa" morphed into "de Anza," simplified to "Anza" in the United States.

His family was a part of the military leadership in New Spain (Nueva España), as his father and maternal grandfather, Captain Antonio Bezerra Nieto, had both served Spain, their families living on the frontier of Nueva Navarra. It is traditionally thought that he may have been educated at the College of San Ildefonso in Mexico City, and later at the military academy there. In 1752 he enlisted in the army at the Presidio of Fronteras. He advanced rapidly and had become a captain by 1760. He married in 1761. His wife was Ana María Pérez Serrano (b. January 1744/45, d. date unknown), the daughter of Spanish mine owner Francisco Pérez Serrano. They had no children. His military duties mainly consisted of hostile forays against Native Americans, such as the Apache, during the course of which he explored much of what is now Arizona.

== California expeditions ==
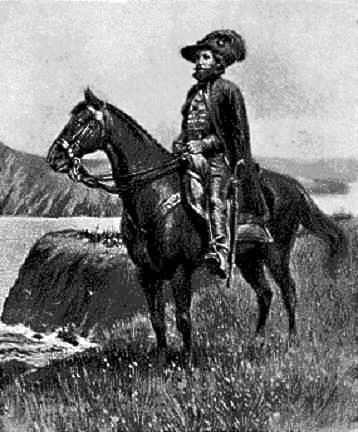
Juan Bautista de Anza, from a portrait in oil by Fray Orsi in 1774

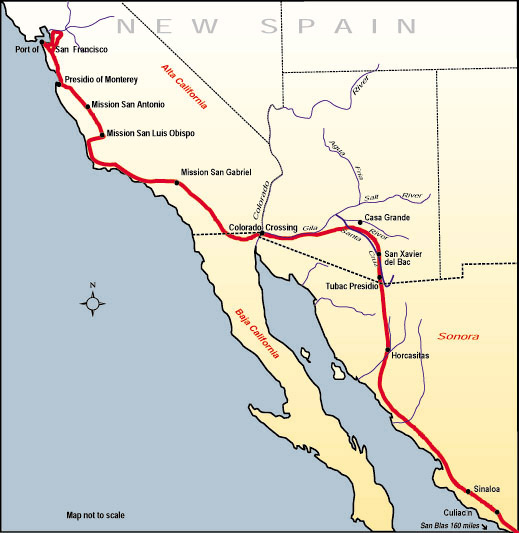
Map of the route that Juan Bautista de Anza traveled in 1775–76 from Mexico to today's San Francisco

The Spanish began colonizing Alta California with the Portolá expedition of 1769–1770. The two-pronged Portolá effort involved both a long sea voyage against prevailing winds and the California Current, and a difficult land route from Baja California. Colonies were established at San Diego and Monterey, with a presidio and Franciscan mission at each location. A more direct land route and further colonization were desired, especially at present-day San Francisco, which Portolá saw but was not able to colonize. By the time of de Anza's expedition, three more missions had been established, including Mission San Antonio de Padua west of the Salinas Valley.

In 1772, de Anza proposed an expedition to Alta California to the Viceroy of New Spain. This was approved by the King of Spain and on January 8, 1774, with 3 padres, 20 soldiers, 11 servants, 35 mules, 65 cattle, and 140 horses, Anza set forth from Tubac Presidio, south of present-day Tucson, Arizona. de Anza heard of a California Native American called Sebastian Tarabal who had fled from Mission San Gabriel to Sonora, and took him as guide. The expedition took a southern route along the Rio Altar (Sonora y Sinaloa, New Spain), then paralleled the present-day Mexico–California border, crossing the Colorado River at its confluence with the Gila River. This was in the domain of the Yuma tribe, with which he established good relations.

de Anza reached Mission San Gabriel Arcángel, near the California coast, on March 22, 1774, and Monterey, California, Alta California's future capital (Alta California split from Las Californias 1804, creating Baja and Alta), on April 19. He returned to Tubac by late May 1774. This expedition was closely watched by Viceroy and King, and on October 2, 1774, de Anza was promoted to the rank of lieutenant-colonel, and ordered to lead a group of colonists to Alta California. The Spanish were desirous of reinforcing their presence in Alta California as a buffer against Russian colonization of the Americas advancing from the north, and possibly establish a harbor that would give shelter to Spanish ships. The expedition got under way on October 23, 1775, and arrived at Mission San Gabriel Arcángel in January 1776, the colonists having suffered greatly from the winter weather en route.

The expedition continued on to Monterey with the colonists. Having fulfilled his mission from the Viceroy, he continued north with the priest Pedro Font and a party of twelve others, following an inland route to the San Francisco Bay established in 1770 by Pedro Fages. On the way, he led a raid on Apache settlements near Presidio San Ignacio de Tubac, capturing forty Apaches. The soldiers divided the captives among them as slaves; de Anza kept the fifteen female captives and their newborns as his share.

In de Anza's diary on March 25, 1776, he states that he "arrived at the arroyo of San Joseph Cupertino (now Stevens Creek), which is useful only for travelers. Here we halted for the night, having come eight leagues in seven and a half hours. From this place we have seen at our right the estuary which runs from the port of San Francisco." Pressing on, Bautista de Anza located the sites for the Presidio of San Francisco and Mission San Francisco de Asis in present-day San Francisco, California on March 28, 1776. He did not establish the settlement; it was established later by José Joaquín Moraga. While returning to Monterey, he located the original sites for Mission Santa Clara de Asis and the town of San José de Guadalupe (present-day San Jose, California), but again did not establish either settlement. Today this route is marked as the Juan Bautista de Anza National Historic Trail.

Despite de Anza's successes, Spanish ambitions to establish a permanent overland route from Sonora to Alta California were thwarted in 1781, when a revolt of the Yumas tribe closed the trail at the Yuma Crossing of the Colorado River. The route was not reopened until the late 1820s, and the only regular travel to Alta California during the intervening years was by sea.

== Governor of New Mexico ==
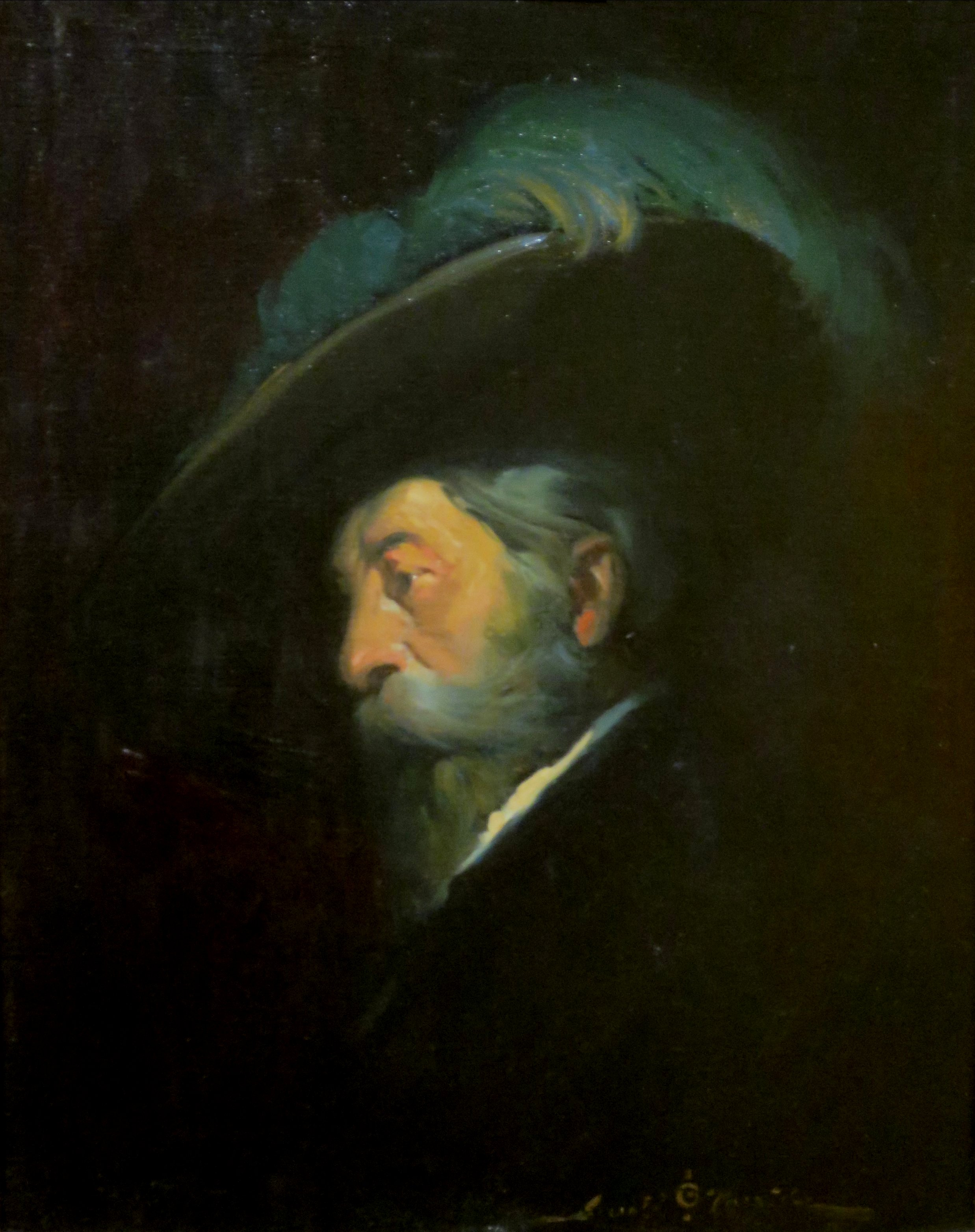
Portrait by Gerald Cassidy

On his return from this successful expedition in 1777 he journeyed to Mexico City with the chief of the lower Colorado River area Quechan (Yuma) Native American tribe who requested the establishment of a mission. On August 24, 1777, the Viceroy of New Spain appointed Anza as the Governor of the Province of Nuevo México, which evolved into the present-day U.S. state of New Mexico.

Governor de Anza led a punitive expedition against the Comanche group of Native Americans, who had been repeatedly raiding Taos during 1779. With his Ute and Apache Native American allies, and around 800 Spanish soldiers, de Anza went north through the San Luis Valley, entering the Great Plains at what is now Manitou Springs, Colorado. Circling "El Capitan" (current day Pikes Peak), he surprised a small force of the Comanche near present-day Colorado Springs. Pursuing them south down Fountain Creek, he crossed the Arkansas River near present-day Pueblo, Colorado. He found the main body of the Comanche on Greenhorn Creek, returning from a raid in Nuevo México, and won a decisive victory. Chief Cuerno Verde, for whom Greenhorn Creek is named, and many other leaders of the Comanche were killed.

In late 1779, de Anza and his party found a route from Santa Fe to Sonora, west of the El Camino Real de Tierra Adentro. His various local military expeditions against tribes defending their homelands were often successful, but the Quechan (Yuma) Native American tribe which he had established peace with earlier rebelled, and he fell out of favor with the military commander of the Northern Frontier, the frontier-general. In 1783 de Anza led a campaign against the Comanche on the eastern plains and by 1784 they were suing for peace. The last of the Comanche chiefs eventually acceded and a formal treaty was concluded on 28 February 1786 at Pecos Pueblo. This paved the way for traders and the development of the Comanchero trade.

Juan Bautista de Anza remained as governor of Nuevo Mexico (New Mexico) until 1787 when he returned to Sonora. He was appointed commander of the Presidio of Tucson in 1788 but died before he could depart and take office. He was 52 years old. De Anza was survived by his wife.

Juan Bautista de Anza died in Arizpe, in what is now the State of Sonora, Mexico, and was buried in the Church of Nuestra Señora de la Asunción de Arizpe. In 1963, with the participation of delegations from the University of California, Berkeley and San Francisco, he was disinterred and reburied in a new marble memorial mausoleum at the same Church.

== Legacy ==
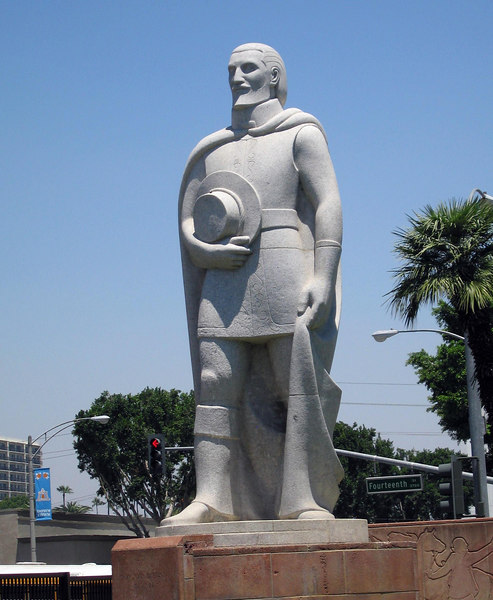
Statue by Dorr Bothwell in Riverside, California

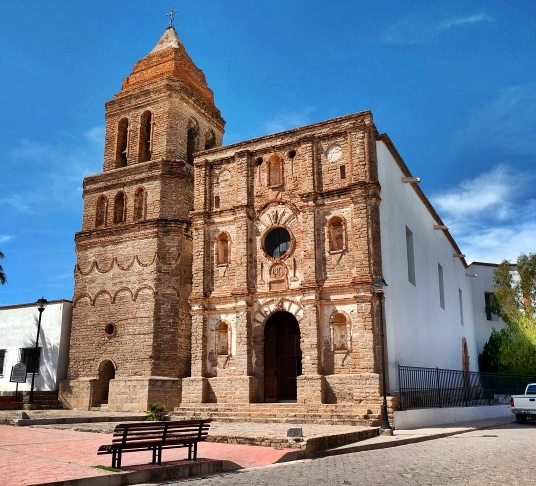
Juan Bautista de Anza's burial site in Arizpe, Sonora

The primary legacy is the Juan Bautista de Anza National Historic Trail in California and Arizona, administered by the US National Park Service, for hiking and driving the route of his expedition exploring Las Californias In the San Fernando Valley the trail crosses the Upper Las Virgenes Canyon Open Space Preserve, and in the San Gabriel Valley the trail is in the Puente Hills just north of Whittier, California.

Also named for de Anza is Anza-Borrego Desert State Park, located mostly in eastern San Diego County, California. The park contains a long and difficult stretch of the Anza trail, traveling west from the Imperial Valley to the coastal mountain passes northeast of San Diego. The de Anza Country Club and its 18-hole championship Golf course is located within the village of Borrego Springs, California, which is entirely surrounded by the park.

A building named the Juan de Anza House in San Juan Bautista, California is a National Historic Landmark. However, it was constructed c. 1830 with its connection unclear. The Juan Bautista de Anza Community Park is in Calabasas, California, and De Anza Park and the De Anza Community and Teen Center are in Ontario, California.

A 20-foot (6.1 m) statue of Anza, sculpted in 1939, is located in Riverside, California at the corner of Magnolia Ave. and 14th Street, and another statue stands in Lake Merced park, San Francisco. A 10-foot-high (3 m) portrait of de Anza by Albert Herter in 1929 hangs in the History Room of the Los Angeles Central Library.

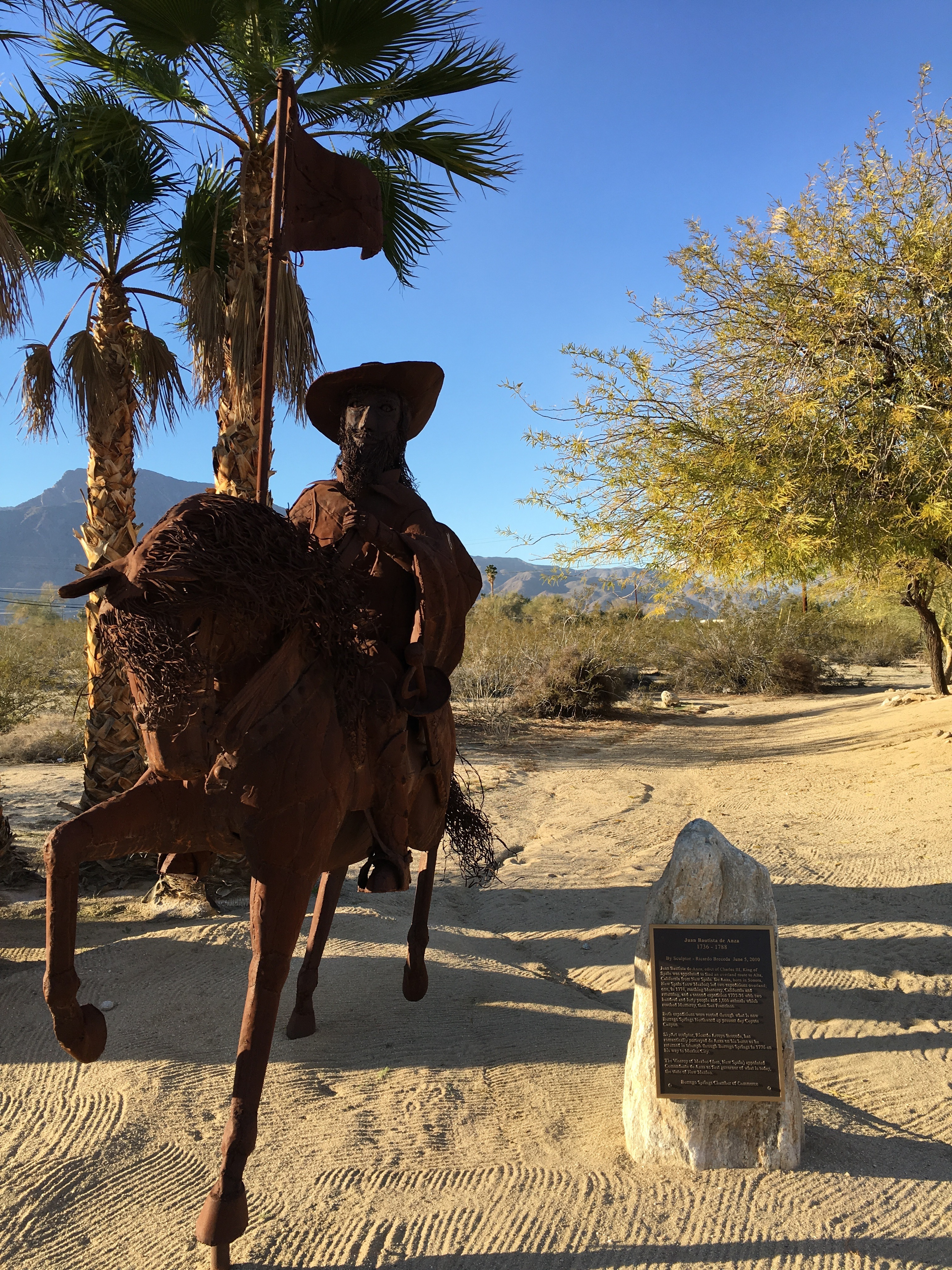
Statue of Juan Bautista de Anza at Anza-Borrego Desert State Park.

The de Anza and De Anza spellings are also the namesake of streets, schools, and buildings in his honor including: De Anza Boulevards in San Mateo and Cupertino, De Anza Park in Sunnyvale, De Anza College in Cupertino, De Anza High School in Richmond, Juan Bautista De Anza elementary school in San Jacinto, Juan De Anza K-5 in the Wiseburn Elementary School District of Hawthorne, De Anza Middle School in Ontario, De Anza Middle School in Ventura, De Anza Elementary School in El Centro, and the De Anza School in Baldwin Park, the landmark De Anza Hotel in San Jose, and the historic De Anza Hotel in Calexico—all in California. Also named in his honor is Juan Bautista Circle in the Parkmerced development in San Francisco.

Other places using just the name Anza in his honor include: Anza Vista Avenue within the Anza Vista neighborhood of San Francisco, Anza Street in that city's Richmond District, Lake Anza in Tilden Regional Park above Berkeley in the Berkeley Hills, Anza Avenue and Anza Elementary School in Torrance, and De Anza Way in Palm Desert.

The town of Anza, California is a mountainous town with around 7,000 people in Riverside County along State Route 371 between Aguanga and the Santa Rosa Mountains south of Palm Springs. The town is located on the historic route of de Anza's 1774 expedition.

== Footnotes ==
Preceded by Francisco Trevre acting	Governor of New Mexico; 1778–1788	Succeeded by Fernando de la Concha
