= Joaquín del Real Alencaster =

Spanish politician

58th Spanish Governor of New Mexico
- In office 1804–1807
- Preceded by: Fernando Chacón
- Succeeded by: Alberto Maynez

Personal details
- Born: Around 1761 Cádiz, Andalusia, Spain
- Profession: Soldier and Captain General and Governor of New Mexico
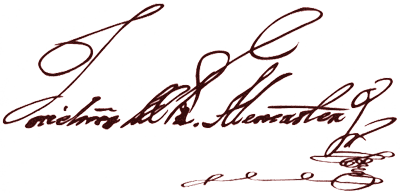
- Signature

Joaquín del Real Alencaster (born around 1761) was a Spanish soldier who served as the governor of New Mexico between 1804 and 1807. During his administration, he limited the products that New Mexicans could trade, leading to a revolt against his measures.

== Biography ==
=== Early years ===
Real Alencaster was born in Cádiz, Andalusia, Spain, but was raised in Algeciras, where he lived from the age of one. The son of Antonio del Real and María Antonia Alencaster, he also had a brother, Antonio. He joined the Spanish army as a cadet on 5 January 1773, obtaining the Sub-lieutenant rank on 5 January 1780. Seven years later, on 16 September 1787, he reached the rank of lieutenant. Later, on 5 October 1790, he was appointed "ayudante mayor" and, on 23 April 1794, got the rank of Captain. On 4 September he was promoted to Teniente Coronel (lieutenant colonel). He was member of the Regimiento de Zaragoza and the "Segunda Batallón de Infantería Ligera de Voluntarios de Aragón" (Light Infantry Battalion of Volunteers of Aragon). In addition, he also formed part of the team of expedition to Algiers on 8 July 1775 and participated in the siege of Oran between 8 June and 30 July 1791, among others.

In New Spain, Alencaster was a member of the garrison stationed at the Presidio of Santa Fe.

=== Government of New Mexico ===
Alencaster was named governor of Santa Fe de New Mexico in 1804 and embarked with his brother from Cádiz to Veracruz on 2 June 1804. Once there, Alencaster traveled to New Mexico and began his administration in the province in 1805.

During his term as governor, he donated money to restore the church of Santa Fé, and the citizens of New Mexico soon followed his example. The donations financed the construction of a new floor and several new doors (one central and two lateral).

In addition, Alencaster regulated ecclesiastical life: all the priests in charge of various missions had to give mass in the two churches of the province. This was because New Mexico had seen the number of priests operating there reduced, as it was missing five of them. and Mass was not being given everywhere.

Because he needed to study the relationships of couples who wanted to marry, Alencaster requested the Bishop the obtaining of "dispensations to prohibited relationships". On the other hand, Alencaster raised taxes and suppressed the smuggling of contraband.

The most important fact happened during his administration was a crisis of civil disobedience which he managed to defuse. Traders and explorers coming from the United States (Eastern states of modern United States) were seen in Santa Fe at the same time the Nuevomexicanos and the Plains Indians, especially the Comanche people, were trading. Alencaster established measures to try to curb this trade. He only allowed the commercialization of a series of products by the Nuevomexicanos at the Chihuahua City fair, which was celebrated each year. In addition, Alencaster cancelled the sale of grain from Río Arriba (although the cereal constituted basic food supply for the presidio of Santa Fe), as well as sheep to the Navajo people. However, Miguel de Sandoval opposed the measures of Alencater and promoted the maintenance of traditional trade with the Comanches. The support to the Sandoval ideas by the inhabitants of the province caused a revolt against the Alencaster measurements.

In midsummer of 1806, Real Alencaster organized an expedition to look for the Lewis and Clark explorers and capture them. About five hundred soldiers under Lieutenant Facundo Melgares were sent to the Missouri River. After six months of travel, Melgares reached the Missouri River, but never found Lewis and Clark.

He was replaced as governor of New Mexico by Alberto Maynez in 1807.
