= Cibolero =

A Cibolero (plural: ciboleros) was a Spanish colonial (and later Mexican) buffalo hunter from New Mexico. The Spanish word for buffalo as used in New Mexico is cibolo; hence, the name Cibolero for buffalo hunter.

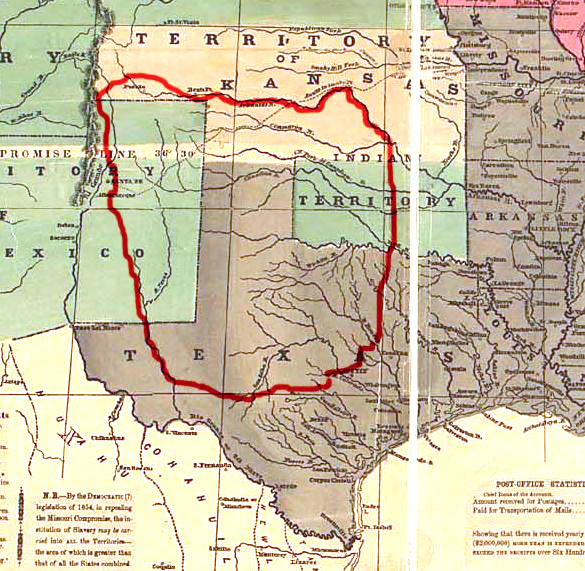
Comancheria, the Cibolero hunting range

== Activities ==
Ciboleros hunted the American bison, or buffalo, on the Great Plains of what is now eastern New Mexico and Texas, mostly in the areas of the Llano Estacado and Comancheria. Their domain ranged as far east and north as Nebraska. The Ciboleros typically hunted buffalo in late fall once the summer crops had been harvested. Many Ciboleros from New Mexico lived along or near the Pecos River from the villages of San José, San Miguel del Vado, and Tecolote and south toward La Cuesta (now the town of Villanueva, New Mexico). The Ciboleros were primarily hunters, and the contemporaneous comanchero were mostly traders with the Comanche and other Plains Indians, but the two activities overlapped.

== History ==
Josiah Gregg gave this description of a Cibolero whom he encountered:

As we were proceeding on our march, we observed a horseman approaching, who excited at first considerable curiosity. His picturesque costume, and peculiarity of deportment, however, soon showed him to be a Mexican Cibolero or buffalo-hunter.

John Miller Morris explained the historical significance of the Ciboleros:

Juan de Oñate's colonists and the later settlers had introduced domesticated horses, cattle, pack animals, crops, fruits, goats and sheep into New Mexico, beginning a significant transculturation process for regional food supplies and transportation. The natives of the bison plains, for example, quickly exchanged information with the frontier Hispanos about the sport of buffalo hunting. This process developed one of the most symbolic of the 18th- and 19th-century frontiersman in the Southwest: the thrilling, sportive, distinctive Cibolero of the eastern bison plains. The Llano served as the chief acculturation point for many Ciboleros, a point where ideas, words, goods, and practices flowed between east and west. The Cibolero also facilitated the survival of whole populations, augmenting the ancient flow of bison meat from plain to valley, gradually supplanting and transforming the many hundreds of former native traders.

The Cibolero way of life ended by the late 1870s, with the destruction of the American bison. Ciboleros are still remembered in New Mexican folk songs, cultural events, and family oral traditions.

== Fictional ==
Ciboleros are an integral part of some works of fiction dealing with the American Southwest and West. For example, José's Buffalo Hunt: A Story from History recounts a cibolero buffalo hunt around 1866. The novel Cibolero, set against the backdrop of Spanish to Mexican rule, includes descriptions of early-19th-century buffalo hunts.

== See also ==
- Comanchero
