= Comanchero =

Group of historical traders in New Mexico

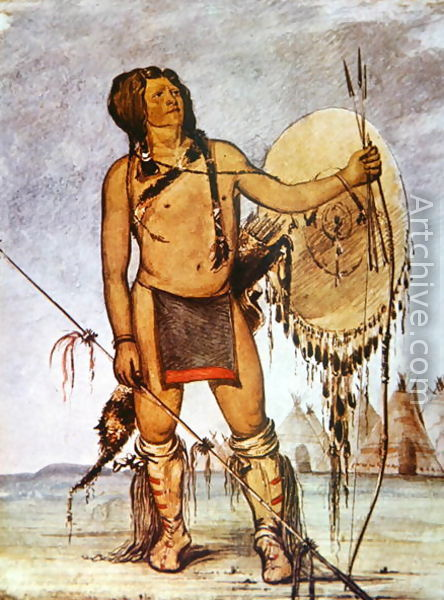
Painting of a Comanche Indian by George Catlin, 1835

The Comancheros were a group of 18th- and 19th-century traders, either European settlers or Mexicans, based in northern and central New Mexico. They made their living by trading with the nomadic Great Plains Indian tribes in northeastern New Mexico, West Texas, and other parts of the southern plains of North America. The name "Comancheros" comes from the Comanche tribe, in whose territory they traded. They traded manufactured goods (tools and cloth), flour, tobacco, and bread for hides, livestock, and slaves from the Comanche. As the Comancheros did not have regular access to weapons and gunpowder, disagreement exists about how much they traded these with the Comanche.

== History ==
Prior to the coming of the Spanish, with their horses, into the American Southwest, with early explorations beginning in the 1540s and permanent settlement in the late 1590s, the people who came to be known as Comanches did not live in the Southern High Plains. The Comanches, a Shoshonean people, migrated from the north and arose as a separate and distinct tribe in the early 18th century, largely as a result of having obtained breeding stocks of horses after the Pueblo Revolt of 1680. They migrated southward, through the Rocky Mountains and into the Southern High Plains, where their Shoshonean kinsmen, the Utes, and they began to appear at trade fairs in Taos, around 1700. During the first half of the 18th century, the Comanche gradually spread their area of occupation throughout the Southern High Plains and large areas of Texas, where they largely displaced the tribal peoples who had lived there prior to the coming of the Spaniards, mostly the Apache, who were themselves an earlier migrant group of Athabaskan peoples from the north.

In 1719, the Comanches made the first recorded raid for horses upon the settlements of the Rio Grande Valley. For the next 60 years, the relations of the Comanches with the Spanish and Pueblo settlements were a patchwork of alternate trading and raiding, with different bands being sometimes at peace and sometimes at war with the settlements along the Rio Grande. During the mid-18th century (1750–1780), the plains tribes, notably the Comanche, but also the Apache and other tribal groups, raided the Pueblos and Spanish settlements for horses, corn, and slaves with ever-increasing frequency. This continued until 1779, when a 500-man army led directly by the new, young governor, Juan Bautista de Anza, and including 200 native auxiliaries, undertook a punitive expedition against the largest and most active group of Comanche raiders, who were led by a man known as Green Horn (Cuerno Verde), and surprising the Comanches in their camp, killed Green Horn and dealt a severe defeat to the Comanches. This show of force resulted in various Comanche war leaders acceding to peace over the next several years. By the end of 1785, most or all of the Comanche bands had agreed. On 28 February 1786, at the Pecos Pueblo, a treaty between the Comanche and the Spanish in New Mexico was signed between Governor de Anza and Ecueracapa, a Comanche war chief who had been selected as a plenipotentiary for the Comanche nation.

This treaty opened the way for the full development of the Comanchero trade. Prior to this, New Mexico trade with the Comanche had been essentially limited to Comanche attendance at trade fairs at the Taos and Pecos Pueblos, and trade with the Spanish settlers at Santa Cruz, Santa Fe, Valencia, and Tome. Although undoubtedly intermittent trading occurred between small groups of Pueblos and Spaniards with various Comanche bands on the Southern High Plains prior to 1780, the real Comanchero trade grew and flourished after that year.

From the 1780s until the mid-19th century, the Comanchero trade flourished at different locales on the Southern High Plains, notably in northeastern New Mexico at Cejita de los Comancheros in present-day Harding County and in the Palo Duro Canyon area of Texas near Quitaque in present-day Briscoe County.

When the U.S. government commenced its war against the Comanches after the American Civil War, their Comanchero allies and relatives assisted the Comanche resistance by supplying firearms and ammunition to the tribes. The US Army's attempts to interdict this trade were relatively unsuccessful until the winter of 1874–1875, when US Army troops under General Ranald Mackenzie attacked and defeated five camps of Comanches in Palo Duro Canyon, burning the camps and capturing and destroying 1,400 horses. This defeat, and loss of their horses, camps, and food supplies, caused the last band of the free-roaming Comanches, the Kwahada under Quanah Parker, to surrender to reservation life at Ft. Sill, Oklahoma. This brought an end to the old Comanche and Comanchero trade relationship, which had existed for almost 100 years.

== Ethnicity ==
Josiah Gregg described these traders, "These parties of Comancheros are usually composed of the indigent and rude classes of the frontier villages, who collect together several times a year, and launch upon the plains with a few trinkets and trumperies of all kinds, and perhaps a bag of bread or pinole." Some historians and writers have referred to the Comancheros as Mexican traders. While traders from Mexico were occasionally involved with the Comanchero trade, by far the majority were from New Mexico, Hispanics and people of mixed ethnicity. New Mexicans of the time were the descendants of the Spanish colonial settlers and soldiers and the Native American peoples of New Mexico. The native peoples in New Mexico included the: Pueblo, Comanche, Apache, Kiowa, and Navajo. The Comancheros are distinguishable from the Ciboleros, the buffalo hunters from New Mexico. Both Comancheros and Ciboleros, however, were primarily Hispanics from New Mexico.

== Film and television roles ==
Comancheros feature as villains and outlaws in many classic Western films and television shows.

- The Gunsmoke TV series dealt with the subject of Comancheros in a two-part episode called "Women for Sale" (season 19, episodes one and two), which aired September 10 and 17, 1973. In this episode, James Whitmore guest-starred as leader of an Irish-born Comanchero trader. This episode also marked a Gunsmoke reunion for William Conrad, who narrated the episode's opening. Conrad had played the original Matt Dillon in the Gunsmoke radio series from 1952 to 1961.
- In "The Last Comanchero" (1958), an episode of the ABC/Warner Bros. series Cheyenne, character actor Harold J. Stone is cast as outlaw Gabe Larkin, supposedly the last of the Comancheros.
- In the 1960 episode "The Last Viking" of the series Bonanza, Neville Brand plays a member of a band of outlaws referred to as "Comancheros".
- The film The Comancheros (1961), starring John Wayne and Lee Marvin, was based on the 1952 novel of the same name by Paul Wellman.
- The 1972 film The Revengers features a band of Indians, led by Comancheros, stealing horses and killing settlers.
- A band of Comancheros appeared as attempted rapists in the 1976 film The Outlaw Josey Wales.

== See also ==
- Jose Tafoya
