= Presidio of San Sabá =

Coordinates: 30.9222°N 99.8014°W

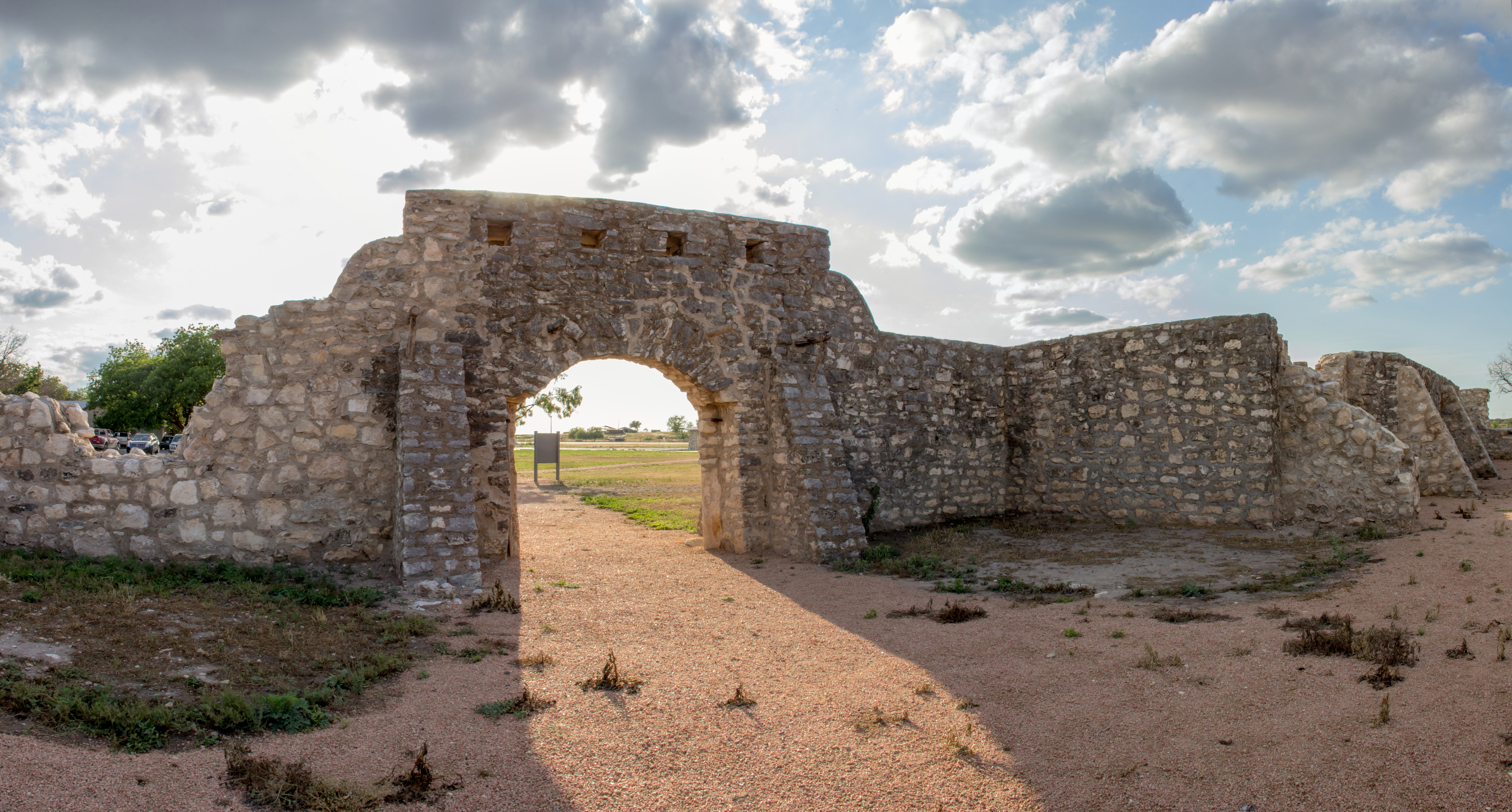

The Presidio of San Sabá was the second presidio established at the site of present-day Menard, Texas on the San Saba River. The first was the Presidio San Luis de las Amarillas, established by Colonel Diego Ortiz Parrilla in April 1757, the same time that Mission Santa Cruz de San Sabá was also founded by Fr. Alonso Giraldo de Terreros some three miles downstream. Initially, both the presidio and mission were enclosed by a wooden stockade. About 2,000 Comanche and Wichita warriors attacked and destroyed the mission March 16, 1758, but did not attack the presidio. Colonel Parrilla led a punitive expedition against the hostiles about one year later, but was defeated in the Battle of the Twin Villages at a large Wichita village on the Red River. Colonel Parrilla was relieved of command as a consequence of this setback and replaced by Captain Felipe de Rábago y Terán.

Captain Rábago immediately undertook replacing the temporary wooden stockade with a permanent stone structure. The new presidio was a 300-by-360-foot (91 by 110 m) rectangle surrounded by walls 5 feet (1.5 m) thick and rising to a height of 15 to 20 feet (4.6 to 6.1 m) with two watch towers armed with six small cannons. The garrison consisted of approximately 90 soldados de cuera with another 30 soldados stationed at Mission San Lorenzo de la Santa Cruz on the upper Nueces River. An inspection report by Marqués de Rubí in 1767 indicated the soldiers were ill-equipped and had but 100 mounts available for service. Rubí and his engineer Nicolas de Lafora concluded that the presidio was 'of no advantage whatever." and it was closed in 1769.

Although the Comanches and their Wichita allies were never able to breach the presidio's walls, their constant harassment of patrols, supply trains, and foragers made life at the presidio unbearable. Conditions deteriorated to the point that Captain Rábago abandoned the post without authorization in June 1768, evacuating the garrison, women, and children to the relative safety of Mission San Lorenzo de la Santa Cruz. For this action he, too, was relieved of command, and replaced by Captain Manuel Antonio de Oca. Captain Oca reoccupied the presidio in early 1770, but, like his predecessor, he abandoned it for good later that same year.

Settlers arriving in the 19th century used the stones from the presidio's walls to build house, out-buildings and corrals. A partial reconstruction of the presidio was carried out in 1936 as part of the Texas Centennial. The site today is maintained by the City of Menard, Texas.
