= Presidio San Luis de las Amarillas =

- Site of Presidio San Luis de las Amarillas
- U.S. National Register of Historic Places
- Texas State Antiquities Landmark
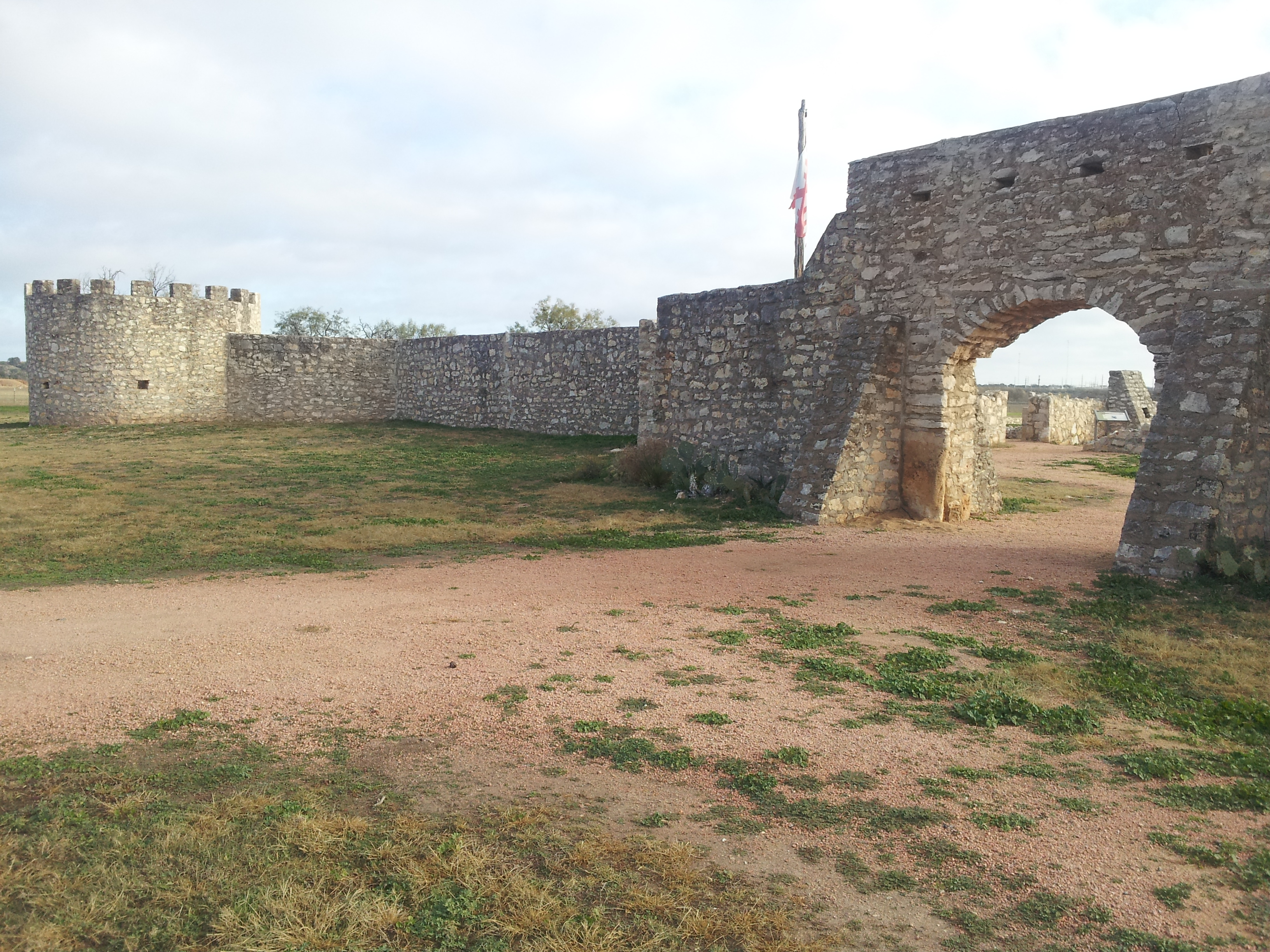
- Presidio de San Saba in 2013

- Location within Texas Location within the United States
- Nearest city: Menard, Texas
- Coordinates: 30°55′21″N 99°48′6″W
- Area: 15.5 acres (6.3 ha)
- Built: 1757
- NRHP reference No.: 72001369
- TSAL No.: 473

Significant dates
- Added to NRHP: August 25, 1972
- Designated TSAL: 5/28/1981

Presidio San Luis de las Amarillas, now better known as Presidio of San Sabá, was founded in April 1757 near present-day Menard, Texas, United States to protect the Mission Santa Cruz de San Sabá, established at the same time. The presidio and mission were built to secure Spain's claim to the territory. They were part of the treaty recently reached with the Lipan Apaches of the area for mutual aid against enemies. The early functioning of the mission and presidio were undermined by Hasinai, also allied with the Spanish, attacking the Apaches. The mission was located three miles downstream from the presidio by request of the monks at the mission to ensure that the Spanish soldiers would not be a corrupting influence on the Lipan Apaches the monks were trying to convert to Christianity. The original presidio and mission were built out of logs.

On March 16, 1758, am army of an estimated 2000 Comanche and Wichita Indians, bitter enemies of the Lipan Apache, attacked Mission Santa Cruz de San Sabá. The presidio sent a small force to aid the mission, but the soldiers were driven back. Two of the three priests at the mission were killed and the mission was destroyed. The Indians did not attack the presidio.

More than a year later, a force of 600 men from the presidio set out to find and punish the Indians responsible for the attack on the mission. The Spanish force was repulsed with heavy losses and the presidio commander was relieved of command. The new commander replaced the log stockade with a stone compound and was renamed, Presidio de San Saba'. The post was abandoned in 1768, reoccupied briefly in 1770, then permanently abandoned.

A portion of the presidio was rebuilt as a Works Progress Administration project for the Texas Centennial in 1936.

== History ==
=== Foundation ===
In June 1753, Lt. Juan Galvan and Father Miguel de Aranda were sent on an expedition to explore Apacheria, and selected a spot on the San saba river for a mission, marking the spot with a large wooden cross. a subsequent expedition by Pedro de Rabago y Teran and Father Jose Lopes in Dec. 1754 to the same area named the site "Paso de la Santa Cruz", and recommended a stone and mortar fort with four curtains with two guns each. On 18 May 1756, Viceroy Marques de las Amarillas ordered Col. Diego Ortiz Parrilla to assume command of the San Xavier Presidio and transfer it along with the missions there to the San Saba site, the new presidio to be named after the Viceroy. Parilla was to take 50 men at the San Xavier garrison, and augment them with 22 from San Antonio and 27 new recruits.

Parilla was the former governor of Sinaloa and Sonora, captain of the Presidio de San Miguel de Horcasitas, and made a colonel in 1755. On 5 April 1775, Parrilla left 39 soldiers in a temporary camp with his livestock and supplies, and marched with 22 soldiers plus 6 Franciscan friars under Father Alonso Giraldo de Terreros, for the San Saba site, reaching it on 17 April. After the soldiers and supplies from the temporary camp arrived, the mission and quarters with irrigation ditch, plus barracks and family quarters for the soldiers and their 237 women and children, were built from logs and separated by three miles on opposite sides of the river.

In June, a band of 3000 Apaches arrived under the leadership of El Chico and Casablanca passed through on their way to attack the Comanches further north, but did not stay long on their return trip. With no Indians to teach, only the Queretaran Mission was built.

=== Attack ===
On the night of 25 Feb. 1758, while Joseph Antonio Flores was Sergeant of the Guard, the Presidio's livestock was stampeded by Indians, resulting in the loss of 59 horses. A detachment of 6 men under Corporal Carlos de Uraga was attacked on the Pedernales River the next day, while on their way to warn Lt. Juan Galvan's supply train en route from San Antonio. Parilla reinforced the supply train of 50 pack animals with 22 men, and provided 8 soldiers, with two cannons, to the Mission on 15 March when Father Terreros refused to seek sanctuary at the Presidio.

Three hours after sunrise on 16 March, Joseph Gutierrez arrived at the Presidio, having been sent by the Mission steward, to tell of "the arrival of the Indians and their bad behavior", the Indians armed with "French firearms, bullet pouches, and very large powder horns...others had pikes, and still others, bows and arrows; but most of them had muskets and cutlasses..." Parilla then sent Sergeant Flores and four men to reinforce the Mission., where he discovered "the road for almost three quarters of a league crowded with hostile Indians, and the Mission stockade completely surrounded by Indians firing their muskets." Still attempting to enter the Mission, Flores' men advanced but the "Indians formed a column and marched rapidly toward the Presidio...as soon as the Indians had advanced to within musket range, they fired a volley at the squad of soldiers", wounding three. Flores estimated 1,500 Indians were moving forward to attack the Presidio, when he saw 3 San Antonio Mission Indians who "brought the news that the Texas and Comanche Indians had set fire to the stockyard and the houses at the Mission..."

Parilla held a council of war, where it was decided "the surprise assault on the Mission was now an accomplished fact and its destruction verified...the Presidio lay exposed to a similar attack...the Indians...could easily overwhelm any detachment sent out from the Presidio." Parilla collected all 59 of his remaining men (41 were on assignment elsewhere), plus the 237 women and children, into the Presidio at sunset, and then sent Flores to determine the situation at the Mission. Flores discovered "all the dwellings and other Mission buildings were in flames..." Several were able to escape however, including Father Miguel Molina as "the Indians were intent upon pillage and plunder, presuming that no one could escape alive through the flames raging everywhere."

Lt. Juan Galvan's supply train force of 22 soldiers and muleteers arrived at the Presidio on 17 March. The next day, the Indians were observed to be marching north. The Indians had slain 8 persons, including Fathers Terreros and Santiesteban, while 17 of the Indians were killed.

During the summer a large band of Apaches near the Presidios were attacked by northern Indians, killing 50 plus, and in Dec., another 21 were killed by northern Indians, all armed with muskets. On 30 March 1759, Indians stole 700 horses, mules and cattle belonging to the Presidio, killing the detail of soldiers assigned to guard them, leaving the garrison with only 27 horses.

=== Vengeance ===
On 27 June 1758, the Viceroy Marques de las Amarillas approved a campaign to punish the northern tribes. Parilla held a special council in San Antonio, on 3 Jan. 1759, with the governors of Coahuila and Texas plus the frontier officers, in which they recommended a force of 500. The Viceroy approved the plan on 30 March as did King Ferdinand VI. Parilla's campaign force left in August and consisted of 50 men from his Presidio's garrison plus 360 additional soldiers from San Antonio, Presidio del Rio Grande and Presidio del Reyno, plus included 176 Indian allies (134 Apaches acted as scouts and guides).

Parilla attacked a Tonkawa Village along the Clear Fork Brazos River on 2 Oct., and then a Taovayas (Wichitas) village along the Red River on 7 Oct. in the Battle of the Twin Villages The Tonkawas lost 55 killed and 149 taken prisoner, but led the Spanish on to the larger Wichita village in "French country", which included a stockade and between 2,000 and 6,000 Wichitas and Comanche allies. According to Parilla, "the enemy considered themselves secure in their fort. Those outside, with the help of those within, began to fire..." from a thickly wooded area and then "First one then the other flank gave way." Parilla's twin cannons had little effect on the fort, and by nightfall, retreated to his camp, leaving the cannons and suffering 19 dead, 14 wounded and 19 missing, but claiming to have killed "the chief of greatest acclaim among the Indians" and 50 others, wounding many more. Parilla waited three days before leading an orderly retreat back to the Presidio, reaching it on 25 Oct.

=== Aftermath ===
Marques de Cruillas took over as Viceroy from Marques de las Amarillas in 1760, assigned Parilla the governorship of Coahuila and installed Capt. Felipe de Rabago y Teran as commander of the Presidio. Within a year, Rabago rebuilt the stockade with limestone, including rooms built into the walls, a blockhouse and a moat, bringing the garrison up to full strength and well mounted. Rabago explored the Concho River and sent an exploratory expedition west to the Pecos River in the spring of 1761.

On 16 January 1762, Rabago established Mission San Lorenzo de la Santa Cruz with Father Diego Jimenez along the El Rio de San Jose (upper Nueces River) for Apache Chief Cabezon's tribe, manning it with 20 men under Lt. Manuel Valdez. Nearby they also founded Mission Nuestra senora de la Candelaria nearby for El Turnio's tribe, and protected it with 10 soldiers. Yet in June 1762, the Presidio once again was raided by the northern Indians, killing 2 soldiers and taking 70 horses.

In 1764, Rabago reported a "severe attack on the Presidio", and in 1765, a detachment of 3 soldiers were killed in a Frio River Canyon ambush. Rabago noted in 1767 that the Comanches had made five attempts on the Presidio since Oct. of 1766, including three attempts on his supply trains.

=== Inspection ===
King Charles III sent his Inspector general Marqués de Rubí, accompanied by Nicolas de Lafora, on a tour of New Spain in 1766, after the acquisition of Louisiana following the Seven Years' War. Rubí visited the Presidio in July 1766, reporting it served no purpose or advantage, "It affords as much protection to the interests of His Majesty in New Spain as a ship anchored in mid-Atlantic would afford in preventing foreign trade with America." Of the 24 presidios along the northern frontier, Rubí recommended the Presidio and 8 others be abandoned, forming a new frontier line from San Antonio to Santa Fe to the Gulf of California.

=== Abandonment ===
The Comanches stole the Presidio's entire herd of cattle on 10 Dec. 1767, Indians attacked again on 2 Jan. 1768, stole horses outside the wall on 14 Jan., then captured and tortured to death Lt. Joaquin Orendain and three other soldiers on 29 Feb. Then the garrison was afflicted with scurvy, Mal de Loanda, forcing Rabago to abandon the Presidio for the Mission San Lorenzo in the Valle de San Jose (El Canon) on 22 June. On 1 April 1769, Rabago was replaced as commander of the Presidio by Capt. Manuel Antonio de Oca, who took the garrison back to San Saba but retreated again to El Canon in early 1770. By 8 June 1771, Jacobo de Ugarte y Loyala, Governor of Coahuila, removed 29 men to San Antonio, and on 21 June 1771, the Viceroy called for the removal of the garrison entirely and the abandonment of the two missions at El Canon. In 1772, King Charles III issued a decree abandoning the Presidio, leaving East Texas entirely, and making San Antonio the new capital of Texas.

== San Saba Silver Mines ==
A mine was started in August 1752 by five Spaniards from San Antonio in an area identified by Apaches containing gossan, Los Almagres to the Spanish. This pit, cueva in Spanish, was later identified to be "Boyd's shaft" in "Boyd's Pasture" along the Almagre or Honey Creek, a tributary of the Llano River. This range of hills where gossan is found, lies between the former presidios of San Saba and San Antonio de Bexar, in southeastern Llano County, today's Riley Mountains.

No ore of value was discovered but the governor of Texas, Jacinto de Barrios y Jauregui, on 26 Nov. 1755, appointed Bernardo de Miranda y Flores Teniente General of an expedition to this and another deposit of almagre. Miranda kept a journal of his twenty-three man strong expedition from 17 Feb. to 10 March 1756, followed by a report to Governor Barrios on 29 March 1756 and a petition to the Viceroy on 15 Feb. 1757. On 26 Feb., his journal noted he put his men to work so that the "pit could be cleaned out and examined to see if any ore veins could be found", "a tremendous stratum of ore was observed", and he named the pit of almagre San Joseph del Alcazar. In his report to the governor, Miranda stated, "The mines that are throughout the Cerro del Almagre and all its slope are so abundant", ten claims had already been filed, "that I guarantee to give a mine to each of all the inhabitants of this province of Texas...at many of the mines the owners will be able to install haciendas" (de fundicion and de beneficio for smelting and chemical reduction respectively). Miranda reported he could not travel to another "Almagre Grande", as "many Spaniards would be needed" because of the threat of Comanche Indians living there. In his petition to the Viceroy, Miranda noted he had "crudely removed some ore, which is what was assayed".

This three pound sample of ore, and Miranda's report, were sent by Barrios to Manuel de Aldaco in Mexico City, who had it assayed by smelting and amalgamation. Smelting assayed five ounces of silver per hundred pounds of ore, too poor for smelting, while no silver could be extracted from amalgamation. Aldaco's report asked for thirty cargas of almagre for further testing.

In Miranda's petition to the Viceroy regarding this requested thirty loads of ore, he requested "these expenses be paid from the account of the royal treasury", promising to "execute all that is prescribed in the referred report" and "I will make other discoveries". Otherwise, Miranda proposed to "pay all of it through my industry and perservance with the condition that I be the captain of the soldiers", noting "a presidio of at least thirty men to restrain the Indians" was required.

The Presidio of San Sabá commander, Capt. Diego Ortiz Parrilla, had seventy-five pounds of ore smelted, which yielded an ounce and a half of silver, prompting him to suggest the presidio be moved to Los Almagres in 1757. Yet, the destruction of Mission Santa Cruz de San Saba by the Comanches in 1758, and increased Indian depredations made the area difficult for the Spanish and location of the mines was eventually forgotten.

In 1789, five miners working the Los Almagres mines, near the Llano River, were murdered in their sleep by Lipan Apaches on their way to confront Col. Juan de Ugalde.

Stephen F. Austin's replaced "Presidio of San Saba" on his 1827 map with "Silver Mines" on his 1829 edition. Austin's 1831 pamphlet on Texas stated on the San Saba River, "traditions say a rich silver mine was successfully wrought many years since, until the Comanche Indians cut off the workmen."

Visiting the ruins in the 1840s, Ferdinand von Roemer noted, "According to legends still told in Texas, the Spaniards were supposed to have worked some rich silver mines here, and the old fort was supposedly erected to protect a mine nearby. We therefore first looked for smelting ovens and heaps of slag...when we failed to find any traces of either, we made examinations to determine if the geological conditions were the kind which would indicate the presence of precious metal. The presence of silver ore in unchanged, horizontal limestone and marl of the Cretaceous formation would be without precedent...it is not improbable that the changed Transition rocks, containing quartz, which appear about forty miles downstream near the mouth of the San Saba, as well as the granite rocks which appear particularly between the San Saba and Llano, contain ore, although observations on our journey did not furnish direct proof for this." On the main portal of the fort, Roemer found the following names: Padilla, 1810; Cos, 1829; Bowie (con su tropa), 1829; Moore, 1840.

== Comanches and the German Colony ==
Near the fort was the site of a council meeting between Comanches chiefs and representatives of the Adelsverein, including Buffalo Hump, Santa Anna, Mope-choco-pe, and John O. Meusebach, which eventually led to the Meusebach-Comanche Treaty. "As Neighbors and his companions were traveling through the prairie, the party suddenly saw through the mesquite trees the walls of the old Spanish fort looming up in front of them..."

== Gallery ==
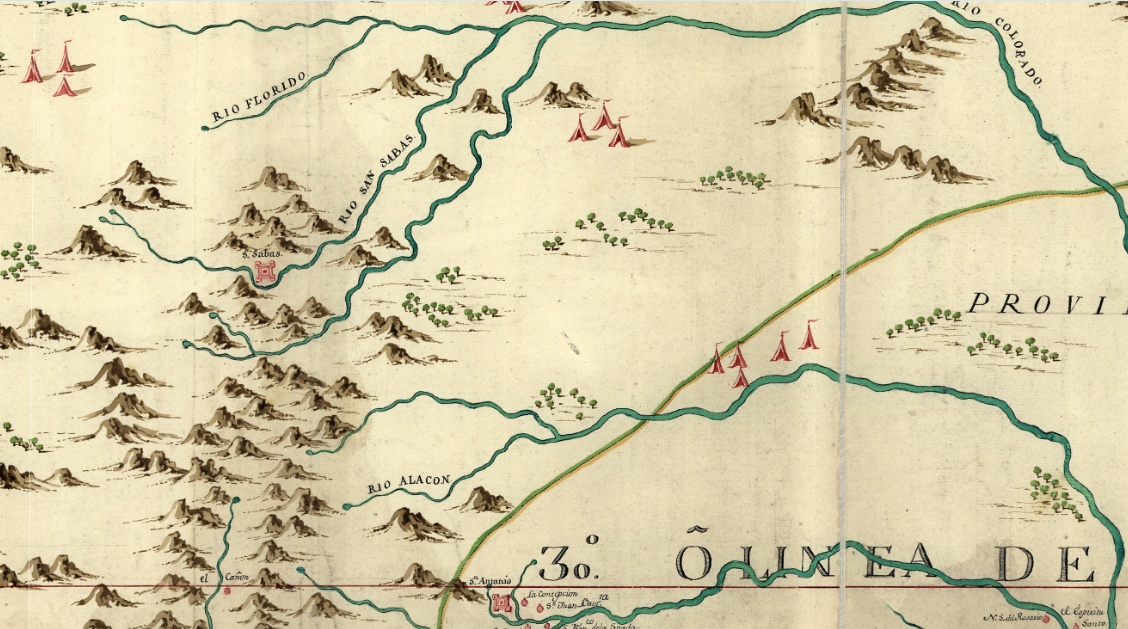
1769 map depicting Presidio "San Sabas" in relation to San Antonio

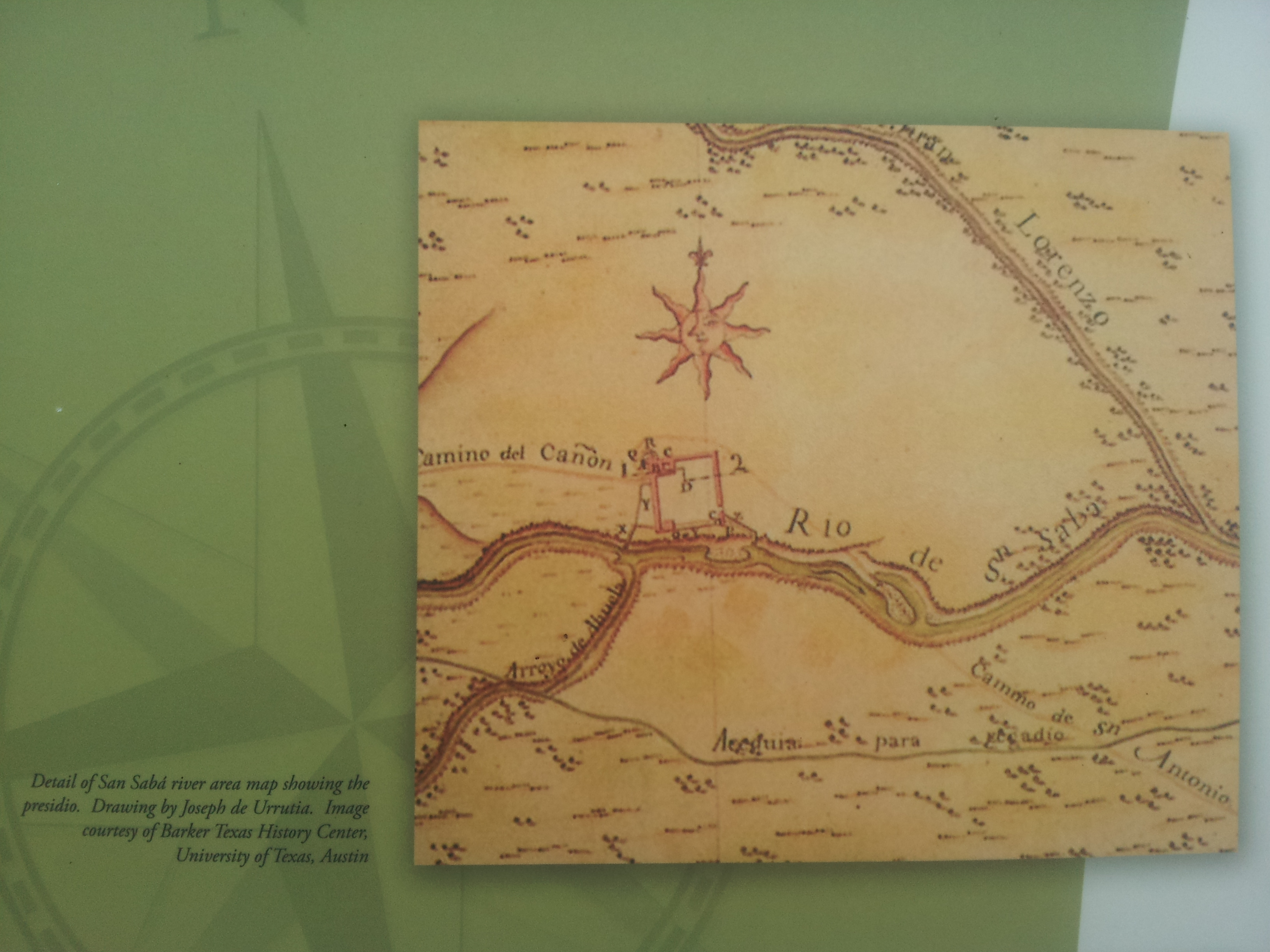
Urrutia's map of the Rio de San Saba area showing the presidio on the north bank and the Acequia para regadio (irrigation canal) to the south

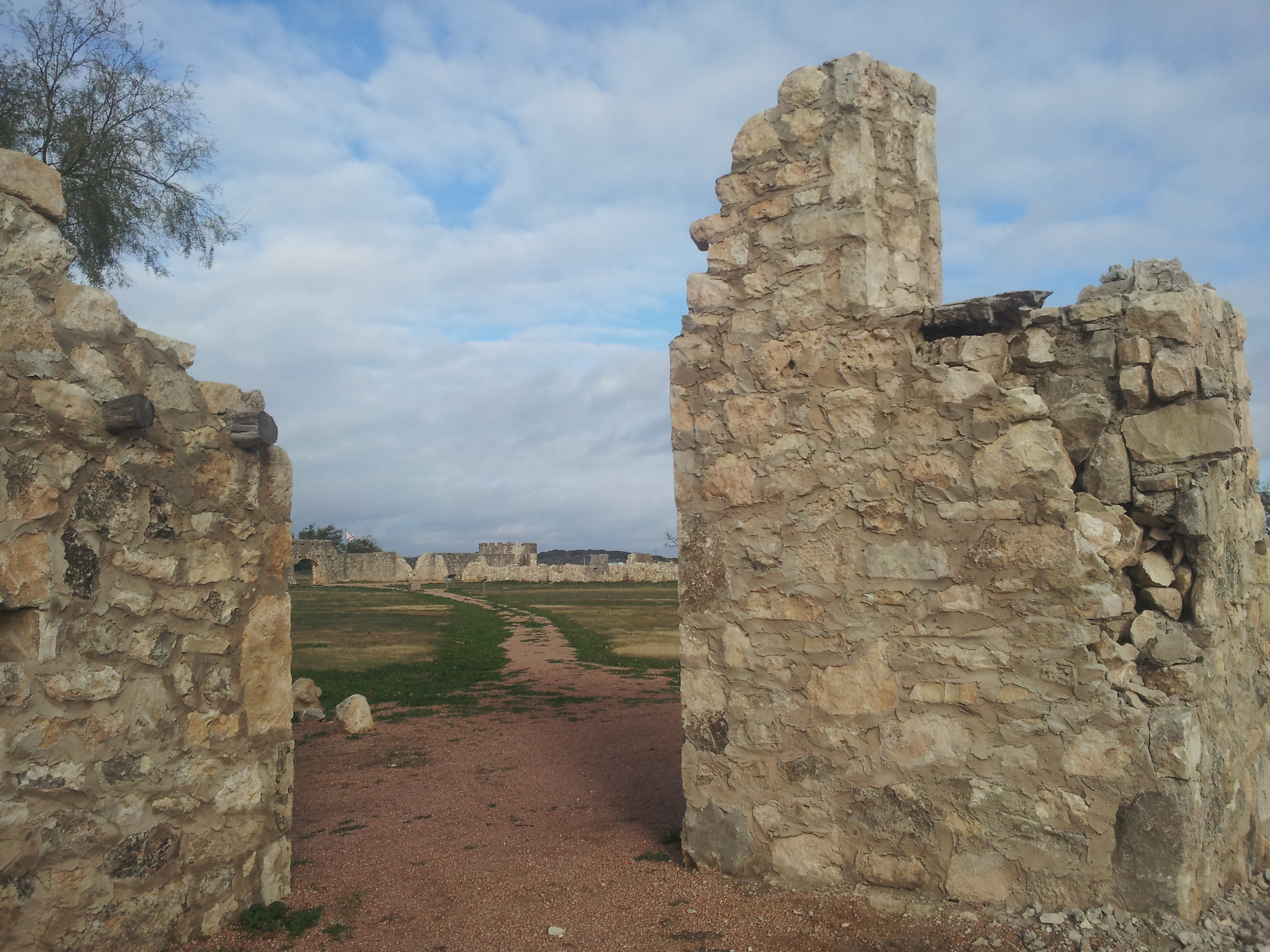
The presidio looking in from the southeast bastion

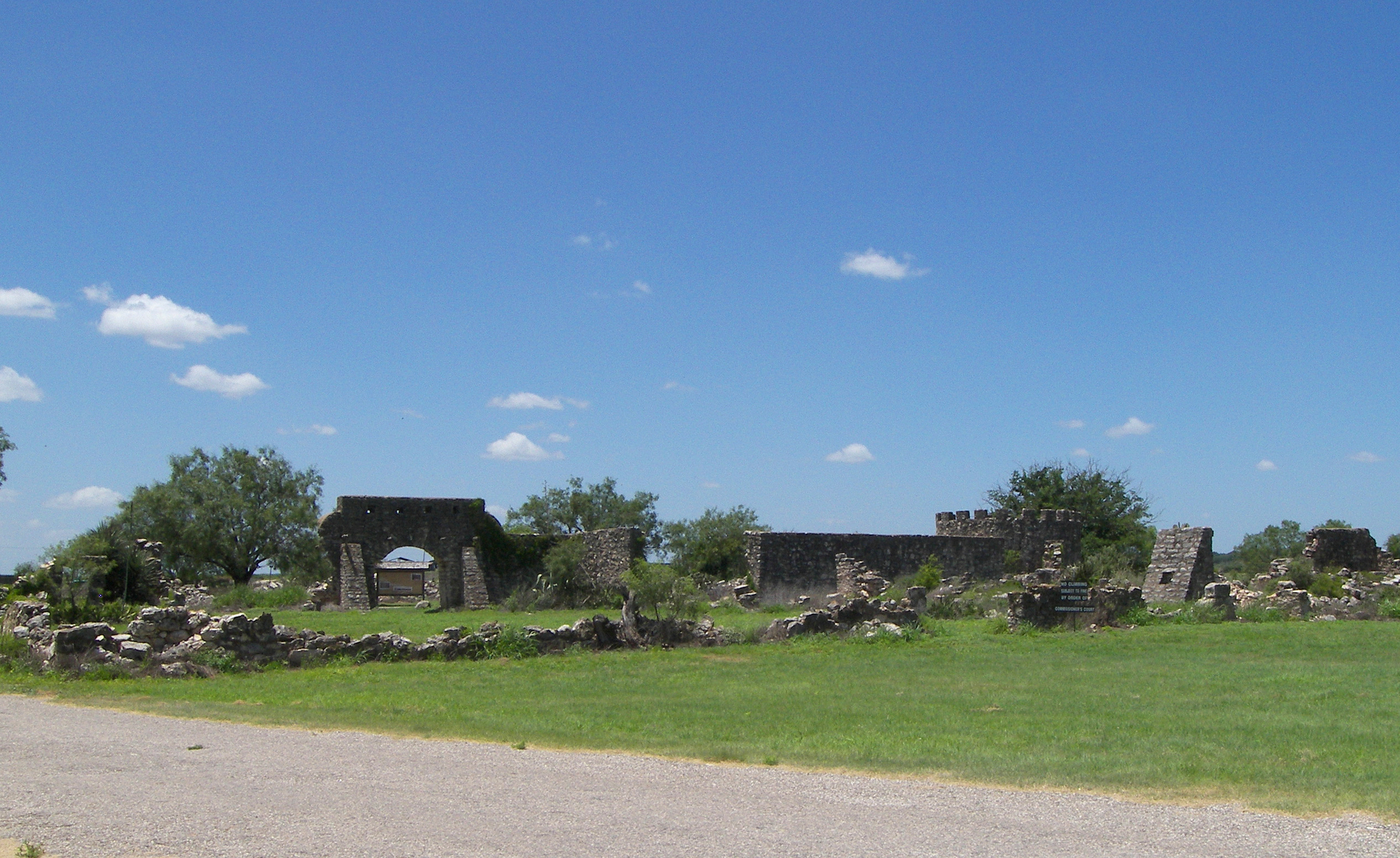
The ruins of Presidio San Luis de las Amarillas in 2010.

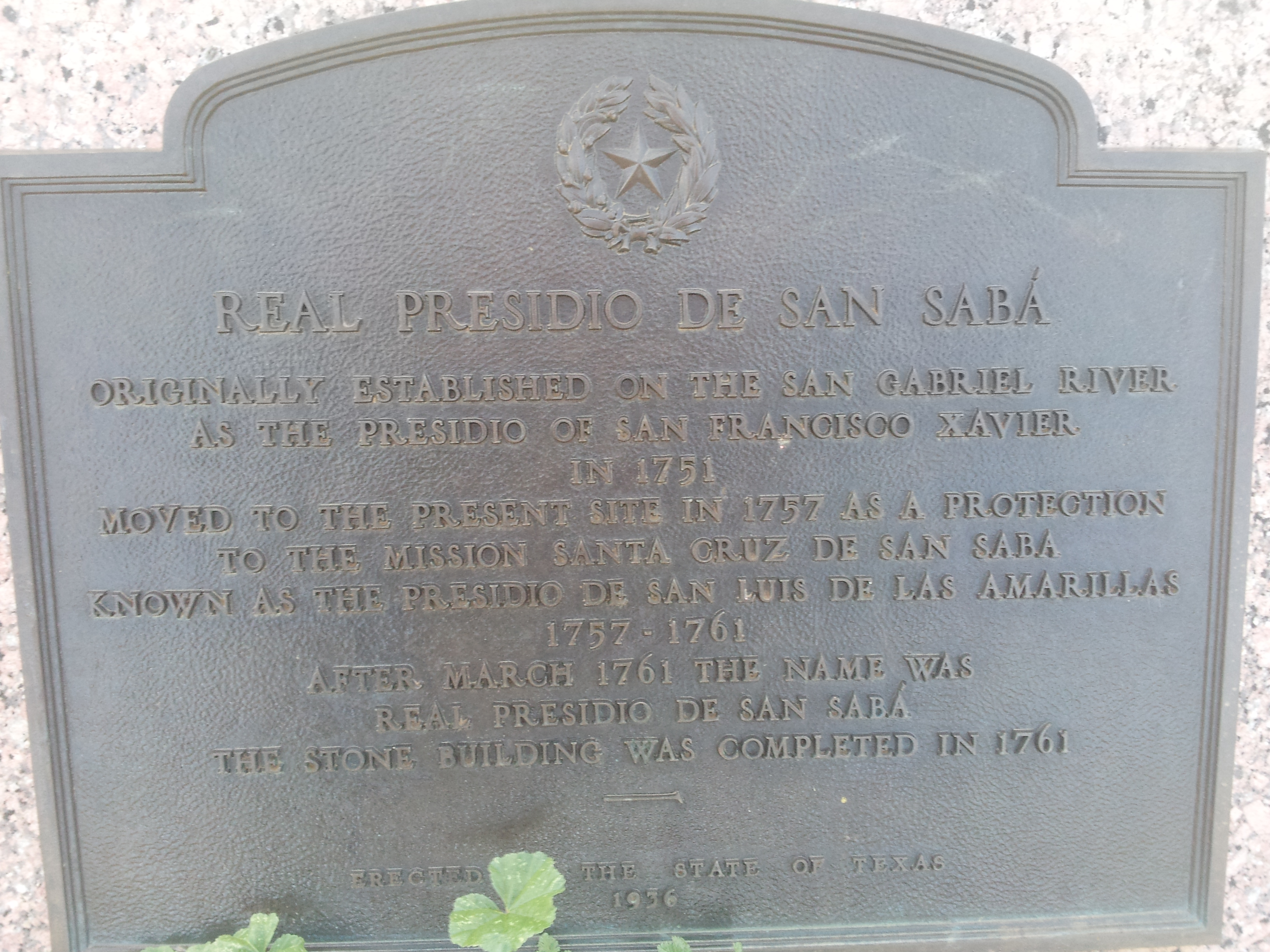
Historical marker

== See also ==
- Presidio La Bahia
- Texas Forts Trail
- San Sabá fight (1831)
- presidiodesansaba.org
