= Mission Santa Cruz de San Sabá =

Former Spanish mission in Texas

Coordinates: 30.9162°N 99.7348°W

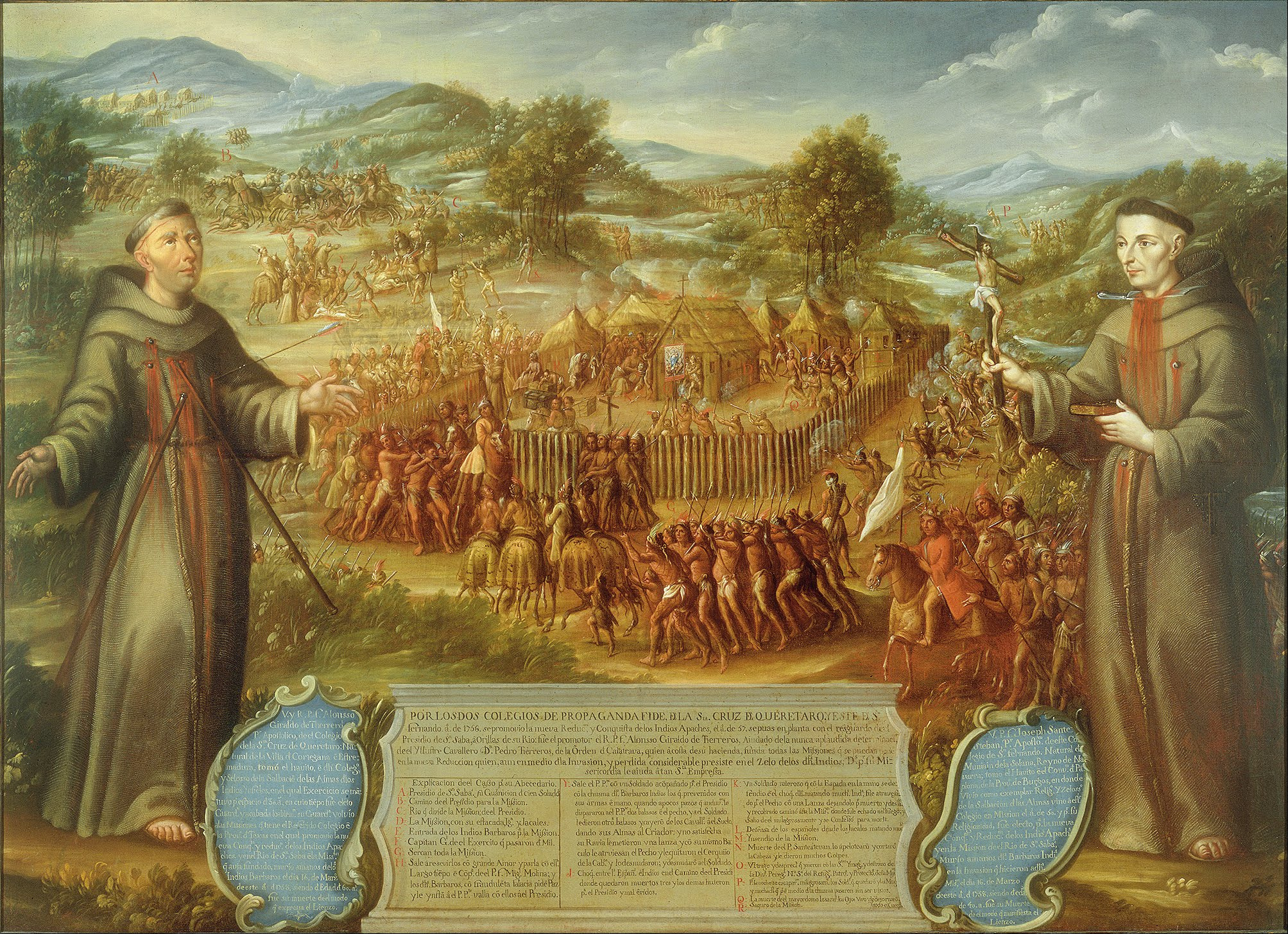
The destruction of the mission of San Sabá in the province of Texas. Oil on canvas. 237 x 527.5 cm. ca. 1765. Museo Nacional de Arte, Mexico. An English translation of the inscription is found on the article on painter José de Páez

Mission Santa Cruz de San Sabá was one of the Spanish missions in Texas. It was established in April 1757, along with the Presidio San Luis de las Amarillas, later renamed Presidio of San Sabá, in what is now Menard County. Located along the San Saba River, the mission was intended to convert members of the Lipan Apache tribe. Although no Apache ever resided at the mission, its existence convinced the Comanche that the Spanish had allied with the Comanche's mortal enemy. In 1758 the mission was destroyed by an estimated 2,000 warriors from the Comanche, Tonkawa, Yojuane, Bidai and Hasinai tribes. It was the only mission in Texas to be completely destroyed by Native Americans. The Indians did not attack the nearby presidio.

In retaliation, the Spanish government authorized an expedition in 1759 to attack the Comanche. Colonel Diego Ortiz Parrilla led over 500 Spanish soldiers and Apache braves into Comanche territory. Along the Red River, Spanish soldiers encountered a Wichita village which had been heavily fortified, complete with a moat and wooden stockade. The Indians lured Ortiz into an ambush and after a four-hour battle in which the Spanish suffered 19 dead, he and his troops retreated, leaving two cannon in the hands of the Indians.

To commemorate the destruction of Santa Cruz de San Sabá, Pedro Romero de Terreros, a benefactor, commissioned a painting in 1762, completed in 1765 (illustration). This became the first work of art to depict an historical event in Spanish Texas. An historical marker was erected near the site of the mission, and archaeological excavations were carried out in the 1990s.

== Background ==
In 1716, Spanish officials authorized the settlement of the border province Spanish Texas, in the hopes of checking the influence of French missionaries and traders in neighboring Louisiana. Over the next several years, missionaries established a series of Spanish missions in Texas, ministering primarily to the Hasinai and Coahuiltecan tribes. By 1731, many of the missions were relocated to the San Antonio River, and the number of soldiers in Texas was cut to 144.

Spanish economic policies were designed to discourage its colonists from trading with other nations. All goods meant for Texas were supposed to be shipped to Veracruz and brought overland to San Antonio. The costs and difficulty of transportation made goods very expensive, making it difficult for settlers or missionaries to afford items that could be traded with, or offered as a gift to, the native tribes.

Native tribes were able to trade freely, and some accumulated French guns, while others traded or stole Spanish horses. Tribes without access to either resource were left at a disadvantage. The Lipan Apache, who had been seasonal farmers, were soon pressed by the Comanche, who had horses, and the Wichita, who had guns. The Apaches were bitter enemies of the Hasinai tribes of East Texas and had transferred their enmity to the Spanish as friends of those tribes. Over the next several decades, the Apache frequently raided Spanish settlements.

The Apache also raided other tribes, including the Deadose and Tonkawa. In the 1740s, these weaker tribes requested missions along the San Gabriel River in the hopes that the Spanish could protect them from attack. Mission San Francisco Xavier was established at the confluence of the San Gabriel River and Bushy Creek in January 1746 to serve the Deadose, Mayeye, and Coco Indians. In 1748 alone, the Apaches raided the mission four times, killing three soldiers and four of the Indian residents. Many of the resident Indians fled the mission due to the threat of attacks. This did not deter the missionaries, who founded two more missions, San Ildefonso (mission) and Nuestra Señora de la Candelaria (mission), in the area the following year. Within six months, all of the potential converts at San Ildefonso had left. By 1755, the missions were transferred to a new location on the San Marcos River.

== Establishment ==
In August 1749, the Apache and Spanish agreed to peace. The Apache began to request Spanish missions. Authorities repeatedly denied these requests, wary that the Apache were trying to gain Spanish aid in attacking the Comanches. However, the Spanish believed that if the effort was successful in converting Apaches and convincing them to remain peaceful, the missionary activity could be expanded northward. If a large enough area could become peaceful, the Spanish might be able to establish an overland route to Santa Fe.

In 1752, Spanish authorities approved an expedition to explore the Apache territory and locate a site for a possible mission. The following year a small group, led by Juan Galván and including Father Miguel de Aranda, who worked at Mission Concepción, travelled northwest of San Antonio, exploring the Pedernales River, the Llano River, and the San Saba River. The San Saba River area appeared most promising as the soil was fertile, there seemed to be mineral deposits in the area, and local Apache promised to come to a mission. Galván recommended that a mission be founded along the San Saba, and that a presidio be established nearby to protect the mission against the Comanche.

The viceroy ordered a second expedition of the area in 1754. Former governor of Texas Pedro de Rábago y Terán explored the same area and concurred with Galván's recommendation. The people of San Antonio were enthusiastic about the proposal, hoping that a new northern settlement would protect their town from raids. The governor still hesitated, and in 1756 asked Lieutenant Governor Bernardo de Miranda to again explore the area. While exploring, Miranda heard rumors from the Apache of silver deposits near San Sabá and again recommended the area.

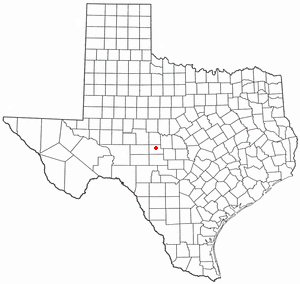
The mission was established near modern-day Menard, TX

In 1757, authorities finally approved the mission. For three years, the mission would be funded by local mine owner Pedro Romero de Terreros, whose cousin, Father Alonso Giraldo de Terreros, would run the mission. After three years, the government would pay mission expenses, and the government would also fund the garrison. The missions along the San Marcos River would be closed, and all of their assets would be purchased by Pedro Terreros and transferred to the new mission. Unlike most missions, this one would report to the viceroy instead of the governor.

Franciscan missionaries were assigned from the College of Santa Cruz de Querétaro and the College of San Fernando de México. Authorities had also authorized the building of a fort to protect the mission and its occupants. Missionaries were afraid that the Spanish soldiers might corrupt their converts and insisted that the fort be built 3 miles (4.8 km) away and on the other side of the river. The missionaries had divided loyalties; some supported Father Terreros, while others were angry that Terreros had been given responsibility over other priests who had long advocated for a mission to the Apaches. The commander of the garrison, Colonel Ortiz Parrilla did not approve of Terreros's appointment and also questioned the motives of the Apache. He delayed the journey several times. The missionaries, soldiers and their families left San Antonio for the San Saba River in April 1757. They brought with them 1,400 cattle and 700 sheep.

There were no Apache waiting at the mission site, and after five days of searching Ortiz was unable to find any Apache. Ortiz attempted to halt the expedition, but the six missionaries refused to leave. The mission was built near modern-day Menard. Presidio San Luis de las Amarillas was built at the same time on the other side of the river and 3 miles away as demanded by the priests. Apache representatives periodically appeared at the mission, promising that they would soon relocate to the missions, but none ever did. Three of the six missionaries returned to San Antonio.

== Destruction ==
The presence of the mission infuriated Comanche leaders, who saw San Sabá as proof of an alliance between the Spanish and Apache and an encroachment on their land. The Apache encouraged this perception, leaving Spanish-made items, such as shoes, behind when they raided Comanche camps. The garrison soon heard rumors that hundreds of Comanche warriors were moving towards the mission. Ortiz requested that the missionaries move into the presidio, but they refused. Because so many women and children lived in the fort, Ortiz could spare only a few soldiers to remain at the mission with the priests. The Comanche allied with other traditional Apache enemies, including the Tonkawa and Hasinai, and on March 16, 1758, this force of about 2,000 warriors attacked the mission. According to Spanish accounts, at least half of the warriors carried European guns, an unusual event in a time when most natives fought with bow and arrow or hatchets.

Eight people died, including Father Terreros, and the mission was burned to the ground. Almost every animal in the mission compound was killed, including the cattle. One missionary and about 20 other people escaped to the presidio. The Comanche gathered near the fort and tried to entice the soldiers to come outside the safety of the wooden walls. When their ploys did not work, the natives left on March 18. The San Sabá mission was the only Spanish mission in Texas to be completely destroyed by a native attack.

== Response ==
Spanish authorities were livid and determined to make a dramatic statement so that the tribes would not take advantage of perceived Spanish weakness. They chose not to disband the presidio, as that would appear to be a retreat. In January 1759, a junta met in San Antonio to determine the appropriate military response. They were unable to get significant numbers of volunteers among the citizens in Texas and neighboring Nuevo León and instead recommended that the force include soldiers, militiamen, and natives.

The government committed 52,000 pesos to fund the expedition and the next several months were spent recruiting men. While these arrangements were being made, Comanche raided the horse herd at the San Sabá presidio, killing twenty soldiers. This event strengthened the Spanish resolve. In September, 1759, Colonel Diego Ortiz Parrilla, the commander of the garrison tasked with protecting the mission, and his 500 soldiers and Apache braves marched north into Comanche territory. On October 2 they engaged in a skirmish along the Brazos River, taking 149 natives captives. Several days later they repulsed a native attack and followed the attackers to the Red River. There, the Spanish encountered the Comanche and other tribes at a fortified village of the Taovayas, a Wichita people. The town had been surrounded by a stockade and a moat and flew a French flag.

Ortiz's men were inexperienced and faced a group that had been forewarned and were well-prepared. The Spanish and Apache attacked, resulting in 52 of their group killed, wounded, or deserted. Ortiz ordered a retreat, and the group reached San Sabá on October 29.

== Impact ==
The incident proved that the French had made great inroads with the Comanche and other northern tribes, and those tribes had learned European-style fighting tactics. Many Spanish officials believed that the French had instigated the attack on the mission and had helped the Comanche to prepare the village, but historian David Weber said the evidence for this charge is inconclusive.

Given the superiority of Comanche numbers and the fact that the Comanche now had similar firepower to Spanish officials, many Spanish soldiers began to fear for their own safety. Several of the soldiers garrisoned at the San Sabá presidio asked for transfers, and the commander of the garrison at Presidio La Bahía wrote that "The enemy [is] so superior ... in firearms as well as in numbers, that our destruction seems probable." Spanish officials refused to close the San Sabá presidio, ordering it rebuilt in limestone surrounded by a moat and augmented its complement of soldiers to 100. For the next decade, Comanche forces remained nearby, killing soldiers who ventured out in small groups.

In July 1767, the Marqués de Rubí on his tour of inspection of presidios visited San Saba. Rubí and his engineer, Nicolás de Lafora, concluded that the presidio was "of no advantage whatever," In 1769, the presidio was moved to San Fernando de Austria (present day Zaragoza), near the Rio Grande 250 miles (400 km) south. For the next several decades, there was little attempt by the Spanish to investigate or settle in the Comanche territory.

In 1762, Pedro Romero de Terreros commissioned a painting to honor his cousin who had died in the attack. The resulting The Destruction of Mission San Sabá in the Province of Texas and the Martyrdom of the Fathers Alonso Giraldo de Terreros, Joseph Santiesteban is the earliest painting known to depict an historical event in Texas. According to the Handbook of Texas, the painting is "the only such work executed in Mexico in the mid-1700s that attempted to document a contemporary historical event". The painting was the subject of some controversy in the 1980s, after United States Customs agents confiscated it in Texas and returned it to Mexico.

In 1936, an historical monument was established at a site tentatively identified as the mission grounds. In 1965, archaeologists began searching for the site of the mission and in 1993 excavation began approximately 1 mile (1.6 km) from the historical monument. Over 300 Spanish artifacts were recovered.

== See also ==
- San Sabá fight (1831)

== Sources ==
- Chipman, Donald E. (1992), Spanish Texas, 1519–1821, Austin, TX: University of Texas Press, ISBN 0-292-77659-4
- Ratcliffe, Sam D. (April 1991), ""Escenas de Martirio": Notes on The Destruction of Mission San Saba", Southwestern Historical Quarterly, 94 (4), Texas State Historical Association: 507–534, archived from the original on 2016-03-14
- Weber, David J. (1992), The Spanish Frontier in North America, Yale Western Americana Series, New Haven, CT: Yale University Press, ISBN 0-300-05198-0
