= Diego Ortiz Parrilla =

Spanish military officer (c.1715–1775)

Diego Parrilla
- Born: c. 1715; Almeria, Spanish Empire
- Died: November 1775 (aged c. 60)
- Military career
- Allegiance: Spanish Empire
- Service years: 1746-1766

Diego Ortiz Parrilla (c. 1715 – November 1775) was an 18th-century Spanish military officer, governor, explorer, and cartographer.

== Early life ==
Diego Ortiz Parrilla was born in Villa de Lúcar, Almería, Spain to a family of distinguished nobility. His exact date of birth is unknown, though he was likely born in 1715.

== Military career ==
=== Early service ===
In 1734, Diego Ortiz Parrilla began his military service as an alférez in a dragoon regiment stationed in Almanza. There are conflicting accounts of his early years in the service, and it has been suggested that Parrilla either began his career fighting "the Moors" or was immediately sent off to serve in Cuba. Parrilla served in Cuba until 1746 when his superior officer, Don Juan Francisco de Güemes, was appointed Viceroy of New Spain and brought key military officers (including Parrilla) with him to Mexico City. Parrilla served as a dragoon captain at the presidio in Veracruz, and in January 1747 led a Spanish military action to suppress a Native revolt in Puebla de los Angeles. In June 1747, he was promoted to lieutenant colonel.

=== Governor of Sinaloa and Sonora ===
Parrilla was appointed as the interim Governor and Captain-General of Nuevo Reyno de Andalucía (later called "Sinaloa and Sonora") on 27 March 1749, and swore his oath of office before the Royal Audiencia of Guadalajara on 12 September. He was also put in charge of Presidio del Pitic, which had recently been moved from its original site (present-day Hermosillo) to what would later become San Miguel de Horcasitas. As part of his new assignment, Parrilla was instructed to destroy the Seri people and their allies: the Carrizos, the Salineros, and the Tiburones. Parrilla imprisoned 252 Native people of all ages and sexes in order to forcibly relocate them and weaken the resistance movement. Assisted by Luis Oacpicagigua, he then captured Tiburón Island and forced its inhabitants from their homeland. Following his successful invasion, Parrilla became the first European to map the island. Although he succeeded in securing their territory, Parrilla failed to wipe out the Native people he had been ordered to destroy; nonetheless, he was promoted to colonel in February 1751.

The Pima Revolt resulted in the deaths of over 100 people over the course of three months in 1751-52. As governor, Parrilla settled a dispute between the militia organized by Luis Oacpicagigua and the Jesuit missionaries who had been targeted in the uprising, pardoning the Native people involved and inspiring a deep resentment among the missionaries of New Spain.

=== Red River Campaign ===
==== San Sabá Mission ====
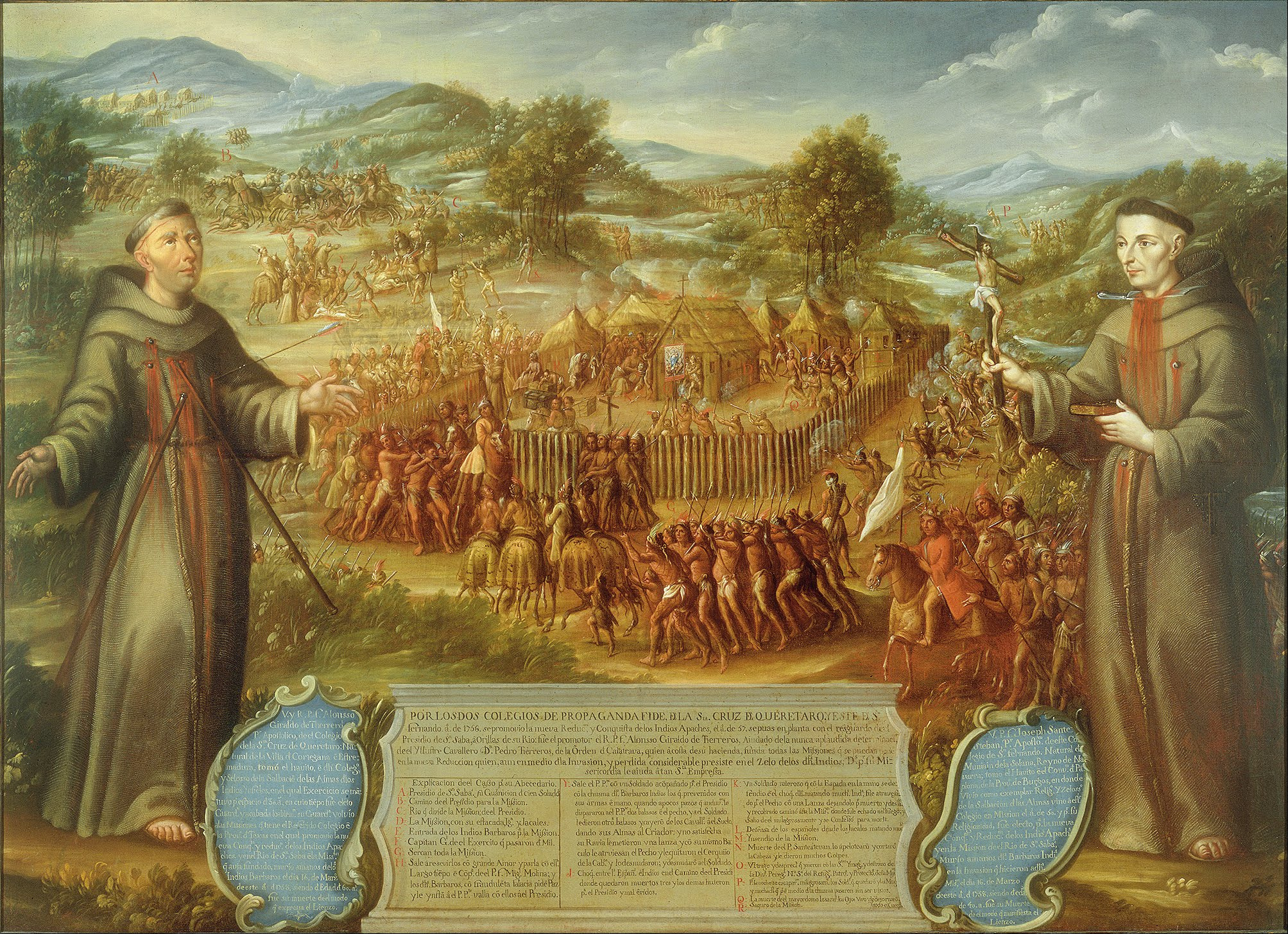
'The Destruction of the Saint Sabá Mission in the Province of Texas and the Martyrdom of the Priests, Fray Alonso Giraldo de Terreros and Fray José de Santiesteban' (José de Páez, circa 1765)

Diego Ortiz Parrilla was replaced as Governor of Sinaloa and Sonora in 1752 and reassigned to his old posting as a dragoon captain at Veracruz. In 1756, Parrilla received notice that his father had died. Being his father's eldest son, Parrilla was granted permission to return to Spain for one year in order to claim his estate. However, his return trip was put on hold when he was appointed commandant of San Sabá de la Santa Cruz, a proposed mission for converting Plains Apache people to Catholicism. Parrilla was given orders to take command of the San Xavier Presidio where the commandant, Felipe de Rábago y Terán, had recently been removed for misconduct. He was then to move the fort to the banks of the San Sabá River. Parrilla made it clear that he did not believe the Apache people were open to conversion, and became personally involved in a feud between two rival factions within the missionary group led by the frays Mariano de los Dolores y Viana and Alonso Giraldo de Terreros, who disagreed about where the mission should be established. Parrilla had visited the site preferred by Dolores and found it very agreeable, but Terreros was president of the mission and his cousin, Pedro Romero de Terreros, was its benefactor; the latter accused Parrilla of wasting time and money by furthering the feud rather than ending it.

Despite his doubts over the viability of the mission and the likelihood of converting any Native people, Parrilla eventually followed through with his orders and arrived at the San Sabá River on 17 April 1757. After exploring the valley, Parrilla established a new fort to protect the missionaries at a site one mile west of present-day Menard, Texas, becoming the first commander of the Presidio San Luis de las Amarillas. Parrilla oversaw geological surveys which searched for mineral deposits and studied ores from the Las Almagres Mine, which would later become well known after it was lost and eventually sought out by treasure hunters such as American frontiersman James Bowie. A log stockade was also built at the fort. The missionaries, distrustful of Parrilla for his handling of the Pima Revolt and the feud months earlier, established their mission to the northeast of the fort.

Over the course of the next eleven months, Parrilla began to fear that a raid on San Sabá was inevitable, and asked the missionaries to relocate to the site of the presidio for protection, but they declined. A 2,000-strong Comanche army attacked the San Sabá de la Santa Cruz mission on 16 March 1758, killing eight or ten people including two missionaries: mission president Alonso Giraldo de Terreros, and Joseph de Santiesteban. The mission site was burned down. The remaining settlers fled to the fort, where Parrilla and his soldiers defended against the raiders as they attempted to besiege it for several days. In December, a Comanche-led militia armed with muskets attacked and killed a group of Apache men near the presidio, killing 21 of them. Another attack occurred in March 1759 when the same raiders responsible for the massacre one year earlier again struck at San Sabá, killing the 19 men guarding the presidio's herd and stealing 750 horses.

Following the initial siege, Parrilla buried the victims of the massacre and searched the destroyed mission for salvageable materials, noting that, among other things, the mission's effigy of Saint Francis of Assisi had fallen from its pedestal, causing the head to break off from the rest of the bust. Writing to the military leadership in Mexico City, he suggested that missionary work at San Sabá be abandoned so he could lead a campaign against the "Norteños", or "northern tribes". As he did so, Parrilla refused requests from his troops to relocate the presidio to a more secure location. Jacinto de Barrios y Jáuregui, the Governor of Texas, supported the plan. Communication between the fort and Mexico City was difficult due to the long distances and the indecisiveness of authorities in the capital, but Parrilla eventually received formal approval for his operation and began planning his movements on 3 January 1759 at the San Antonio de Béxar Presidio. Although the raids against San Sabá had been led by the Comanche, the decision was made not to seek reprisals against them as their territory was too far away. Instead, he focused on targeting the Tawakoni, Tonkawa, and Wichita nations. Parrilla turned down offers from French officials to negotiate a peace between New Spain and the Indigenous nations opposing the colony.

Parrilla left San Antonio in mid-August with a force composed of 139 Spanish regulars and 241 militiamen; as well as 134 Apache and 30 Tlaxcaltecan troops who resided at the San Sabá Mission. Two priests accompanied the army. The soldiers had been drawn from every presidio in Texas as well as some in northern Mexico. The army was equipped with 1,500 horses, hundreds of mules, two cannons, and four months' worth of provisions largely made up of beans, corn, dry beef, and flour.

As they advanced further north, hunters with the army would venture out in search of bison to kill for food, and scouts repeatedly delayed their advances by confusing the tracks of the hunters for the Native people they were pursuing. On 1 September, they made camp in the ruins of the San Sabá Mission, and remained there until 7 September. The campaign's first engagement with Native forces occurred on 1 October, 150 leagues northeast of San Sabá at the Clear Fork of the Brazos River. The Spanish launched a surprise attack on a Tonkawa village, killing 55 people (including five women and five children) and taking 149 more as prisoners; two Apache soldiers were wounded, and two horses were killed. While looting the village, Parrilla's army was able to recover 100 of the horses stolen from the San Luis Presidio San Luis in March.

==== Battle of the Twin Villages ====
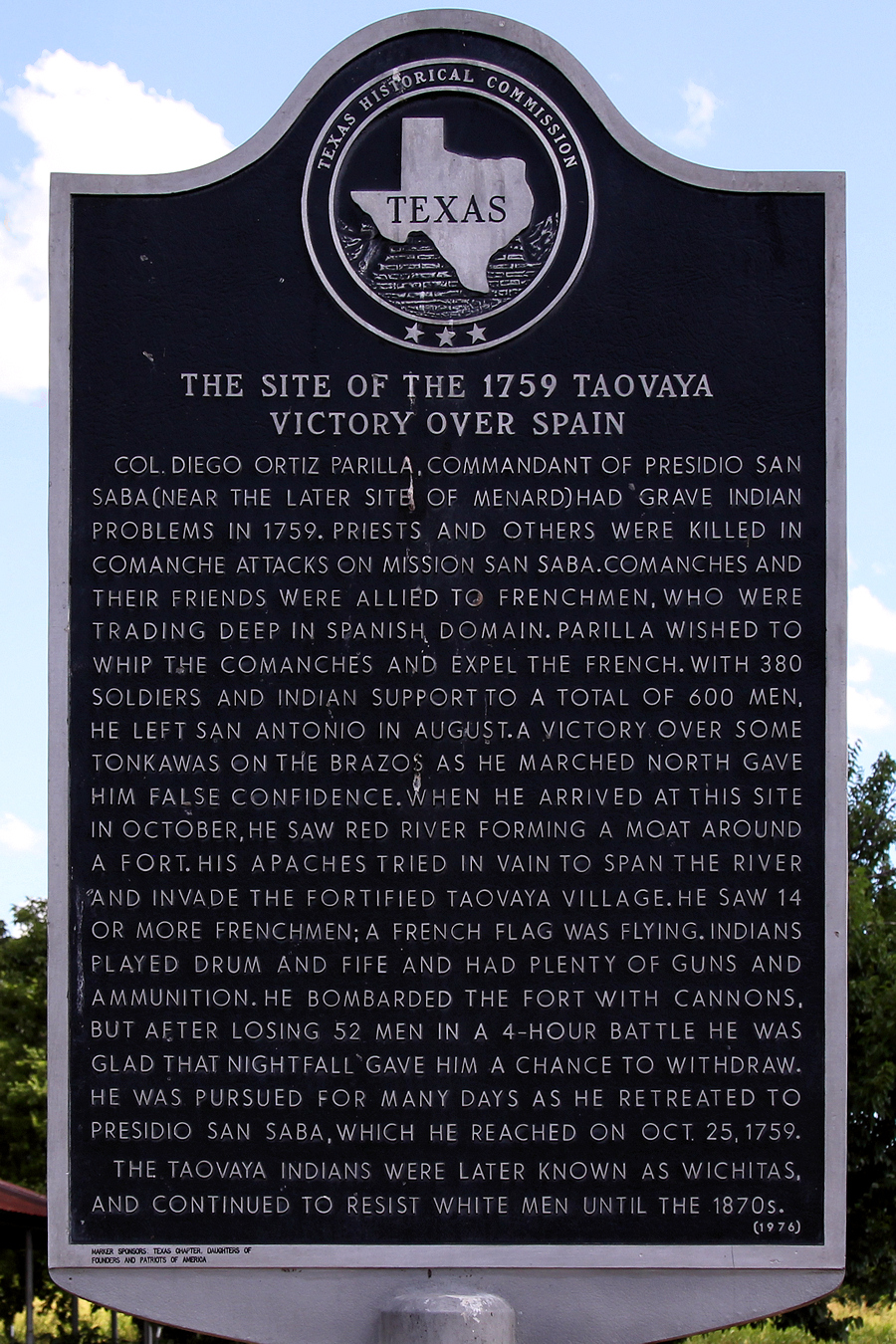
Historical marker in Spanish Fort, Texas commemorating the Battle of the Twin Villages

The most severe fighting in the campaign occurred on 7 October 1759 at the Battle of the Twin Villages, where Parrilla and his men were ambushed near two Taovaya villages, located on either side of the Red River on the site of modern-day Spanish Fort and southern Jefferson County. The army was attacked by 60-70 warriors who charged them from the woods and then retreated. Parrilla ordered his men to pursue their attackers, leading them into the woods and onto a sandbank.

The sandbank was adjacent to the village the Native soldiers had fortified with breastworks, as well as a stockade made of split logs. The stockade encircled half of the village with the other half protected by the river, and a moat protected the wall from any mounted attacks. A large corral had been established within the fortress walls, protecting the civilians inside. According to Parrilla, the defending force was flying a French flag over their fort and was armed with French muskets. Estimations place the number of people defending the fort at 500-6,000. Large fields of beans, maize, pumpkins, and watermelons located upriver from the village supplied them with food.

As they began to sink into the sand, the Spanish withdrew out of musket range to assess the situation. The road away from the site was being defended by men on horseback, also armed with muskets. At some point during the battle, Parrilla was shot in the arm. Their position offered a serious disadvantage to the Europeans, whose horses were sinking knee-deep into the sand. In his report on the battle, Parrilla would describe their enemy as having "the advantage in arms and determination".

Surrounded by gunfire from two angles and with no avenue for retreat, Parrilla organized his troops with Spanish soldiers in the middle and his Native auxiliaries protecting against flanking manoeuvres. The Europeans armed their cannons and fired eleven times at the stockade, but did no damage to it. The mounted fighters would strike at the flanks and the main body of the army repeatedly before pulling back to swap out their firearms for ones that had been reloaded by support units out of range of the Europeans' guns. Gradually, the Spanish were encircled. At least 19 Spanish soldiers deserted, as did most or all of their Native allies. Around nightfall, Parrilla called off the offensive after four hours of fighting failed to overwhelm the Natives and resulted in the deaths of 19 Spanish soldiers and 14 non-fatal casualties, as well as 19 desertions. Under the cover of darkness, he ordered his men to retreat, leaving behind the two cannons and the army's provisions. In his report to military authorities after the battle, Parrilla declared it a success, alleging that he had inflicted at least 100 casualties on their troops and had killed the Taovaya chief, but these details were not verified. The Spanish made camp a short distance from the village, and the next day moved further along the river to a location with better pastures. A full day was spent tending to the wounded.

==== Retreat ====
Parrilla and his army were left without the weapons or supplies necessary to continue their invasion, so they retreated to San Sabá, finally arriving at the presidio on 25 October after 17 days. Conflicting accounts of the retreat either state that the army was pursued the entire way, or that they were not followed at all and reports to the contrary were invented by Parrilla's political enemies.

Parrilla was forced to return defeated, convening a short junta to confirm with his captains that it was best to proceed to San Antonio. The army arrived at the city in November and disbanded; from there, Parrilla requested permission to proceed to the capital and issued his consulta (report) about the battle, which was sent to the viceroy on 18 November 1759. To prove its veracity, Parrilla's report was signed by himself and three witnesses. He finally arrived at Mexico City in the summer of 1760. In his absence, Manuel Rodríguez of the San Juan Bautista Mission was left in command of the San Luis de las Amarillas Presidio. Rather than be allowed to return, Parrilla was reassigned; Felipe de Rábago y Terán, who had commanded the San Xavier Presidio prior to its relocation, was put in charge of the fort.

The weapons lost by Parrilla would not be recovered for twenty years, only returning to Spanish possession in spring 1778 when Athanase de Mézières secured the cannons and transported them to a settlement on the Trinity River, in present-day Madison County. The success of Native troops over Spanish forces in the Red River Campaign was the first in a series of events that led to a reorganization of New Spain's frontier defences following an inspection tour by Cayetano Pignatelli, 3rd Marquis of Rubí in 1767. A tentative peace between the Taovaya people and New Spain would not be formalized until 1772.

Historian Dan L. Thrapp considered the campaign a complete failure and reiterated the opinion of earlier historians who had stated it was "long regarded as a disgrace to Spanish arms", while Robert S. Weddle has suggested the scope of the failure was exaggerated by Parrilla's political opponents. Juan Ángel de Oyarzún, captain of the participating company from San Luis Potosí, kept a journal tracking the course of the campaign which would prove invaluable to historians in later centuries. The exact location of the San Sabá Mission was a mystery until January 1994.

=== Florida and Coahuila ===
Following his defeat at San Sabá, Diego Ortiz Parrilla was reassigned to a presidio in Coahuila: the Presidio de Santa Rosa María del Sacramento. Almost immediately after arriving in Coahuila, Parrilla was reassigned again to quell a Native uprising in Spanish Florida. With a force of 400 soldiers from Veracruz and Havana, Parrilla was made Governor of San Miguel de Pensacola and spent two years suppressing the rebellion. By the time his work was done, Spain had lost the Seven Years' War and ceded Florida to Great Britain. On 2 September 1763, Parrilla handed over Pensacola to Lieutenant Colonel August Prévost of the British Royal American Regiment, a 350-person army unit. He reported to Ambrosio de Funes Villalpando in Havana that the formalities had been taken care of and shortly afterwards sailed to Veracruz with his army, as well as a number of Native people who had pledged their allegiance to Spain.

Parrilla returned to the Presidio de Santa Rosa and became Governor of Coahuila in June 1764, an office he would hold until December 1765. As governor, he authorized a considerable land grant to a former comrade, Antonio Rivas, in what would later become part of Maverick County, Texas.

=== Gulf Coast Expedition ===
Native Malaguita people reported in mid-1765 that European settlers were colonizing the "Islas Blancas" (present-day Padre Island) at the mouth of the Nueces River, an area unexplored by the Spanish but close enough to Florida that it seemed possible British colonists were intruding into the territory. News of the undocumented colonists was received first at the San Bautista Mission and was then passed on to the Santa Rosa Presidio, where Diego Ortiz Parrilla received the reports and forwarded them to Mexico City.

The Viceroy of New Spain, Joaquín de Montserrat, organized an investigation into these claims. He began by sending orders on 2 November to José de Escandón, the Governor of Nuevo Santander, instructing him to collect all of the information he could about the islands. On 16 or 19 April 1766, Montserrat asked Parrilla to directly explore the suspicious area and search for evidence of British incursions. Parrilla, freshly relieved of his governorship, travelled to the San Juan Bautista mission and then to the Estancia de Santa Petronila, where he was joined by 25 soldiers sent by Escandón and commanded by the alférez José Antonio de la Garza Falcón, the son of Blas María de la Garza Falcón. He was also joined by the Malaguita people who had initially reported on the non-Spanish colonists.

On 7 September 1766, Parrilla and his men camped on the Playa de la Bahía de Corpus Christi on the shores of the Laguna Madre, which at that time was known as the "Bahía de Corpus Christi" or "Corpus Christi Bay", so-named by either Garza Falcón or his father. The explorers waited for six days before heavy rain and high winds caused by the Gulf Hurricane of 1766 subsided.

An expedition led by Garza Falcón departed the camp on 13 September for Padre Island, and reported to Parrilla on 24 September that they had explored the entire landmass and found no evidence of European settlement, as well as only sparse ruins of Native inhabitants. However, the island was littered with the remains of sunken ships, including the decaying hulk of a twenty-gun British frigate on Brazos Island which the explorers burned. The expedition had renamed the island "Isla de San Carlos de los Malaguitas", but the name did not become popular. Mateo Martínez, the expedition's pilot, described the geography of the island as surprising as he had never encountered barrier islands before in his travels. Carlos Castañeda, a historian familiar with the region's history, has suggested that Garza Falcón may not have actually set foot on the island during this expedition, instead alleging that while the report to Parrilla was dated "September 1766" the weather conditions would have made reaching the island extremely difficult. Garza Falcón had conducted a preliminary survey of the island already for José de Escandón during his fact-finding mission the previous year, submitting his findings to Escandón in a report dated 18 June 1766.

Parrilla sent the Nuevo Santander soldiers back to Escandón and proceeded with just his own soldiers. Flooding made crossing the mouth of the Nuences River impossible, so he led the expedition 42 leagues upriver and crossed at a bridge, following the road there to Presidio La Bahía and arriving at the fort in early October. Here he interviewed soldiers who had survived the fall of the San Agustin de Ahumada Presidio (present-day San Augustine, Texas), almost entirely destroyed in the hurricane on 4 September. These men and others informed Parrilla that every coastal body of water had been flooded, so he decided not to proceed with any further exploration and spent the remainder of the expedition encamped, working on his map of the coastline. Parrilla was unable to secure an extension for his survey, and so was unable to personally chart the area even after the flooded areas had drained, and ended the mission on 14 October 1766.

The completed map was submitted to Joaquín de Montserrat on 4 May 1767. Parrilla had charted the coastline as far north as Galveston Bay and produced the first detailed maps of Padre Island, as well as other barrier islands along the coast. In a report dated 21 June 1767, he personally deemed his map better than "all those that have come to the courts of Spain and France". However, the map was flawed in the areas he was unable to visit and had reproduced based on second-hand information. As a result of a miscommunication, Parrilla had applied the name "Corpus Christi Bay" only to a small bay off the Laguna Madre, whereas prior to his expedition the entire body of water between Padre Island and the mainland had been known by that name. Although he misunderstood which body of water "Corpus Christi" was meant to be attributed to and had drawn the bay in an incorrect location, the name was upheld by subsequent expeditions and the area has been known as that ever since.

No evidence of a foreign invasion was discovered by Parrilla or his men. In his final report to the viceroy, Parrilla said of Isla Blanca:

The entire island is low and arid, without permanent waterholes or signs that it has ever been inhabited, although on the southern part were found some rancherías of the indios gentiles who at times inhabit them.

Before Parrilla could return to the Santa Rosa Presidio, the fort was visited by Cayetano Pignatelli, the Marquis of Rubí on 1 July 1767. The Marquis had been sent to survey the presidios on the northern frontier of New Spain to map their locations and assess their defensive capabilities, a mission that had also taken him to the ruins of the San Sabá Presidio. Pignatelli was insulted by the absence of the fort's captain until the viceroy informed him of Parrilla's mission.

Parrilla's map also included a few other notable features:

- Several structures erected by Copane, Karankawa, Malaguita, Manos de Perro, Pascanus, Patrine, and Piguique people are recorded on the northern barrier islands and southern Padre Island.
- Brazos Island and Mustang Island are reproduced accurately.
- The mouth of the Nuences River is not connected to Corpus Christi Bay.
- Baffin Bay and Galveston Island are completely absent.
- Matagorda Island is depicted as a peninsula to the west of San Antonio Bay.
- The Matagorda Peninsula is depicted as an island and called "Ysla de la Culebra."
- The Arroyo Colorado is called the "Arroyo de San Miguel."
- Galveston Bay is called "San Bernardo Bay." The bay would not be named for Bernardo de Gálvez until 1785
- Padre Island is called "Ysla de San Carlos de los Malaguitas", a variant on the name given to it by José Antonio de la Garza Falcón.
- Copano Bay is called "Bahía de Santo Domingo" and contains a small phantom island.
- San José Island is called "Ysla de Santo Domingo."
- Matagorda Bay is mislabelled as Bahía del Espíritu Santo.
- Trinity Bay is mislabelled as "San Antonio Bay."

=== Later years ===
Eleven years after he had initially been granted approval to return to Spain, Parrilla was again given permission to go home and claim his father's estate in December 1767, on the condition that he find a competent commander to take over for him in the meantime. It is unknown if he returned to Spain at this time. By 1769, he had been reassigned to San Antonio to prepare another campaign against the Native peoples, though whether or not he actually led any further actions is uncertain.

On 11 September 1774, Parrilla submitted a request to be reassigned to a post in Spain, asking for one "at the Plaza de Valencia or some other". On 1 October, Viceroy Antonio María de Bucareli was informed that Parrilla was being reassigned to Valencia. He had arrived in Madrid by 16 November, but unfortunately for Parrilla his time in the home country was short by his death in November 1775.

== See also ==
- Military of New Spain
