= Battle of the Twin Villages =

- Spanish Fort, Texas
- U.S. National Register of Historic Places
- No. 369976
- Location of the Battle of the Twin Villages in Texas or Oklahoma
- Location: Montague County, Texas
- Nearest city: Nocona, Texas
- Coordinates: 33°57′7.2318″N 97°37′36.0948″W
- Area: 100 acres (40 ha)
- Built: 1759
- NRHP reference No.: 75002000
- No.: 369976

Significant dates
- Significant Event: 1759
- Added to NRHP: April 14, 1975
- Designated: April 14, 1975

The Battle of the Two Villages was a Spanish attack on Taovaya villages in what is now Texas and Oklahoma by a Spanish army in 1759. The Spanish were defeated by the Taovaya and other Wichita tribes with assistance from the Comanche.

== Background ==
The San Saba Mission was established in April 1757 near the site of present-day Menard, Texas. Three miles away, a military post, Presidio San Luis de las Amarillas, was established at the same time to protect the Mission. The purpose of the Mission was to convert and pacify the Lipan Apache and extend Spanish influence into the Great Plains. The Spanish also wished to check the increase of French influence among the natives on their northern frontier.

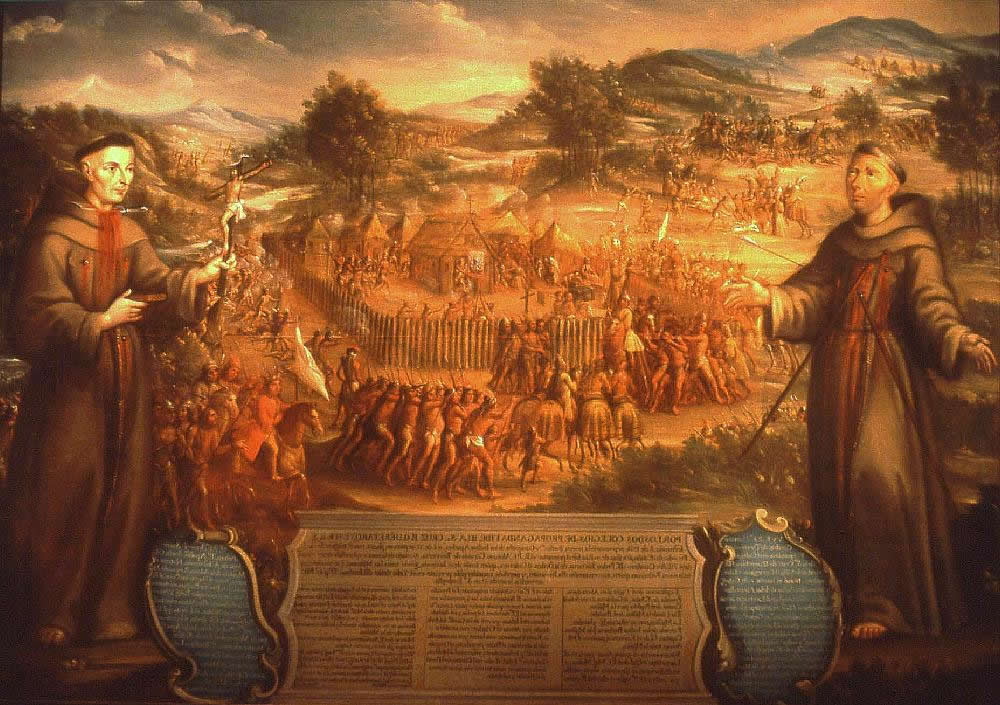
The destruction of the San Saba mission is depicted in the earliest extant painting of an event in Texas history.

The establishment of the Mission inflamed the people of northern Texas, called "Norteños" by the Spanish. The Norteños included the nomadic Comanche, the village-dwelling Wichita tribes, (the Taovaya, Iscani, and Wichita proper), and Tonkawan tribes. On March 16, 1758, a Wichita army, described as numbering 2,000 men, destroyed the San Saba Mission, killing two Franciscan priests and several Christian native assistants. The nearby Presidio, staffed by fewer than 100 soldiers, was too weak to attempt to protect the Mission. Raids continued near the Presidio. In December, Comanche killed 21 Apache and, in March 1759, another 18 men guarding the Presidio's horse herd.

The Commander of the San Luis Presidio, Diego Ortiz Parrilla, an experienced soldier and fighter, organized a punitive mission against the Norteños, especially the Wichita. The force he slowly assembled consisted of two cannons, 1,600 horses, mules, and cattle, and 636 men: 139 Spanish soldiers, 241 militiamen, 134 Apache, 30 Tlaxcala, 90 Christian Mission natives, and two priests. The soldiers and the Tlaxcalans were armed with muskets and swords; the natives mostly with bows and arrows. In August 1759, this unwieldy and mostly untrained force set forth northward from San Antonio. Ortiz Parrilla had supplies for a four-month expedition.

== The tribes ==
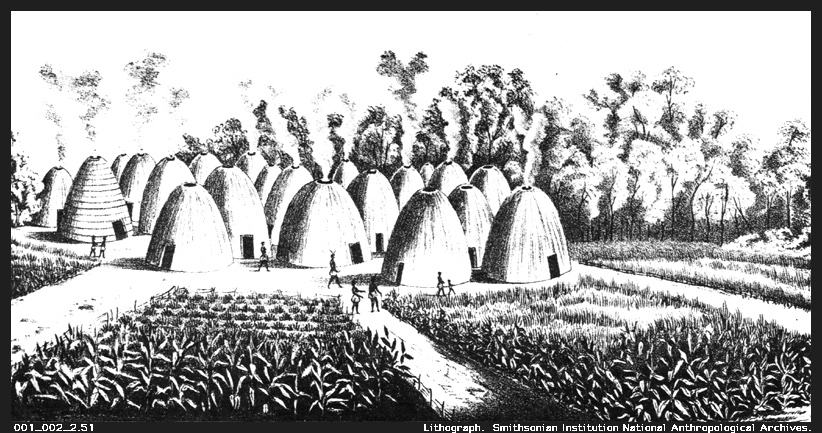
The Wichita were farmers who lived in beehive-shaped houses thatched with grass and surrounded by extensive maize fields. They were skilled farmers who traded agricultural products to nomadic tribes in exchange for meat.

The Wichita had only recently migrated south from their traditional homeland of Kansas and northern Oklahoma. Their migration was prompted by pressure from the Osage expanding onto the Great Plains. In the early 1750s, the Taovaya, the most important of the several Wichita tribes, had established large twin villages on the north side of Red River in Jefferson County, Oklahoma and on the south side at Spanish Fort, Texas. The Wichita had trade contacts with the French, and in 1746 a French-brokered alliance with the Comanche contributed to their prosperity. The village at Spanish Fort became "a lively emporium where Comanches brought Apache slaves, horses and mules to trade for French packs of powder, balls, knives, and textiles and for Taovaya-grown maize, melons, pumpkins, squash, and tobacco." The Taovaya villages were the objective of the Spanish army.

The Comanche were also migrating south toward the Spanish settlements in Texas and driving the Apache before them. They were among the first North American natives to acquire the horse from the Spanish and to create the nomadic, equestrian culture that would typify the Plains tribes. The Comanche were numerous, although divided into several independent bands. They were in the process of establishing suzerainty over a large area of the southern Great Plains with allies such as the Wichita.

The Tonkawa consisted of a number of independent tribes that spoke similar languages. They lived in central and northern Texas. Other tribes identified as participating in Norteño raids were Bidai, Tejas (Hasinai), and Yojuanes. The various tribes making up the people the Spanish called Norteños were united only in that they shared a common enemy, the Apache, and a concern that a Spanish-Apache alliance would be detrimental to their interests.

== The battle ==
The first problem of the Spanish expedition was finding the Norteños. On October 2, Ortiz Parrilla found a Yojuane village, probably along the Clear Fork of the Brazos River near present-day Graham, Texas. Attacking the village, the Spanish killed 49 Yojuanes and captured 149. Some of the captive Yojuanes offered to guide Ortiz Parilla north to a large Taovaya and Iscani village.

On October 7, about 60 or 70 natives attacked the Spanish. The Spanish formed up in line of battle and dispersed the small force, pursuing them through the woods to the banks of a river, undoubtedly the Red. The Spanish were surprised to find there a moated fort flying a French flag. Inside the palisaded wall were the distinctive bee-hive shaped houses of the Wichita. The inhabitants of houses outside the palisade fled to the fort for shelter. Upstream were large fields of maize, pumpkins, beans, and watermelons. Downstream was a ford across the river, guarded by warriors. The Spanish could also see Comanche tipis scattered around the periphery of the village.

Spanish estimates of the numbers of the natives they faced ranged up to 6,000, including 500 cavalry, although Ortiz Parrilla estimated only that they numbered at least as many as his force of 600. He deployed the Tlaxcalans and Mission forces on the right, the Spanish in the center, and the Apache on the left. His plan was to advance on and storm the fortress, supported by his two cannon. The natives, however, menaced his flanks, and sallied from the fort in repeated assaults on the Spanish lines. Each warrior on horseback had two men on foot supporting him, each carrying two additional loaded muskets. Native scouts reported that 14 Frenchmen were inside the fortress helping direct the fighting.

The battle lasted four hours. The Spanish were unable to approach the palisaded village. The eleven volleys of cannon fire they directed at the palisade were ineffective. The fighting ceased at nightfall and the Spanish reassessed their situation. The natives had captured their two cannons, 19 men in the Spanish army, mostly Spaniards, were dead and 14 were wounded. A number of men had deserted. The priests and officers petitioned Ortiz Parrilla to abandon the fight. Next morning, he ordered a return to San Saba which the Spanish force and their Yojuane captives reached on October 25. The Spanish estimated that they had killed 100 natives in the battle, probably a large over-estimation.

Battle of the Twin Villages
- Part of Comanche Wars
Date	October 2-7, 1759
Location	Near the Texas-Oklahoma border
Result	Native American victory

Belligerents
Comanche, Taovaya, Yojuane, France	Spanish Empire

Commanders and leaders
unknown	Diego Ortiz Parrilla

Strength
600-6,000	~600

Casualties and losses
0	19 killed, 14 wounded

== Aftermath ==
The Yojuane captives were sold into slavery and the group soon disappeared from history, the survivors being absorbed by the Tonkawa. Neither the Spanish nor the Norteños followed up the battle with any serious military action. The Wichita tribes later sought peace with the Spanish and refrained from further raids. In 1767, the Spanish abandoned the San Saba mission and their efforts to Christianize the Apache. The Spanish peace with the Apache soon broke down and Apache and Comanche raiders continued to be a serious threat on the northern frontier of Spanish settlements.

It is uncertain whether the battle took place on the Texas or the Oklahoma side of the Red River. The traces of the village remaining on the Oklahoma side of the border are now called the Longest archaeological site.

== See also ==
- Spanish Fort, Texas
