= San Sabá fight (1831) =

Part of the Texas–Indian wars in 1831

- Part of the Texas–Indian wars
Date	November 21, 1831
Location	near the Mission Santa Cruz de San Saba, Mexican Texas
Result	American victory

Belligerents
American prospectors	Indian raiders

Strength
11	164

Casualties and losses
1 killed, 3 wounded 5 horses killed, 3 wounded	82 killed and wounded

The San Sabá fight was an armed encounter between a heavily outnumbered group of American prospectors led by James Bowie and a band of Tawakoni, Waco and Caddo Indians, which took place on the San Saba River in Mexican Texas, on November 21, 1831.

== Background ==
Shortly after settling and marrying in Mexican Texas with an eye to business, James "Jim" Bowie became fascinated with the local story of the long abandoned and lost silver mines of Los Almagres, said to be northwest of San Antonio, near the ruin of the Spanish Mission Santa Cruz de San Saba. According to legend, the mine had been operated by local Indians before being seized by the Spanish. After Mexico won independence from Spain, government interest in mining waned. A number of native groups roamed the area, including Comanche, Lipan Apache, Tawakoni, and Tonkawa. Without government troops to keep hostile natives at bay, mining and mineral exploration were impossible. Some believed that the Lipan had taken over the mine after the Mexican citizens left the area. The Indians apparently wished to prevent another influx of miners and adventurers into their hunting grounds — a condition that brought about the fate of the San Saba Mission, when its inmates, the miners, and people there congregated, were displaced by Indians in 1758.

== The fight ==
After obtaining permission from the Mexican government to mount an expedition into Indian territory to locate and re-open the silver mines, Bowie, his brother Rezin, and ten others set out for San Saba on November 2, 1831. Organized, equipped and led by the Bowie brothers, the exploring party consisted of Rezin P. and James Bowie, David Buchanan, Robert Armstrong, Jesse Wallace, Matthew Doyle, Thomas McCaslin, C. K. Ham, James Coryell (for whom Coryell county was named), and two servant boys, Charles, a black, and Gonzales, a Mexican.

Six miles (10 km) from their goal, the group stopped to negotiate with a large raiding party—reportedly more than 120 Tawakoni and Waco, plus another 40 Caddo. The attempts at parley failed, and Bowie and his group fought for their lives for the next 13 hours. When the raiding party finally retreated, Bowie reportedly had lost only one man, while more than 40 Indians had been killed and 30 were wounded. In the meantime, a party of friendly Comanche rode into San Antonio bringing word of the raiding party, which outnumbered the Bowie expedition by 14 to 1. The citizens of San Antonio believed the members of the Bowie expedition must have perished, and Ursula Bowie began wearing widow's weeds.

== Aftermath ==
To the town's surprise, the surviving members of the group returned to San Antonio on December 6. James Bowie's report of the expedition, written in Spanish, was printed in several newspapers, further establishing his reputation. He set out again the following month, with a larger force, but returned home empty-handed after 2 1/2 months of searching. In 1832 another, better known account of the encounter was published in a Philadelphia paper by Rezin Bowie.

== Sources ==
- Brown, John Henry (1893). History of Texas, from 1685 to 1892. Vol. 1. St. Louis: L. E. Daniell. pp. 170–175.
- Dasso, Tim (November 6, 2017). "The Other Bowie's Epic Battle". True West Magazine.
- De Shields, James T. (1912). Border Wars of Texas. Tioga, TX: The Herald Company. pp. 76–83.
- Edmondson, J. R. (2000). The Alamo Story-From History to Current Conflicts. Plano, TX: Republic of Texas Press. ISBN 1-55622-678-0.
- Hopewell, Clifford (1994). James Bowie, Texas Fighting Man: A Biography. Austin, TX: Eakin Press. pp. 61–62, 72–74, 91. ISBN 0-89015-881-9.
- Kennedy, William (1841). Texas: The Rise, Progress, and Prospects of the Republic of Texas. Vol. 2. London: R. Hastings. pp. 122–128.
- Peatfield, Joseph Joshua; Hubert Howe Bancroft; Henry Lebbeus Oak; William Nemos (1889). History of the North Mexican States. A. L. Bancroft and Company.
- Williamson, William R. (March 24, 2017) [1952]. "Bowie, James (1796–1836)". Handbook of Texas (online ed.).
