= Juan Galván =

Spanish soldier, explorer

- Occupations: explorer and soldier

Juan Galván was a Spanish soldier and explorer who served as an ensign and explorer in San Antonio, Texas. It was on his recommendation that the Presidio San Saba was established.

== Biography ==
Galván settled in San Antonio of Bexar early in the 1720s, about ten years after entering military service. He did well there, being promoted to alférez and later entrusted with 30 men on March 13, 1748, to protect the Mission San Xavier del Bac. He reported back that manpower would be sufficient for the native threat and recommended that presidio be established with a force of 50. In the summer of 1749, Governor Pedro del Barrio Junco y Espriella went with Galván to investigate whether San Xavier could sustain a settlement. After their expedition, he placed Galvan in command of the presidio at San Xavier.

In 1752, Spanish authorities approved an expedition to explore the Apache territory and locate a site for a possible mission. Galván was given charge of this expedition and set out the following year with a small group, including Father Miguel de Aranda, who worked at Mission Concepcion. They travelled northwest of San Antonio, exploring the Pedernales River, the Llano River, and the San Saba River. The San Saba River area appeared most promising as the soil was fertile, there seemed to be mineral deposits in the area, and local Apache promised to come to a mission. Galvan recommended that a mission be founded along the San Saba, and that a presidio be established nearby to protect the mission against the Comanche. That he recommended a staff of 100 soldiers at the presidio was cause for concern that the region might be too dangerous; it took three more years and two more missions with similar findings before the governor agreed and the mission and Presidio San Saba was established. Apaches never embraced the mission, and eventually several of the missionaries abandoned it, but Galván served as lieutenant at the Presidio.

== Personal life ==
Juan Galvan married Francisca Xaviera Maldonado in San Antonio, in 1723. They had ten children.

== Sources ==
- Chipman, Donald E. (1992), Spanish Texas, 1519–1821, Austin, TX: University of Texas Press, ISBN 0-292-77659-4
- Minor, Nancy McGown (5 October 2009). Turning Adversity to Advantage: A History of the Lipan Apaches of Texas and Northern Mexico, 1700-1900. University Press of America. ISBN 978-0-7618-4859-2.
- Weddle, Robert S.; Juan Ángel de Oyarzún (2007). After the Massacre: The Violent Legacy of the San Sabá Mission. Texas Tech University Press. ISBN 978-0-89672-596-6.
