= Pedro de Rábago y Terán =

Spanish administrator and military officer

Don Pedro de Rábago y Terán (died 1756) was a Spanish administrator and military officer in New Spain. He was governor of Coahuila from August 1744 to June 1754. In 1754, Don Pedro de Rábago y Terán was sent by the viceroy of New Spain to find a site for an Apache Mission, named a pass between the hills in Menard County overlooking the San Saba River as Puerto de Baluartes (Port of Bulwarks). The Santa Cruz de San Sabá Mission was established three years later on the San Saba River near Menard, Texas. As an explorer in the late 1740s he went on three expeditions to the confluence of the Rio Grande and the Rio Conchos, known as La Junta de los Rios, in order to establish a presidio or military camp to serve six missions in the area of La Junta, which were being attacked by the Apache. He recommended a site that became the Presidio de la Junta de los Ríos Norte y Conchos near what is now Presidio, Texas.

As his term as governor of Coahuila expired he was appointed captain of the Presidio del Santísimo Sacramento del Valle de Santa Rosa, where he dealt with problems at the San Xavier missions near present-day Rockdale, Texas that had been exacerbated by his nephew Felipe de Rábago y Terán. Rábago y Terán explored the area around the Llano and San Saba rivers. Relocating the San Xavier missions to the San Marcos River, he became ill in an epidemic at the missions and died in early 1756. Pedro de Rábago y Terán, commander of the San Xavier Presidio, was sent to explore the San Saba River country in 1754 to look for suitable locations for a presidio-mission complex. After his return to San Xavier he urged removal of the San Xavier complex to the San Saba River. The mission was moved temporarily to the San Marcos River near San Antonio and Rábago died soon afterward. Diego Ortiz Parrilla, named to succeed Rábago y Terán, received instructions on September 1, 1756, to transfer the San Xavier garrison to the San Saba River and to recruit an additional fifty men in San Antonio and the Mexican provinces. The San Sabá presidio thus became the largest in Texas. While a jurisdictional question was being debated over whether the mission lay within the boundaries of Texas or Coahuila, the new post remained under the viceroy. The matter was finally settled in favor of Texas.
