= José de Páez =

Mexican painter (1720–1790)

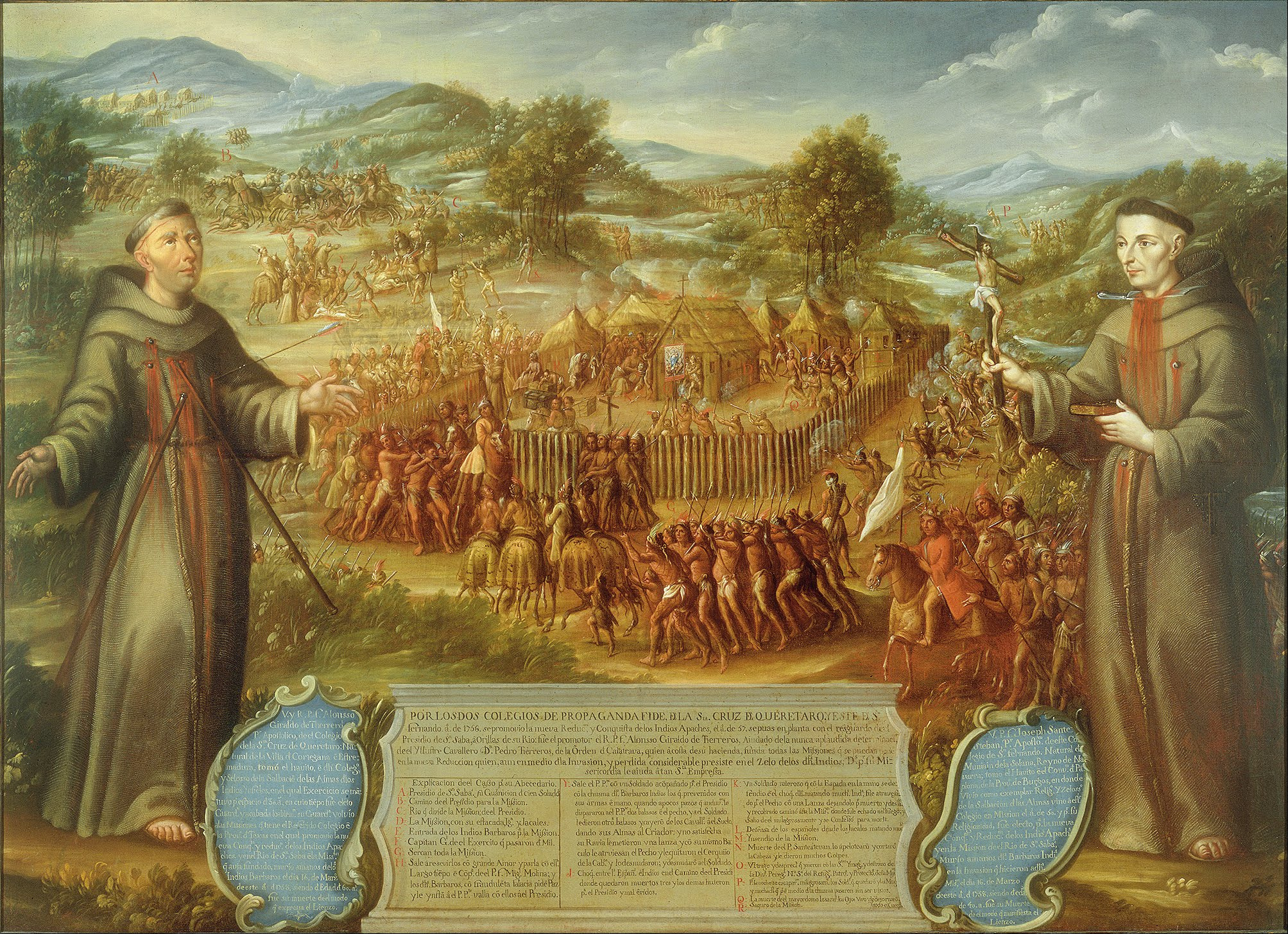
The destruction of the mission of San Sabá in the province of Texas, ca. 1765.

José de Páez (1720–1790) was a Mexican painter of religious images, a history painting of the destruction of Mission Santa Cruz de San Sabá in Texas, and a set of casta paintings in the 18th century. He was of Baltazar de Páez, José is identified student of Nicolás Enríquez. He married Rosalía Caballero in 1753.

t full-length work on casta paintings. A third set is in a private collection in Monterrey, Mexico, but shown in San Antonio, Texas as part of an exhibition commemorating the 1718 founding of the settlement. It was published in an earlier exhibition catalogue. The set is typical of the genre, showing racial mixture in hierarchical order. White (Español) – Amerindian mixtures show a return to white status over generations of marriages to whites: Español e India, produce Mestizo; De Español y Mestiza, produce Castizo; De Español y Castiza, produce Español. He then includes an indigenous – Mestizo mixture, with the offspring three-quarters Indio, which is a step down in the racial hierarchy. De Indio, y Mestizo, produce Coyote. The next register is European white – black African mixtures: De Español, y Negra, produce Mulato; De Español, y Mulata produce Morisca; De Español y Morisca, produce Albino; De Español y Albina, produce Torna atrás, a dark "throw back" from very white appearing parents. In the register of Indio – African mixtures, his set is typical in the array of terms that are not standardized in the genre. De Negro, e India, produce Loba; De Lobo e India, produce Chino Cambujo; De Cambujo, e India, produce Sambaigo; De Sambaigo, y Mulata, produce Calpamulata; De Calpamulato, y Coyota, produce Barcina; De Barcino, y Mulata, produced Chino Alvarazado; De Alvarazado, y Torna atrás, produce Tente en el Ayre.

Páez was a favorite painter of the Franciscans. He painted a series on Saint Francis Solanus in the church of San Fernando in Mexico City. He was commissioned to paint the graphic destruction of the Franciscan mission in Texas of San Sabá shows the martyrdom of two Franciscan friars, Fray Alonso Giraldo de Terreros and Fray José de Santiesteban, and the Comanche warriors who wreaked the damage. It is the earliest known painting depicting a scene from the northern region of Texas. The Count of Regla, Don Pedro Romero de Terreros, member of the Order of Calatrava, and a cousin of Fray Alonso, commissioned the oil painting, completed around 1765. Art historian Pedro Ángeles Jiménez's interprets the painting saying it "renders time as if suspended, a sort of setting in which the artist accommodated the episodes of the story, which are only activated when the spectator scrutinizes the order of the inscriptions." The inscriptions are as follows:

A. Presidio of San Sabá and its garrison of one hundred soldiers;
B. Road from the presidio to the mission;
C. River that divides the mission from the presidio;
D. The mission with its fortification, church, and huts;
E. Arrival of the barbarous Indians [sic] at the mission;
F. Captain General of the army of more than a thousand;
G. They come closer to the mission;
H. Franciscan father Miguel de Molina comes out to meet them and they talk for a long time; the barbarous Indians ask for peace and urge Fr. Molina to accompany them to the presidio;
I. Accompanied by a soldier, Fr. Molina leaves for the presidio; the barbarous Indiains shot them twice in the chest, pierced Molina's chest with a spear and scalped him, then stripped both men;
J. Clash between the Spanish and the Indians along the road from the presidio, resulting in three deaths and flight back to the presidio and many wounded;
K. A brave soldier, with sword in hand, killed many Indians, was pierced through the chest with a spear, and left for dead. He walked to the mission where he was thrown into the fire from which he miraculously escaped and said confession before he died;
L. Defense by the Spanish in their huts killing man [Indians];
M. Burning of the mission;
N. The death of Padre Santiesteban. He was scalped, decapitated, and clubbed many times;
O. Outrage and contempt that they expressed toward the Holy Images and the destruction of the Image of our Lady of Reguge, patron and protector of this mission;
P. The miraculous escape during the night of soldiers, women, and children who disappeared in the crowd without being seen;
Q. Death of the Administrator of the mission, whose eyes were cut out while he was alive and whose flesh was removed from his body;
R. Plunder of the mission.

Under the depictions of the two martyred friars are descriptions in the blue medallions with their biographies.

== Gallery ==
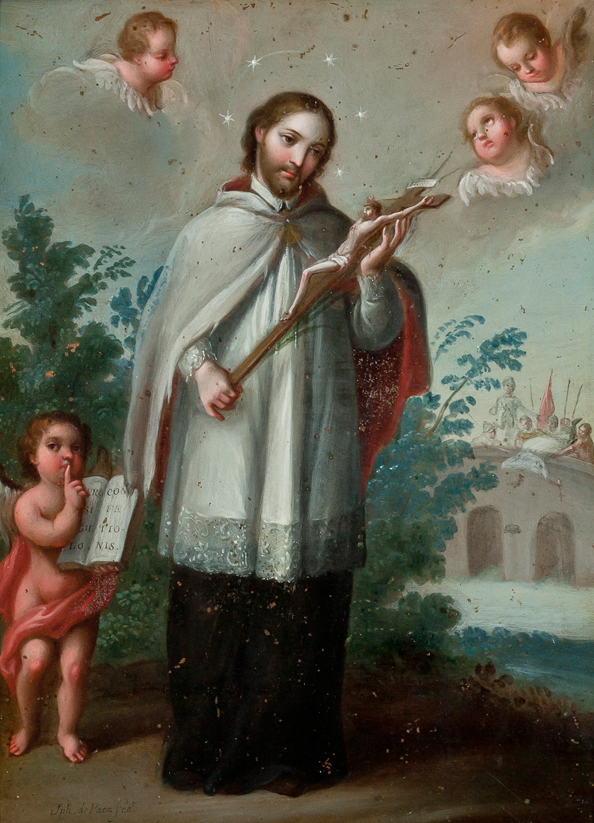
San Juan Nepomuceno. Oil on copper. Art Museum of San Antonio

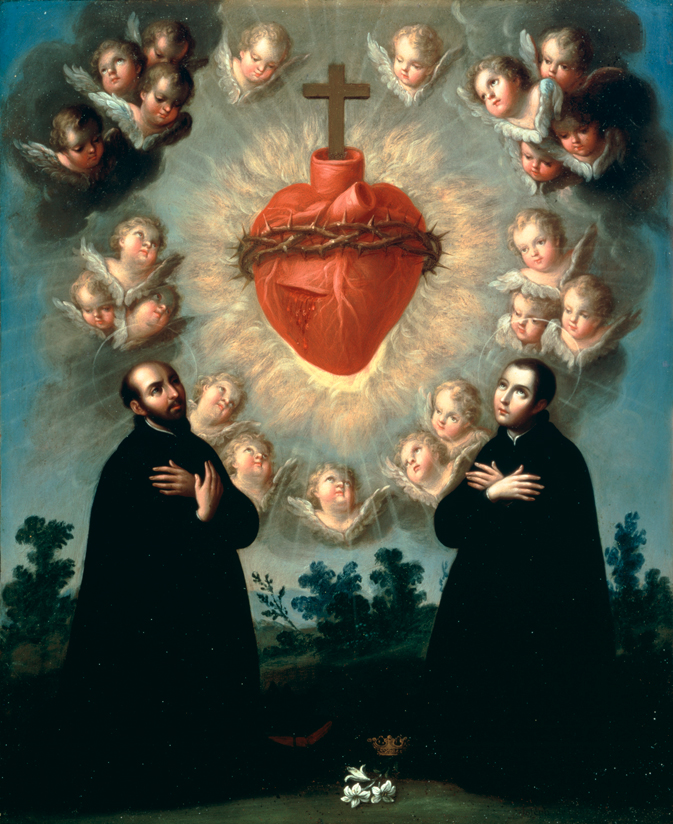
Holy heart with saint Ignacio de Loyola and Saint Luis Gonzaga. Oil on copper ca. 1770

== See also ==
- Casta painting
- Mexican art
