= Marqués de Rubí =

Spanish nobleman

Cayetano Maria Pignatelli Rubí Corbera y San Climent (c. 1725 - 1795 or 1796) was a Spanish nobleman. Rubí was commissioned by the King Charles III of Spain to inspect the presidios on the northern frontier of New Spain (present day Mexico, New Mexico, and Texas) and make recommendations to improve defense against raids by Indian tribes, especially the Apache. From 1766 to 1768, Rubí visited 23 (of 24) presidios scattered from the Gulf of California to present-day Louisiana, traveling overland about 7,600 miles (12,200 km) in 23 months. He wrote a report on his travels which is a valuable source of information about conditions on New Spain's northern frontier. His recommendations, later implemented, were that Spain withdraw from some presidios on its far northern frontier, including Louisiana and eastern Texas, and strengthen others which were in a poor state of readiness. He recommended that San Antonio replace Los Adaes as the capital of Spanish Texas. To combat the Indian threat, he recommended an offensive war against the Apaches and an alliance with the Comanche to subdue the Apache.

== Early life ==
Rubí was probably born in Barcelona. His father was Francisco Pignatelli y de Aymerich, a lieutenant general of the Kingdom of Aragon and ambassador to France. His mother was María Francisca Rubí Corbera y Saint Climent, 2nd Marchioness of Rubí and Baronessa of Llinas. Rubí became a field marshal and knight commander in the Order of Alcántara.

== Background ==
The Treaty of Fontainebleau (1762) ceded all French lands west of the Mississippi River to Spain. French territories east of the Mississippi were transferred to Great Britain. After the treaty, competition of the Spanish Empire with France in Texas and Louisiana ceased to be a problem for Spain, although the numerous British colonists were advancing westward toward Spanish territories. King Carlos III of Spain began to focus on countering Britain and reforming and gaining control of its American colonies which it had neglected during the Seven Years' War that led up to the Treaty of Paris. Carlos made two appointments directed at getting better control and deceasing the costs of administering and defending New Spain (Mexico). He appointed José de Gálvez to reorganize the administration and finances of New Spain and the Marques of Rubí to inspect the frontier defenses of northern New Spain, consisting of 24 presidios from the Gulf of California to eastern Texas and Louisiana, a distance of more than 1,000 miles (1,600 km).

== Inspection tour ==
Rubí arrived at Veracruz on 1 November 1764, as part of the expedition of Juan de Villalba, who was sent to New Spain to organize regular army and colonial militia units. On August 7, 1765, King Charles III appointed Rubí inspector of frontier presidios and commissioned him to remedy economic abuses and other urgent matters. When notified of his commission, Rubí went to Mexico City in mid-December 1765 and remained in the capital until March 1766, when he received his instructions from Viceroy Cruillas. Royal engineer Nicolás de Lafora and cartographer José de Urrutia accompanied him and assisted Rubi by drawing plans of presidios and drafting maps of the area traversed. Lafora said the mission was to learn why Indians "are so audacious" and Spanish soldiers "of so little use." The raiders were mostly Apache who lived near the present U.S. border with Mexico in Arizona, New Mexico, and Texas and Comanche who lived on the Great Plains and raided New Mexico and Texas.

On March 12, 1766, Rubí set out on his inspection, traveling first to Querétaro and then to Zacatecas. On April 14 he was joined at Durango by Lafora, who kept a diary of the tour, as did Rubí himself. Rubí first inspected the presidio at El Paso where he concluded that a presidio was unnecessary as the local militias could handle the defense of the area. Moving north to Santa Fe in New Mexico he found a region in a "never-ceasing war...with the barbarians." He then travel west to Sonora inspecting presidios there, including the presidio at Tubac, near Tucson, Arizona. Only about 600 Spaniards lived in Arizona. Apaches had devastated this region. Turning eastward to Coahuila he noted a population there of 777 families of Spaniards, mestizos, and mulattos including soldiers at the three presidios. Traveling northward to Texas, he crossed the Rio Grande in July 1767 and proceeded to San Luis de las Amarillas Presidio (San Sabá), arriving on August 4. He found the presidio, staffed by 100 soldiers, useless to protect against raids by the Comanche. The presidio at San Antonio with the Spanish population and the 800 Indians at five Spanish missions nearby was also beleaguered and in danger of being abandoned. From San Antonio, Rubí traveled eastward to Los Adaes in present day Louisiana and began his inspection there on September 14. Subsequently, he also inspected the presidios at El Orcoquisac and La Bahía before leaving Texas at Laredo in November 1767. Rubí, Lafora, and Urrutia arrived back in Mexico City on February 23, 1768 after a journey of 23 months and an overland distance Rubí calculated as 2,844 leagues. Lafora calculated they had traveled 2,936 leagues. Both estimates are more than 7,600 miles (12,200 km). They had inspected 23 of the 24 Spanish presidios in northern Mexico and the present day states of Arizona, New Mexico, and Texas.

=== Observations and recommendations ===
Rubí's inspection revealed a desperate state of affairs among the settlements in northern New Spain. Munitions and manpower were in very short supply, problematic for a region under the constant threat of Apache raids. He arrived in Santa Fe to find the settlers dependent on bows and arrows for defense, and the garrison at Los Adaes in Texas was not much better off, having just two muskets for 61 men. At the San Sabá mission, conditions had deteriorated so much that Rubí ordered the abandonment of the settlement, declaring it indefensible.

Rubí advocated retrenchment rather than expansion of Spain's military commitment on its northern border. Spain should only aim to control the land it occupied. As a result of his inspection, Rubí recommended that Spain close seven presidios and reorganize its frontier defenses with a cordon of fifteen presidios, each about 100 miles apart, that would stretch from the Gulf of California to the mouth of the Guadalupe River in Texas. He recommended that each of the presidios have a complement of 43 soldiers and that arming and management of the presidios be improved from the chaotic and inefficient situation prevailing. North of this "real" frontier, which approximated the present international boundary between the United States and Mexico, Rubí advised that presidios be maintained only in San Antonio and Santa Fe. Each was to have 76 soldiers, a larger complement than the other presidios. Rubí urged the abandonment of eastern Texas, including the closing of Los Adaes. Finally, Rubí recommended an offensive war to eliminate the threat of the Apache, including the capture of their women and children so they could not reproduce. He advocated an alliance with the Comanche and other "Norteño" tribes to help defeat the Apache.

Four years passed before a royal order, known as the New Regulations for Presidios, implemented the Rubí recommendations, The order was published on September 10, 1772. The New Regulations called for the designation of an inspector in chief who would command the frontier army. Lt. Col. Hugo Oconór was the first inspector in chief. San Antonio became the new capital of Texas, the former capital of Las Adaes was abandoned and its 500 settlers moved to San Antonio. (although some Spanish settlers would return to east Texas in 1774). The Indian policy advocated by Rubí was not immediately successful. Violence from Apaches and Comanches on New Spain's frontier increased. In the 1770s, at least 243 Spanish settlers were killed in New Mexico out of a total Spanish population of 10,000 which was declining because of Indian raids. Rubí's recommendation of an alliance with the Comanche to combat the Apache finally became a reality in 1785 and 1786 when Texas and New Mexico concluded durable peace agreements with the Comanche.

Rubí's recommendations and their implementation proved to be inadequate. Apache raids continued until 1886. Peace with the Comanche broke down with Mexican independence from Spain in 1821 and Comanche raids devastated northern Mexico from the 1830s to the 1850s.

== Later life ==
Rubí left Veracruz in July 1768 and sailed back to Spain. In Spain he fulfilled several tasks for the Spanish military. In 1788 he was appointed by Carlos III to be Ambassador to Prussia. He refused the assignment, resigned all his duties, and anticipated punishment by the King. However, he was pardoned a year later by Carlos IV. In 1795, he was appointed as capitán general of the Spanish army in Andalucia. He died either in 1795 or 1796.

Spanish nobility
Preceded by María Francisca Rubí	Marquis of Rubí; 1725–c.1795	Succeeded by Marianna Pignatelli
Preceded by María Francisca Rubí	Baron of Llinars; 1725–c.1795	Succeeded by Marianna Pignatelli
