= San Saba River =

River in Texas, United States

Coordinates: 31°15′12″N 98°35′44″W

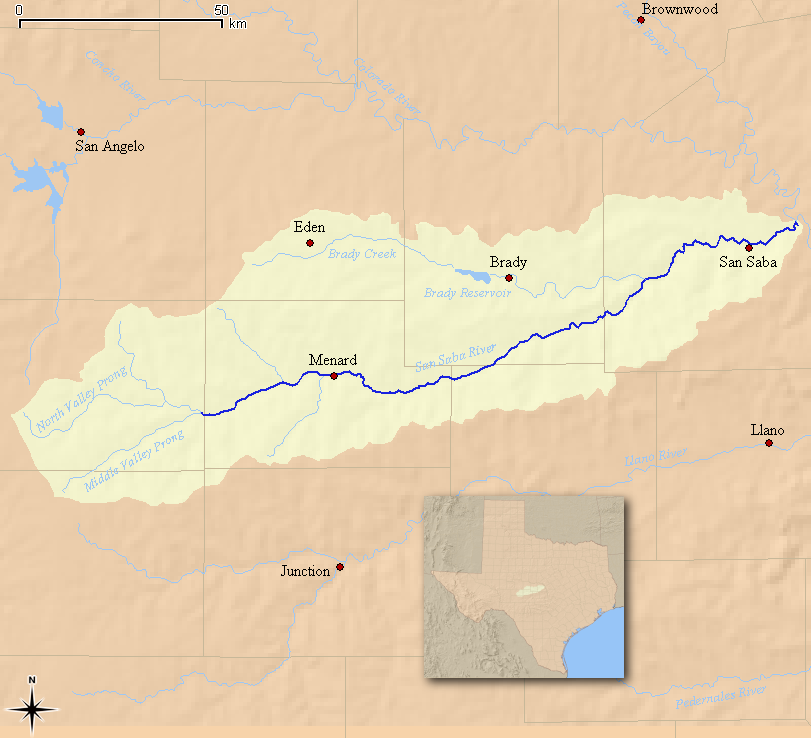
Map of the San Saba River and associated watershed

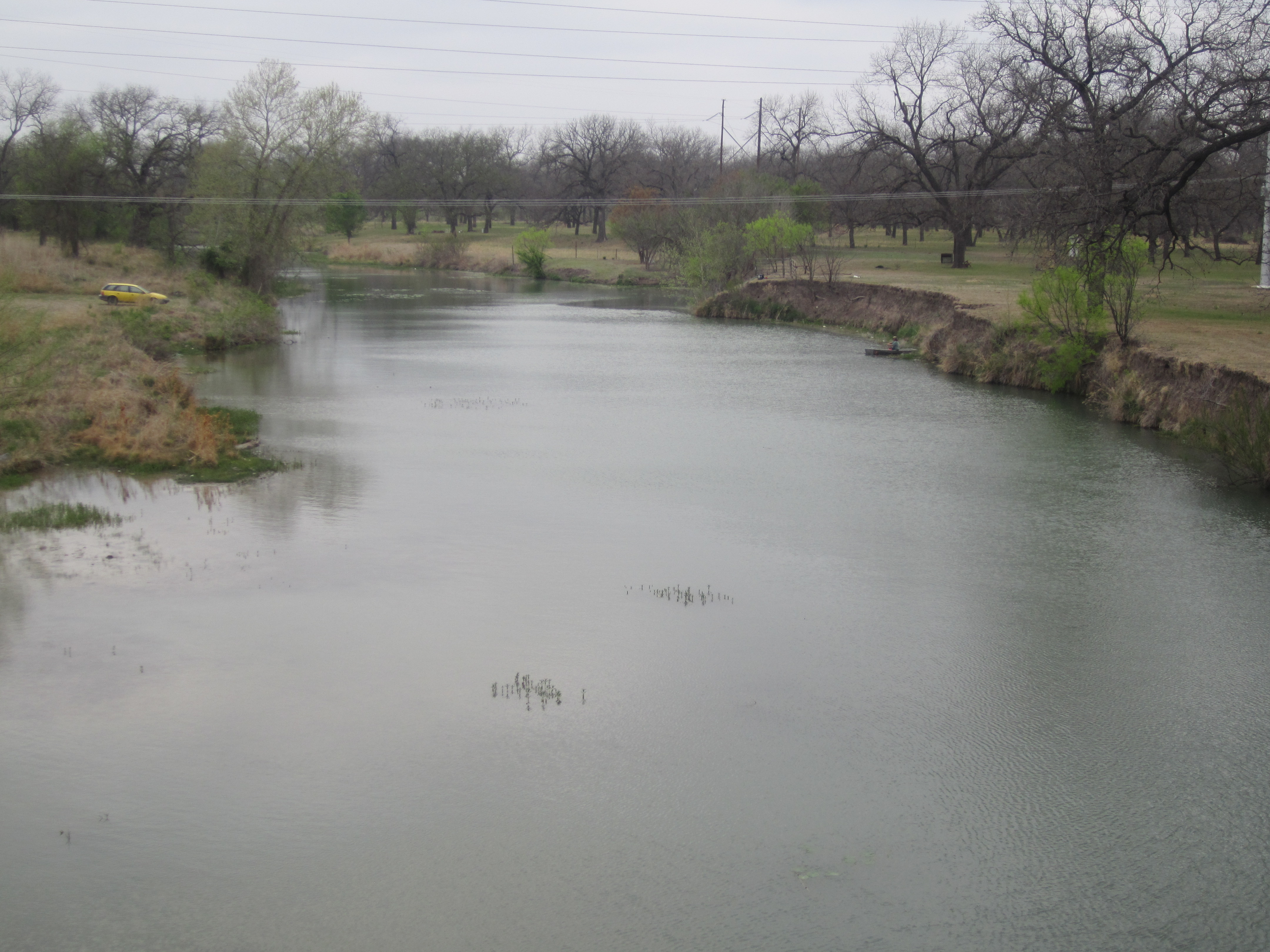
The San Saba in Menard, Texas

The San Saba River is a river in Texas, United States. It is an undeveloped and scenic waterway located on the northern boundary of the Edwards Plateau.

== Course ==
The river begins in two primary branches. The North Valley Prong runs east through Schleicher County for 37 miles, while the Middle Valley Prong runs 35 miles through the same county.

Both merge near Fort McKavett to form the San Saba River, which flows another 140 miles east/northeast until it drains into the Colorado River east of the city of San Saba.

A major tributary is Brady Creek, which is 90 miles long and parallels the path of the San Saba to the north.

== History ==
The river was named by the governor of Spanish Texas, Juan Antonio Bustillo y Ceballos, in 1732. He called it Río de San Sabá de las Nueces ("River of Saint Sabbas of the Walnuts"), because he and his troops had arrived December 5, the feast day of St. Sabbas (439–532), a major figure of early Christian monastic life.

Santa Cruz de San Sabá Mission was established on the river in 1757.

== Management ==
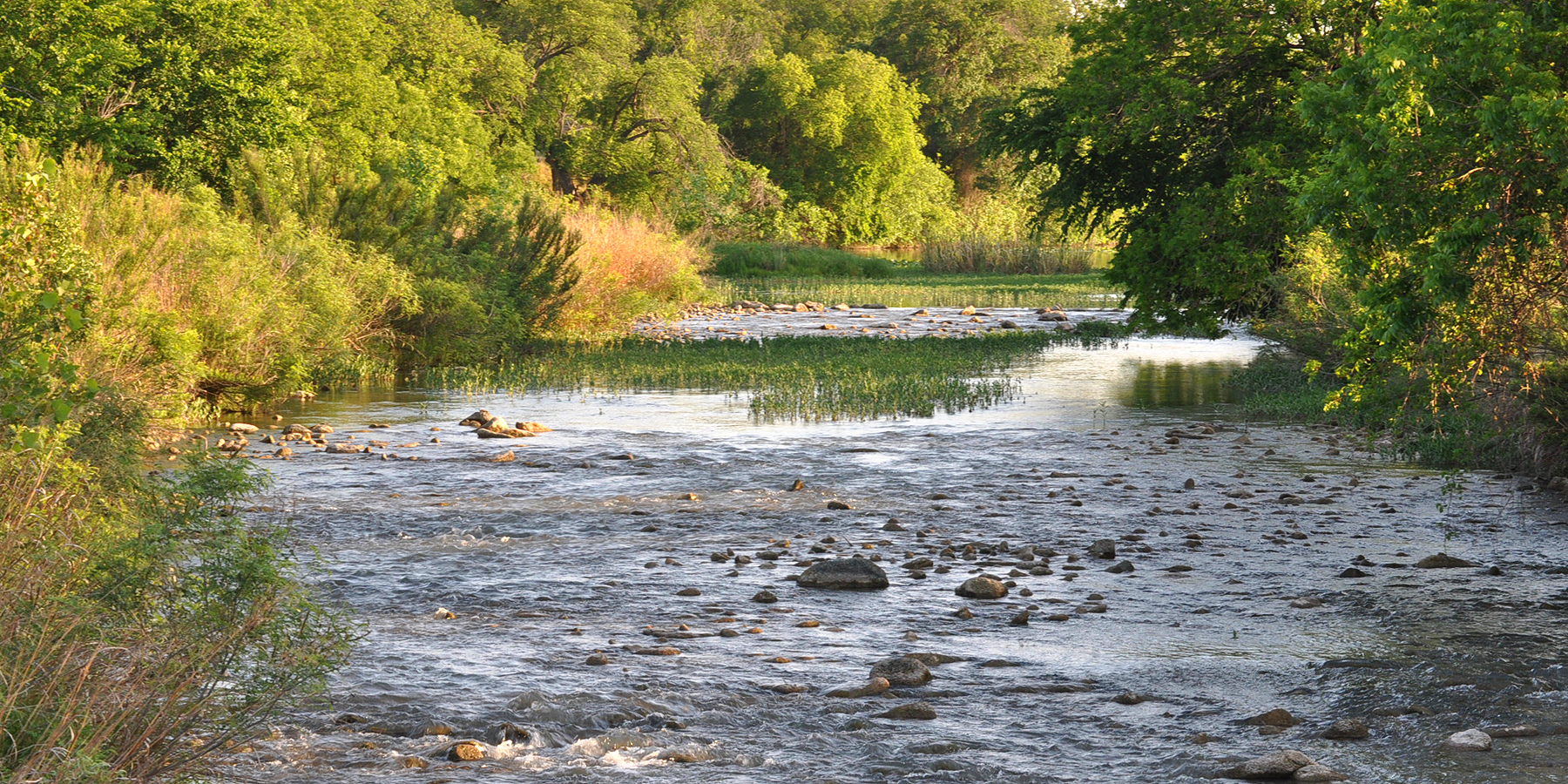
San Saba River near Sloan, San Saba County, Texas, USA (9 May 2014).

As of 2013, the San Saba River was an overappropriated stream with large stretches of the river dry, depriving downstream riparian users of water, while upstream flow was being diminished by pumping of aquifers hydrologically connected to the stream.

== See also ==
- List of rivers of Texas
