= Montezuma Copper Mining Company of Santa Fé, New Mexico =

American mining company

The Montezuma Copper Mining Company of Santa Fé, New Mexico was incorporated (1861) in the American Territory of New Mexico for the purpose of mining precious metals, industrial metals, and coal in the counties of Santa Ana, Santa Fé, San Miguel, and Rio Arriba.

== Corporate history ==
The Montezuma Copper Mining Company of Santa Fé, New Mexico was incorporated in the New Mexico Territorial Legislature on Jan 26, 1861, prior to the beginning of the American Civil War. Corporate members were: Oliver P. Hovey, Anastacio Sandoval, Hamilton G. Fant, Tomás Cabeza de Baca, Ceran St. Vrain, Nicolas Pino, A. P. Wilbar, Francisco Lopez, S. J. Spiegelberg, José Manuel Gallegos, H. B. Sweeny, Mateo Sandoval, Joseph Seligman, Felipe Delgado, Levi Spiegelberg, Francisco Montoya, Richard Jenkins, José Guadalupe Gallegos, Edward Wise, Andrés Sandoval, George C. Miller, Francisco Sandoval, M. Ashurst, Juan María Baca, Gabriel Rivera, William A. Street, José Pablo Gallegos, James Hubbell, Felix Garcia, James L. Collins, José Leandro Perea, John S. Watts, Faustin Baca y Ulibarri, Miguel Sena y Romero, and Sidney A. Hubbell. The initial capital stock value was $500,000.

The Spiegelberg brothers were also associated with the Willison Mining Company, as members of the board of directors, in 1872. It has been reported that Lehman Spiegelberg may have acquired the San Marcos Pueblo grant because of his interest in copper mining. It has been written that the Spiegelbergs were probably familiar with Indian agent William F. M. Arny's reports and newspaper articles on minerals in the area following his 1868 travels through Ute-controlled Tierra Amarilla, where he came into contact with mining parties. (Arny also served as Territorial secretary under governor Henry Connelly, for whom he served as acting governor for about half a year between 1862-3, during Connelly's illness.) Indian agents served as active promoters for mining development in New Mexico.

In 1863 Richard Jenkins, chief engineer of the operation, published the Report of the Montezuma Copper Mining Company of Santa Fe, New Mexico. Gilbert E. Currie listed the operation as follows in 1864: Capital $1,500,000. President: Ephraim Marsh; Vice President, B. G. Clarke; Secretary and Treasurer, David S. Dodge; Chief Engineer, Richard Jenkins; Directors, Ephraim Marsh, Benjamin G. Clark, Jos. H. Scranton, John T. Flanagan, Charles W. Keiser, Th. Dickson, Selden F. Scranton.

== Incorporation document ==
An Act to Incorporate the Montezuma Copper Mining Company of Santa Fé, New Mexico. Approved January 26, 1861. ...Be it enacted by the Legislative Assembly of the Territory of New Mexico:

Sec. 1. Montezuma Copper Mining Company of Santa Fé incorporated. Sec. 2 Powers and objects stated. Sec. 3. Capital Block limitation. Sec. 4. Officers, duties, and election; stockholders to vote how. Sec. 5. Assessments as determined by law.
Sec. 6. Quorum, what constitutes. Sec. 7. Stock certificates, issue and transfer. Sec. 8. Sales of stock authorized for delinquent assessments. Sec. 9. Roads, authority to make. Sec. I0. Forfeit of charter when.

...
Sec. 2. The said company shall have power in any lawful manner, whether by purchase, lease, donation, or license, to acquire, own, possess, use and enjoy any real or personal estate in the counties of Santa Ana, Santa Fé, San Miguel, and Rio Arriba, in the said Territory, and on and with the same to carry on and conduct the business of mining for copper, lead, gold, silver, tin, iron, or coal; and such real or personal estate, or any part or products of the same, to sell, lease, exchange, or in any other lawful manner to dispose of.

Sec. 3. The capital stock of said company shall consist of the sum of five hundred thousand dollars, or five thousand shares of one hundred dollars each; and the said company shall have the right and power to increase the said stock to the gross sum of fifteen hundred thousand dollars, or fifteen thousand shares of one hundred dollars each.

Sec. 4. ...That for the purpose of the first election, and for the discharge of other general business, the said stockholders shall hold their first meeting at Santa Fé, in said Territory, on the last Thursday of January, A.D. 1861, and in such first election each stockholder shall (in person, or by proxy in writing) be entitled to cast one vote for each share of stock by him subscribed and holden.

...
Sec. 6. That in every meeting of the stockholders of said company, such a number of stockholders present, in person or by proxy, as shall own or represent one-half of the whole capital stock, shall be sufficient to constitute a quorum to do business: Provided, that the said company may by its by-laws limit the powers of such quorum or require a larger representation of the capital stock for particular purposes in such by-laws to be defined.

...
Sec. 8. That when any stockholder of said company shall fail or refuse to pay any call or assessment required of him in conformity with the by-laws, rules or regulations of said company, it shall be lawful for the said company, through its officers or agents, to sell the stock of such defaulting stockholder, or so much thereof as shall be sufficient to make good such defalcation and all expenses; such sale to be made in such manner and after such notice as may be prescribed in such by-laws, rules or regulations; and the secretary of said company shall be authorized to transfer on the books of said company the stock so sold, to the purchaser thereof.

Sec. 9. The said company shall be and hereby is empowered to construct roads to and from any of its mines or lands, over lands belonging to said corporation or lawfully in its possession, and over any public lands or lands, not belonging to other individuals or corporations; but not over lands belonging to such other individuals or corporations except with their consent: But, provided further, that in any case where the said company shall have constructed their roads on or across any lands which were public at the time of such construction, and such lands shall be subsequently acquired by other persons, then such other persons shall take such lands subject to the right of way of said company along such roads.

Sec. 10. That in case the said company shall not, on or before the 31st day of December, A.D. 1862, have duly organized in conformity with the powers granted to it by this act, then it shall be considered to have forfeited each and all of the powers, privileges, rights and immunities granted to it by this act.

Sec. 11. This act shall be in full force and take effect from and after its passage.
