= New Mexico Wool Manufacturing Company =

The article of incorporation for the New Mexico Wool Manufacturing Company was introduced and passed in the New Mexico Territorial Legislature on January 30, 1861. Its founding associates were Ceran St. Vrain, José Guadalupe Gallegos, Oliver P. Hovey, Anastacio Sandoval, Rafael Armijo, José Manuel Gallegos, Hamilton G. Fant, Nazario Gonzales, J. Francisco Chaves; Levi Spiegelberg, A.P. Wilbar, Miguel A. Otero, William W. Griffin; José Leandro Perea (brother of Juan Perea, who was the father of Colonel Francisco Perea); S. J. Spiegelberg, Tomás Cabeza de Baca, Sidney A. Hubbell, Francisco Lopez, William A. Street, Ramon Luna; Miguel E. Pino, who became commander of 2nd New Mexico Volunteer Infantry during the Civil War; Thomas H. Hopkins; Simon Delgado (cousin of Miguel E. Pino) who, with his mother, Doña Maria de la Luy Baca de Delgado, purchased the Yglesia Castrense in Santa Fe from Bishop Lamy in exchange for $1,000 and a portion of the site for St. Michael's College (San Miguel College) in Santa Fe; M. Steck, Vicente García, Teodoro Baca, Vicente Romero, José Jaramillo, and Manuel Vigil. They claimed lawful use, occupation, and right to construct roads and erect buildings on, any wild lands within the Territory not the property of other individuals or corporations. They also claimed lawful use of (but not diversion of or injure others use of) water and the right to construct machinery on any river or stream upon said lands. The statement of capital stock was 3,500 shares at $100 each, or $350,000, with the right to increase the number of total shares to 7,500 at a value of $750,000.

In the 1907 publication History of New Mexico: its Resources and People, by George B. Anderson, the company was listed with date of charter January 28, 1863 and evaluated at $750,000.
