= 9th New Mexico Territorial Legislature =

The 9th New Mexico Territorial Legislature met in Santa Fe from December 5, 1859, to February 2, 1860.

== Territorial Council ==
- President: José Guadalupe Gallegos

Name	District	Notes
Merrill Ashurst	Santa Fe	
Francisco Tomas Cabeza de Baca	Santa Ana	
Spruce M. Baird	Bernalillo	
Joaquin A. Bazan	Valencia	
José Guadalupe Gallegos	San Miguel	
Pedro Bautista Gallegos	Rio Arriba	
Francisco Lopez	San Miguel	
Ignacio Orrantia	Doña Ana	Did not attend session
Antonio José Ortiz	Taos	
Antonio Maria Pacheco	Rio Arriba	
Felipe Romero	Taos	
José Antonio Torres	Socorro	
Santiago Valdez	Taos	

== House of Representatives ==
- Speaker: Levi J. Keithly (December 5, 1859 - January 18, 1860)
  Celso Cuellar y Medina (January 18, 1860 - February 2, 1860)

Name	District	Notes
Fernando Aragon	Bernalillo	
Teodoro Baca	San Miguel	
Joaquin Chavez	Santa Fe	
José Maria Chavez	Rio Arriba	
Celso Cuellar y Medina	Socorro	
Pablo Delgado	Santa Fe	
Mr. Duran	Valencia	Did not attend session
Nasario Gallegos	Taos	
Candelario Garcia	Socorro	
Victor Garcia	Taos	
Finis E. Kavanaugh	Santa Fe	
Levi J. Keithly	San Miguel	Speaker position declared vacant January 18, 1860; afterwards requested leave and did not attend the remainder of the session
Miguel Antonio Lovato	Bernalillo	
Isidoro Martin	Rio Arriba	
Matias Medina	Taos	
Juan Montoya	Santa Ana	
Miguel Ortiz	Taos	
Manuel S. Salazar	Rio Arriba	
Mauricio Sanchez	Valencia	
Ramon Sena y Rivera	Santa Fe	
Agustin Sisneros	Rio Arriba	
Antonio Tafoya	San Miguel	
Juan Torres	Bernalillo	
Vicente Trujillo	Rio Arriba	
Agapito Vigil	Taos	

Doña Ana County was embroiled in an effort to break away from New Mexico and establish a new territory of Arizona in the southern part of the territory and the Gadsden Purchase lands. As a result, its Council and House members did not attend and the name of its representative elected to the House, if there was one, is not known. The auditor noted that the county had not paid any of its expected returns into the territorial treasury. Also, the name "Duran" appears among the House's assignments of members to standing committees; this seems to be the representative elected to the second seat allocated to Valencia County, but he also did not appear at any point in the session.

The change in Speaker was precipitated when Keithly introduced on January 17, 1860, an act to repeal New Mexico's slavery law, which had just been adopted at the close of the previous legislature. His proposed repeal was not immediately rejected by the House, which apparently prompted great concern among territorial officials who largely aligned with the South. Samuel B. Watrous, a landowner who supported the repeal, alleged that once the House adjourned for the day, they recruited members to an event that evening at the home of Oliver P. Hovey, one of the legislation's sponsors when it passed the previous session. Watrous claimed the representatives who attended were plied with liquor and bribes in gold coin, resulting in a turnabout the next day.

When the House met again, Keithly returned to find himself accused of being a "Black Republican" (i.e. an abolitionist), and that a coalition of members, many of whom had seemed sympathetic to his bill the day before, were organizing his deposition as Speaker. He strenuously denied being an abolitionist. African slavery was hardly present in New Mexico aside from a handful of personal servants who had accompanied federal troops or territorial officials from their home states. Most supporters of repeal may have favored excluding blacks from the territory entirely, both free and slave. However, the House refused Keithly's protests regarding the irregularity of his removal, so he requested leave and departed (though he would be elected again to the House in the next legislature).
