= 10th New Mexico Territorial Legislature =

The 10th New Mexico Territorial Legislature met in Santa Fe from December 3, 1860, to January 31, 1861.

== Territorial Council ==
- President: José Guadalupe Gallegos

Name	District	Notes
Merrill Ashurst	Santa Fe	
Francisco Tomas Cabeza de Baca	Santa Ana	
Joaquin A. Bazan	Valencia	
José Guadalupe Gallegos	San Miguel	
Pedro Bautista Gallegos	Rio Arriba	
Sidney A. Hubbell	Bernalillo	Elected to fill vacancy
Francisco Lopez	San Miguel	
Ignacio Orrantia	Doña Ana	Did not attend session
Antonio José Ortiz	Taos	
Antonio Maria Pacheco	Rio Arriba	
Felipe Romero	Taos	
José Antonio Torres	Socorro	
Santiago Valdez	Taos	

== House of Representatives ==
- Speaker: José Manuel Gallegos

Name	District	Notes
Rumaldo Baca	Socorro	
Felix Borrego	Taos	Seated December 20, 1860
Vicente Chavez	Bernalillo	
José Francisco Chavez y Perea	Valencia	
José Manuel Gallegos	Santa Fe	
Pablo Gallegos	Rio Arriba	
Candelario Garcia	Socorro	
José Antonio Garcia	Bernalillo	
Geronimo Jaramillo	Rio Arriba	
Finis E. Kavanaugh	Santa Fe	
Levi J. Keithly	San Miguel	
Miguel Antonio Lovato	Bernalillo	
José A. Martinez	Taos	
José Mestas	Mora	
Sabino Mondragon	Taos	
Miguel E. Pino	Santa Fe	
Emiterio Rael	San Miguel	
Juan Antonio Ruival	Rio Arriba	
Francisco Salazar	Rio Arriba	
Esmeregildo Sanchez	Santa Ana	
Felipe Sanchez	Taos	Seat declared vacant December 19, 1860
Manuel Trujillo	Rio Arriba	
Vicente Valdez	Santa Fe	
Theodore D. Wheaton	Taos	
John Whitlock	San Miguel	

Felix Borrego contested the election of Felipe Sanchez as representative from Taos. The House committee on elections concluded that 70 votes for Borrego in two precincts had been improperly stricken from his total. The revised numbers were sufficient to give him the majority, so Sanchez was removed from the House and Borrego seated in his place.

Meanwhile, Doña Ana County continued its failure from the previous session of sending representatives to either house. The remaining House seat assigned to Valencia County is somewhat of a mystery in the House records. When the House conducted its organizational business on the first day of the session, the name of Antonio José Otero was put forward for the office of Speaker and received six votes, losing to Gallegos. Otero was from Valencia and could have been its elected representative. However, the journal of the House does not reflect that Otero was ever present, that he was sworn in with the other representatives, or that he participated in the session at any point. The sole exception is that the name "Otero" is recorded once in the list of House committee assignments, but it appears that Geronimo Jaramillo served on that committee in his place.
