= 7th New Mexico Territorial Legislature =

The 7th New Mexico Territorial Legislature met in Santa Fe from December 7, 1857, to February 4, 1858.

== Territorial Council ==
- President: Donaciano Vigil

Name	District	Notes
Jesus Maria Baca	Santa Ana and Bernalillo	
Alvino Chacon	Taos	
Henry Connelly	Santa Ana and Bernalillo	Seated after election contest
Cesario Duran	Doña Ana	
Nasario Gonzales	Santa Fe and San Miguel	
Lafayette Head	Taos	
Geronimo Jaramillo	Rio Arriba	
Jose Benito Martinez	Taos	
Pedro Salazar	Rio Arriba	
Juan Jose Sanchez	Valencia	
Miguel Sena y Romero	Santa Fe and San Miguel	
Mariano Silva	Socorro	
Donaciano Vigil	Santa Fe and San Miguel	

The election result between Connelly and J. Serafin Ramirez for one of the seats for Santa Ana and Bernalillo was disputed. Ramirez received the certificate of election, but local judges provided declarations and an abstract of the results showing that a majority of votes were for Connelly. After considering the evidence, the Council seated Connelly.

== House of Representatives ==
- Speaker: Merrill Ashurst

Name	District	Notes
Juan C. Armijo	Bernalillo	
Pedro Arragon	Rio Arriba	Seat declared vacant December 16, 1857
Merrill Ashurst	Santa Fe	
Antonio Guadalupe Cordova	Rio Arriba	Seat declared vacant December 16, 1857
Jose Cordova	Taos	
Francisco Gallegos	Taos	
José Guadalupe Gallegos	San Miguel	
Pedro Bautista Gallegos	Rio Arriba	Seat declared vacant December 16, 1857
Joaquin Garcia	Taos	
Faubian Gonzales	Socorro	
Francisco Gonzales	Taos	
Hilario Gonzales	San Miguel	
Teodoro Gonzales	Santa Fe	
Jesus Maria de Herrera	Rio Arriba	Seated December 17, 1857
Miguel Antonio Lovato	Bernalillo	
Ventura Lovato	Taos	
Jose Lueras	Bernalillo	
Jose Maria Martinez	Santa Fe	
Francisco Martinez y Romero	Rio Arriba	Died prior to session
Juan Montoya	Valencia	
Gervacio Ortega	Rio Arriba	Seated December 17, 1857
Francisco Ortiz y Delgado	Santa Fe	Seated after election contest
Ramos Pacheco	Rio Arriba	Elected to fill Martinez y Romero vacancy
Marcial Padilla	Doña Ana	
Gabriel Rivera	San Miguel	
Francisco Antonio Salazar y Romero	Rio Arriba	Seated December 17, 1857
Francisco Sandavasa	Valencia	Died during session
Patricio Silva	Santa Ana	
Pedro Torres	Socorro	
Antonio Maria Vigil	Rio Arriba	

Ortiz y Delgado was seated by the House after consideration of an election contest with José Manuel Gallegos, of which no further details were given.

A dispute over four of the Rio Arriba seats was referred to the House Committee on Elections. The committee found that in the precinct of Servilleta, the election held on September 7, 1857, was tainted due to a lack of public notice of the nature of the election and improper conduct by an election judge. Testimony indicated that many voters believed the election was regarding formation of a state government, rather than the territorial legislature. Meanwhile, Ramos Pacheco, who had acted in a dual capacity as judge and clerk that day, admitted that he read aloud the ballots as they were received so the clerks could record the vote.

On the committee's recommendation, the House nullified the Servilleta votes along with others shown to have been cast by ineligible voters. With the election results recalculated on that basis, it concluded that Francisco Antonio Salazar y Romero had defeated Antonio Guadalupe Cordova, Jesus Maria de Herrera had defeated Pedro Arragon, and Gervacio Ortega had defeated Pedro Bautista Gallegos. Due to his greater margin of victory, Antonio Maria Vigil retained his seat over the fourth contestant, John H. Mink. And despite Pacheco's actions, the committee did not question his subsequent election to the fifth Rio Arriba seat in place of Francisco Martinez y Romero, the deceased original winner.
