= 6th New Mexico Territorial Legislature =

The 6th New Mexico Territorial Legislature met in Santa Fe from December 1, 1856, to January 29, 1857.

== Territorial Council ==
- President: Facundo Pino

Name	District	Notes
Henry Connelly	Bernalillo	
Domingo Cubero	Doña Ana	
Simon Delgado	Santa Fe	
José Pablo Gallegos	Rio Arriba	
Anastacio Garcia	Socorro	
Lafayette Head	Taos	Elected to fill vacancy
José Antonio Manzanares	Rio Arriba	
Pascual Martinez	Taos	
José Antonio Ortiz	Taos	
Facundo Pino	Santa Fe	
Manuel Doroteo Pino	San Miguel	
José Salazar	Valencia	
Francisco Sandoval	Santa Ana	

José Benito Valdez, member of the Council during the 5th Legislative Assembly, resigned and his seat was taken by Head.

== House of Representatives ==
- Speaker: J. Serafin Ramirez

Name	District
Diego Archuleta	Rio Arriba
Juan Maria Baca	San Miguel
Rumaldo Baca	Socorro
José Baca y Delgado	Santa Fe
Juan Cristobal Chavez	Valencia
Cesario Duran	Doña Ana
José Dolores Duran	Taos
Samuel Ellison	Santa Fe
Victor Garcia	Santa Fe
Juan M. Gutierrez	San Miguel
Juan José Lucero	Bernalillo
Manuel Martinez	Taos
José Miera	Santa Ana
Lorenzo Montaño	Bernalillo
José Pino	Valencia
J. Serafin Ramirez	Bernalillo
Juan Andres Romero	Taos
Miguel Sena y Romero	San Miguel
José Antonio Torres	Socorro
Jesus Trujillo	Rio Arriba
Manuel Trujillo	Rio Arriba
Manuel Valdez	Rio Arriba
Santiago Valdez	Taos
Jesus Velasquez	Taos
Jesus Maria Vigil	Rio Arriba
James J. Webb	Santa Fe
