= Joab Houghton =

American lawyer and judge

Joab Houghton (1811 – January 31, 1876) was an American lawyer and judge who served as the first Chief Justice of New Mexico.

A native of New York, Houghton came to New Mexico when it was still a Mexican territory, and became a successful merchant. Though lacking any legal education, he was appointed Chief Justice when New Mexico was occupied by the United States in 1846 during the Mexican–American War. In 1850, Houghton led an anti-slavery faction in the drafting of New Mexico's proposed constitution during its first attempt at statehood. His service as Chief Justice ended in 1851, and he practiced law in Santa Fe, as he would during much of his life, and also served as a district attorney during the American Civil War.

Houghton was again appointed a justice of the Supreme Court of New Mexico Territory from 1865 to 1869. He made numerous political enemies, and his rulings regarding property confiscated during the Civil War were widely criticized as contrary to basic legal principles. After his replacement on the bench, Houghton spent his last years in private legal practice.

== Early life and business ==
Houghton was born in New York in 1811. He attended college and then worked as a civil engineer. Houghton arrived in New Mexico in 1843, traveling over the Santa Fe Trail on a trading expedition. He entered into a mercantile partnership in Santa Fe with brothers Eugene and Thomas Leitensdorfer, doing business as E. Leitensdorfer & Co. from 1844 until 1848, when it went bankrupt. Prior to its failing, it was considered the leading mercantile house west of the Missouri River. Houghton also began a partnership with Jared W. Folger in 1847, operating as Houghton & Folger.

== Chief Justice of the New Mexico provisional government: 1846–1851 ==
Houghton was appointed the U.S. consul in Santa Fe in 1845. He was serving in that capacity when Santa Fe was occupied by the United States Army in August 1846, shortly after the start of the Mexican–American War. The military governor, General Stephen W. Kearney, quickly formed a civilian provisional government, and on September 22, 1846, appointed Houghton as Chief Justice of the Supreme Court alongside two associate justices, Charles H. Beaubien and Antonio Jose Otero. Like both of his colleagues, Houghton had no legal training, though he read law as a hobby and continued to study it while serving on the bench. As a consequence of Houghton's ignorance of the law, the court's record-keeping was inadequate and irregular, and he also issued no rules of practice to guide attorneys in his court. In the two terms he would ultimately serve on the bench, Houghton apparently filed only one written opinion. Most of the bar of New Mexico at the time, however, was even more ignorant of basic legal principles than Houghton. Even apart from those limitations, the court's functioning was frequently impaired by the military's interference with its orders.

In 1847, Houghton presided over several trials for treason resulting from the Taos Revolt, an insurrection against the American occupation that culminated in the assassination of Governor Charles Bent. Houghton's dramatic sentencing of conspirator Antonio Maria Trujillo to death by hanging has been frequently noted by historians:

Antonio Maria Trujillo:—A jury of twelve citizens, after a patient and careful investigation, pending which all the safeguards of the law, managed by able and indefatigable counsel, have been afforded you, have found you guilty of the high crime of treason. What have you to say why the sentence of death should not be pronounced against you? Your age and gray hairs have excited the sympathy of both the court and the jury. Yet, while each and all were not only willing but anxious that you should have every advantage placed at your disposal that their highly responsible duty under the laws to their country would permit, you have been found guilty of the crime alleged to your charge. It would appear that old age has not brought you wisdom, nor purity, nor honesty of heart. While holding out the hand of friendship to those whom circumstances have brought to rule over you, you have nourished bitterness and hatred in your heart. You have been found seconding the acts of a band of the most traitorous murderers that ever blackened with the recital of their deeds the annals of history. Not content with the peace and security in which you have lived under the present government, secure in all your personal rights as a citizen, in property, in person, and in your religion, you gave your name and influence to measures intended to effect universal murder and pillage, the overthrow of the government and one widespread scene of bloodshed in the land. For such foul crimes an enlightened and liberal jury have been compelled, from the evidence brought before them, and by a sense of their stern but unmistakable duty, to find you guilty of treason against the government under which you are a citizen. And there only now remains to the court the painful duty of passing upon you the sentence of the law, which is that you be taken from hence to prison, there to remain until Friday, the 16th day of April next, and that, at two o'clock in the afternoon of that day, you be taken thence to the place of execution, and there be hanged by the neck till you are dead! dead! dead! And may the Almighty God have mercy on your soul!

— JOAB HOUGHTON, Judge. Court records, Santa Fe District Court, March 16, 1847.

It is not certain, however, whether the sentence was ever carried out.

Houghton was strongly opposed to slavery and believed its introduction to New Mexico would have a detrimental effect on its people and industries. These views made Houghton extremely unpopular with members of Congress from southern states. In New Mexico's first bid for statehood, Houghton led a faction of anti-slavery delegates in the 1850 constitutional convention. Commanding the majority, Houghton wrote much of the constitution himself, which contained a declaration against slavery and a total rejection of land claims by Texas to portions of New Mexico. Houghton's main political rival in the statehood issue, Richard Hanson Weightman, viciously attacked Houghton in public speeches and filed charges with the military governor asking for Houghton's removal. Houghton responded by challenging Weightman to a duel. The duel proceeded and ended anticlimactically. Weightman fired first but missed Houghton. Houghton, being partially deaf, did not hear the command to fire. Before Houghton could take his shot, the seconds intervened and forced Weightman to make an apology of sorts. Their political dispute was largely rendered moot when the bid for statehood was ended by the Compromise of 1850, which instead organized New Mexico Territory, and provided that the issue of slavery would be decided by popular vote.

== Between judicial appointments: private practice, political rivalries, and wartime prosecutions ==
Houghton's service as Chief Justice ended March 1, 1851; the incoming governor of the newly formed Territory, James S. Calhoun, believed the provisional court to have been abolished by Congress. Houghton's removal from the court possibly increased his enmity towards Calhoun, who was a pro-slavery southerner. Houghton tried to have him removed as governor, in part by alleging that Calhoun took sides with wealthy natives and Catholic Church officials against American residents. Calhoun died the following year. Houghton also made an enemy of his successor as Chief Justice, Grafton Baker, and was one of many who actively sought Baker's removal. In 1853, Houghton appeared as a litigant in Baker's court, in a case involving a debt charged to the Leitensdorfer partnership. Baker ruled against him. The case was appealed to the U.S. Supreme Court, which affirmed Baker's decision.

After leaving the bench, Houghton practiced law in Santa Fe, and helped form the Historical Society of New Mexico. He was appointed Superintendent of Public Buildings on January 15, 1853, and designed the plans for the new capitol building. Its construction halted in 1857 due to lack of funds; it would not be completed until 1889, when it was repurposed as a federal courthouse that is still in use, as the Santiago E. Campos United States Courthouse. In 1861, he was appointed Register of the United States General Land Office in Santa Fe; he served in that position until 1868.

At the start of the American Civil War, Houghton took the lead in rallying support for the Union and against Texas, which had seceded. He was named the wartime district attorney for New Mexico on September 19, 1861; he zealously got indictments for treason against several prominent citizens who he believed were southern sympathizers, but was unable to obtain any convictions.

== Justice of the Territorial Supreme Court, 1865–1869 ==
On December 21, 1865, Houghton was nominated by President Andrew Johnson to the Territorial Supreme Court, as an associate justice presiding over the Third District. Houghton maintained a residence in Santa Fe, outside of his district, for which he was accused of ignoring the legal requirements of his position. Houghton was also widely denounced for his handling of numerous lawsuits involving property confiscated during the American Civil War. Among the most criticized aspects of these rulings, often attributed to his poor understanding of the law, were Houghton's assumption of jurisdiction over property in El Paso, Texas, and his insistence that the confiscation proceedings could proceed ex parte and tried without a jury. Houghton's court consequently earned the reputation of being a mere "prize court". In January, 1869, the territorial Legislative Council addressed a memorial to the president requesting that Houghton be replaced. Upon taking office, President Grant replaced the entire court, appointing Abram Bergen to Houghton's seat.

== Later life and death ==
Houghton subsequently practiced law in Santa Fe until 1874, when he moved to Las Vegas, New Mexico. He died there on January 31, 1876.
