= 8th New Mexico Territorial Legislature =

The 8th New Mexico Territorial Legislature met in Santa Fe from December 6, 1858, to February 3, 1859.

== Territorial Council ==
- President: Lafayette Head

Name	District	Notes
Jesus Maria Baca	Santa Ana	
Alvino Chacon	Taos	
Henry Connelly	Bernalillo	
Cesario Duran	Doña Ana	Did not attend session
Nasario Gonzales	Santa Fe	
Lafayette Head	Taos	
Geronimo Jaramillo	Rio Arriba	
Jose Benito Martinez	Taos	
Pedro Salazar	Rio Arriba	
Juan Jose Sanchez	Valencia	
Miguel Sena y Romero	San Miguel	
Mariano Silva	Socorro	
Donaciano Vigil	San Miguel	

== House of Representatives ==
- Speaker: José Guadalupe Gallegos

Name	District	Notes
José Apodaca	Socorro	
Pedro Aragon	Rio Arriba	
Antonio Reyes Aragon	San Miguel	
Juan Benavides	Santa Fe	
Damacio Chavez	Bernalillo	Declared elected December 30, 1858, but did not attend
Antonio Guadalupe Cordova	Rio Arriba	
José Guadalupe Gallegos	San Miguel	
Ignacio Gonzales	Bernalillo	Declared elected December 30, 1858, but did not attend
Miguel Gonzales	Bernalillo	Seat declared vacant December 30, 1858
Jesus Maria de Herrera	Santa Fe	
Manuel de Herrera	San Miguel	
Oliver P. Hovey	Santa Fe	
Manuel Jaramillo	Rio Arriba	
Francisco Lopez	Valencia	
Nicolas Lucero	Santa Ana	
José Lueras	Bernalillo	Seat declared vacant December 30, 1858
Pedro Mares	Taos	
Antonio Martinez	Rio Arriba	
Francisco Perea	Bernalillo	Declared elected December 30, 1858, but declined the seat
Bonifacio Romero	Santa Fe	
Mateo Romero	Taos	
Francisco Estevan Salazar	Rio Arriba	
Miguel Salazar	Doña Ana	
Felipe Sanchez	Taos	
Mr. Torres	Socorro	
Pedro Valdez	Taos	
Jose Vigil	Valencia	
Rafael Vigil	Taos	

The House vacated two seats for Bernalillo County when it was belatedly informed that those occupying the seats were not legally elected based on the original election returns.
