= 5th New Mexico Territorial Legislature =

The 5th New Mexico Territorial Legislature met in Santa Fe from December 3, 1855, to January 31, 1856.

== Territorial Council ==
- President: Facundo Pino

Name	District
Henry Connelly	Bernalillo
Domingo Cubero	Doña Ana
Simon Delgado	Santa Fe
José Pablo Gallegos	Rio Arriba
Anastacio Garcia	Socorro
José Antonio Manzanares	Rio Arriba
Pascual Martinez	Taos
José Antonio Ortiz	Taos
Facundo Pino	Santa Fe
Manuel Doroteo Pino	San Miguel
José Salazar	Valencia
Francisco Sandoval	Santa Ana
José Benito Valdez	Taos

== House of Representatives ==
- Speaker: Celedonio Valdez

Name	District
Juan Antonio Baca	Taos
Jesus M. Cabeza de Baca	Santa Ana
Antonio Baca y Baca	San Miguel
Manuel Baca y Delgado	Santa Fe
Damasio Chavez	Valencia
José Guadalupe Gallegos	San Miguel
Candelario Garcia	Socorro
Victor Garcia	Santa Fe
José Damian Giron	Taos
José Gonzales y Gutierrez	San Miguel
Sidney A. Hubbell	Bernalillo
Salvador Lucero	Rio Arriba
Francisco Martinez y Romero	Rio Arriba
Domingo Mondragon	Taos
Juan Montoya	Bernalillo
Candido Ortiz	Santa Fe
J. Serafin Ramirez	Bernalillo
Rafael Ruelas	Doña Ana
Romualdo Salazar	Rio Arriba
Anastacio Sandoval	Santa Fe
Julian Solis	Taos
Pedro Torres	Socorro
Celedonio Valdez	Rio Arriba
José Valdez	Rio Arriba
Santiago Valdez	Taos
Juan Vigil	Valencia
