= 2nd New Mexico Territorial Legislature =

The 2nd New Mexico Territorial Legislature met in Santa Fe from December 6, 1852, to January 14, 1853.

== Territorial Council ==
- President: Juan Felipe Ortiz

Name	District
Tomas Cabeza de Baca	3
Florentino Castillo	4
Juan Cristoval Chavez	4
José Manuel Gallegos	3
Pablo Gallegos	1
George Gold	1
José Francisco Leiba	2
Antonio José Martínez	1
Vicente Martinez	1
Antonio Ortiz	1
Juan Felipe Ortiz	2
Francisco Antonio Otero	4
Hugh N. Smith	2

== House of Representatives ==
- Speaker: Theodore D. Wheaton

Name	District	Notes
Juan Cristoval Armijo	Bernalillo	
Domingo Baca	Santa Fe	Died prior to session
Juan Maria Baca	San Miguel	
Rumaldo Baca	Socorro	
José Antonio Baca y Pino	Socorro	
José Maria Chavez	Rio Arriba	
Rafael Chavez	Valencia	
John C. Craddock	Doña Ana	
José de la Luz Gallegos	Rio Arriba	
José Gabriel Gallegos	Taos	
Francisco Gonzales	Taos	
Hilario Gonzales	San Miguel	
Geronimo Jaramillo	Rio Arriba	
Pascual Martinez	Taos	
Francisco Martinez y Romero	Rio Arriba	
Candido Ortiz	Santa Fe	
José Eulogio Ortiz	Santa Fe	
Miguel A. Otero	Valencia	Seat declared vacant December 31, 1852
Juan Perea	Bernalillo	Resigned due to health
Facundo Pino	Santa Fe	
Miguel Sena y Romero	San Miguel	
Jesus Silva	Santa Ana	
Vivian Sisneros	Taos	
Murray F. Tuley	Bernalillo	
Celedonio Valdez	Rio Arriba	
Donaciano Vigil	Santa Fe	
Theodore D. Wheaton	Taos	
