= New Mexican Railway Company =

The New Mexican Railway Company was incorporated in the Territorial Legislature of New Mexico on Feb 2, 1860, prior to the beginning of the American Civil War. Corporate members were Henry Connelly, Antonio J. Otero, who served as a justice of the New Mexico Territorial Supreme Court; Ambrosio Armijo (the father of Colonel Perfecto Armijo); José Felipe Chavez, Francisco Chavez; Spruce M. Baird, a judge sent by Texas during the U.S. provisional government of New Mexico to organize their claimed land east of the Rio Grande as the Santa Fe county of Texas; Francisco Perea, José Leandro Perea, who was the uncle of Francisco, Charles B. Clark, José Guadalupe Gallegos, Stephen Boice, William H. Moore, Ceran St. Vrain, Thomas C. de Baca, Merrill Ashurst, Duff Green, John Titus, David R. Porter, Oliver W. Barney, and Philip L. Fox. The Memorial of the New Mexican Railway Company, in Relation to the Pacific Railroad was introduced by Miguel Antonio Otero in the United States Congress on May 21, 1860. It was an argument in favor of the southern route for a transcontinental railroad. Arguments over the central vs. southern route were a part of the complex of insoluble relations between states, dating back to James Gadsden's involvement in 1845 (as described in the discussion under the Gadsden Purchase). These arguments contributed to the outbreak of the American Civil War. The New Mexican Railway Company was formed in conjunction with the attempt to retain rights of in-state railroad construction oversight within the Territorial government. The act of incorporation stated that company rights and privileges would be forfeited if construction had not begun within a period of five years. Beginning in 1862, after the outbreak of Civil War, the Union Pacific Railroad and the Central Pacific Railroad of California were granted lands and construction privileges for the First transcontinental railroad project under the Pacific Railway Acts. Construction of this Overland Route was begun in 1863 and completed in 1869. The southern route did not become a reality until 1883, when the Southern Pacific Railroad linked New Orleans and the Gulf of Mexico with Los Angeles and the Pacific Ocean.

== Memorial... in Relation to the Pacific Railroad ==
The Memorial document is an attempt to persuade the U.S. Congress to authorize construction of the first Transcontinental Railroad via a southern route through New Mexico rather than the route that was eventually authorized by the Pacific Railway Acts of 1862 and 1864. Several arguments were made in favor of the southern route including preferable weather conditions for operations, shorter distances, lesser grades, proximity to the southern border for military action and for Mexican mineral resources, proximity to southern ports of the Gulf of Mexico and the Pacific, and overall cost-benefit savings. Issues of slavery were also discussed in the document. In addition, in the case that the southern route was chosen, the document stressed the rights of the New Mexico Territorial Legislature to oversee and assign land and resources within their territory that would be involved in completion of such a project. The New Mexican Railway Company was incorporated for these purposes.

- Bills, on leave, were further introduced as follows, viz: By Mr. Otero: A bill (H. R. 761) to authorize contracts for carrying the mails and troops and naval and military stores on the New Orleans, Opetousas, and Great Western, the Sabine and Rio Grande, the Southern Pacific and New Mexican railways, and for other purposes; which was read a first and second time, and referred to the select committee on the Pacific railroad, and, together with the memorial of the New Mexican Railway Company, ordered to be printed.
- The memorial of the undersigned respectfully represents that at their late session the legislature of the Territory of New Mexico passed an act, (a copy whereof is hereto annexed,) incorporating them under the name and style of "The New Mexican Railway Company," with authority and privilege "to locate, construct, own, and maintain a railway, commencing at such point on the eastern boundary of said Territory as after exploration they may select, and running thence across the entire Territory in the direction of California, upon such route as after survey they may designate, with such branches as they may from time to time construct for the purpose of connecting their said road with any other railroad made or to be made in Mexico or in Texas, or in any adjoining State or Territory." And the said legislature have also "granted and transferred to the said New Mexican Railway Company all the right, title, and interest which the Territory of New Mexico has now or may have hereafter in any grant of land made by the United States in aid of the construction of a railroad or of a branch railroad in the Territory of New Mexico, which road or branch road may be made by the said company."
- The undersigned, therefore, submit that whatever grants of land or public credit may be given by the government of the United States in aid of the construction of a railroad through New Mexico should be given to them, the said New Mexican Railway Company; and they respectfully protest against the proposition now pending before your honorable body to give to an association of individuals, without authority from the Territory of New Mexico, grants of land and of credit to enable them to construct what is termed a Pacific railway. The report of the Hon. Mr. Curtis, (H. R. No. 428,) and the accompanying bill (No. 646) propose to give to a number of individuals therein named, and to such persons as a majority of those individuals shall admit as their associates, sixty millions of dollars, ($60,000,000,) equal to $33,860 per mile, in aid of the construction of a railway upon the route recommended by the committee.
- ...the sum asked for the so-called central route is sixty millions of dollars, with a declaration that the road is to cost one hundred and twenty millions; whereas the Southern Pacific Railroad Company ask but thirty-five millions, and the official estimates show that this difference in the sums asked for is not greater than the difference in the cost of these roads will be. It is therefore apparent, that by making an appropriation in aid of the southern route the government will receive much greater services for a much less sum.

== Incorporation Document ==
It is apparent that the act of incorporation was an attempt to keep the allocation of lands and construction resources for the railroad within NM Territory under the jurisdiction of the Territorial government. The act of incorporation stated that company rights and privileges would be forfeited if construction had not begun within a period of five years.

- Section 9. Be it further enacted: That it is hereby made incumbent upon the said company hereby incorporated, to commence actual operations in laying out, locating and grading said road within the limits of the Territory of New Mexico, within five years from and after the passage of this act; and upon their failure to do so, all the rights, privileges and immunities hereby granted to said company are hereby revoked, and this charter to said company is hereby forfeited.
- Section 10. That all laws or parts of laws in conflict with the provisions of this act are hereby repealed, and this act shall be in force from and after its passage."
