= 4th New Mexico Territorial Legislature =

The 4th New Mexico Territorial Legislature met in Santa Fe from December 4, 1854, to February 1, 1855.

== Territorial Council ==
- President: José Antonio Baca y Pino

Name	District	Notes
Antonio Maria Baca	Socorro	
Juan Cruz Baca	Valencia	
José Antonio Baca y Pino	Socorro	
Antonio Baca y Sisneros	San Miguel	
Henry Connelly	Bernalillo	
George Gold	Taos	
José Antonio Manzanares	Rio Arriba	
José Maria Martinez	Taos	
Vicente Martinez	Taos	
Tomas Ortiz	Santa Fe	Died prior to session
James H. Quinn	Taos	
Anastacio Sandoval	Santa Fe	Elected to fill Ortiz vacancy, seated December 21, 1854
Francisco Sandoval	Doña Ana	
José Ulibarri	San Miguel	

== House of Representatives ==
- Speaker: Facundo Pino

Name	District	Notes
Diego Archuleta	Rio Arriba	
Faustin Baca	San Miguel	
Rumaldo Baca	Socorro	
Jose Baca y Delgado	Santa Fe	
Manuel Barela	San Miguel	
Juan Bernadet	Taos	
Antonio Chavez	Valencia	Motion to remove from his seat on December 9, 1854, not sustained
Celso Cuellar y Medina	Socorro	
Pablo Gallegos	Rio Arriba	
Juan Gutierrez	San Miguel	
Sidney A. Hubbell	Bernalillo	
Geronimo Jaramillo	Rio Arriba	
James A. Lucas	Doña Ana	
Guadalupe Lujan	Taos	
Pascual Martinez	Taos	
Francisco Martinez y Romero	Rio Arriba	
Candido Ortiz	Santa Fe	
Facundo Pino	Santa Fe	
Miguel E. Pino	Santa Fe	
J. Serafin Ramirez	Bernalillo	
Juan Antonio Ruival	Rio Arriba	
Felipe Sanchez	Taos	
Manuel Sanchez	Valencia	
Narciso Sante Estevan	Bernalillo	
Santiago Valdez	Taos	
Manuel Viscarra	Santa Ana	

A resolution was presented on December 9, 1854, to remove Antonio Chavez as representative of Valencia County and declare Rafael Gutierrez as the representative-elect for the seat. After some procedural wrangling, the motion narrowly failed.
