= 3rd New Mexico Territorial Legislature =

The 3rd New Mexico Territorial Legislature met in Santa Fe from December 5, 1853, to February 2, 1854.

== Territorial Council ==
- President: James H. Quinn

| Name | District | Notes |
|---|---|---|
| Antonio Maria Baca | Socorro | |
| Juan Cruz Baca | Valencia | |
| José Antonio Baca y Pino | Socorro | |
| Antonio Baca y Sisneros | San Miguel | |
| Henry Connelly | Bernalillo | |
| George Gold | Taos | |
| José Francisco Leiba | Bernalillo | Died prior to session |
| José Antonio Manzanares | Rio Arriba | |
| José Maria Martinez | Taos | |
| Vicente Martinez | Taos | |
| Tomas Ortiz | Santa Fe | |
| James H. Quinn | Taos | |
| Francisco Sandoval | Doña Ana | |
| José Ulibarri | San Miguel | |

== House of Representatives ==
- Speaker: Theodore D. Wheaton

| Name | District | Notes |
|---|---|---|
| Jose Apodaca | Socorro | |
| Diego Archuleta | Rio Arriba | |
| Manuel Armijo y Mestas | Bernalillo | |
| Faustin Baca | San Miguel | |
| Juan Maria Baca | San Miguel | |
| Jose Baca y Delgado | Santa Fe | |
| Alvino Chacon | Taos | |
| Damasio Chavez | Valencia | |
| Juan Gutierrez | San Miguel | |
| Lafayette Head | Rio Arriba | |
| Geronimo Jaramillo | Rio Arriba | |
| Jose Jaramillo | Valencia | |
| Inocencio Martinez | Taos | |
| Pascual Martinez | Taos | |
| Miguel Montoya | Santa Ana | Seated December 14, 1853 |
| Facundo Pino | Santa Fe | |
| J. Serafin Ramirez | Bernalillo | |
| Andrés Romero | Socorro | |
| Juan Antonio Ruival | Rio Arriba | |
| Jesus Sandoval | Santa Ana | Seat vacated December 8, 1853 |
| Caleb Sherman | Santa Fe | |
| Charles L. Spencer | Santa Fe | |
| Philetus M. Thompson | Doña Ana | |
| Murray F. Tuley | Bernalillo | |
| Celedonio Valdez | Rio Arriba | |
| José Maria Valdez | Taos | |
| Theodore D. Wheaton | Taos | |

The seat for Santa Ana County was contested because of Pueblo Indian votes cast for Sandoval, who received the certificate of election. As US law then generally denied voting rights to Indians, the House concluded that these votes were illegal and awarded the seat to Montoya. A minority tried to argue that the Treaty of Guadalupe Hidalgo provided that Mexicans who remained in the ceded territories were considered US citizens by default if they did not opt otherwise within a year, and because the Puebloans had been permitted to vote in Mexico they should be considered to have citizenship and the franchise as a result.
