= 11th New Mexico Territorial Legislature =

The 11th New Mexico Territorial Legislature met in Santa Fe from December 2, 1861, to January 30, 1862.

== Territorial Council ==
- President: Facundo Pino

Name	District
Francisco Tomas Cabeza de Baca	Santa Ana
Antonio Baca y Baca	San Miguel
Prudencio Lopez	San Miguel
Tomas Lucero	Mora
José Antonio Martinez	Taos
Pascual Martinez	Taos
Francisco Antonio Mestas	Rio Arriba
Diego Antonio Montoya	Bernalillo
Facundo Pino	Santa Fe
Francisco Salazar	Rio Arriba
Manuel Sanchez y Castillo	Valencia
José Antonio Torres	Socorro

== House of Representatives ==
- Speaker: José Manuel Gallegos

Name	District
Faustin Baca	San Miguel
Pablo Baca	Bernalillo
Pascual Baca	San Miguel
Rumaldo Baca	Socorro
José Miguel Bernadet	Mora
José Dario Gallegos	Taos
José Manuel Gallegos	Santa Fe
Estevan Garcia	Taos
José Antonio Garcia	Bernalillo
José de Jesus Garcia	Socorro
Vicente Garcia	Santa Fe
Manuel Gonzales	San Miguel
Luciano de Herrera	Rio Arriba
Perfecto C. Hidalgo	Valencia
Oliver P. Hovey	Santa Fe
Manuel Jaramillo	Rio Arriba
Romulo Lucero	San Miguel
Juan Montoya	Valencia
Pablo Perea	Bernalillo
Juan Antonio Samora	Taos
Manuel Antonio Sanchez	Taos
Patricio Silva	Santa Ana
Felipe Tafoya	Mora
Pablo Valdez	Rio Arriba

As with the previous two legislatures, no members in either house were present to represent Doña Ana County during the session.
