= New Mexico Territorial Legislature =

The Legislative Assembly of the Territory of New Mexico served as the legislative body of the New Mexico Territory during its period under US federal government administration prior to statehood. It was the successor to the General Assembly of the Territory of New Mexico under the 1846 provisional government, and was replaced by the New Mexico Legislature when New Mexico achieved statehood in 1912.

The Legislative Assembly was a bicameral legislature consisting of a lower house, the House of Representatives, and an upper house, the Council. The Act of Congress to establish the territory and settle its boundaries with Texas provided for a Council of 13 members and a House with 26 members. Members of the Council originally served two-year terms while House members were elected for one year, but in 1869 Congress dictated that territorial legislatures should only meet every two years, meaning that both houses were elected to serve only one session. The size of the body was reduced to a Council of 12 members and a House of 24 members in 1880.

== Legislative sessions ==
The Legislative Assembly met in Santa Fe, New Mexico, originally in the Palace of the Governors. After 1900, it moved to a new territorial capitol, today the Bataan Memorial Building.

Session	Year
1st New Mexico Territorial Legislature	1851-52
2nd New Mexico Territorial Legislature	1852-53
3rd New Mexico Territorial Legislature	1853-54
4th New Mexico Territorial Legislature	1854-55
5th New Mexico Territorial Legislature	1855-56
6th New Mexico Territorial Legislature	1856-57
7th New Mexico Territorial Legislature	1857-58
8th New Mexico Territorial Legislature	1858-59
9th New Mexico Territorial Legislature	1859-60
10th New Mexico Territorial Legislature	1860-61
11th New Mexico Territorial Legislature	1861-62
12th New Mexico Territorial Legislature	1862-63
13th New Mexico Territorial Legislature	1863-64
14th New Mexico Territorial Legislature	1864-65
15th New Mexico Territorial Legislature	1865-66
16th New Mexico Territorial Legislature	1866-67
17th New Mexico Territorial Legislature	1867-68
18th New Mexico Territorial Legislature	1868-69
19th New Mexico Territorial Legislature	1869-70
20th New Mexico Territorial Legislature	1871-72
21st New Mexico Territorial Legislature	1873-74
22nd New Mexico Territorial Legislature	1875-76
23rd New Mexico Territorial Legislature	1878
24th New Mexico Territorial Legislature	1880
25th New Mexico Territorial Legislature	1882
26th New Mexico Territorial Legislature	1884
27th New Mexico Territorial Legislature	1887
28th New Mexico Territorial Legislature	1889
29th New Mexico Territorial Legislature	1891
30th New Mexico Territorial Legislature	1893
31st New Mexico Territorial Legislature	1895
32nd New Mexico Territorial Legislature	1897
33rd New Mexico Territorial Legislature	1899
34th New Mexico Territorial Legislature	1901
35th New Mexico Territorial Legislature	1903
36th New Mexico Territorial Legislature	1904
37th New Mexico Territorial Legislature	1907
38th New Mexico Territorial Legislature	1909

== See also ==
- List of New Mexico state legislatures
