= 1st New Mexico Territorial Legislature =

The 1st New Mexico Territorial Legislature met in Santa Fe for two separate 40-day sessions. The first session was from June 3, 1851, to July 12, 1851, and prescribed that future legislative sessions would begin on the first Monday in December. Accordingly, the second session was held from December 1, 1851, to January 9, 1852.

== Territorial Council ==
- President (1st session): Juan Felipe Ortiz
- President (2nd session): Antonio José Martínez

Name	District
Tomas Cabeza de Baca	3
Florentino Castillo	4
Juan Cristoval Chavez	4
José Manuel Gallegos	3
Pablo Gallegos	1
George Gold	1
José Francisco Leiba	2
Antonio José Martínez	1
Vicente Martinez	1
Antonio Ortiz	1
Juan Felipe Ortiz	2
Francisco Antonio Otero	4
Hugh N. Smith	2

== House of Representatives ==
- Speaker: Theodore D. Wheaton

Name	District	Notes
Juan Cristoval Armijo	Bernalillo	
Merrill Ashurst	Santa Fe	Elected to 2nd session
Juan Cruz Baca	Valencia	
Spruce M. Baird	Bernalillo	
Robert T. Brent	Santa Fe	Elected to 2nd session, but killed en route
José Maria Chavez	Rio Arriba	Elected to 2nd session
Raymundo Cordova	Taos	
William J. Davy	Rio Arriba	Elected to 2nd session
Dionicio Gonzales	Taos	
Hilario Gonzales	San Miguel	
Geronimo Jaramillo	Rio Arriba	
Jose Antonio Manzanares	Rio Arriba	Resigned after 1st session
Pascual Martinez	Taos	
Miguel Mascareñas	Taos	
Candido Ortiz	Santa Fe	Primarily attended 1st session
Tomas Ortiz	Santa Fe	
José Leandro Perea	Bernalillo	
Palmer J. Pillans	Santa Fe	
Diego Salazar	Rio Arriba	
Juan José Sanchez	Valencia	
José Antonio Sandoval	Santa Anna	
Miguel Sena y Quintana	San Miguel	
Miguel Sena y Romero	San Miguel	
William C. Skinner	Valencia	Died prior to 2nd session
Juan Torres	Socorro	
John R. Tulles	Santa Fe	Resigned after 1st session
Celedonio Valdez	Rio Arriba	
Esquipula Vigil	Socorro	
Ramon Vigil	Rio Arriba	Resigned after 1st session
Theodore D. Wheaton	Taos	
