= Miguel Antonio Otero =

Miguel Antonio Otero may refer to:

- Miguel Antonio Otero (born 1829) (1829–1882), prominent politician of the New Mexico Territory, delegate to the U.S. Congress
- Miguel Antonio Otero (born 1859) (1859–1944), son of previous, governor of New Mexico Territory
- Miguel Antonio Otero Jr. (1892–1977), son of previous, district court judge in Santa Fe, New Mexico, husband of aviator Katherine Stinson
