= Antonio Jose Otero =

American judge (1809–1870)

Antonio Jose Otero (March 13, 1809 – November 20, 1870) was a justice of the New Mexico Territorial Supreme Court from 1846 until 1851. He was the only man of Spanish heritage who held a position on the supreme court of New Mexico territory.

Antonio Jose Otero was born on March 13, 1809, in the town of Valencia, New Mexico to Vicente Otero and Gertrudes Chaves. His grandfather was Pedro Otero, who came to Santa Fe around 1776. Antonio Jose's brother was Miguel Antonio Otero.

On September 22, 1846, General Stephen W. Kearny, pursuant to authorization from President James K. Polk, appointed a variety of territorial officials, naming Joab Houghton, Charles H. Beaubien, and Otero to the territorial supreme court. He presided over the third district court, which, at that time, included southern New Mexico and the territory of Arizona. After his service on the court, Otero served as delegate to Congress from the territory. In 1860, he was one of the incorporators of the New Mexican Railway Company.

Otero died at his home in Peralta, New Mexico, at the age of 60.

Political offices
| Preceded by Newly established seat | Justice of the New Mexico Territorial Supreme Court; 1846–1851 | Succeeded by John Sebrie Watts |
