= John Sebrie Watts =

American politician

Member of the U.S. House of Representatives from New Mexico Territory's At-large district
- In office March 4, 1861 – March 3, 1863 (Delegate)
- Preceded by: Miguel Otero
- Succeeded by: Francisco Perea

Associate Justice of the U.S. Court of the Territory of New Mexico
- In office 1851–1854

Indiana House of Representatives
- In office 1846–1847

Personal details
- Born: January 19, 1816 Boone County, Kentucky
- Died: June 11, 1876 (aged 60) Bloomington, Indiana
- Party: Republican
- Education: Indiana University
- Occupation: lawyer

John Sebrie Watts (January 19, 1816 – June 11, 1876) was an American attorney, jurist, and politician who held office in the state of Indiana and in the territory of New Mexico.

== Early life and education ==
Watts was born in Boone County, Kentucky. The youngest of 11 children, Watts was raised in Indiana. He graduated from Indiana College (which later became Indiana University) in 1835, studied law, was admitted to the bar, and became a practicing attorney.

== Career ==
Watts served as a member of the Indiana House of Representatives in 1846 and 1847. He then became an associate justice of the United States court in the territory of New Mexico in 1851. In 1854, Watts resigned his post and returned to the practice of law.

Watts was elected as a Republican delegate to the Thirty-seventh Congress (March 4, 1861 – March 3, 1863). He was also a delegate to the 1864 Republican National Convention. Watts helped to equip troops for the Union Army during the Civil War.

On July 11, 1868, Watts was appointed chief justice of the New Mexico Territorial Supreme Court by President Andrew Johnson. Watts served on the Territorial Supreme Court for one year and then practiced law in Santa Fe. He also engaged in land speculation, and one of his land purchases led to a decades-long legal battle culminating in a 1914 U.S. Supreme Court decision.

== Personal life and death ==
In 1837, Watts married Elizabeth Howe. John and Elizabeth Watts had three children: Joshua Watts, John Watts Jr., and Fannie (Watts) Bancroft.

Watts died in Bloomington, Indiana on June 11, 1876, and was interred in Rose Hill Cemetery.

U.S. House of Representatives
Preceded by Miguel A. Otero	Delegate to the U.S. House of Representatives from New Mexico; 1861-1863	Succeeded by Francisco Perea
Political offices
Preceded by Antonio Jose Otero; John P. Slough	Justice of the New Mexico Territorial Supreme Court; 1851–1857; 1868–1869	Succeeded by Perry E. Brocchus; Joseph G. Palen
