= Duff Armstrong =

American murder suspect defended by Abraham Lincoln (1833–1899)

William Armstrong
- Born: 1833
- Died: 1899 (aged 65–66)
- Other name: Duff Armstrong
- Known for: Murder trial and defense by Abraham Lincoln

William "Duff" Armstrong (c. 1833–1899) was an American Union Army soldier and the defendant in an 1858 murder prosecution in which he was defended by Abraham Lincoln, two years before Lincoln was elected President of the United States. The case would later be loosely portrayed in the 1939 film Young Mr. Lincoln.

== Early life ==
Armstrong was born to Jack and Hannah Armstrong. Jack died in 1857. Abraham Lincoln was a friend of the Armstrongs and regularly visited and would cradle baby William.

== Murder trial ==
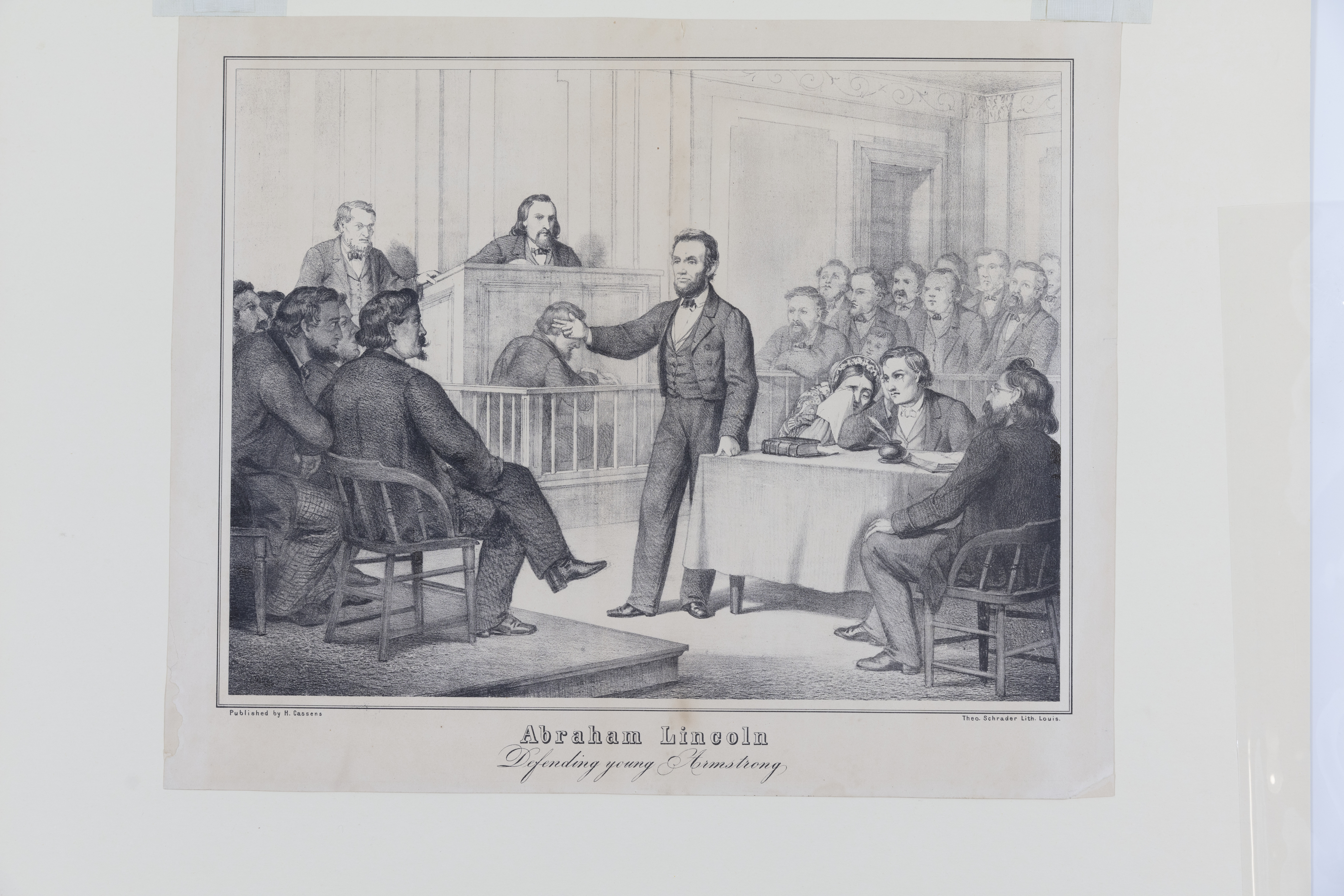
Abraham Lincoln defending young Armstrong

Armstrong was charged with the August 29, 1857, murder of James Preston Metzker in Mason County, Illinois. It was alleged that Armstrong and another man had argued with Metzker and killed him with several blows to the head. Armstrong's father, Jack Armstrong, had been a friend of Lincoln while he was studying law in New Salem, Illinois. When Lincoln heard of the murder charge, he wrote to Jack's widow, Hannah, and volunteered his legal services pro bono. The trial was moved to Cass County and held at the courthouse at Beardstown, Illinois.

I have just heard of your deep affliction, and the arrest of your son for murder. I can hardly believe he can be capable of the crime alleged against him. It does not seem possible. I am anxious that he should be given a fair trial at any rate; and gratitude for your long-continued kindness to me in adverse circumstances prompts me to offer my humble services gratuitously in his behalf. It will afford me an opportunity to requite, in a small degree, the favors I received at your hand, and that of your lamented husband, when your roof afforded me a grateful shelter, without money and without price.

— Abraham Lincoln's letter to Hannah Armstrong,

Armstrong's co-accused, a Mr. Norris, was tried separately from him. He was found guilty of Metzker's murder and sentenced to eight years in a state prison. Armstrong's trial began on May 8, 1858.

Witness Charles Allen testified that he saw Duff Armstrong strike Metzker with a slungshot. Under cross-examination, Lincoln pushed for further detail and Charles Allen testified that he was at a distance of 150 feet, but could clearly see the act by the light of the moon. Abraham Lincoln used judicial notice, then a very uncommon tactic, to show Allen lied on the stand when he claimed he had witnessed the crime in the moonlight. Lincoln produced an almanac to show that the moon on that date would not have provided enough light for the witness to see anything clearly. Lincoln also presented evidence to show that the injuries to Metzker's head could have been inflicted by Norris alone. Based on this evidence, the jury acquitted Armstrong after only one ballot.

A story arose many years later that Lincoln had modified the almanac, but this was refuted by Abram Bergen, who had witnessed the trial as a young attorney, and later served as a justice of the New Mexico territorial supreme court. From Bergen's recollection, the prosecution had objected upon Lincoln's demonstration from the almanac, and compared it to an almanac in their own possession, only to find that Lincoln's was genuine.

Edward Eggleston would use the murder and trial as the basis for his 1888 novel The Graysons. Eggleston moved the action from the 1850s to the 1830s; Young Mr. Lincoln later did the same.

== Service in the Civil War ==
Armstrong went on to join the Union forces in the American Civil War. He became ill in 1863 and, at his mother's request, Lincoln arranged for Armstrong's discharge.

== Death and burial ==
Armstrong lived long after the war; his death was reported in The New York Times on May 14, 1899.

William Duff Armstrong is buried in the New Hope Cemetery in Mason County, IL. A small informational plaque is erected at his gravesite which reads, "WILLIAM DUFF ARMSTRONG accused slayer of Preston Metzker, May 7, 1858 freed by Lincoln in Almanac Trial".
