= Santacafé =

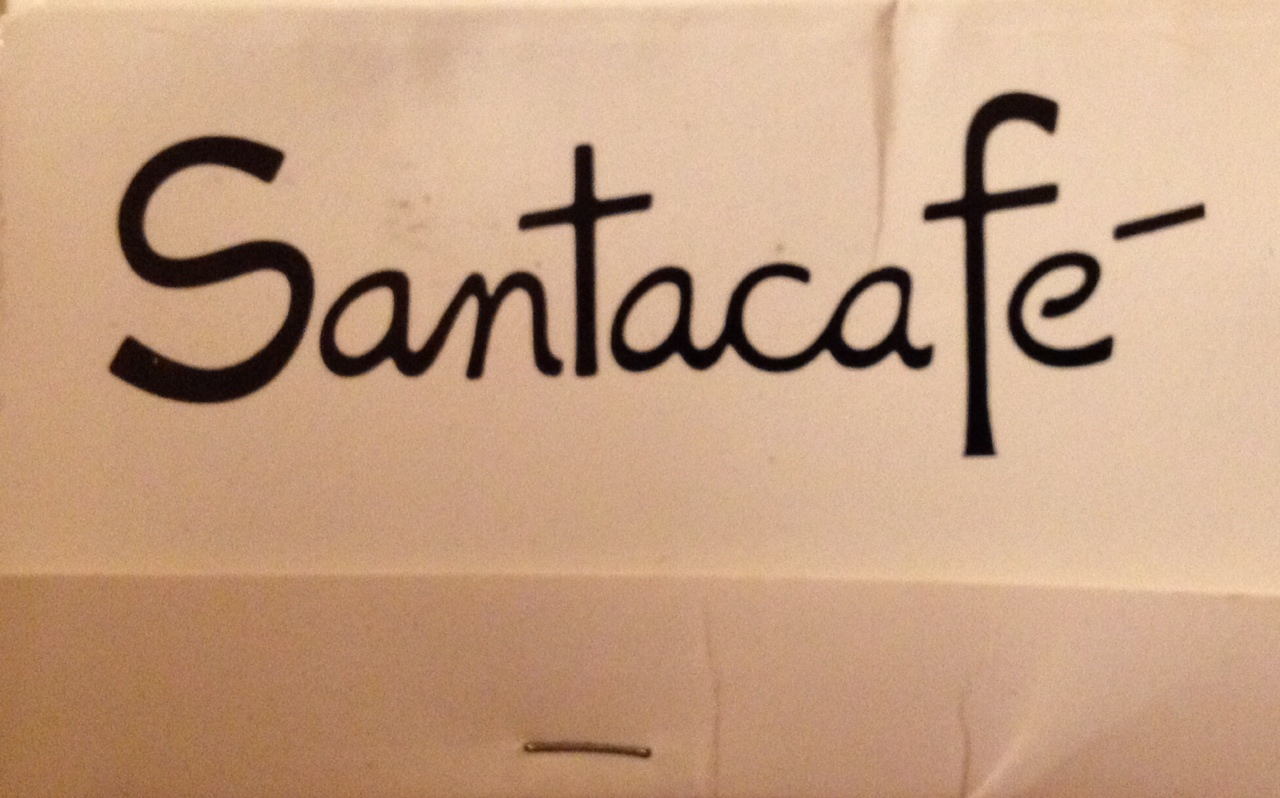
- Santacafé matchbook circa 1994
- Interactive map of Santacafé

Restaurant information
- Established: 1983
- Owner: Quinn Stevenson
- Head chef: Dale Kester
- Food type: new American
- Location: 231 Washington Ave., Santa Fe, New Mexico, 87501, United States
- Coordinates: 35°41′24″N 105°56′10″W
- Other information: Phone: 505-984-1788
- Website: Santacafe.com

Santacafé is a new American restaurant located in Santa Fe, New Mexico in the United States. The restaurant is located in the former home of José Manuel Gallegos.

== Background ==
The restaurant, which is located in a historic building that was once the home of congressional delegate José Manuel Gallegos, has kiva style fireplaces and courtyard dining. The interior has been described as minimalistic. The interior has a close seating arrangement and was described as being "close together, so don't plan on sharing anything intimate that you don't mind sharing with the class," by the Denver Post. Ming Tsai is the former executive chef. Martin Anton became executive chef in 2012. The restaurant was chosen as one of Giada De Laurentiis favorite restaurants in Santa Fe on Giada's Weekend Getaways. In 1998, Tom Ford named the restaurant one of his favorites in Santa Fe. Former chef Ángel Estrada left the restaurant to start his own restaurant, The MidTown Bistro, in 2013. He had worked at Santacafé for 18 years.

== Cuisine ==
Dale Kester continues Santacafe's tradition of serving high-quality New American Cuisine with New Mexican and international influences.
