= Abram Bergen =

American judge (c. 1836–1906)

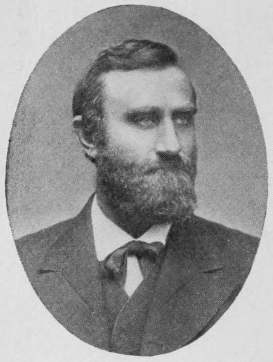

Justice of the New Mexico Territorial Supreme Court
- In office 1869–1870

Member of the Minnesota Senate
- In office 1868–1869

Personal details
- Born: March 1836 Morgan County, Illinois
- Died: February 5, 1906 (aged 69) Topeka, Kansas
- Education: Illinois College
- Occupation: Lawyer

Abram Bergen (often misreported with first name Abraham or last name Berger; March 1836 – February 5, 1906) was an American lawyer who served as a justice of the New Mexico Territorial Supreme Court from 1869 to 1870.

== Biography ==
Abram Bergen was born on a farm in Morgan County, Illinois in March 1836. He earned a bachelor's degree from Illinois College, and attended Harvard Law School, but did not graduate.

As a young attorney, he witnessed the "Almanac trial", in which Abraham Lincoln, as counsel for criminal defendant Duff Armstrong, won his case by using an almanac to demonstrate that the prosecution witness was lying about there being a full moon enabling him to see clearly on the night of the crime. Later in life, Bergen confirmed in an interview that Lincoln had not modified the almanac, as some stories claimed. As of 1869, Bergen was serving in the Minnesota Senate.

On April 13, 1869, it was reported that Bergen was among the nominees sent to Congress by the administration of President Ulysses S. Grant, having been nominated for a seat on the New Mexico territorial supreme court. Bergen was appointed from Fillmore County, Minnesota.

Bergen served on the New Mexico court for only a year before returning east, moving to Garnett, Kansas, where "Bergen and L. K. Kirk formed a partnership, and together they practiced law for some time". Eventually, the partnership dissolved, and Bergen settled in Topeka, Kansas, in 1882. At the time of his death, Bergen was described as "one of the best-known and most successful lawyers of the state", and "in the front rank in the legal profession", with a practice that "was not confined to Kansas, for his legal ability was known far and wide".

Bergen died at his home in Topeka, after a brief illness. His death was caused by pneumonia and heart trouble, and it was reported that he had been ailing about three weeks, but was seriously sick for only a few days.

Political offices
Preceded by Joab Houghton	Justice of the New Mexico Territorial Supreme Court; 1869–1870	Succeeded by Benjamin J. Waters
