= 35th New Mexico Territorial Legislature =

The 35th New Mexico Territorial Legislature met in Santa Fe from January 19, 1903, to March 19, 1903.

== Territorial Council ==
- President: J. Francisco Chaves

Name	District	Party
George F. Albright	5	Republican
Willam H. Andrews	7	Republican
Amado Chaves	5	Republican
J. Francisco Chaves	6	Republican
James S. Duncan	2	Republican
Albert B. Fall	9	Republican
W.A. Hawkins	8	Republican
Thomas Hughes	5	Republican
Venceslao Jaramillo	3	Republican
Malaquias Martinez	3	Republican
Saturnino Pinard	1	Republican
Charles A. Spiess	2	Republican

== House of Representatives ==
- Speaker: Nestor Montoya

Name	District	Party
Roman L. Baca	5	Republican
Alex Bowie	9	Republican
W.H. Coleman	4	Republican
Carl A. Dalies	10	Republican
Gregorio Gutierres	4	Republican
H.H. Howard	11	Republican
William Kilpatrick	5	Republican
William H. H. Llewellyn	12	Republican
David Martinez Jr.	8	Republican
Eduardo Martinez	4	Democrat
W.F. McCash	3	Republican
W.A. McIvers	15	Democrat
Néstor Montoya	9	Republican
Domingo A. Ortega	11	Republican
Granville Pendleton	8	Republican
A.W. Pollard	14	Republican
Pedro Romero	4	Republican
Cristobal Sanchez	2	Republican
Martin Sanchez	10	Republican
Pedro Sanchez	6	Republican
Celso Sandoval	9	Republican
M.B. Stockton	1	Republican
R.M. Turner	13	Republican
Antonio D. Vargas	7	Republican
