= Black Republican =

Black Republican may refer to:

- "Black Republican", a pejorative name applied to abolitionist members of the United States' Republican Party before the Civil War; see History of the Republican Party (United States) § Beginnings: 1854–1860
- Various organizations with African-American membership:
  - A member of the Negro Republican Party, a faction of the United States Republican Party in the South during and following the Civil War
  - Black-and-tan faction, a faction of the United States Republican Party in the South from the 1870s to the 1960s in opposition to the segregationist 'lily-white movement'
  - National Black Republican Association, founded in 2005
- Black Republican cherry, a type of cherry
- Black Republican (song), from Nas's eighth album, Hip-Hop Is Dead

== See also ==
- Black conservatism in the United States
- Hip Hop Republican, a combined music and politics blog
- List of African-American Republicans
- List of African-American officeholders during Reconstruction
