= Richard Hanson Weightman =

American politician and military officer (1816–1861)

Richard W. Weightman
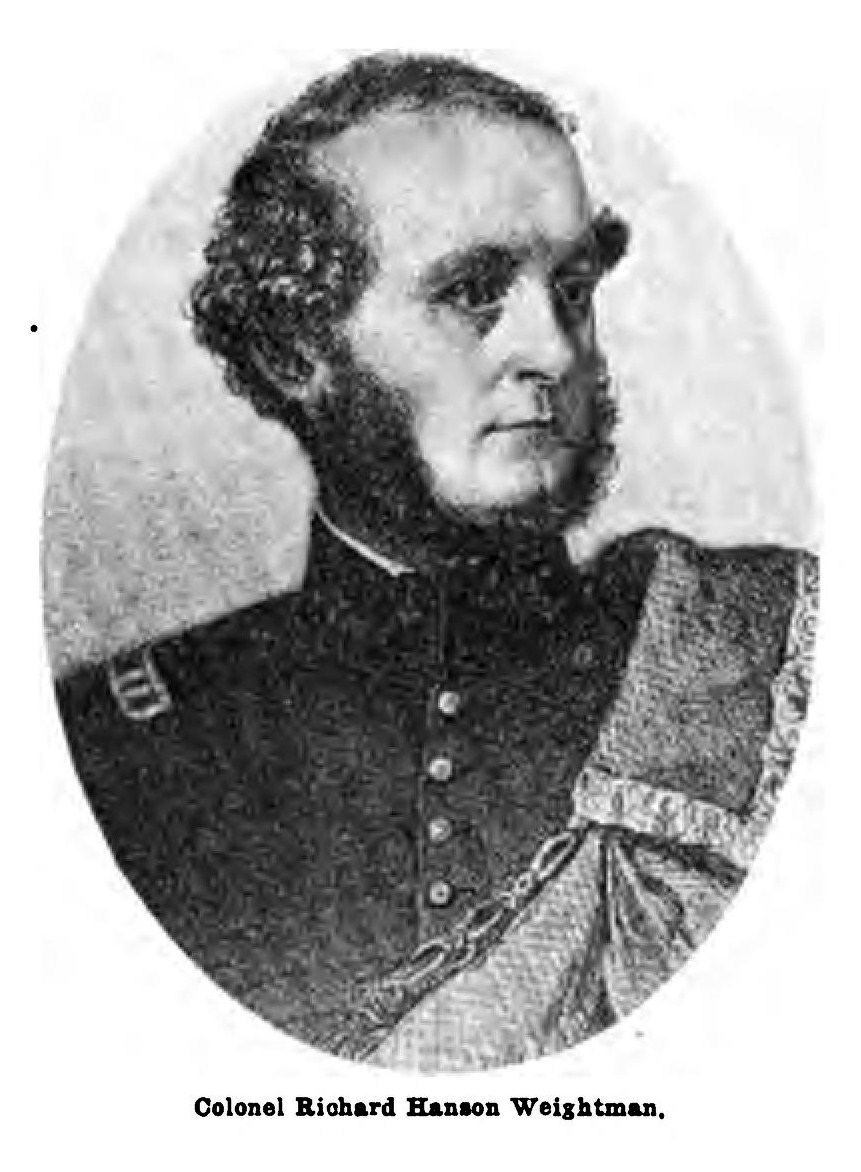

Delegate to the U.S. House of Representatives from New Mexico Territory's at-large district
- In office March 4, 1851 – March 3, 1853
- Preceded by: William S. Messervy
- Succeeded by: José Manuel Gallegos

Personal details
- Born: Richard Hanson Weightman; December 28, 1816 Washington, D.C.
- Died: August 10, 1861 (aged 44) near Springfield, Missouri
- Resting place: Springfield, Missouri
- Party: Democratic
- Spouse: Susan Bradford Coxe
- Parent: Roger C. Weightman (father)
- Education: University of Virginia
- Occupation: Newspaper editor

Military service
- Allegiance: United States; Confederate States of America
- Branch/service: United States Army
- Years of service: 1846–1849 (U.S.); 1861 (C.S.)
- Rank: Major (U.S.); Colonel (C.S.)
- Unit: Missouri State Guard
- Battles/wars: Mexican–American War; Battle of the Sacramento River; American Civil War; Battle of Carthage, Missouri; Battle of Wilson's Creek†

Richard Hanson Weightman (December 28, 1816 – August 10, 1861) was an antebellum delegate to the United States Congress from the Territory of New Mexico, serving one term from 1851 to 1853. He was also a district commander of the secessionist Missouri State Guard during the American Civil War, and was killed in action at the Battle of Wilson's Creek in Missouri.

== Early life and education ==
Born in Washington, D.C., where his father Roger C. Weightman later served as mayor, Weightman attended private schools there and in Alexandria, Virginia. He graduated from the University of Virginia at Charlottesville in 1834 and attended the United States Military Academy at West Point, 1835–1837, but was expelled for contemplating a duel. He subsequently studied law and was admitted to the bar in 1841 in the District of Columbia, but did not practice.

== Mexican-American War ==
Weightman moved to St. Louis, Missouri, and on May 28, 1846, was elected captain of Clark's Battalion, Missouri Volunteer Light Artillery, in the Mexican War, later fighting in the Battle of Sacramento. He served as Additional Paymaster, Volunteers, in the Army in 1848 and 1849 and left the service as a Major.

== Later career ==
He moved to New Mexico Territory in 1851. He edited a newspaper in Santa Fe, the Santa Fe Gazette, and another in Albuquerque, the Amigo Pais. He was appointed agent for Indians in New Mexico in July 1851.

=== Fight with F.X. Aubry ===
While in Santa Fe in August 1854, he killed François Xavier Aubry (December 3, 1824 – August 18, 1854) who was a French Canadian merchant and explorer of the American Southwest. When Aubry drew his revolver, Weightman stabbed Aubry with a Bowie knife.

=== Congressional delegate ===
Weightman was elected as a Democrat as the New Mexico Territory's Delegate to the Thirty-second Congress (March 4, 1851 – March 3, 1853). He was not a candidate for reelection in 1852.

== Civil War ==
After leaving Congress, he went back to newspaper work. In 1858 he moved to Kickapoo and Atchison, Kansas, and in 1861 to Independence, Missouri.

On June 11, 1861, Weightman was elected as colonel of the First Regiment Cavalry, Eighth Division, Missouri State Guard, Confederate States Army. He was promoted to command of the First Brigade, Eighth Division, June 20, 1861, and led it competently at the Battle of Carthage on July 5, 1861.

=== Death and burial ===
Colonel Richard Hanson Weightman was killed while leading his brigade at the Battle of Wilson's Creek in Missouri on August 10, 1861, and was buried on the battlefield near Springfield, Missouri.

== Notes ==
U.S. House of Representatives
Preceded by (none)	Delegate to the U.S. House of Representatives from New Mexico; 1851–1853	Succeeded by José Manuel Gallegos
