= United States provisional government of New Mexico =

Former governmental organization headquartered in Santa Fe

Territory of New Mexico
- Unorganized Territory of the United States
- 1846–1850
- Flag (1848–1851)
- Capital: Santa Fe
- Government
  - Type: Appointed Military and Civilian Governors under Kearny Code
- History
  - Mexican–American War: April 25, 1846
  - Capture of Santa Fe: August 15 1846
  - Kearny Code: September 22, 1846
  - Taos Revolt: January 19, 1847–July 9, 1847
  - Treaty of Guadalupe Hidalgo: May 30, 1848
  - State constitution (overturned): June 20, 1850
  - Organic Act (part of Compromise of 1850): September 9 1850
Preceded by	Succeeded by
Santa Fe de Nuevo México	New Mexico Territory

Under the provisions of the Kearny Code as promulgated in 1846, the first legislature of New Mexico commenced its session on December 6, 1847. The Council consisted of seven members, with Antonio Sandoval, of Bernalillo County, as president, and the House of twenty-one members, with W. Z. Angney as speaker.

It passed an act providing for a convention to consider a permanent form of government for New Mexico, and the delegates for this purpose met on October 10, 1848. It adopted a memorandum to Congress asking for a regular territorial government, and declared against the introduction of domestic slavery.

In the next year the military governor called an election for delegates to a convention to frame a territorial form of government.

Meanwhile, Texas, which claimed all the territory east of the Rio Grande, sent Spruce M. Baird, as judge to organize that district into a county to be called Santa Fe. But he was received with such opposition that he did not attempt to carry his instructions into effect. In the spring of 1850, they sent a second commissioner, Robert S. Neighbors, to organize counties of the state of Texas and to hold elections in them of local officers.

This created some excitement, but produced no practical result. Almost at the same time, however, it became well known that the President Zachary Taylor and his cabinet at Washington desired the people of California and New Mexico to organize state governments without delay, in order to settle the question of slavery within their borders, and thus allay the great national excitement on the subject.

A convention was consequently called by Colonel John Munroe, the military governor, which met on May 15, and adopted a state constitution. This constitution included a declaration against slavery in the new state, and the appreciation shown of the value of public education. In New Mexico's first constitutional convention, native New Mexicans notably composed over ninety per cent of the membership, even though this placed their rights to self-government in jeopardy.

This constitution was submitted to the people on the 20th of June, and adopted with substantial unanimity. At the same time state officers and a legislature were elected, Henry Connelly being chosen governor, Manuel Álvarez as lieutenant-governor, and William S. Messervy as member of the United States House of Representatives. The state legislature met on July 1, 1850, and elected as United States senators Francis A. Cunningham and Richard H. Weightman, but while Weightman was on his way to Washington to claim his seat in the senate the famous compromise measures of 1850 were passed by Congress, one feature of which was the act organizing New Mexico as a territory, with boundaries including the areas now embraced in New Mexico, Arizona, and southern Colorado. This organic act was passed September 9, 1850.

In general, the leader of the native New Mexicans favored statehood, while the American pioneer element wanted a Territorial organization. At the time, territorial officials were appointed by the President; in a State they are elected by the people.

== Judicial branch ==
In 1846, General Stephen W. Kearny set up a provisional government and system of laws, the "Kearny Code." The Judicial branch consisted of a three-man Superior Court. Judges served in a dual capacity. Each was a trial judge, presiding over a judicial district; together they constituted an appellate court, reviewing their individual decisions.

At the new American court's first session in Taos in April 1847, 17 men were tried for murder, 5 for high treason, and 17 for larceny. Convicted: 15 of murder, one of treason, and 6 of larceny. Every man convicted of homicide was hanged, according to Henry Weihofen.

Prior to United States occupation, the political subdivisions were those created in 1844 by the Departmental Council of Mexico which established seven counties in three districts: Taos and Rio Arriba counties in the Northern district; Santa Fe, San Miguel and Santa Ana counties in the Central district; and Bernalillo and Valencia counties in the Southeastern district. These county names were retained after the occupation of the U.S. although there were county boundary changes. In 1847 the General Assembly of the Territory of New Mexico passed an "Act Regulating the Holding of Circuit Courts." Three circuits were established: The Central, the Northern, and the Southeastern.
