= National Black Republican Association =

American political organization

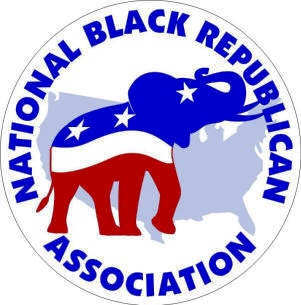
NBRA logo

The National Black Republican Association (NBRA) American political organization associated with and supportive of the Republican Party. It was founded in 2005 by Frances Rice, a retired Lieutenant Colonel and attorney of the U.S. Army. Rice is currently the Chairman of the NBRA.
