= Spiegelberg Brothers =

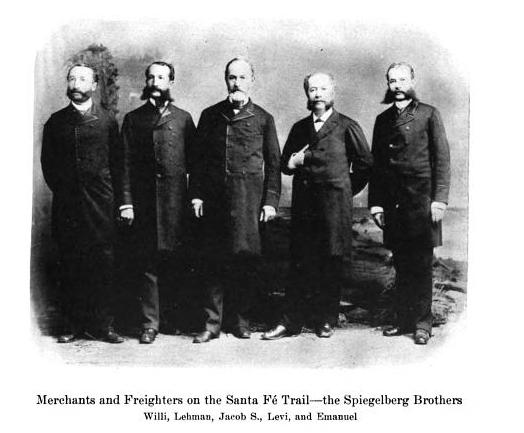
SpiegelbergBros

The Spiegelberg Brothers or the House of Spiegelberg Brothers, Santa Fe Traders was founded by Soloman Jacob Spiegelberg and Levi Spiegelberg in 1848. It was a thriving wholesale merchant partnership which included a grocery and dry goods store across from the Governor's Palace It was the first Jewish mercantile company in Santa Fe. The Spiegelberg brothers expanded to include four other brothers. They served as sutlers to the American military and as Indian traders. They later established and were major stockholders in the Second National Bank of Santa Fe. The reach of their numerous investments and the bank have been described as a regional business empire, spreading across large parts of the Southwest. Investments included mining operations, insurance, and real estate ventures.

== Spiegelberg Family in New Mexico ==
Soloman Jacob Spielberg was the oldest of a family of ten children and the first to leave Germany. He arrived in Santa Fe via an ox train along the Santa Fe Trail. He worked there for E. Leitendorfer and company, or Houghton & Leidensdorfer Co. of St. Louis, until joining the Doniphan campaign to Chihuahua, for whom he may have acted as sutler. During the campaign, he used his savings and credit to outfit his goods and transportation, allowing him an opportunity to engage in southern trade. Following the war, he was appointed as sutler for the United States Army at Fort Marcy. Levi arrived in New Mexico in 1848, when Spigelberg Brothers was founded, followed by Elias (1850), Emmanuel (1853), Lehman (1857), and the youngest, Willi (1861). By 1852 Solomon Jacob was doing well enough to advance the territorial legislature four thousand dollars to pay its members salaries, until repaid within the following year. In addition to managing Spiegelberg Brothers, the brothers established themselves as traders with the Native Americans. The first trading license at Fort Defiance was issued to Lehman after the Navajos were moved to the reservation in the summer 1868. Willi was the first trader at Fort Wingate, also in the summer of 1868, and later became sutler to the Navajo Indian Agency.

Floyd S. Fierman wrote that the Spiegelbergs revolutionized the retail business and its territory, attracting many Spanish-Americans from the villages into the towns, where they could buy either for cash or on credit without feeling cheated, or losing their land if they fell behind in their payments. Willi's wife, Flora, recalled that all five brothers joined the Masonic order, and that in the early fifties, Solomon was among its first members.

Spiegelberg mining interests dated from the early 1860s. In 1861 Soloman Jacob and Levi joined investors incorporating the Montezuma Copper Mining Company of Santa Fé, New Mexico, and Lehman served on the board of directors of the Willison Silver Mining Company in 1872. Lehman's acquisition of the San Marcos Pueblo grant may have been stimulated by his interest in copper mining.

During the Civil War, Levi, while en route to Chihuahua with a wagon train of merchandise, was captured by General Henry Hopkins Sibley's Confederate forces near Socorro, within days following the Battle of Valverde. He was charged with being a Union spy, but was recognized by a former Secretary of the Territory of New Mexico, Colonel A. M. Jackson, and released. The brothers suffered heavy mercantile business losses during this New Mexico Campaign of 1862, especially in Albuquerque. However, they still managed to prosper through their government contracts, insurance and mining investments, and their Santa Fe banking and exchange house. The Spiegelbergs were appointed sutlers to the New Mexico Volunteers between July 1861 and July 1864. Flora Spiegelberg recalled that during the occupation of Santa Fe, more than fifty thousand dollars in merchandise passed from the Spiegelbergs into Confederate hands.

Until 1870, large merchants filled the role of the non-existent banks of New Mexico. Large purchases often involved the use of property as security, in essence, mortgage banking. The Spiegelbergs issued their own highly respected company scrip as substitutes for legal tender in 1863, when the territorial legislative assembly granted a provisional charter to create the Bank of New Mexico, but failed to gain congressional approval. Levi Spiegelberg was among the ten prominent New Mexicans seeking that charter. In 1870, the First National Bank of New Mexico received a charter under Lucien Maxwell in Santa Fe, which was taken over within months by Thomas B. Catron, one of the largest individual landholders in U.S. history, with Stephen Benton Elkins and others. The Spiegelbergs quickly formed the Second National Bank of New Mexico in 1872, with principal (and majority interest holding) stockholders, Lehman and Willie in Santa Fe, and Solomon and Levi, in New York.

The wealth of the Spiegelbergs may be compared to other prominent New Mexicans of the time. That reported by Ceran St. Vrain in 1860 was $200,000; the Dold brothers of Las Vegas, $76,500 each; Solomon Spiegelberg, $65,000. In 1870 Lucien Boneparte Maxwell's stated wealth was $170,000, while Lehman Speigelberg reported $77,000.

Elias accidentally died while he slept when a roof collapsed upon him. Beginning in the late 1860s and early 1870s most of the remaining brothers began moving to New York City where they continued their business practices. Lehman wrote the Commerce of Sta Fé, MS., a sketch of his journey across the plains, and his observations of trading matters in early times, with a general idea of the country's progress in other respects. Levi and wife Betty moved their family to New York, where Levi established L. Spiegelberg & Sons with sons Charles S. and William I., who married Beulah V. Guggenheim.

Willi served as the first mayor of Santa Fe (1884-1886). Willi's wife Flora left a diary with vivid descriptions of the cultural life of Santa Fe during the period. She began the town's first nonsectarian school for girls and also taught pupils in Hebrew school, including Arthur Seligman, future governor of New Mexico. In 1888 Willi moved his family to New York.
