= Francisco Perea =

American businessman and politician (1830–1913)

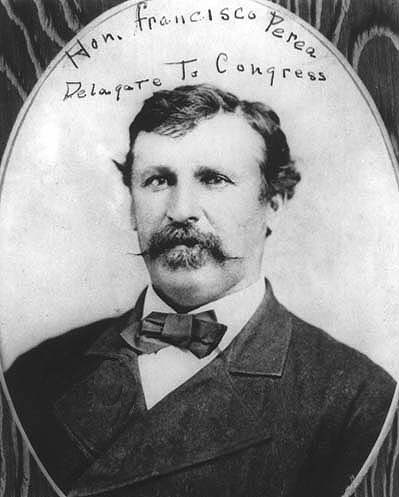

Member of the U.S. House of Representatives from New Mexico Territory's At-large district
- In office March 4, 1863 – March 3, 1865 (Delegate)
- Preceded by: John S. Watts
- Succeeded by: José Francisco Chaves

Personal details
- Born: Francisco Perea Chaves; January 9, 1830 Los Padillas, Nuevo México, First Mexican Republic (now Bernalillo County, New Mexico, U.S.)
- Died: May 21, 1913 (aged 83) Albuquerque, New Mexico, U.S.
- Resting place: Fairview Cemetery, New Mexico
- Party: Republican
- Relatives: Demi Lovato (great-great-great-granddaughter)
- Occupation: politician, businessman, postmaster

Military service
- Allegiance: United States
- Branch/service: (United States) Union Army
- Years of service: 1861–1862
- Rank: Lieutenant Colonel (U.S.)
- Commands: Perea's Battalion
- Battles/wars: American Civil War

Francisco Perea Chaves (January 9, 1830 – May 21, 1913) was an American businessman and politician, serving first in the House of the New Mexico Territory after the area's acquisition by the United States following the Mexican–American War. He was a cousin of Pedro Perea, and grandson of Governor Francisco Xavier Chávez, the first Governor (1822–1823) of the Departamento de Nuevo México under the independent First Mexican Empire. Perea had a trade network along the Santa Fe Trail between St. Louis and Mexico.

During the American Civil War, Perea was commissioned as a Union Army lieutenant colonel, helping to defend the Territory. He was elected to serve as a delegate for the Territory of New Mexico to the 38th United States Congress from March 4, 1863, to March 3, 1865. After the war he served again in the Territorial legislature, and then as US postmaster of Jemez Springs from 1894 to 1905.

== Biography ==
=== Early life and education ===
Perea was born January 9, 1830, in Los Padillas, New Mexico (then in the United Mexican States). This area is now within Bernalillo County, New Mexico, near Albuquerque. He was the third child of Juan Perea and his wife, Josefa Chaves de Perea, a family of Hispanos whose roots in the area dated to colonial era. He was a maternal grandson of Governor Francisco Xavier Chávez, the first Governor (1822–1823) of the Departamento de Nuevo México under the independent First Mexican Empire shortly after Mexican War of Independence from Spain ended in 1821. As a youth, Perea attended select schools in Bernalillo County from 1836 to 1837 and at Santa Fe from 1837 to 1839.

Perea attended the Jesuit College (now St. Louis University), St. Louis, Missouri, from 1843 to 1845. He received collegiate training at the Bank Street Academy in New York City 1847–1849. During this period, the Mexican–American War took place, ending with Mexico's defeat and its ceding the Southwest and California to the US. When Perea returned to New Mexico, it had been annexed by the US; Congress authorized it as a Territory in 1850 after Texas gave up its claims.

Before returning home, Perea and other classmates met President Zachary Taylor. Perea contracted cholera about this time, but he recovered.

=== Marriage and family ===
Shortly after his return from the east, Perea married Dolores Otero on March 15, 1851. They had a total of eighteen children, most of whom died as infants. On November 14, 1870, he married Gabriela Montoya.

=== Business and politics ===
Throughout the 1850s, Perea was engaged in stock raising and commercial pursuits. He transported merchandise by mule train along the Santa Fe Trail from St. Louis and Independence, Missouri, to Mexico. He also traveled to California, and had an extended trip to New York City during the 1850s.

In 1858 Perea was elected to represent Bernalillo County in the Territorial House. On December 31 of that year, he submitted the following letter:

"To the Hon. José Guadalupe Gallegos Speaker of the House of Representatives: SIR: To the resolution of the House, asking me to give my reasons for declining to take a seat in that Hon. House, as a member from the county of Bernalillo, I have the honor to respond: In the first place, I never consented to my name being placed before the people as a candidate for the office to which I was elected and secondly, I would inform the House, that the health of my family, makes my presence absolutely indispensable. I was not aware that it was my duty to resign after I had been elected, or I would have done so, in order to give the people of my county an opportunity to elect another in my place. With assurances to the Hon. House, that I would be very happy to accompany them in providing for the good of our common country, if the matters above mentioned would permit me. I am, Mr. Speaker with much respect, Your Obd. Servant, FRANCISCO PEREA" The communication was adopted and Francisco Perea was excused from attending the House during the 1858 session.

=== Civil War service and territorial delegate ===
When the American Civil War broke out, Perea traveled across the Territory of New Mexico to garner support for the Union cause. President Abraham Lincoln authorized the establishment of two regiments and four battalions for the defense of the New Mexico Territory. Perea was commissioned as a lieutenant colonel. In December 1861, he organized one of the battalions, which came to be known as Perea's Battalion. It was stationed at Albuquerque during the winters of 1861 and 1862. He commanded the unit to defend New Mexico against the Texas Rangers and Navajo. Perea took part in the Battle of Glorieta Pass, in March 1862, where the Union defeated Confederate forces.

Perea resigned from the battalion and worked to repair his home, destroyed during the war. He was elected in 1862 as a Republican Territorial delegate to the Thirty-Eighth Congress, serving from March 4, 1863, to March 3, 1865.

In 1863, he was selected as New Mexico Territory's delegate to the 1864 Republican National Convention. He traveled to Washington, D.C., where the Thirty-Eighth Congress met in its first session on December 7. During the 1864 Republican National Convention, he was among those who favored the renomination of President Lincoln.

He was at Ford's Theatre when Lincoln was shot by John Wilkes Booth in April 1865. In the summer of 1865, Perea was renominated for his seat in Congress, but did not win the election.

=== Later life ===
Perea was elected to the Territorial Council of New Mexico for a third time in 1866, and a fourth time in 1884. In 1881 he had moved from Bernalillo County to Jemez Springs, New Mexico. There he served as proprietor of the springs, believed to be healthful, and a related hotel. After several years, he was appointed as US postmaster of Jemez Springs, serving from 1894 to 1905 during Republican administrations.

He moved to Albuquerque, New Mexico, in 1906 and died there May 21, 1913. He was interred in Fairview Cemetery.

=== Family ===
Perea was married twice. He first married Delores Otero on March 15, 1851. They had a total of eighteen children, most of whom died as infants. Delores died in 1866.

Perea married secondly Gabriela Montoya in 1875. With his second wife he had another eighteen children, ten of whom survived him. Through his daughter Maria Cristina Perea, who married Donaciano Lovato, Francisco Perea is the great-great-great-grandfather of singer/actress Demi Lovato.

== See also ==
- Hispanics in the American Civil War
- List of Hispanic Americans in the United States Congress

U.S. House of Representatives
Preceded by John S. Watts	Delegate to the U.S. House of Representatives from New Mexico; 1863-1865	Succeeded by J. Francisco Chaves
