= Miguel Antonio Otero (born 1829) =

American politician (1829–1882)

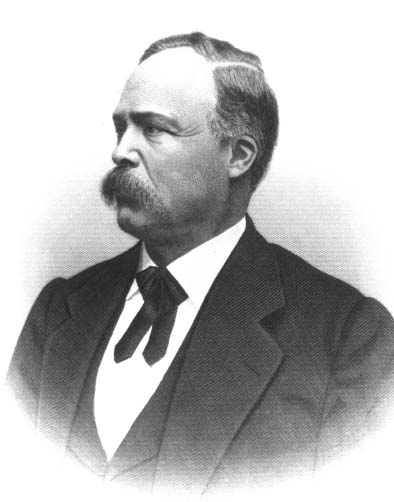

Member of the U.S. House of Representatives from New Mexico Territory's At-large district
- In office July 23, 1856 – March 3, 1861 (Delegate)
- Preceded by: José Manuel Gallegos
- Succeeded by: John S. Watts

Personal details
- Born: Miguel Antonio Otero Aragón; June 21, 1829 Valencia, Santa Fe de Nuevo México, First Mexican Republic (now Valencia County, New Mexico, U.S.)
- Died: May 30, 1882 (aged 52) Las Vegas, New Mexico Territory
- Party: Democratic
- Children: Miguel Antonio Otero
- Education: Pingree College
- Occupation: lawyer, politician, businessman, banker

Miguel Antonio Otero Aragón (June 21, 1829 – May 30, 1882) was an American politician of the New Mexico Territory and instrumental in the economic development of the territory.

== Early life ==
Miguel Antonio Otero was born in Valencia, Nuevo México to Don Vicente Otero and Doña Gertrudis Aragón de Otero of Spain. Don Vicente had held prominent civic positions as judge and mayor in Valencia County, under both Spanish and Mexican Governments.

Otero received his early education in Valencia. In 1841 he enrolled at St. Louis University in the state of Missouri and subsequently graduated from Pingree College in Fishkill, New York, where he taught while he began his study of law. In 1851 he returned to Missouri, where he studied law and was admitted to the bar.

In 1852, he returned to New Mexico and led a herd of sheep, thought to belong to his brother, Antonio José Otero, overland to California. Returning from California, he practiced law for a short time.

He was a public advocate of the Mexican–American War.

== Career as politician ==
In 1852, Otero became the private secretary to the Governor of New Mexico, William C. Lane, and was elected to the second Legislative Assembly of the territory of New Mexico. In 1854, he was appointed as attorney general for the territory, and he served for two years. On July 23, 1856, he was seated as a Democratic Delegate to the U.S. House of Representatives after successfully contesting the election of José Manuel Gallegos. With the support of the Bishop of New Mexico, Jean Baptiste Lamy, Otero was reelected to the next two Congresses, but he was not a candidate for renomination in 1860.

An outspoken Congressman and a strong supporter of the railroad, Otero devoted much of his efforts to the construction of the transcontinental railroad through New Mexico. He introduced the Memorial of the New Mexican Railway Company, in Relation to the Pacific Railroad on May 21, 1860.

After Otero had completed his final term in Congress, President Abraham Lincoln nominated him to be minister to Spain in 1861. Otero declined that office to accept an appointment as secretary of the territory of New Mexico, but the Senate did not confirm him because of his involvement in the 1860 Democratic National Convention in South Carolina and his pro-Confederate tendencies.

During the Confederate invasion of New Mexico, the Confederate Army of the West accessed Otero's stores, which contained hundreds of thousands of dollars of merchandise. These supplies helped allowed the Confederate Army to sack Albuquerque in March 1862. It was a matter of public dispute over whether Otero was forced by the Confederate Army, with allegations that Otero had cooperated willingly.

Otero failed in another reelection bid in 1880. His business endeavors, however, in merchandizing, banking, and farming, were highly successful. In addition, he was a strong supporter of the Atchison, Topeka and Santa Fe Railway., and he became one of the founders and later president of the San Miguel National Bank in Las Vegas, New Mexico. He also engaged in out-of-state endeavors, mostly in Kansas City, Missouri.

He died in 1882 at the age of 52 and was buried in Denver's Riverside Cemetery. His son, also named Miguel Antonio Otero, and his nephew Mariano S. Otero, would continue the family tradition of civic service, his son becoming Governor of New Mexico and his nephew a delegate to Congress.

Both Otero County, New Mexico and Otero County, Colorado are named in his honor.

== See also ==
- List of Hispanic Americans in the United States Congress

U.S. House of Representatives
Preceded by José Manuel Gallegos	Delegate to the U.S. House of Representatives from New Mexico; July 23, 1856 - March 3, 1861	Succeeded by John S. Watts
