= José Guadalupe Gallegos =

New Mexican military officer (1828–1867)

- José Guadalupe Gallegos
- Born: April 13, 1828; San José, Santa Fé Province, Mexican Republic (now San Miguel County, New Mexico, U.S.)
- Died: May 18, 1867 (aged 39); New Mexico Territory
- Burial place: Anton Chico, New Mexico
- Military career
- Allegiance: Union
- Branch: New Mexico Militia; Union Army
- Service years: 1854, 1861–1862
- Rank: Brigadier General (Militia); Colonel (USV)
- Commands: 3rd New Mexico Infantry Regiment
- Conflicts: American Civil War
- Other work: NM Territorial Legislature

José Guadalupe Gallegos (April 13, 1828 – May 18, 1867) was a Hispano New Mexican military leader, county sheriff, rancher and politician. In 1854 he served as brigadier general in the volunteer Mounted Militia of New Mexico (Territory) formed for the purpose of protecting communities against Native American attacks. Prior to the Battle of Glorieta Pass, he was a Union field and staff Colonel in the Civil War, serving as commander of the 3rd New Mexico Volunteer Infantry and as commander of the Hatch's Ranch military post. He represented San Miguel County in four of the six Assemblies of the Territorial Legislature between 1855-1861 and served as House Speaker and as Council President. José was one of the founding members of the Historical Society of New Mexico and was a founding associate in the incorporation of the Montezuma Copper Mining Company of Santa Fé, New Mexico the New Mexican Railway Company and the New Mexico Wool Manufacturing Company.

== Early years ==
Gallegos was born April 13, 1828, in San José (San Miguel County), First Mexican Republic (by the time of his death, the New Mexico Territory of the United States). He was the son of José Fernando de Jesus Gallegos and Maria Juliana Padilla. He was raised in an area known as the San Miguel del Vado Land Grant. The land was originally applied for in 1794 as one of the genízaros community grants being established on frontiers for the purpose of buffering larger towns, such as Santa Fé, against raids. Twenty-five percent of the original applicants were genízaros. Following a period of about 20 years of development to meet the grant requirements, individual parcels of land were allotted by don Pedro Bautista Pino in the name of Governor Fernando Chacón's verbal order of March 12, 1803. This vicinity of the Pecos River valley was a long time meeting place for trade between the Plains and Pueblo tribes, a passage through the Sangre de Cristo Mountains for the Pueblo Indians of the Rio Grande valley to access the plains for buffalo hunting, as well as passage for the later Spanish explorers, frontier traders, buffalo hunters, Indian fighters, the Santa Fe Trail, Civil War armies, and later still for the Atchison, Topeka and Santa Fe Railway portion of a southern route of a transcontinental railroad system. The traditional Mexican buffalo hunters of the area were known as ciboleros. San Miguel del Vado was an early frontier outpost serving to protect larger cities such as Santa Fé from marauding Plains Indians. A customs house and soldiers stationed in the area also served to prevent smuggling and tax evasion related to trade along the Santa Fé Trail. San Miguel del Vado soldiers also served to protect expansion into northeastern New Mexico, and the establishment of later Spanish land grants in that area, such as the Las Vegas Land Grant, due in part to population pressures in San Miguel del Vado. San Miguel del Vado had become the administrative headquarters for the northeastern plains region of New Mexico early. These environmental influences contributed to José's decision to join the military and participate in New Mexico Territorial politics.

Gallegos was married to Josefa Gutierres, at an age four months shy of his 16th birthday, on November 18, 1843, at San Miguel del Bado Church by the Father José Francisco Leyba. Area censuses indicate that they had six children. The 1860 Census for San Miguel County indicates a family of four children at that date: Ladislado, Bernabe, Maria Viviana and Juan de Dios. The 1870 Colonias de San Jose Census indicates two additional children, Silviano and Guadalupe.

== Political career ==
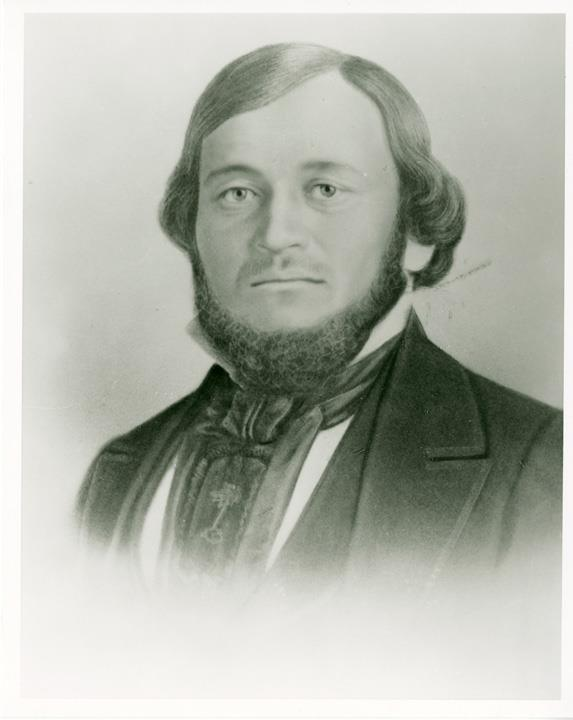
José Guadalupe Gallegos (April 13, 1828 - May 18, 1867) native New Mexican military leader, county sheriff, rancher, politician and a founding member of Historical Society of New Mexico.

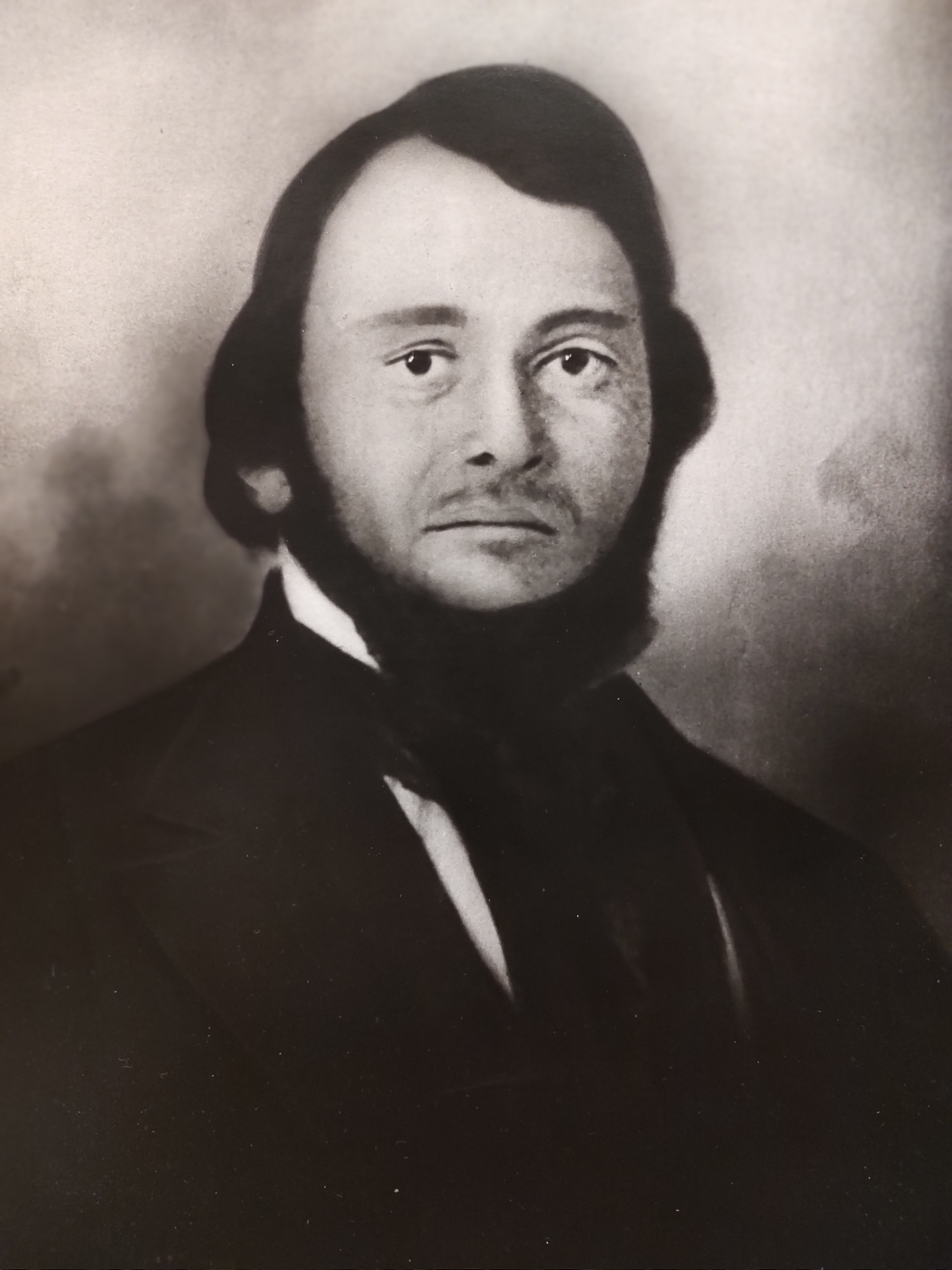
José Guadalupe Gallegos

At age 23, Gallegos was elected and served as sheriff of San Miguel County, New Mexico from September 1851 through September 1853. The Sheriff's office was located in Las Vegas, New Mexico. Eleven years after Jose Guadalupe's death, railway work crews struggled to build the line between La Junta and Raton, and the first Santa Fe train entered New Mexico December 7, 1878. According to Ralph Twitchell, "without exception, in the days of construction of the Santa Fe railway into the Southwest, there was no town which harbored a more disreputable gang of gamblers, desperadoes, and outlaws than did Las Vegas. They controlled, for a while, the local police officers, and the dance halls, and public resorts were the scenes of many shooting affrays and robberies. In the new town, in the immediate vicinity and in front of the present Castenada hotel, were located some of the most disreputable saloons, dance-halls, and resorts ever in frontier days. The gambling houses never closed and the gambling fraternity did about as they pleased. It finally became necessary to organize a committee of one hundred for the safety of the better classes and visitors to the place. Several desperadoes were summarily dealt with, taken from the jail or from their resorts and hung. Notice was served upon every 'undesirable' to leave forthwith and in this manner the town was rid of as desperate a gang of cutthroats and "bad men" as ever congregated in one place in the Southwest." At the time that Gallegos held the sheriff's office, San Miguel County included the present Guadalupe County, which was created from the southern portion of San Miguel County February 26, 1891, by an act of the New Mexico Territorial Legislature.

José Guadalupe ran for the council (Senate) of the 3rd NM Territorial Assembly in 1853, but was not elected. In that race he was on the ticket for the county of Santa Fe, presented by the friends of Governor William Carr Lane, who ran against the Democrat, Padre José Manuel Gallegos, as Territorial delegate to the U.S. Congress, on the same ticket. José Guadalupe was later elected, and served in four of the six Assemblies of the Territorial Legislature between 1855 and 1861. A large majority of the members of council and house were naturally native New Mexicans. About 20 family names include a very large majority of the membership for the whole period, and a few wealthy and influential families in each county controlled the election of representatives and all other matters of the territorial government, with only the slightest interest of the masses. Yet the legislators were as a rule intelligent and patriotic men, rarely accused of corruption and probably superior in respect to representatives of later years. All proceedings were carried out in the Spanish language and also in English translations. Gallegos represented San Miguel County in the 5th (1855-6), 8th (1858-9), 9th (1859–60), and 10th (1860-1) Assemblies. He served as the House speaker in the 8th Assembly and as Council president in the 9th and 10th Assemblies. While in the legislature, he incorporated with like-minded individuals of notoriety, the Historical Society of New Mexico (Dec. 15, 1859), the New Mexican Railway Company (Feb 2, 1860), the Montezuma Copper Mining Company of Santa Fé, New Mexico (Jan. 26, 1861), and the New Mexico Wool Manufacturing Company (Jan. 30, 1861).

== Historical Society of New Mexico ==
The Historical Society of New Mexico was initiated on December 15, 1859. A committee of five was appointed for the purpose of framing a Constitution and By Laws for the intended society. The committee members were Charles P. Clever, United States Marshal in Santa Fe; Facundo Pino, the brother of Nicolas Pino; W.J. Howard; José Guadalupe Gallegos; and Merrill Ashurst, Clever's sometime law partner. They were to report back with their recommendations a week later. On December 22 the report was read and adopted as amended. However, after protracted debates and on several articles, a new committee was appointed to reframe the Constitution. The second committee consisted of Col. John B. Grayson, Major J. L. Donaldson, Hon. K. Benedict, Dr. W. J. Sloan and C. P. Clever Esq. Clever was the only member from the previous committee that was retained.

The new committee submitted its report December 26, 1859, endeavoring to "form an instrument, as plain, simple and comprehensible as possible, and in which every member of the committee concurs. At the same time, it acknowledges its indebtedness to the labors of the previous Committee, several of whose ideas it has adopted. ...Although the subject of the By Laws was not referred to the Committee, it has drawn up a number, to facilitate the organization of the Society which are herewith submitted and unanimously recommended." The report was adopted and the society now had a constitution. It remained for the society to legally incorporate within the state, which it did with the help of Gallegos. The Act to Incorporate the Historical Society of New Mexico was passed February 2, 1860, and signed by José G. Gallegos as Territorial Legislature Council President. In the Fourth Regular Meeting, April 30, 1860 J. G. Gallegos was appointed to Section lst—History, along with on. K. Benedict, Hon. S. M. Baird, Donaciano Vigil, Bishop Lamy, Serafin Ramirez, Charles P. Clever, A. De Marle and Major J. L. Donaldson. Other members were appointed to sections Geography, Indian Races, Geology and Mineralogy, Antiquities and Collections, Natural History, Agriculture, Statistics, Botany, Biography, Meteorology and Climatology. The Society suspended it activities in 1863 due to the Civil War.

== American Civil War ==
Following the outbreak of the Civil War on April 12, 1861, and Lincoln's call for a volunteer army from each state, Governor Henry Connelly issued a bilingual proclamation of August 9, 1861, calling for volunteers as follows. "Citizens of New Mexico, your Territory has been invaded; the integrity of your soil has been attacked, the property of peaceful and industrious citizens has been destroyed or converted to the use of the invaders, and the enemy is already at your doors. You cannot, you must not, hesitate to take up arms in defense of your homes, firesides and families. Your manhood calls upon you to be on the alert and to be vigilant in the protection of the soil of your birth, where repose the sacred remains of your ancestors and which was left by them as a rich heritage to you, if you have the valor to defend it. I feel that I appeal not in vain to those who love the land of their fathers; a land that has been the scene of heroic acts, and deeds of noble daring in wars no more patriotic than that for which preparations are now being made..." Five regiments of volunteers, a regiment of militia, a battalion of militia, and three independent cavalry companies were raised, averaging 97% Hispanics.

On August 26, 1861, Gallegos was commissioned as a staff and field colonel in charge of the Third Regiment (1,000 men), New Mexico Volunteers, in the Army of the United States. He was described by NM Department commander Canby as one among a group of the most efficient volunteer officers. The American Civil War saw a large influx of colonels as the rank was commonly held by those who commanded a regiment. Since most regiments were formations of the separate states and were quickly raised, the colonels in command were known by the title "Colonel of Volunteers," in contrast to Regular Army colonels who held ranks from the "old school" of the professional army before the Civil War.

The Department of New Mexico, which at this time included the Territory of Arizona, had the most officers of Hispanic descent, serving in nineteen units of the Union army. 157 Hispanic officers have been identified, to include Lt. Colonel Diego Archuleta, Colonel Miguel E. Pino, commander the 2nd NMVI, Colonel Jose G. Gallegos, commander of the 3rd NMVI, and Lt. Colonel Francisco Perea, commanding the Perea Militia Battalion. The remaining NMVI commands were: 1st: Colonel Kit Carson; 4th: Colonel Gabriel René Paul; 5th: Colonel Benjamin S. Roberts; and in addition, Graydon's Independent Cavalry Company of NM volunteers was under the command of Captain James Graydon.

Many units of the regular army were transferred from the western states to the East, and 1/3 of all officers in the Union army resigned in order to enlist with the Confederacy. Only four companies of dragoons and the Regiment of Mounted Riflemen would be left to represent the regular army in New Mexico. These were augmented by volunteers who provided much of the manpower for the army in the territory. Colonel Canby concluded, soon after taking command of the Department of New Mexico, that Fort Union be designated the general depot for the distribution of all supplies shipped in via the Santa Fe Trail, except medical provisions, to the several posts and commands in the department. He correctly deduced that the Texas Confederates must attack along one of the rivers, either the Rio Grande, Pecos, or Canadian.

At least one company of dragoons, detached from the garrison at Fort Union, was kept posted at Hatch's Ranch to protect that area and scout south and east for Indians and Texans who might threaten the settlements. The troops at Hatch's Ranch were directed, if threatened by a superior force, to retreat to Fort Union rather than fight. Hatch's Ranch was considered to be a strategic location in the area because it was close to the Pecos River settlements, near the Fort Smith route to Albuquerque, and in an area through which Comanches and Kiowas often entered the settled regions of New Mexico. The ranch became a military outpost in the department in 1856.

Gallegos was made Post Commander at Hatch's Ranch on Nov 22, 1861. In a letter to Colonel William Chapman, commander of Ft. Union, from Colonel Canby via 2nd Lt. A.L. Anderson announcing the governor's appointment of Gallegos as Colonel, José Maria Chaves of Abiquiu as Lt. Colonel, and Manuel Baca of Socorro and Joseph Cumming of Santa Fe as Majors, the Hatch's Ranch assignment was described: "...instructing the Commanding Officer to keep his scouts constantly in the field and to extend their operations to the Canadian and Red River on the East and down the Pecos far enough to give timely warning of the approach of troops from either quarter. Instruct him also to endeavor to establish friendly relations with the Comanches and induce them to bring in information of any movements on the plains." In late 1861 Canby ordered District of the Pecos commander Gallegos to release a party of Kiowas recently captured outside of Hatch's Ranch, have them avert settlements unless authorized by an Indian agent or army officer, and relay any information they could obtain on Texan movements across the plains or along the Canadian and Pecos Rivers. Canby considered the Kiowas as friendly, mistakenly considering that they were a party to the 1861 Treaty of Fort Wise. Union representatives and Confederates both sought information from Native Americans with respect to enemy locations and movements, as well as nonaggression agreements from combative tribes, however Native American intelligence was not critical to the war or necessarily accurate, even though they traveled over vast swaths of land. The unit was also under special order 187, Nov 9, 1861, to construct a road between Las Vegas and Fort Union.

Another source lists Lieutenant Colonel Jose Maria Valdez, Major Faustino B. y Ulibarri and Major Louis M. Vaca as officers under Gallegos' command. The 3rd NM Volunteer Infantry regiment, like the other volunteer organizations of 1861–62, was hastily recruited to assist in repelling the Texas invaders. As originally organized it was composed of fourteen companies, several of them mounted, which were mustered into the U. S. service at Fort Union and Albuquerque, from August 30 to October 10, 1861, for six months. Captain Vigil's company was broken up October 11, 1861; Ortiz', Lovato's and Romero's December 20, 1861, and Mortimore's February 28, 1862, the enlisted men being distributed among the remaining companies. The regiment was mustered out at different dates from March 9 to 20, 1862, by reason of expiration of term of service. Seven companies of the 3rd, under command of Lieutenant-Colonel Valdez, were stationed at Fort Craig, forming part of the force concentrated at that post to oppose the further advance of Sibley's Texan brigade. This portion of the regiment participated in the battle of Valverde, where it was employed chiefly as a reserve force and in supporting McRae's and Hall's batteries. The picked company commanded by Captain Mortimore especially distinguished itself, its commander being three times wounded. The loss of the 3rd in this action was 6 killed, 4 wounded and 1 missing. Its term of service having expired, the regiment was mustered out shortly after this engagement.

Gallegos served a six-month enlistment in the Army of the United States from August 26, 1861, until March 6, 1862. This was just prior to the Battle of Glorieta Pass, fought from March 26 to 28, 1862, the decisive battle of the New Mexico Campaign. Nonprofessional troops, as opposed to regulars or professional army soldiers, were recruited by both sides in the Civil War for a specific purpose, such as Sibley's campaign, and for a set period of time. The Civil War in New Mexico ended in August 1862, when the last of the Confederates were routed by the California Column. Even though his enlistment period was over, by law, officers in the army could resign their commissions by simply submitting a letter of resignation to the department commander, who forwarded it to the secretary of war for approval by the president. As soon as a letter of acceptance was returned, the officer was free from his obligations to the Union Army. Enlisted men, however, enjoyed no such privilege. They enlisted for a specified period of time and could not resign.

== Later years ==
Following the Civil War, at age 34, Gallegos seems to have dropped into relative anonymity during the five years preceding to his death. He was only thirty-nine years old when he was reported as drowned following a mysterious carriage accident on May 18, 1867. Simon Delgado, age 51 died June 20, 1867, from dropsy and his cousin Miguel E. Pino, age 45 also died from stomach cancer within 36 hours of Simon. Community resolutions were published in Santa Fe, saluting the deaths of all three men. Translations from Spanish follow:

"Resolved: That we deeply deplore the loss that our society has suffered from the deaths of Hons. José Guadalupe Gallegos, Simon Delgado and Miguel E. Pino, and that in making this manifesto, our sentiments demonstrate the esteem that we had for our noble countrymen, now deceased, for their brilliant careers in our age, for their lives, principally upon maturing into men, which were such that it is not possible that we pass in silence, without doing full justice to their memories."

Resolved in addition: That we empathize with the grief and sentiments of every person in the families and relationships of our illustrious deceased, and our regards, truly feeling with our purest hearts, the loss as faithful husbands, as tender parents, and as such honorable brothers.

Resolved in addition: That we reverently bow to the dispassion of the supreme being, regulator of the universe, whose designs are incomprehensible to men, and call upon him, to receive into his mansion, the souls of our.... Forever lamentable, fellow citizens.

Curiously, all three were founding associates for the New Mexico Wool Manufacturing Company. José was buried at Anton Chico, New Mexico on May 24, 1867.

== See also ==
- Hispanics in the American Civil War
- Josiah Gregg, Commerce on the Prairies
- San Miguel del Vado Land Grant
