= José Manuel Gallegos =

American politician (1815–1875)

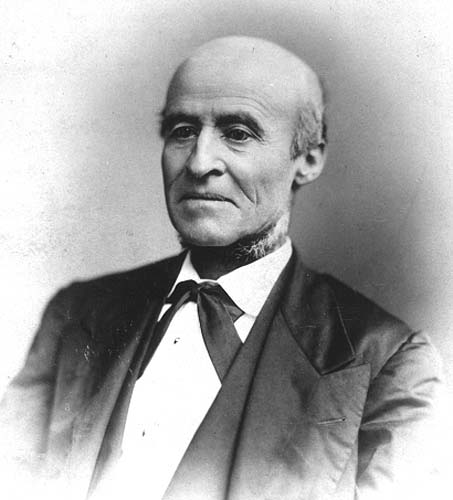

Member of the U.S. House of Representatives from New Mexico Territory's At-large district
- In office March 4, 1853 – July 23, 1856 (Delegate)
- Preceded by: Richard Hanson Weightman
- Succeeded by: Miguel Otero
- In office March 4, 1871 – March 3, 1873 (Delegate)
- Preceded by: José Francisco Chaves
- Succeeded by: Stephen B. Elkins

Personal details
- Born: October 30, 1815 Abiquiú, Santa Fé Province, Viceroyalty of New Spain (now Rio Arriba County, New Mexico, U.S.)
- Died: April 21, 1875 (aged 59) Santa Fe, New Mexico Territory
- Party: Democratic

José Manuel Gallegos (October 30, 1815 – April 21, 1875) was a delegate to the U.S. Congress from the Territory of New Mexico.

== Biography ==
Born in Abiquiú, in what is now Rio Arriba County, New Mexico, Gallegos attended parochial schools. He studied theology at the Jesuit run College of Durango (Colegio de Durango), Republic of Mexico, graduated in 1840, and was ordained a Roman Catholic priest. He served as member of the legislative assembly of what was then the territory of Santa Fe de Nuevo México, Republic of Mexico, from 1843 to 1846. He served as member of the first territorial council of the Territory of New Mexico in 1851.

Gallegos was elected as a Democrat to the Thirty-third U.S. Congress (March 4, 1853 – March 3, 1855). He was elected to a second term but served only briefly, March 4, 1855, to July 23, 1856, as he was succeeded by Miguel Antonio Otero (I), who had successfully contested Gallegos's election. He served as member of the territorial house of representatives 1860-1862 and served as speaker. He was an unsuccessful candidate for election in 1862 to the Thirty-eighth U.S. Congress.

In 1862, Gallegos was made a prisoner of war by the Texas Confederate troops when they came through Santa Fe. He served as Treasurer of the New Mexico Territory in 1865 and 1866, and as Superintendent of Indian Affairs in New Mexico in 1868.

Gallegos was elected as a Democrat to the Forty-second U.S. Congress (March 4, 1871 – March 3, 1873). At the time he did not speak English and asked to be permitted a translator on the Floor of the House of Representatives, this request was denied. He was an unsuccessful candidate for reelection in 1872 to the Forty-third U.S. Congress. He died in Santa Fe, and was interred there in the Catholic Cemetery.

== See also ==
- Santacafé – a Santa Fe restaurant housed in Gallego's historic home
- List of Hispanic Americans in the United States Congress

U.S. House of Representatives
| Preceded by Richard H. Weightman | Delegate to the U.S. House of Representatives from New Mexico; 1853-1856 | Succeeded by Miguel A. Otero |
| Preceded by J. Francisco Chaves | Delegate to the U.S. House of Representatives from New Mexico; 1871-1873 | Succeeded by Stephen B. Elkins |
