= Henry Connelly =

Governor of New Mexico Territory (1833–1904)

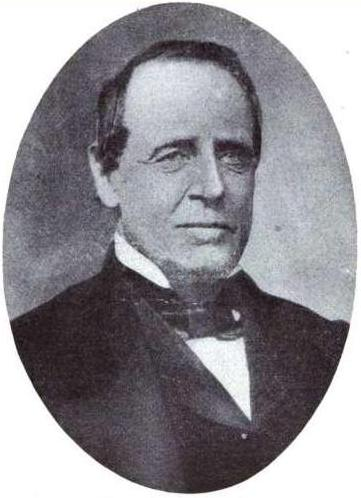
- From 1909's The History of the Military Occupation of the Territory of New Mexico from 1846 to 1851.

4th Civilian Governor of New Mexico Territory
- In office June 1850 – September 1850
- Preceded by: John Munroe
- Succeeded by: John Munroe

5th Governor of New Mexico Territory
- In office September 4, 1861 – July 6, 1866
- Preceded by: Abraham Rencher
- Succeeded by: Robert Byington Mitchell

Personal details
- Born: 1800 Spencer County, Kentucky, US
- Died: August 12, 1866 (aged 65–66)
- Occupation: Physician and merchant
- Known for: Governor of New Mexico

Henry Connelly (1800–August 12, 1866) was the governor of New Mexico Territory during the American Civil War. He was appointed by President Lincoln and served from September 4, 1861, until July 6, 1866. During his term, the territory broke into two, and then three parts due to the Civil War and administrative problems.

== Early years ==
Connelly was born in Spencer County, Kentucky, in 1800. In 1828, he received a medical degree from Transylvania University in Lexington, Kentucky. He practiced medicine and ran a store in Liberty, Missouri, from 1820 until 1824, when he traveled the Santa Fe Trail from Independence, Missouri to Santa Fe, New Mexico with other merchants. During and following these years of travel and trading, he no longer practiced medicine, except in the case of an emergency. In 1828 he moved to Chihuahua, Mexico where he lived until 1848, continuing to make business journeys to Missouri and New Orleans. He married a Mexican woman there in 1838, with whom he had three children. Sometime in the 1840s he moved to Peralta about 17 miles south of the town of Albuquerque, New Mexico. Connelly participated in negotiations in Santa Fe between governor Manuel Armijo and James W. Magoffin (another early trader gaining wealth from Santa Fe trail commerce, and brother-in-law of Susan Shelby Magoffin), preparing the way for Kearny's 1846 bloodless Capture of Santa Fe during the Mexican–American War.

== New Mexico military rule ==
In 1849, after the death of his first wife, Connelly married Dolores Perea. Perea was the widow of Don Mariano Chaves, one of the governors of New Mexico while it was under the rule of Mexico. She was also the mother of Don Mariano's son, José Francisco Chaves, who served three terms in the United States House of Representatives as delegate from the New Mexico Territory, 1865 to 1871.

In 1850 there was a failed attempt in New Mexico to attain statehood. Although there were strongly opposed political factions in New Mexico, most were united in opposing the existing military government, which utilized appointed rather than elected officials. The governor, Col. John Munroe, convened a constitutional assembly in May, which ratified a state constitution by 6,771 votes to 39. The constitution was adopted on 20 June 1850, and state officers were elected. Henry Connelly, who was absent from New Mexico at the time, was elected governor and Manuel Alvarez lieutenant-governor. However, Colonel Munroe forbade the assumption of civil power by the elected officials. The U.S. Senate passed the Compromise of 1850 bill on September 9, including an act to organize New Mexico as a territorial government, thus overriding the authority of the elected state legislature.

== New Mexico Territorial government ==
Henry Connelly served consecutively, as the representative for Bernalillo County, in the New Mexico Territorial Legislature, as a member of 3rd - 8th Assemblies (1853–1859). He was an associate in the incorporation of the New Mexican Railway Company in support for construction of a transcontinental railroad via the southern route through New Mexico in 1860.

The book Doniphan's Expedition and the Conquest of New Mexico and California describes Connelly's presidential appointment as governor.

The Federal Territorial officers and the United States Army officers in the Territory had been appointed by President Buchanan. Under the influences which shaped his administration they were in open sympathy with the Southern Confederacy. They had little doubt of their ability to take the Territory over to the South. At the time of the first inauguration of President Lincoln (1861) two men practically controlled the situation in New Mexico,—Dr. Connelly and M. A. Otero, then Territorial Delegate in Congress. ... President Lincoln appointed Dr. Connelly governor ... The administration of Governor Connelly was satisfactory to the people of New Mexico and to President Lincoln, and he was reappointed in 1864.

Connelly was a main force behind the repeal of the New Mexico Slave Act in 1861. He was New Mexico territorial governor when General Sibley executed the New Mexico Campaign of the American Civil War. During the Battle of Valverde, he was at Fort Craig, then moved the territorial capital from Santa Fe to Las Vegas, New Mexico prior to the Confederate occupation of Santa Fe. Connelly was in ill health during a large part of his administration. He was absent from office due to illness for about a half year between the fall 1862 and the spring of 1863, during which Secretary William F.M. Arny acted as governor. He died of an opium overdose on August 12, 1866, in Santa Fe after leaving office, July 16, 1866.
