= New Mexico Territory =

Territory of the United States of America (1850–1912)

Territory of New Mexico
- Organized incorporated territory of the United States
- 1850–1912
- Flag (1896–1908) Seal (1887–1912)

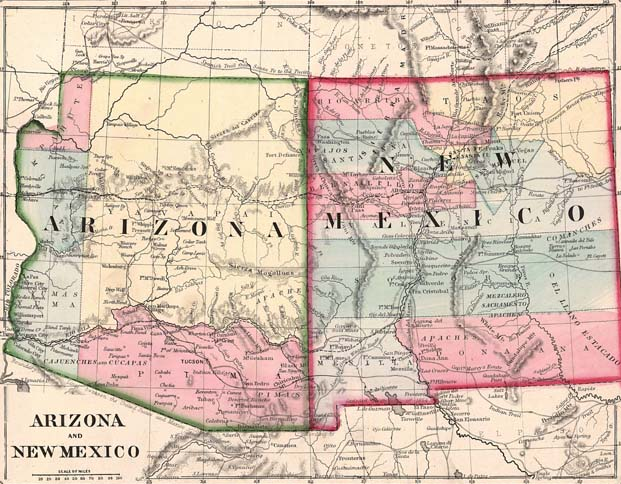
- 1867 map of the Arizona and New Mexico Territories, split from the original New Mexico Territory of 1851, showing then-existing counties
- Capital: Santa Fe
- Government
  - Type: Organized incorporated territory
- Governor
  - 1851–1852: James S. Calhoun
  - 1910–1912: William J. Mills
- Legislature: New Mexico Territorial Legislature
- History
  - Treaty of Guadalupe Hidalgo: May 30, 1848
  - Organic Act (part of Compromise of 1850): September 9, 1850
  - Gadsden Purchase: June 24, 1853
  - Colorado Territory established: February 28, 1861
  - Arizona Territory established: February 24, 1863
  - Statehood: January 6, 1912
Preceded by
U.S. provisional government of New Mexico
Republic of Texas
Succeeded by
New Mexico
Arizona Territory
Colorado Territory
Nevada Territory

The Territory of New Mexico was an organized incorporated territory of the United States from September 9, 1850, until January 6, 1912. It was created from the U.S. provisional government of New Mexico, as a result of Nuevo México becoming part of the American frontier after the Treaty of Guadalupe Hidalgo. It existed with varying boundaries until the territory was admitted to the Union as the U.S. state of New Mexico in 1912. This jurisdiction was an organized, incorporated territory of the US for nearly 62 years, the longest period of any territory in the contiguous United States.

== Before the territory was organized ==
Historical population
Year	Pop.	±%
1850	61,547	—
1860	93,516	+51.9%
1870	91,874	−1.8%
1880	119,565	+30.1%
1890	160,282	+34.1%
1900	195,310	+21.9%
1910	327,301	+67.6%
Source: 1850–1910 (1860 includes both Arizona and New Mexico;

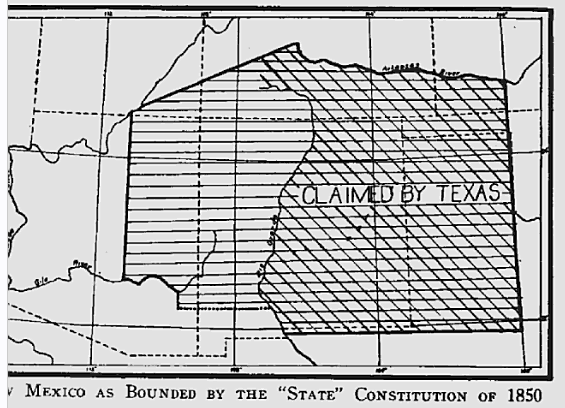
Proposed boundaries for the earlier federal State of New Mexico, 1850

In 1846, during the Mexican–American War, the United States established a provisional government of New Mexico. Territorial boundaries were somewhat ambiguous. After the Mexican Republic formally ceded the region to the United States in 1848, this temporary wartime/military government operated until September 9, 1850.

Earlier in 1850, organizers proposing New Mexico for statehood had drafted a state constitution that prohibited slavery. The request was approved at the same time that the Utah Territory was created to the north. The proposed state boundaries were to extend as far east as the 100th meridian West and as far north as the Arkansas River, thus encompassing the present-day Texas and Oklahoma panhandles and parts of present-day Kansas, Colorado, Utah, and Arizona, as well as most of present-day New Mexico. The state of Texas (admitted to the US in 1845) strongly criticized this plan, as it claimed much of the same territory, although it did not control these lands. In addition, slaveholders worried about not being able to expand slavery to the west of their current slave states.

== Compromise of 1850 and disputes over slavery ==
New Mexico Territory, 1852

The Gadsden Purchase, 1853

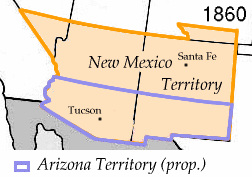

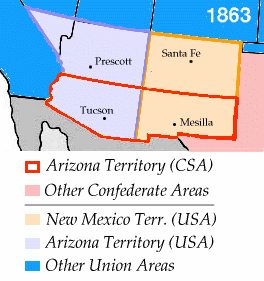

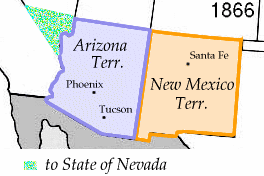

The Compromise of 1850 put an end to the push for immediate New Mexico statehood. Approved by the United States Congress in September 1850, the legislation provided for the establishment of New Mexico Territory and Utah Territory. It also defined the disputed western boundary of Texas.

During the territorial period, the status of slavery provoked considerable debate. Congress was sharply divided on the slavery issue, with Southern representatives determined to protect their options for expansion of slavery in the West. Senator Stephen A. Douglas of Illinois and others maintained that the territory could not restrict slavery, as under the earlier Missouri Compromise. Others, including Abraham Lincoln, insisted that older Mexican Republic legal traditions of the territory, which abolished black slavery in 1834, took precedence and should be continued. (Indian slavery had been abolished in Spanish colonies in 1769.) Regardless of the official status, slavery was rare in antebellum New Mexico. Black slaves never numbered more than about a dozen.

As one of the final attempts at compromise to avoid the Civil War, in December 1860, a U.S. House of Representatives committee proposed to admit New Mexico as a slave state immediately. Although the measure was approved by the committee on December 29, 1860, Southern representatives did not take up this offer. Many had already left Congress due to the imminent declarations of secession by their states.

On February 24, 1863, during the Civil War, Congress passed the "Arizona Organic Act", which split off the western portion of the 12-year-old New Mexico Territory, establishing the new Arizona Territory, where it abolished slavery. As in New Mexico, slavery was already extremely limited, due to earlier Mexican traditions, laws, and patterns of settlement. The northwestern corner of New Mexico Territory was included in Arizona Territory until it was added to the southernmost part of the newly admitted State of Nevada in 1864. Eventually, Arizona Territory was admitted in 1912 as the State of Arizona.

== Territorial evolution ==
The boundaries of the New Mexico Territory at the time of establishment (September 9, 1850) contained most of the present-day State of New Mexico, more than half of the present-day State of Arizona, and portions of the present-day states of Colorado and Nevada. Although this area was smaller than what had been included in the failed statehood proposal of early 1850, the boundary disputes with Texas had been dispelled by the Compromise of 1850.

The Gadsden Purchase was acquired by the United States from Mexico in 1853/1854 (known as the "Venta de La Mesilla" or the "Sale of La Mesilla"), arranged by the then-American ambassador to Mexico, James Gadsden. This added today's southern strip of Arizona and a smaller area in today's southwestern New Mexico to the New Mexico Territory, bringing its land area to the maximum size achieved in its history as an organized territory. The land of 29,640 square miles (76,800 km^{2}) provided a more easily constructed route for a future southern transcontinental railroad line (second of the routes) for the future Southern Pacific Railroad, constructed later in 1881/1883.

The Purchase treaty defined the new border as "up the middle of that river (the Rio Grande) to the point where the parallel of 31° 47' north latitude crosses the same 31°47′0″N 106°31′41.5″W; thence due west one hundred miles; thence south to the parallel of 31° 20' north latitude; thence along the said parallel of 31° 20' to the 111th meridian of longitude west of Greenwich 31°20′N 111°0′W; thence in a straight line to a point on the Colorado River twenty English miles below the junction of the Gila and Colorado rivers; thence up the middle of the said river Colorado until it intersects the present line between the United States and Mexico." The new border included a few miles of the Colorado River at the western end; the remaining land portion consisted of line segments between points, including 32.49399°N 114.813043°W at the Colorado River, west of Nogales at 31.33214°N 111.07423°W, near AZ-NM-Mexico tripoint at 31.332099°N 109.05047°W, the eastern corners of NM southern bootheel (Hidalgo County) at 31.78378°N 108.20854°W, and the west bank of Rio Grande at 31.78377°N 106.52864°W.

The Colorado Territory was established by the "Colorado Organic Act" on February 28, 1861, with the same boundaries that would ultimately constitute the State of Colorado. This Act removed the Colorado lands from the New Mexico Territory.

The creation of the Union Arizona Territory (two years after the ill-fated Confederate Arizona Territory) by the "Arizona Organic Act" on February 24, 1863, removed all the land west of the 109th meridian from the New Mexico Territory, i.e. the entire present-day State of Arizona plus the land that would become the southern part of the State of Nevada in 1864. This Act left the New Mexico Territory with boundaries identical to the eventual State of New Mexico for a half-century until admitted to the Union in 1912 as the 47th state (followed just under six weeks later by the Arizona Territory/State of Arizona, which became the 48th state, finally filling out the coast-to-coast continental expanse of the United States).

In 1850, all 73 churches with regular services in the New Mexico Territory were Catholic. In the 1910 United States census, 26 counties in the New Mexico Territory reported the following population counts (after 7 reported the following counts in the 1850 United States census):

1910 Rank	County	1850 Population	1910 Population
1	Bernalillo	7,751	23,606
2	San Miguel	7,074	22,930
3	Chaves	–	16,850
4	Rio Arriba	10,668	16,624
5	Colfax	–	16,460
6	Quay	–	14,912
7	Grant	–	14,813
8	Santa Fe	7,713	14,770
9	Socorro	–	14,761
10	Valencia	14,189	13,320
11	McKinley	–	12,963
12	Doña Ana	–	12,893
13	Mora	–	12,611
14	Eddy	–	12,400
15	Roosevelt	–	12,064
16	Taos	9,507	12,008
17	Curry	–	11,443
18	Union	–	11,404
19	Guadalupe	–	10,927
20	Torrance	–	10,119
21	Sandoval	–	8,579
22	San Juan	–	8,504
23	Lincoln	–	7,822
24	Otero	–	7,069
25	Luna	–	3,913
26	Sierra	–	3,536
	Santa Ana	4,645	–
	New Mexico Territory	61,547	327,301

== American Civil War ==
As the route to California, New Mexico Territory was disputed territory during the American Civil War. Settlers in the southern part of the Territory willingly joined the Confederate States in 1861 as the newly organized Confederate Territory of Arizona, with a representative delegate to the Confederate Congress in the capital of Richmond. This territory consisted of the southern half of the earlier Federal New Mexico Territory of 1851 and was in contrast to the later Federal Arizona Territory established by the Union in 1863, which was the western half split off from the original U.S. New Mexico Territory. The short-lived Confederate Arizona Territory was the first American territorial entity to be called "Arizona".

The Battle of Glorieta Pass in May 1862, following the retreat of Texan Confederate forces back south to El Paso, placed the area of the Rio Grande valley and eastern New Mexico Territory with the capital of Santa Fe under the control of the Federals with their Union Army. However, the government and leadership of Confederate Arizona persisted until the end of the Civil War in June 1865 with the surrender of the Trans-Mississippi Department, living in exile in El Paso, Texas with its delegate still in Richmond.

== Government ==
The New Mexico Territory was led by a governor who was appointed by the US President and had to be confirmed by the US Senate for a four year term. The territorial governor had the power to: appoint members to the territorial legislature if a vacancy were to happen, appoint members and issue pardons. The Secretary of the New Mexico Territory was also an appointed position and served as the second highest position. The Secretary was also appointed by the US President and approved by the US Senate and served for four years. The Secretary was responsible for transmitting bills to Congress and keeping records. The Secretary could take over as Governor if they were to be ineligible for whatever reason.

The New Mexico Territory had a bicameral legislature consisting of the Council and the House of Representatives. The Council had 12 members from 12 districts while the House had 24 members from 24 districts. Any bill that was passed by the territorial legislature also needed to be approved by US Congress before becoming valid. Any member appointed to an executive position in the territory by the governor had to be approved by the legislature.

=== Territorial symbols ===
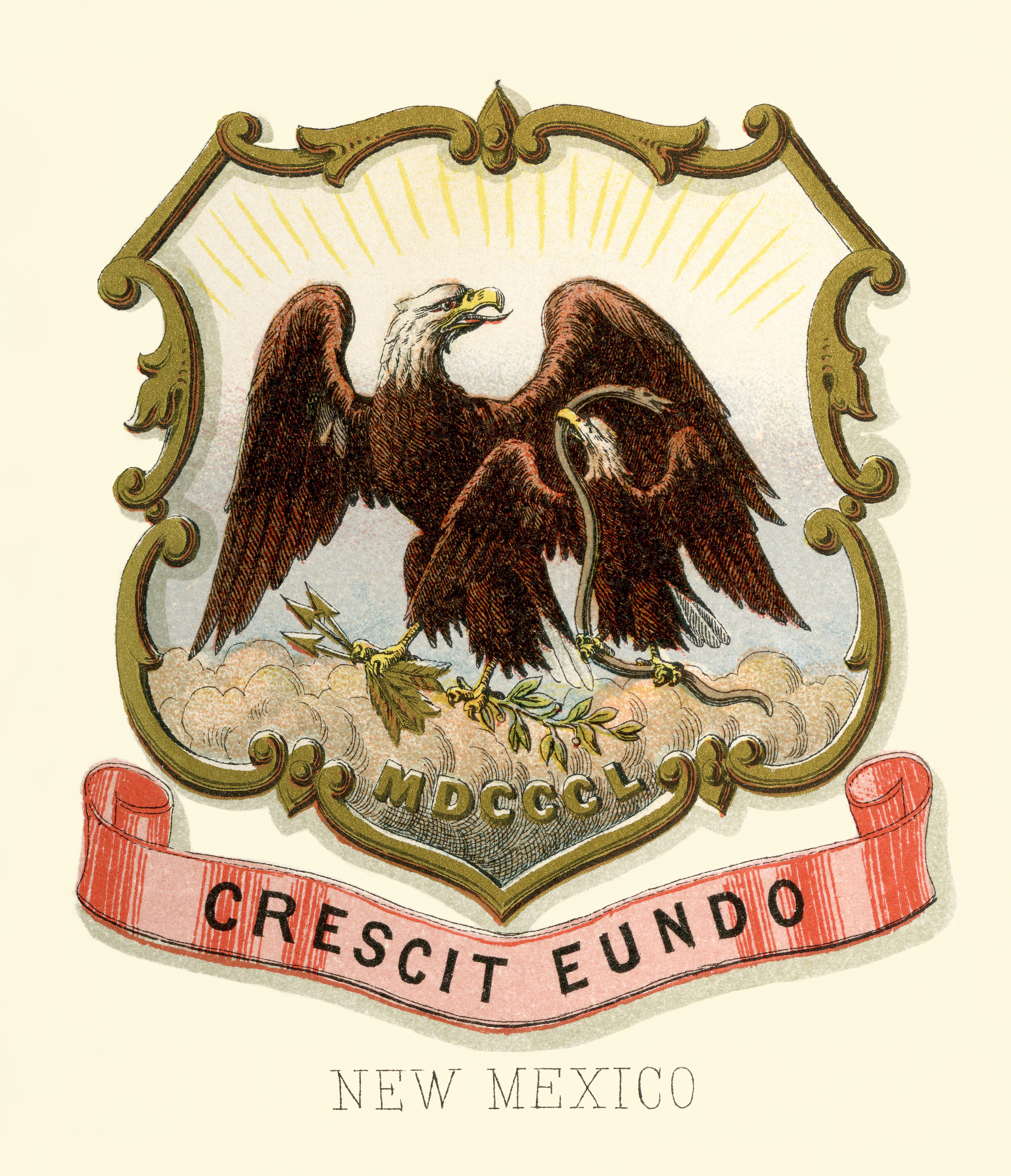
Illustrated coat of arms of the New Mexico Territory, published in State Arms of the Union in 1876

A coat of arms of New Mexico was adopted by the territorial legislature in 1887, formalizing an earlier design, introduced in the early 1860s, already used in the territory's great seal. The legislation, titled "An Act adopting and establishing the coat of arms and great seal of the territory", was approved by Governor Edmund G. Ross on February 1:

The coat of arms of the territory of New Mexico shall be the Mexican Eagle grasping a serpent in its beak, the cactus in its talons, shielded by the American eagle with outspread wings, and grasping arrows in its talons. The date MDCCCL [1850], under the eagles, and above that, on a scroll, the motto: Crescit Eundo. That the great seal of the territory have the coat of arms thereon, being the same seal now used by the secretary of the territory, and that the same be adopted and established as the official seal and coat of arms of the territory of New Mexico.

The "American" bald eagle's outstretched wings over the smaller "Mexican" harpy eagle represents the territory's change of sovereignty. The territorial motto, Crescit eundo (Latin for 'It grows as it goes'), was later added to the seal. The same design was later adapted for use in the seal of the new state of New Mexico in 1913.

== See also ==
- New Mexico Territory in the American Civil War
- Governors of the Territory of New Mexico
- History of New Mexico
- Mexican–American War, 1846–1848
- Silvester Mirabal
- Territorial evolution of the United States
