= Santa Ana County, New Mexico Territory =

Former county in New Mexico Territory, United States

Santa Ana County in New Mexico Territory, 1852.

Santa Ana County was one of the seven original partidos created in New Mexico under Mexican rule. Under U.S. rule, it became a U.S. Territorial county from 1852 until 1876, when it was absorbed by Bernalillo County. It does not exist today as an administrative unit. The original county seat of Santa Ana County is what is now Fort Defiance, Arizona. The county was named after the Pueblo of Santa Ana.

The area enclosed by the original Santa Ana County was in Judicial District No. 1 from 1847 to 1863, then in JD 2 until 1876, when it was absorbed by Bernalillo County.
