= Hispanos of New Mexico =

Ethnic group native to New Mexico

Nuevomexicanos New Mexican Hispanics
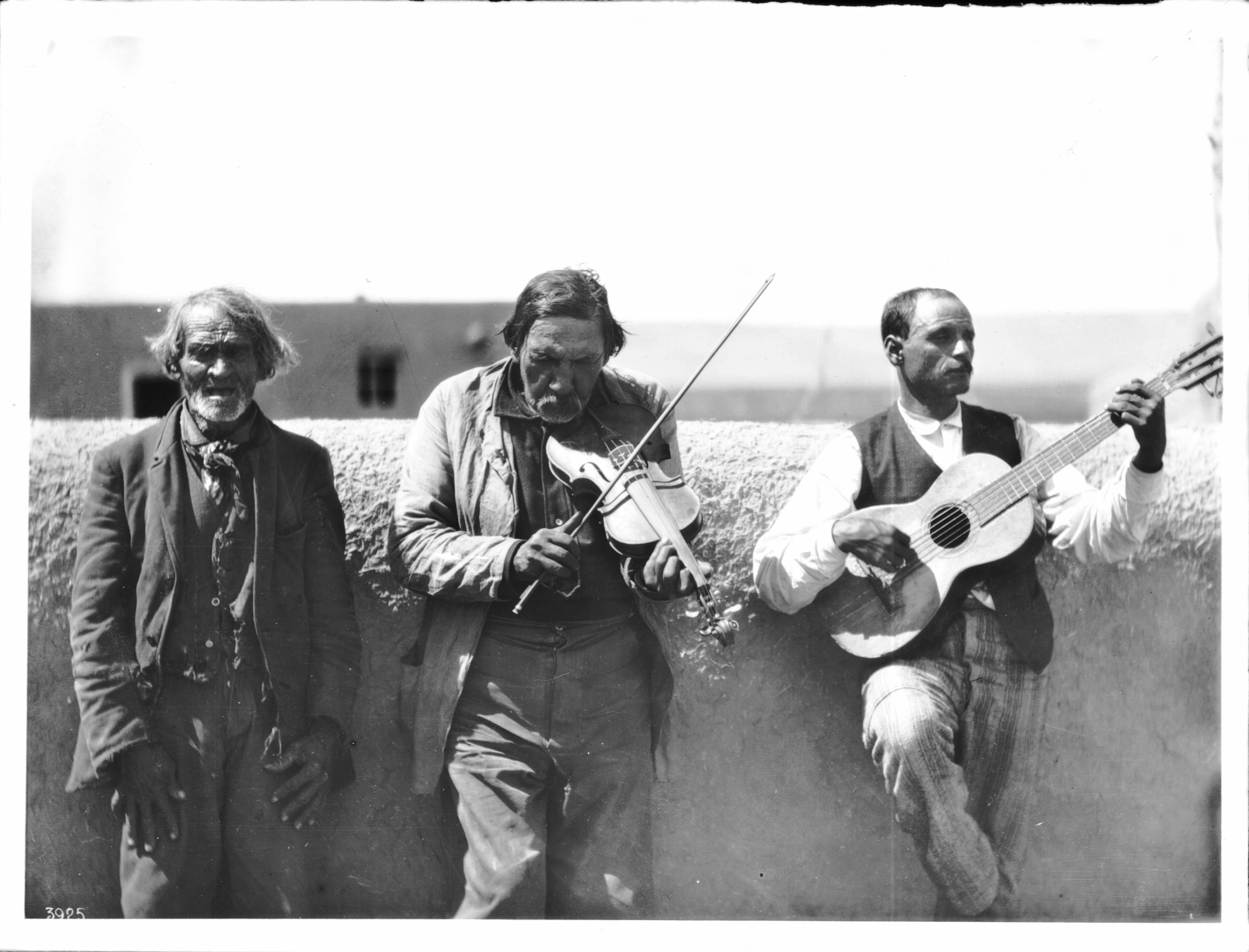
- Hispano musicians at a wedding at San Jose, New Mexico, ca.1898

Total population
- c. 750,000

Regions with significant populations
- United States c. 750,000

Significant New Mexican Hispanos in:
- New Mexico: 338,297 (2010 U.S. census)
- Colorado: 202,011 (2010 U.S. census)
- Arizona: 130,362 (2010 U.S. census)
- Utah: 42,568 (2010 U.S. census)
- Texas: 32,630 (2010 U.S. census)

Languages
- Spanish (NM, US), English (NM, US), Spanglish, Caló

Religion
- Roman Catholicism or Protestantism; Judaism (Crypto-Judaism)

Related ethnic groups
- Other Hispanos of the United States: Californios, Tejanos, Floridanos; Other Hispanic and Latino peoples: Mexican Americans (and Chicanos), Spanish Americans, Mexicans, Spaniards, Indigenous Mexican American, Louisiana Cajuns, Louisiana Criollos, Louisiana Isleños; Native Americans of the Southwestern United States: Puebloans, Navajo, Apache, Comanche, Utes

The Hispanos of New Mexico, also known as New Mexican Hispanics or Nuevomexicanos, are a Hispanic ethnic group originating in the historical region of Santa Fe de Nuevo México, today the US state of New Mexico (Nuevo México), southern Colorado, and other parts of the Southwestern United States including Arizona, Nevada, Texas, and Utah. They are descended from Oasisamerica groups and the settlers of the Viceroyalty of New Spain, the First Mexican Empire and Republic, the Centralist Republic of Mexico, and the New Mexico Territory.

The descendants of these New Mexican settlers make up an ethnic community of approximately 340,000 in New Mexico, with others throughout the historical Spanish territorial claim of Nuevo México. Alongside Californios and Tejanos, they are part of the larger Hispanic community of the United States, who have lived in the American Southwest since the 16th century. These groups are differentiated by time period from the population of Mexican Americans that arrived after the Mexican–American War and later Mexican Revolution. They also differ genetically in their Indigenous heritage, as Mexican Americans tend to be more related to Mesoamerican groups, whereas New Mexicans are more often related the Indigenous peoples of the North American Southwest.

New Mexican Hispanos speak New Mexican English, New Mexican Spanish, or both bilingually. Culturally they identify with the culture of New Mexico and displaying patriotism in regional Americana through pride for cities and towns such as Albuquerque and Santa Fe. Further cultural expression includes New Mexican cuisine and the New Mexico music genre, as well as Ranchero and US Route 66 cruising lifestyles.

== Term ==
In New Mexico, the predominant term for this ethnic group is hispano in Spanish and Hispanic in English, analogous to californio and tejano. In New Mexico, the Spanish-speaking population (of colonial descent) was always proportionally greater than those of California and Texas. The term is commonly used to differentiate those who settled the area early, around 1598 to 1848, from later Mexican migrants. It can also refer to anyone of "Spanish or Indo-Hispanic descent native to the American Southwest." Another term is Nuevomexicano, which is relatively uncommon but still in use. The New Mexican newspaper La Voz del Pueblo (1888-1927) used the terms hispano-americano, nuevomexicano, and neomexicano, the last of which fell entirely out of usage in New Mexican Spanish by the time of Rubén Cobos' A Dictionary of New Mexico and Southern Colorado Spanish and became an exonym used sparingly by a few Anglo scholars outside of New Mexico in the late twentieth century. However, the Diccionario de la lengua española still includes these rarely-used terms neomexicano and neomejicano.

== History ==
For most of its modern history, New Mexico existed on the periphery of the viceroyalty of New Spain (1598—1821) with its capital in Mexico City, and later independent Mexico (1821–1848). However, it was dominated by Comancheria politically and economically from the 1750s to 1850s. Due to the Comanche, contact with the rest of the Spanish empire was limited, and the settlers developed closer trading links with the Comanche than the rest of New Spain. In the meantime, some of the colonists coexisted with and intermarried with Puebloan peoples and Navajos, enemies of the Comanche.

New Mexicans of all ethnicities were commonly enslaved by the Comanche and Apache of Apacheria, while Indigenous New Mexicans were commonly enslaved and adopted Spanish language and culture. These Natives, called Genízaros, served as house servants, sheep herders, and in other capacities in New Mexico including what is known today as Southern Colorado well into the 1800s. By the late 18th century, Genízaros and their descendants, often referred to as Coyotes, comprised nearly one-third of the entire population of New Mexico. After the Mexican–American War, New Mexico and all its inhabitants came under the governance of the English-speaking U.S., and for the next hundred years, English-speakers increased in number. By the 1980s, more and more Hispanos were using English instead of New Mexican Spanish at home.

=== Spanish governance ===
The first Spanish settlers emigrated to New Mexico on July 11, 1598, when the explorer Don Juan de Oñate came north from Mexico City to New Mexico with 500 Spanish settlers and soldiers and a livestock of 7,000 animals. The settlers founded San Juan de los Caballeros, the first Spanish settlement in what was called the Kingdom of New Mexico, after the Valley of Mexico.

Oñate also conquered the territories of the Pueblo peoples. He became the first governor of New Mexico. The exploitation of Spanish rule under Oñate caused nearly continuous attacks and reprisals from the nomadic Amer-Indian tribes on the borders, especially the Apache, Navajo, and Comanche peoples. There were also major clashes between the Franciscan missionaries (brought to New Mexico to convert the Indigenous peoples to Christianity and Hispanicize them) and secular and religious authorities. The colonists exploited Indian labor, as was typical in other areas of the Spanish colonies in the Americas.

In the 1650s, Governor Bernardo López de Mendizábal, and his subordinate Nicolás de Aguilar, enacted a law to force the settlers and Franciscans to pay Native Americans for their work. He opposed what he perceived to be the mistreatment of the Indians by the Franciscans and proposed to allow the Indians to preserve and to practice their culture, religion, and customs. The Franciscans protested the law and accused the governor before the Inquisition. Later he was tried in Mexico City. So, the Franciscans indirectly governed the New Mexico province.

In 1680, the Native American groups that lived along the Rio Grande successfully rose against the Spanish colonizers in what became known as the Pueblo Revolt. When the Spanish returned to the province in 1692, Don Diego de Vargas became the new governor of New Mexico. He entered the former capital bearing an image of La Conquistadora. The Native Americans were so intrigued by the statue of the Virgin Mary that they are reputed to have laid down their arms at the sight of it. This Reconquista of New Mexico is reputed to have been bloodless and every year since then this statue of the Virgin Mary has been carried in procession through the City of Santa Fe to commemorate the event.

At the time of Vargas's arrival, New Mexico was under the jurisdiction of the Royal Audiencia of Guadalajara and belonged to the Viceroyalty of New Spain. However, in 1777 with the creation of the Provincias Internas it was included only in the jurisdiction of the Commandant-General. After the revolt, the Spanish issued substantial land grants to each Pueblo Amerindian and appointed a public defender to protect the rights of the Indians and to argue their legal cases in the Spanish courts.

=== Mexican governance ===
The mainland part of New Spain won independence from Spain in 1821, and New Mexico became part of the new nation of Mexico. The Spanish settlers of New Mexico, and their descendants, adapted somewhat to Mexican citizenship. The Hispanos chose to make New Mexico a territory of Mexico, rather than a state, in order to have more local control over its affairs. In 1836, after the Republic of Texas gained independence, Texas claimed part of the Province of New Mexico, and sought "if possible, to establish Texas jurisdiction over Santa Fe", the capital, which was disputed by Mexico. In 1841, the Texians sent an expedition to occupy the area, but it was captured by Mexican troops.

The Revolt of 1837 in New Mexico caused the Hispanos to overthrow and execute the centrally appointed Mexican governor, demanding increased regional authority. This revolt was defeated by Manuel Armijo, a fellow Hispano appointed by Mexico, which eased the people's concerns. The impetus for this revolt was the class antagonism present in New Mexican society. When central rule was reestablished, Armijo ruled the province as governor, though with greater autonomy. In the mid-1830s, New Mexico began to function as a trading hub between the United States, Central Mexico, and Mexican California.

New Mexico grew economically and the United States began to take notice of the strategic position New Mexico played in the western trade routes. In 1846, during the Mexican–American War, the United States Army occupied the province, which caused the Taos Revolt, a popular insurrection in January 1847 by Hispanos and Pueblo allies against the occupation. In two short campaigns, U.S. troops and militia crushed the rebellion. The rebels regrouped and fought three more engagements, but after being defeated, they abandoned open warfare. Mexico ceded the territories of the north to the United States with the so-called Mexican Cession. As a result, Texas gained control of the City of El Paso, which was formerly in New Mexico. However, in the Compromise of 1850 Texas gave up its claim to the other areas of New Mexico.

=== United States governance ===
After the Mexican–American War, Anglo Americans began migrating in large numbers to all of the newly acquired territory. Anglos began taking lands from both Native Americans and Hispanos by different means, most notably by squatting. Squatters often sold these lands to land speculators for huge profits, especially after the passing of the 1862 Homestead Act. Hispanos demanded that their lands be returned but governments did not respond favorably. For example, the Surveyor of General Claims Office in New Mexico would at times take up to fifty years to process a claim, meanwhile, the lands were being grabbed up by the newcomers. One tactic used to defraud Hispanos from their lands was to demand that they present documentation proving ownership written in English. Because the territory had previously been part of Mexico, only Spanish-language ownership documentation existed. While the Atchison, Topeka & Santa Fe Railway was built in the 1890s, speculators known as the Santa Fe Ring orchestrated schemes to remove Native and Hispano residents from their lands. In response, Hispanos gathered to reclaim lands taken by Anglos. Hoping to scare off the new immigrants, they eventually used intimidation and raids to accomplish their goals. They sought to develop a class-based consciousness among local people through the everyday tactics of resistance to the economic and social order confronting common property land grant communities. They called themselves Las Gorras Blancas a term owing its origin to the white head coverings many wore.

The New Mexico Territory played a role in the Trans-Mississippi Theater of the American Civil War. Both Confederate and Union governments claimed ownership and territorial rights over it. In 1861 the Confederacy claimed the southern tract as its own Arizona Territory and waged the ambitious New Mexico campaign in an attempt to control the American Southwest and to open up access to Union California. Confederate power in the New Mexico Territory was effectively broken in 1862 after the Battle of Glorieta Pass. The New Mexico Volunteer Infantry, with 157 Hispanic officers, was the Union unit with the most officers of that ethnic background. Along with Colonel Miguel E. Pino and Lieutenant Colonel Jose Maria Valdez, who belonged to the 2nd New Mexico Volunteer Infantry, the New Mexico Volunteer Infantry also included Colonel Diego Archuleta (eventually promoted to Brigadier General), the commanding officer of the First New Mexico Volunteer Infantry, Colonel Jose G. Gallegos commander of the Third New Mexico Volunteer Infantry, and Lieutenant Colonel Francisco Perea, who commanded Perea's Militia Battalion.

After the Civil War, Congress passed the Peonage Act of 1867, aiming to abolish the historical system of peonage that had existed among the Hispano population.

After New Mexico's annexation and before statehood, Anglos called New Mexico's Hispanics "Mexicans", with little distinction being made from those who lived south of the border. The loss of land, the encroachment of Anglos and ensuing conflict led to a growth in ethnic identity among New Mexican Hispanos. At the same time, economic growth led to Hispanos' being brought into the American cash economy, whereas previously most rural Hispanos lived at a subsistence level. Many Hispanos ended up moving to other areas as migrant laborers to be able to support their families. With the development of the curio market in the early 20th century, others were able to employ traditional crafts, such as weaving, to supplement their income.

In January 1912, New Mexico became an American state, and Anglophones eventually became the majority population. The state's Hispanos became an economically disadvantaged population, becoming virtual second-class citizens compared to the Anglos. The Hispanos suffered discrimination from Anglophone Americans, who also questioned the loyalty of these new American citizens. The cultures of Hispanos and immigrant Anglophones eventually mixed to some degree, as was the case with immigrants in other parts of the United States.

The United States and the New Mexico State governments tried to incorporate the Hispanos into mainstream American life. Examples of this include: is the mixing of Hispanos' images with American patriots' symbols, the first translation of the national anthem into Spanish, and the recruitment of numerous Hispanos ranchers, horsemen, and farmers to fight for the U.S. in both the Spanish–American War and the First World War. One early contribution by the Hispanos to American society was their support for women's suffrage. Contributions from both sides helped to improve the conditions of citizenship in the community, but social inequality between the Anglos and Hispanos remained.

Anglos and Hispanics cooperated because both prosperous and poor Hispanics could vote and they outnumbered the Anglos. Around 1920, the term "Spanish-American" replaced "Mexican" in polite society and in political debate. The new term served the interests of both groups. For Spanish speakers, it evoked Spain, not Mexico, recalling images of a romantic colonial past and suggesting a future of equality in Anglo-dominated America. For Anglos, on the other hand, it was a useful term that upgraded the state's image, for the old image as a "Mexican" land suggested violence and disorder, and had discouraged capital investment and set back the statehood campaign. The new term gave the impression that Spanish-Americans belonged to a true American political culture, making the established order appear all the more democratic.

World War II was a transformative time for New Mexican Hispanos. Increased federal investment in the state, such as the Manhattan Project and the founding of Los Alamos, provided employment to Hispanos. At the same time, Hispanos joined the military and served abroad at a higher-than-average rate. A large number were victims of the Bataan Death March. As a result, there are many memorials and commemorations of that events' victims in New Mexico.

== Population ==
Hispanos identify strongly with their Hispanic heritage, and are focused on their aforementioned New Mexican identity. Exact numbers for the population size of New Mexican Hispanos is difficult, as many also identify as Mexican Americans (with a small minority identifying with the Chicano movement) or Spanish Americans.

=== New Mexican families ===
The following family names are listed in the New Mexico Office of the State Historian, Origins of New Mexico Families by Fray Angélico Chávez, and Beyond Origins of New Mexico Families by José Antonio Esquibel.

- Abendaño
- Abeyta
- Alderete
- Alire
- Anaya Almazán
- Apodaca
- Aragón
- Archibeque
- Archuleta
- Arellano
- Armijo
- Atencio
- Baca
- Benavides
- Borrego
- Bustamante
- Bustos/Bustillos
- Candelaria
- Casados
- Cedillo Rico de Rojas
- Chávez
- Cisneros
- Córdova
- Domínguez de Mendoza
- Durán
- Durán y Chaves
- Encinias
- Esquibel
- Espinosa
- Gallegos
- Gabaldón
- García
- García Jurado
- Gómez
- González
- Griego
- Guadalajara
- Gurulé
- Gutiérrez
- Herrera
- Jaramillo Negrete
- Jirón de Tejeda
- Jorge de Vera
- Jurdo de Gracia
- Leyva
- Lobato/Lovato
- López
- López de Ocanto
- López del Castillo
- López de Gracia
- López Holguín
- López Sambrano
- Lucero
- Lucero de Godoy
- Luján
- Luna
- Madrid
- Mirabal
- Maese
- Manzanares
- Martinez
- Márquez
- Martín Serrano
- Mares/Marez
- Mascareñas
- Medina
- Mestas
- Montes Vigil
- Miera y Pacheco
- Mirabal
- Molina
- Mondragón
- Moreno de Trujillo
- Montaño
- Montoya
- Moraga
- Moya
- Naranjo
- Nieto
- Olivas
- Ortega
- Ortíz
- Páes Hurtado
- Pacheco
- Padilla
- Paredes
- Pérez de Bustillo
- Peña
- Pino
- Quintana
- Rael de Aguilar
- Rivera
- Robledo
- Rodríguez
- Romero
- Romo de Vera
- Roybal
- Roybal y Torrado
- Sáez/Sáenz
- Sandoval Martínez
- Salas
- Salazar
- Sánchez
- Sánchez de Iñigo
- Santisteban
- Sedillo
- Segura
- Sena
- Serna
- Silva
- Sisneros
- Solano
- Tafoya
- Telles Jirón
- Tapia
- Tenorio
- Torrado
- Torres/Torrez
- Trujillo
- Ulibarrí
- Vásquez de Lara
- Valdes
- Varela
- Vallejos
- Valles
- Vega y Coca
- Velásquez
- Vera
- Vigil
- Vitoria Carvajal
- Villalpando
- Zamorano

== Ancestry ==
=== Native American ancestry ===
According to DNA studies, Hispanos of New Mexico have significant proportions of Native American genes (between 30 and 40% of the Nuevomexicano genome) due to mixing between Spanish and Native Americans that occurred during the colonial era. Much of this ancestry comes from genízaros, enslaved Native Americans serving Hispanic families in the colonial period. Their Amerindian ancestors are mainly Pueblos, Navajos, and Apaches, but may also include Comanches, Utes, and Indigenous Mexicans. Dakota anthropologist Kim Tallbear writes that genetic testing cannot determine tribal origins, and that ancestry cannot determine if someone is Indigenous.

=== Crypto-Judaism ===
According to the Kupersmit Research, in 2015 there were about 24,000 Jews in New Mexico, 1,700 of whom were born in the state. However some have proposed that there may be a significant number of Latinos in New Mexico who are descendants of Anusim, or crypto-Jews.

In Old Town Albuquerque, the San Felipe de Neri Church, built in 1793, contains a Star of David on the left and right sides of the altar. Some observers believe that this is evidence of the influence of Crypto-Jews in New Mexico, but others think there is not enough to support that interpretation. Researchers have found cemetery headstones in Northern New Mexico with Hebrew and Jewish symbols alongside those with Catholic crosses.

Genetic studies have been conducted on some Spanish New Mexicans. Michael Hammer, a research professor at the University of Arizona and an expert on Jewish genetics, said that fewer than 1% of non-Semites, but more than four times the entire Jewish population of the world, possessed the male-specific "Cohanim marker" (this is not carried by all Jews, but is prevalent among Jews claiming descent from hereditary priests). Some 30 of 78 Hispanos tested in New Mexico (38.5%) were found to carry the Cohanim marker according to claims in media reports.

Bennett Greenspan, Family Tree DNA's founder, whose recent ancestors were Ashkenazi Jews in Eastern Europe, also carries a Sephardic Y-chromosomal lineage, belonging to haplogroup J-M267. Greenspan's 67-marker STR matches include two Hispanic descendants of Juan Tenorio of Seville, Spain, one of whom is Manuel Tenorio, a Catholic from a New Mexican Hispano family.

New Mexican Hispanos have been found to share identical by descent DNA segments with Ashkenazi Jews, Syrian Jews, and Moroccan Jews in GEDmatch. However, Hispanos of New Mexico have no more Sephardic Jewish genes than the Hispanic American population.

== Culture ==
=== Weaving ===
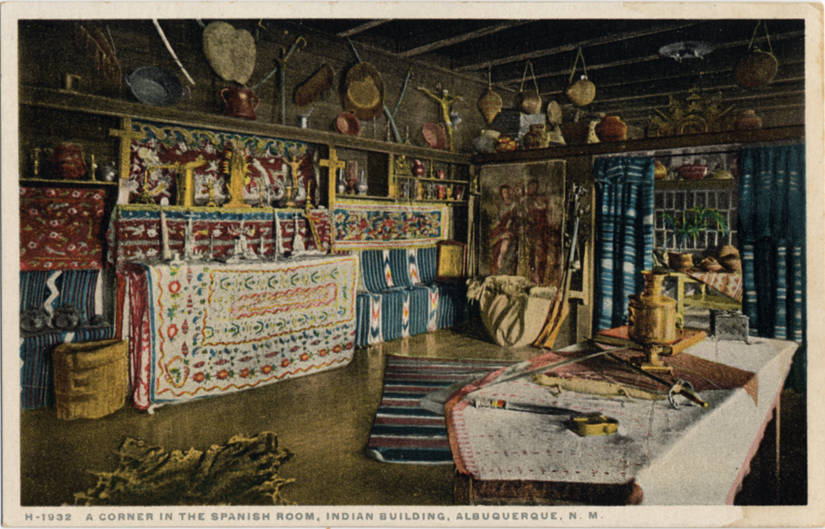
A corner in the Spanish Room, Indian Building, Albuquerque, New Mexico

New Mexico's Hispanos have developed a rich weaving tradition, with roots in the weaving practices of Spain and Mexico and heavy influences from the local weaving traditions of the Navajo and Puebloans. Hispanic weaving's Spanish roots also bear Moorish influence, due to their occupation of Spain, and New Mexican Hispanic weaving also shows influence from trade goods imported from the Far East. Hispanic Weaving has evolved considerably from its establishment, while at the same time Hispanic weavers have always maintained continuity with their forebears practices.

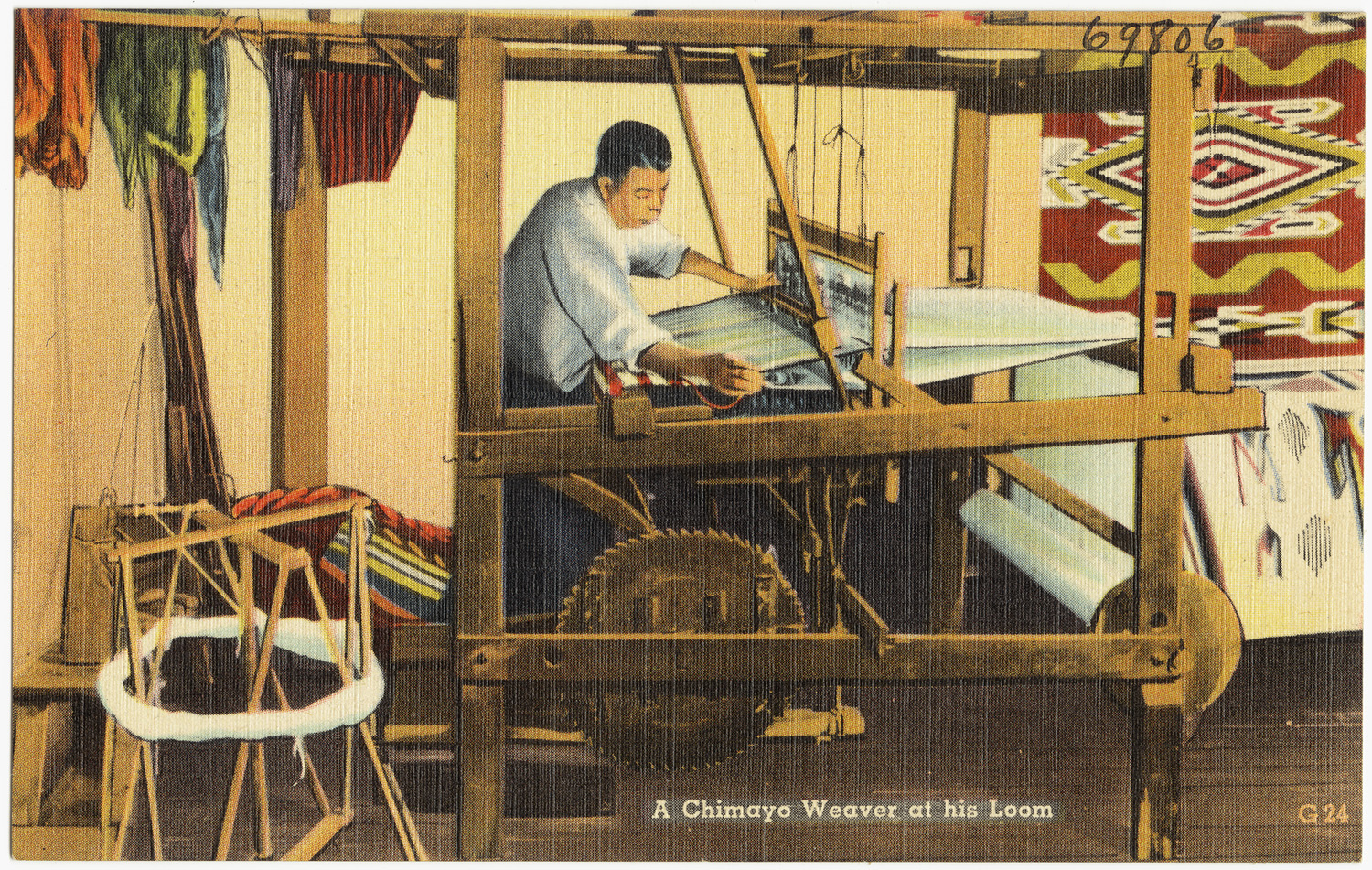
A Chimayó weaver at his loom. One clear difference between New Mexican Hispanic weaving and Navajo weaving is that Hispanic weavers stand upright while weaving.

Mexican influence on New Mexican Hispanic weaving did not stop once Hispanics in New Mexico began developing their own weaving tradition. New Mexican weavers adopted the Saltillo style of serape from Mexico, and Mexican weavers would continue moving into New Mexico and influencing local weaving up through the early 20th century. New Mexican Hispanics also developed their own styles of weaving. The Río Grande style, named after the river, was heavily inspired by the Saltillo style but it also shows many simplifications. The availability of commercial yarns in the late 1800s led to more intricate designs, such as the blankets which came to be known as "Hispanic eyedazzlers". A new type of design from this time, typically featuring eight-pointed stars, became known as Trampas or Vallero, after the villages where it originated. A Chimayó style, named after the town of Chimayó, developed between 1920 and 1940. It is characterized by well-developed transverse bands and a prominent central motif. The central motif is usually diamond or hourglass shaped and very elaborate. The Chimayó style is the most common one today, but other weavers recreate older designs, and some make very individual pieces.

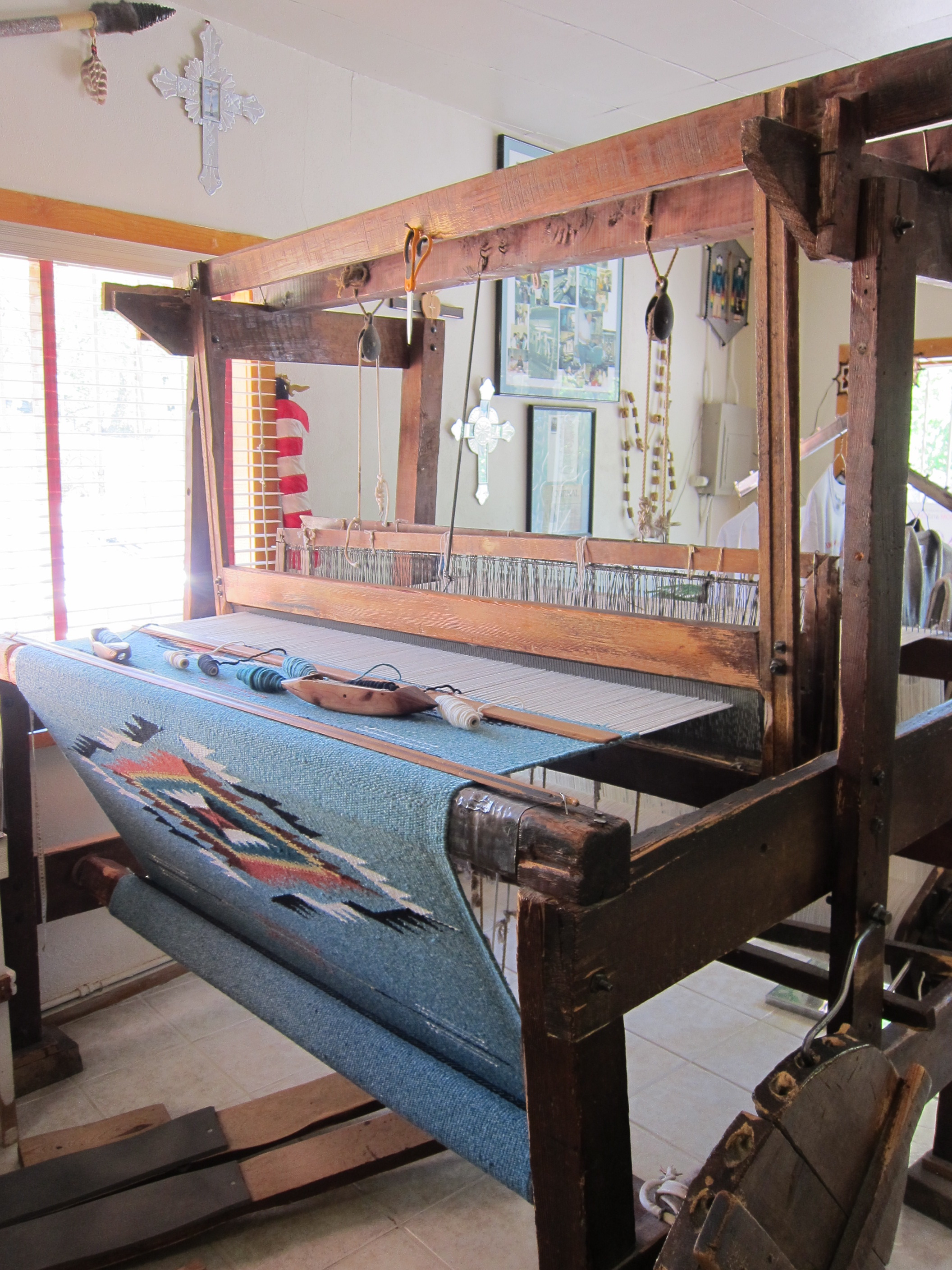
A Chimayó loom in the process of weaving a rug.

While New Mexican Hispanic weaving started out with the production of woven goods for local consumption, even in the colonial era New Mexican Hispanos traded their woven blankets with Native Americans and with residents of Mexico's interior. These blankets formed an important part of trade with local Native Americans. New Mexico's annexation to the United States resulted in the establishment of a curio market, to which Hispanic weavers adjusted their production. This market provided an important opportunity for Hispanics who became middlemen between weavers and customers. During this period, the Anglo-American market was interested in Native American collectables, and as a result weavers incorporated many Amerindian designs into their weavings.

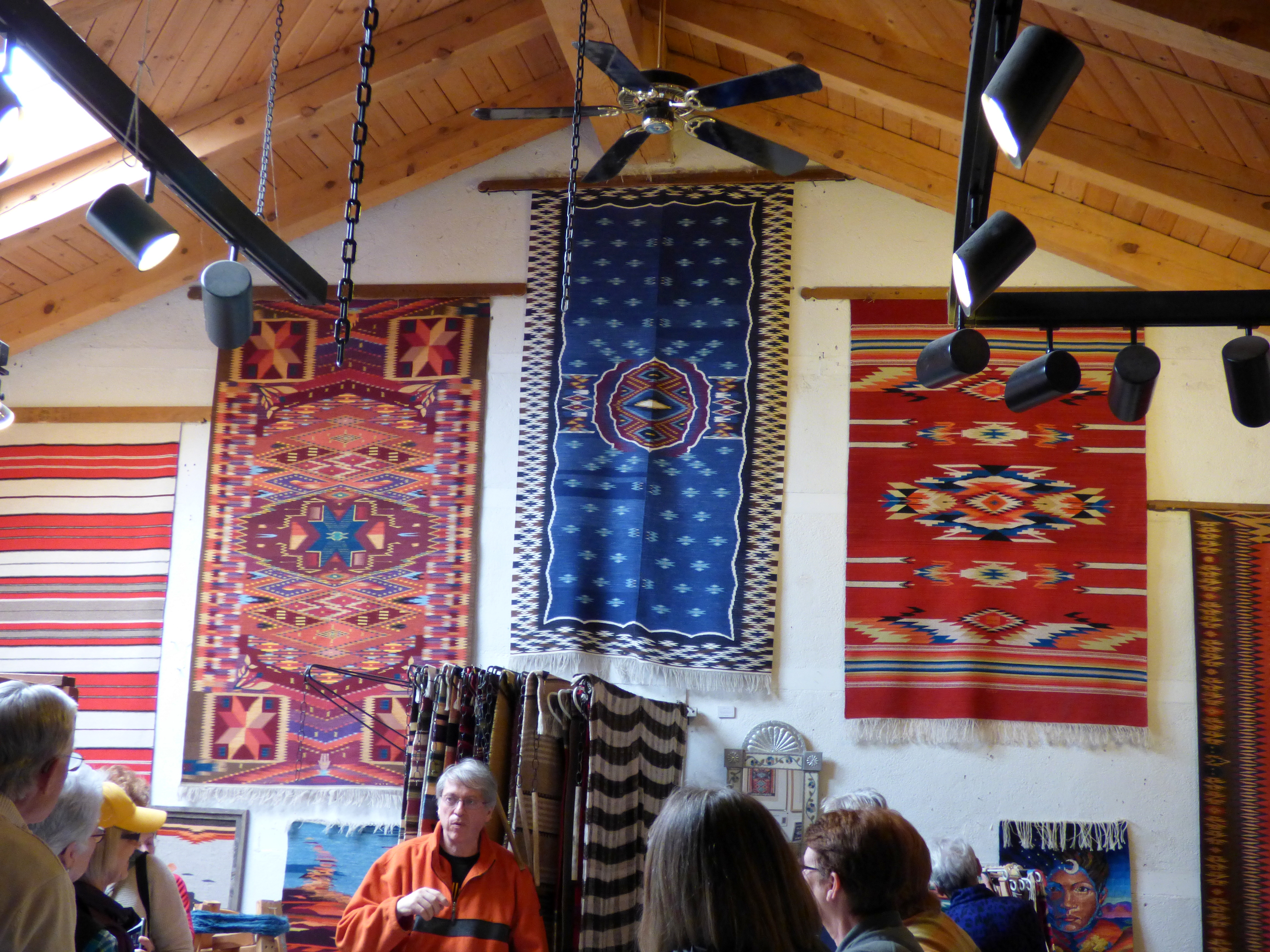
Chimayo rugs for sale (2016)

Later, after the first World War, Anglo-Americans interested in a revival of Spanish arts and crafts in New Mexico began to promote what they saw as authentic Spanish weaving. They rejected Native American and Mexican influences in New Mexican Hispanic weaving and promoted the idea of Hispanic weaving as a "pure" preserved Spanish custom. They rejected the supposed inauthenticity and commerciality of the curio market. In many cases, they ended up attempting to impose their own artistic tastes on Hispanic weavers. Later, with the Great Depression came government programs promoting weaving as a skill.

=== New Mexican Spanish ===
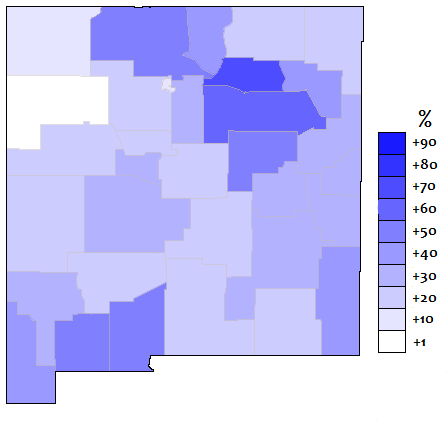
Spanish language in New Mexico by county

Because of the relative isolation of these people from other Spanish-speaking areas over most of the area's 400-year history, they developed what is known as New Mexico Spanish. In particular the Spanish of Hispanos in Northern New Mexico and Southern Colorado has retained many elements of 16th- and 17th-century Spanish spoken by the colonists who settled the area. In addition, some unique vocabulary has developed here. New Mexican Spanish also contains loan words from the Puebloan languages of the upper Rio Grande Valley, Mexican-Spanish words (mexicanismos), and borrowings from English. Grammatical changes include the loss of the second person plural verb form, changes in verb endings, particularly in the preterite, and partial merging of the second and third conjugations.

It is commonly thought that Spanish is an official language alongside English because of its wide usage and legal promotion of Spanish in New Mexico; however, the state has no official language. New Mexico's laws are promulgated bilingually in Spanish and English. Although English is the state government's paper working language, government business is often conducted in Spanish, particularly at the local level. The original state constitution of 1912, renewed in 1931 and 1943, provided for a bilingual government with laws being published in both languages. The constitution does not identify any language as official. While the legislature permitted the use of Spanish there until 1935, in the 21st century all state officials are required to be fluent in English. Some scholars argue that, since not all legal matters are published in both languages, New Mexico cannot be considered a true bilingual state. Juan Perea has countered with saying that the state was officially bilingual until 1953.

With regard to the judiciary, witnesses have the right to testify in either of the two languages. Monolingual speakers of Spanish have the same right and obligation to be considered for jury duty as do speakers of English. In public education, the state has the constitutional obligation to provide for bilingual education and Spanish-speaking instructors in school districts where the majority of students are hispanophone.

In 1995, the state adopted a State Bilingual Song, "New Mexico – Mi Lindo Nuevo México".

=== Politics ===
The political loyalties of Hispanos in New Mexico have shifted over time due to social, economic, and cultural influences. In the late 1800s and early 1900s, many Hispanos supported the Republican Party of New Mexico, which promoted statehood and economic growth. Miguel Antonio Otero, New Mexico's first Hispanic American governor (1897–1906), was a Republican, as was Elfego Baca, a lawman advocating for Hispano rights. By the 1920s, political shifts occurred. Octaviano Ambrosio Larrazolo, the first Hispanic governor after statehood (1928–1929), started as a Republican but later leaned Democratic Party of New Mexico, reflecting the appeal of New Deal policies. Ezequiel Cabeza De Baca, the first Hispanic Democratic governor (1917–1918), marked an earlier shift toward Democrats, driven by economic challenges. Since then, Hispano political allegiance has continued to fluctuate based on economic conditions, social issues, and national politics.

These shifts continue to happen on a national and regional scale. Per exit polls by the Associated Press for the 2020 United States presidential election, much of Joe Biden's strength in New Mexico came from Latino voters, from whom he garnered 61% of the vote. These included 54% of Latinos of Mexican heritage and 65% of Spanish-Americans. In 2024, the 2024 election marked notable Republican gains, especially under the MAGA banner led by Donald Trump. This shift was driven by economic concerns like inflation and jobs, lower Democratic outreach, and an "enthusiasm gap" where Republican turnout rose while Democratic participation dipped slightly. Trump improved his performance in 30 of 33 counties, including Democratic-leaning ones with large Hispanic populations like Bernalillo (Albuquerque) and Doña Ana, and even flipped majority-Hispanic Socorro County for the first time since 1988. Two back-to-back governors also reflected alternating shifts regionally, both Hispanic governors, Republican Susana Martinez and Democrat Michelle Lujan Grisham.

== Notable people ==
- Santiago Abréu (died 8 August 1837) governor of Santa Fe de Nuevo México from 1832 to 1833
- Nicolás de Aguilar (1627–1666?) Spanish official in New Mexico.
- Juan Bautista Vigil y Alarid (1792–1866) Governor of New Mexico in 1846
- Rudolfo Anaya (1937–2020) American author.
- Antonio D. Archuleta, State Senator. In 1883 introduced the bill to create Archuleta County from the western portion of Conejos County.
- Diego Archuleta (1814–1884), Member of the Mexican Congress, soldier in the Mexican Army, in the Mexican–American War, Native American Agent by President Abraham Lincoln, and member the Union Army (US Army) during the American Civil War. He was the first Hispanic Brigadier General.
- Manuel Armijo - (ca. 1793 – 1853), Three times as governor of New Mexico.
- Bartolomé Baca (c. 1767 – 1834), Governor of Santa Fe de Nuevo México
- Polly Baca, American politician who served as Chair of the Democratic Caucus of the Colorado House of Representatives (1976–1979), being the first woman to hold that office and the first Hispanic woman elected to the Colorado State Senate and in the House and Senate of a state Legislature.
- Ezequiel Cabeza De Baca (1864–1917), the first Hispano elected for office as Lieutenant Governor in New Mexico's first election. He is a descendant of the original Spanish settlers which later became part of the Baca family of New Mexico.
- Casimiro Barela (1847–1920), Helped write Colorado's State Constitution.
- José Francisco Chaves (1833–1904), Military leader, politician, lawyer and rancher from the New Mexico Territory.
- Manuel Antonio Chaves (1818?–1889), known as El Leoncito (the little lion), was a soldier in the Mexican Army.
- Angelico Chavez (1910–1996), Friar Minor, priest, historian, author, poet and painter
- Dennis Chávez (1888–1962), Democratic U.S. Senator from the State of New Mexico.
- Linda Chavez, father's family came to New Mexico from Spain in 1601.
- Julián A. Chávez (1808–1879), Rancher, landowner and member of the Los Angeles Common Council (modern City Council) and the Los Angeles County Board of Supervisors.
- Francisco Xavier Chávez (1768-1838), Governor of Mexican New Mexico in 1822.
- Henry Cisneros, American politician and businessman. He served as the mayor of San Antonio, Texas, from 1981 to 1989
- Aurelio Macedonio Espinosa Sr. (1880–1958), Professor who studied the Spanish American folklore and philology. He descended from the first New Mexicans to settle in Colorado in the mid-1800s.
- Aurelio Macedonio Espinosa Jr. (1907–2004), son of Aurelio Macedonio Espinosa Sr. Professor at Stanford University and an expert on Spanish linguistics, focusing on Spanish American folklore.
- José Manuel Gallegos (1828–1867), New Mexican military leader, county sheriff, rancher and politician.
- Dolores Huerta, labor union organizer and civil rights activist
- Demi Lovato, multi-platinum selling recording artist and actress
- Ben Ray Luján, US Senator
- Manuel Lujan, Former US Congressman, Secretary of the Interior
- Michelle Lujan Grisham, current Governor of New Mexico
- Tranquilino Luna (1849–1892), Delegate to the United States House of Representatives from the Territory of New Mexico.
- Patricia Madrid, American politician who served in New Mexico.
- Francisco Antonio Manzanares (1843–1904), American businessman and politician.
- Antonio José Martínez (1793–1867), priest, educator, publisher, rancher, farmer, community leader, and politician
- Juan Domínguez de Mendoza (1631–?), Spanish soldier and member of the Novomexicana elite.
- Bernardo de Miera y Pacheco (1713–1785), cartographer
- Joseph Montoya (1915–1978), Democratic U.S. Senator from New Mexico.
- Miguel Antonio Otero (born 1829), Spanish politician of the New Mexico Territory.
- Miguel Antonio Otero (born 1859), Governor of New Mexico Territory (1897–1906).
- Mariano S. Otero (1844–1904), delegate from the Territory of New Mexico.
- Francisco Perea (1830 – 1913), American businessman and politician, serving first in the House of the New Mexico Territory
- Pedro Perea (1852–1906), Sheep rancher, politician and banker in the Territory of New Mexico.
- Juan Bautista Rael (1900–1993), ethnographer, linguist, and folklorist who was a pioneer in the study of the Hispanos; he studied the peoples, their stories and language, from Northern both New Mexico and Southern Colorado.
- Edward L. Romero, American entrepreneur, activist and former American diplomat. He served as the U.S. Ambassador to Spain and Andorra between the years of 1998 and 2001
- Trinidad Romero (1835–1918), American politician, rancher and Delegate to United States Congress from the Territory of New Mexico.
- Edward R. Roybal (1916–2005), member of the Los Angeles City Council and of the U.S. House of Representatives
- Agueda Salazar Martínez (1898—2000) weaver, head of New Mexico's largest Hispanic weaving family
- John Salazar, former Congressman for Colorado's 3rd congressional district
- Manuel de Sandoval (18th century), prominent military man and the governor of Coahuila (1729–1733 ) and Texas (1734–1736)
- Adelina Otero-Warren (1881–1965), Woman's suffragist, educator, and politician in the United States
- María Dolores Gonzáles (1917–1975), Bilingual educator
- María Dolores Gonzales (1946– ), Bilingual education advocate and educator

== See also ==
- Hispanics and Latinos in New Mexico
- Hispanos (Californios, Genízaros, and Tejanos)
- Cuisine of the Southwestern United States
- Floridanos
- Hispanic
- New Mexico
- Santa Fe de Nuevo México
  - List of Spanish governors of New Mexico
  - List of Mexican governors of New Mexico
- History of New Mexico
- New Mexico music
- New Mexican cuisine
- New Mexican Spanish
- Spaniards in Mexico
- Spanish Americans

== Bibliography ==
- Cobos, Rubén (1983). Dictionary of New Mexico and Southern Colorado Spanish (1st ed.). University of New Mexico Press. ISBN 0-89013-142-2.
- Cobos, Rubén (2003). "Introduction". A Dictionary of New Mexico & Southern Colorado Spanish (2nd ed.). Santa Fe: Museum of New Mexico Press. ISBN 0-89013-452-9.
- Lucero, Helen R.; Baizerman, Suzanne (1999). Chimayó weaving: the transformation of a tradition (1st ed.). Albuquerque: University of New Mexico Press. ISBN 978-0-8263-1976-0. OCLC 955185451.
