= New Mexican Spanish =

Form of Spanish spoken in New Mexico, US

- español neomexicano
- Pronunciation: [espaˈɲol neomexiˈkano]
- Ethnicity: Nuevo Mexicanos
- Language family: Indo-European: Italic; Latino-Faliscan; Romance; Western Romance; Ibero-Romance; West-Iberian; Castilian; Spanish; New Mexican Spanish
- Early forms: Old Latin: Vulgar Latin; Old Spanish; Early Modern Spanish
- Writing system: Latin (Spanish alphabet)

Language codes
- ISO 639-3: –
- Glottolog: newm1235 New Mexican Spanish
- IETF: es-u-sd-usnm
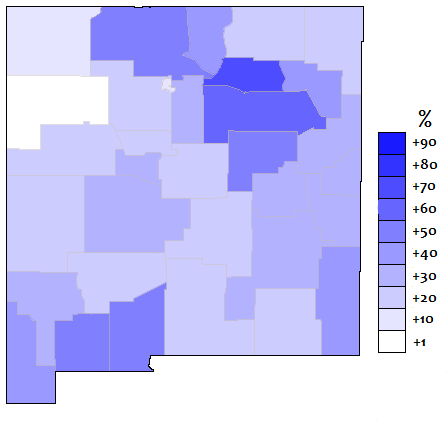
- Spanish language distribution in New Mexico by county

New Mexican Spanish (Spanish: español neomexicano), or New Mexican and Southern Colorado Spanish refers to certain traditional varieties of Spanish spoken in the United States in New Mexico and southern Colorado, which are different from the Spanish spoken by recent immigrants. It includes a traditional indigenous dialect spoken generally by Oasisamerican peoples and Hispano—descendants, who live mostly in New Mexico, southern Colorado, in Pueblos, Jicarilla, Mescalero, the Navajo Nation, and in other parts of the former regions of Nuevo Mexico and the New Mexico Territory.

Due to New Mexico's unique political history and over 400 years of relative geographic isolation, New Mexican Spanish is unique within Hispanic America, with the closest similarities found only in certain rural areas of northern Mexico and Texas; it has been described as unlike any form of Spanish in the world. This dialect is sometimes called Traditional New Mexican Spanish, or the Spanish Dialect of the Upper Rio Grande Region, to distinguish it from the relatively more recent Mexican variety spoken in the south of the state and among more recent Spanish-speaking immigrants.

Among the distinctive features of New Mexican Spanish are the preservation of archaic forms and vocabulary from colonial-era Spanish (such as haiga instead of haya or Yo seigo, instead of Yo soy); the borrowing of words from Puebloan languages, in addition to the Nahuatl loanwords brought by some colonists (such as chimayó, or "obsidian flake", from Tewa and cíbolo, or buffalo, from Zuni); independent lexical and morphological innovations; and a large proportion of English loanwords, particularly for technology (such as bos, troca, and telefón).

Despite surviving centuries of political and social change, including campaigns of suppression in the early 20th century, Traditional New Mexican Spanish is, as of the early 2020s, threatened with extinction over the next few decades; causes include rural flight from the isolated communities that preserved it, the growing influence of Mexican Spanish, and intermarriage and interaction between Hispanos and Mexican immigrants. The traditional dialect has increasingly mixed with contemporary varieties, resulting in a new dialect sometimes called Renovador. Today, the language can be heard in a popular folk genre called New Mexico music and preserved in the traditions of New Mexican cuisine.

== History ==
The Spanish language first arrived in present-day New Mexico with Juan de Oñate's colonization expedition in 1598, which brought 600-700 settlers. Almost half the early settlers were from Spain, including many from New Spain, with most of the rest from various parts of Latin America, the Canary Islands, and Portugal. Following the Pueblo Revolt in 1680, New Mexico was resettled again starting in 1692, primarily by refugees from the Pueblo Revolt and others born in northern New Spain. The Spanish-speaking areas with which New Mexico had the greatest contact were Chihuahua and Sonora.

Likely as a result of these historical origins and connections, Traditional New Mexican Spanish shares many morphological features with the rural Spanish of Chihuahua, Sonora, Durango, and other parts of Mexico. Colonial New Mexico was very isolated and had widespread illiteracy, resulting in most New Mexicans of the time having little to no exposure to "standard" Spanish. This linguistic isolation facilitated New Mexican Spanish's preservation of older vocabulary as well as its own innovations.

During that time, contact with the rest of Spanish America was limited because of the Comancheria, and New Mexican Spanish developed closer trading links to the Comanche than to the rest of New Spain. In the meantime, some Spanish colonists co-existed with and intermarried with Puebloan peoples and Navajos, also enemies of the Comanche.

Like most languages, New Mexican Spanish gradually evolved. As a result the Traditional New Mexican Spanish of the 20th and 21st centuries is not identical to the Spanish of the early colonial period. Many of the changes that occurred in older New Mexican Spanish are reflected in writing. For example, New Mexican Spanish speakers born before the Pueblo Revolt were generally not yeístas; that is, they pronounced the ⟨ll⟩ and ⟨y⟩ sounds differently. After the Pueblo Revolt, New Mexico was re-settled with many new settlers coming in from central Mexico, in addition to returning New Mexican colonists. These new settlers generally did merge the two sounds, and dialect leveling resulted in later generations of New Mexicans consistently merging /ʎ/ and /ʝ/. Colonial New Mexican Spanish also adopted some changes which occurred in the rest of the Spanish speaking world, like the elimination of the future subjunctive tense and the second-person forms of address vuestra merced and vuestra señoría; while the standard subjunctive form haya and the nonstandard form haiga of the auxiliary verb haber have always coexisted in New Mexican Spanish, the prevalence of the nonstandard haiga increased significantly over the colonial period.

Before the middle of the 18th century, there is little evidence of the deletion and occasional epenthesis of ⟨y⟩ and ⟨ll⟩ in contact with front vowels, although that is a characteristic of modern New Mexican and northern Mexican Spanish. The presence of such deletion in areas close and historically connected to New Mexico makes it unlikely that New Mexicans independently developed this feature. Although colonial New Mexico had a very low rate of internal migration, trade connections with Chihuahua were strengthening during this time. Many of the people who moved into New Mexico were traders from Chihuahua, who became socially very prominent. They likely introduced the weakening of ⟨y⟩ and ⟨ll⟩ to New Mexico, where it was adapted by the rest of the community.

New Mexico's 1848 annexation by the U.S. led to a greater exposure to English. Nevertheless, the late-19th-century saw the development of print media, which allowed New Mexican Spanish to resist assimilation toward American English for many decades. The 1911 Encyclopædia Britannica, for instance, noted, "About one-tenth of the Spanish-American and Indian population [of New Mexico] habitually use the English language."

After 1917, Spanish usage in the public sphere began to decline and it was banned in schools, with students often being punished for speaking the language. This punishment was occasionally physical. Newspapers published in Spanish switched to English or went out of business. From then on, Spanish became a language of home and community. The advance of English-language broadcast media accelerated the decline. Since then, New Mexican Spanish has been undergoing a language shift, with Hispanos gradually shifting towards English. In addition, New Mexican Spanish faces pressure from Standard and Mexican Spanish. Younger generations tend to use more Anglicisms and Mexican and standard Spanish forms. The words most characteristic of Traditional New Mexican Spanish, with few exceptions, are less likely to be found in the speech of young people. This is in part due to language attrition. The decline in Spanish exposure in the home creates a vacuum, into which "English and Mexican Spanish flow easily."

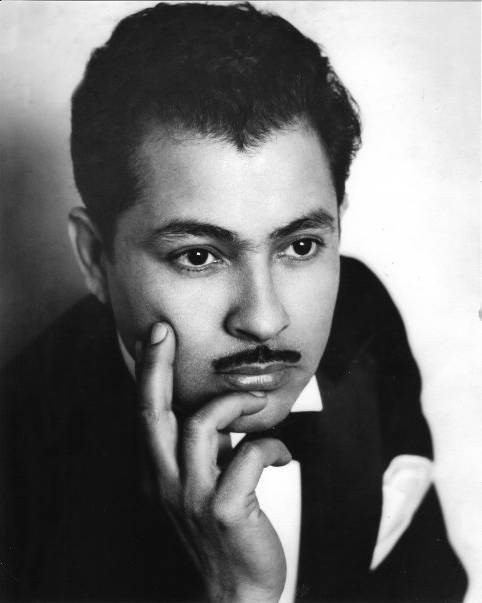
New Mexican linguist and folklorist Rubén Cobos published the first dictionary of New Mexican Spanish, A Dictionary of New Mexico and Southern Colorado Spanish.

In 1983 New Mexican linguist and folklorist Rubén Cobos published the first dictionary of New Mexican Spanish, A Dictionary of New Mexico and Southern Colorado Spanish. Cobos wrote in the introduction that

A dialect of Spanish has been spoken uninterruptedly since the end of the seventeenth century in New Mexico, and since the middle of the nineteenth century in southern Colorado. … Since the early 1940s, with the help of my students at the University of New Mexico and the cooperation of villagers in their sixties, seventies and eighties, I have recorded a large body of New Mexico and southern Colorado Indo-Hispanic folklore materials on magnetic tape. Included in this collection are hundreds of personal interviews and countless examples of corridos and inditas (local ballads), children's games and songs, folktales, chistes (anecdotes), jokes, home remedies, recipes, narratives dealing with local events, proverbs, riddles, songs, versos (rhymed quatrains), and witch stories and accounts of witchcraft. These materials gave me the majority of terms. ...

THE SPANISH SPOKEN in rural areas of New Mexico and southern Colorado can be described as a regional type of language made up of archaic (sixteenth- and seventeenth-century) Spanish; Mexican Indian words, mostly from the Náhuatl; a few indigenous Rio Grande Indian words; words and idiomatic expressions peculiar to the Spanish of Mexico (the so-called mexicanismos); local New Mexico and southern Colorado vocabulary; and countless language items from English which the Spanish-speaking segment of the population has borrowed and adapted for everyday use. New Mexico and southern Colorado Spanish, quite uniform over the whole geographical area, has survived by word of mouth for over four hundred years in a land that until very recent times was almost completely isolated from other Spanish-speaking centers. … offshoot of the Spanish of northern Mexico, especially with respect to usage and pronunciation. ...
in the 1980s, the dialect is losing its struggle for existence because English is the official language of the area (notwithstanding state constitutional articles or amendments to the contrary–especially in New Mexico). The Hispano population in the region lives in an Anglo-oriented environment where all facets of daily living (commerce, education, entertainment, local and national news communications, politics, etc.) use English for their expression. ...

Most young Hispano parents in their twenties and thirties are no longer speaking Spanish to their children. If these young people know Spanish themselves, they find it very difficult and inconvenient to transmit it to their offspring.

Cobos released a second edition of A Dictionary of New Mexico and Southern Colorado Spanish in 2003. New Mexican Spanish of northern New Mexico, including Albuquerque, is being heavily influenced by Mexican Spanish, incorporating numerous Mexicanisms, while at the same time retaining some archaisms characteristic of traditional New Mexican Spanish. The use of Mexicanisms is most prominent in Albuquerque and Santa Fe, compared to other areas in the north. Some older Spanish speakers have noted Mexican immigrants showing surprise at non-immigrants speaking Spanish. In Albuquerque, the use of Mexicanisms correlates only with age, with younger speakers, regardless of their parents' background, being more likely to use Mexicanisms.

Today many native speakers of New Mexican Spanish use the language largely as a sacred language, with many traditional devotions and prayers being in Spanish, and many native speakers are actively using the language with their children. During the 1900s there were many television programs in New Mexican Spanish such as the Val De La O Show as well as New Mexican musicians such as Al Hurricane, but now there are fears it could become an endangered dialect of Spanish. Influence from Mexican immigrants is changing the dialect to become more similar to standard Mexican Spanish

== Geographic distribution ==
New Mexican Spanish refers to the Spanish varieties spoken throughout the state of New Mexico and in the southern portion of Colorado; the label is applied to southern Colorado due to it having historically been part of New Mexico until statehood in 1876, and because most Spanish-speaking Coloradoans in the area trace their ancestry to Spanish-speaking New Mexican settlers.

=== Dialects ===
There are two main Spanish dialects in New Mexico and southern Colorado. One is what Bills and Vigil call Traditional New Mexican Spanish (abbreviated TNMS), spoken in the northern and central parts of the region, whose speakers generally represent early colonial settlement. TNMS has been the subject of extensive study. Despite TNMS' distinctiveness, it does fit into a Mexican "macro-dialect" due to its historical origins and features, and has been called "an offshoot of the Spanish of northern Mexico". The other has been called Border Spanish, found in the southern third of New Mexico plus the Grants area in northwestern New Mexico and Crowley and Otero County, Colorado along the Arkansas River in southeastern Colorado. Although it is primarily the result of 20th-century Mexican immigration and its speakers typically have closer contact with Mexican Spanish, some Border Spanish speakers have ancestry in the region dating back hundreds of years.

Both of these varieties contain various sub-dialects, although the Traditional area has greater variation between different communities, and it also has high idiolectal variation within the same community. This variation is a consequence of both historical isolation and the modern language shift towards English.

The biggest dialect division within Traditional New Mexican Spanish, identified by Bills and Vigil on the basis of lexicon, is between the Río Arriba or upper river dialect and the rest of TNMS. This corresponds to the colonial separation between the Río Arriba and the Río Abajo, or lower river. The dialect boundary is an approximately east-west line running through Santa Fe. The Río Arriba dialect includes a North Central dialect in the middle portion of its dialect area and a Northeastern dialect in its eastern portion. There is also evidence, albeit less clear-cut, of a distinct West Central dialect centered around an area to the southwest of Albuquerque.

There also exists regional phonological variation within TNMS. For example, syllable-initial /s/-aspiration, while occurring throughout New Mexico and Southern Colorado, is particularly notable along the upper Rio Grande between Albuquerque and Taos.

Although the Spanish of Albuquerque has traditionally been considered part of the Traditional area, the high presence of Mexicanisms in Albuquerque Spanish has led some to consider it to constitute a third dialect zone, between Traditional and Border Spanish. In fact, the use of Mexicanisms is widespread across the Traditional Spanish zone, especially in Albuquerque and Santa Fe and among the younger generations.

Some diversity in Border Spanish is to be expected, given the continuous Hispanic presence in southern New Mexico since the colonial period, and the movement of some Traditional Spanish speakers to south of Las Cruces after the Mexican-American War. One sub-dialect of Border Spanish, identified by Bills and Vigil based on lexical criteria, can be found in the southwestern corner of the state, including Doña Ana County and the areas to its west. This is the region closest to the border with Mexico. The southwestern sub-dialect is characterized by a number of word choices, all but one of which are typical of Mexican Spanish usage. For example, while most of New Mexico uses the term bolsa for 'purse' and the Río Arriba area north of Santa Fe uses maleta, the southwestern corner of New Mexico uses the standard cartera. Also, southwestern New Mexico tends to use la craca for 'cracker', while the rest of New Mexico tends to use el craque. Forms with galleta 'cookie', such as galleta de sal 'salt cookie', are found throughout New Mexico.

== Grammar ==
Comparison of New Mexican and Southern Colorado Spanish with Standard Spanish
New Mexico & S. Colorado Spanish	Standard Spanish
Past participle of -ar verbs is -ao/-ada	Past participle of -ar verbs is -ado/-ada
Haber: ha, has, ha, hamos, han + past participle Present subjunctive: haiga + past participle ex: Yo ha oido. (I have heard.); Yo dudo que haiga agua allí. (I doubt there is water there.)	Haber: he, has, ha, hemos, han + past participle Present subjunctive: haya + past participle ex: Yo he oído. Yo dudo que haya agua allí.
2nd person preterite: -astes, -istes or -ates, ites hablates (hablastes), comites (comistes), vivites (vivistes)	2nd person preterite: -aste, -iste ex: hablaste, comiste, viviste
Nosotros ending -emos for present and -imos for past -er/-ir ex: Todos los días venemos. (We come every day.); Ayer no venimos. (We did not come yesterday.)	Nosotros ending -emos/-imos for -er/-ir Standard ex: morimos, sentimos, salimos NM-CO ex: muremos, sintemos, salemos
First person plural forms: -nos endings Pres. subj.: háblenos, bébanos, vívanos Note the accent shift ex: Papá no quiere que bébanos. (Dad doesn't want us to drink.); Imperfect indicative: hablábanos, bebíanos, vivíanos	First person plural forms: Pres. subj.: hablemos, bebamos, vivamos ex: Papá no quiere que bebamos. Imp. indic.: hablábamos, bebíamos, vivíamos

The Spanish spoken in New Mexico and Southern Colorado has a complex relationship with the norma culta or educated norm of standard Spanish grammar. New Mexican Spanish speakers are generally aware of and express preference for standard Mexican Spanish norms, although they often break these norms in daily conversation, and prefer salemos and pidimos to the standard salimos 'we leave' and pedimos 'we request'. That said, New Mexican Spanish, especially the Traditional variety, is known for a large number of nonstandard forms. Use of such forms is not universal, usually correlates negatively with education, and the most characteristic traits of Traditional New Mexican Spanish are generally more common among older speakers.

The following is a list of some characteristics of Traditional New Mexican Spanish's morphology, many of which are also found in Border Spanish:

- The second person preterite endings can be -astes, -istes or -ates, -ites instead of the standard -aste, -iste. The -astes, -istes forms are found throughout the Spanish-speaking world, while the -ates, -ites forms are much more rare.
- Use of alternate strong preterite forms such as:
  - Widespread use of the older vide, vido for standard vi, vio. This usage shows little regional patterning, being found in both Border Spanish and Traditional New Mexican Spanish. Instead, these nonstandard forms correlate negatively with exposure to standard Spanish and are less used by younger people.
  - Widespread use of the regularized -jieron ending instead of -jeron, as in trajieron for trajeron, 'they brought'. This also shows little regional patterning.
  - Less widespread use of the truj- stem of traer, 'to bring' in the preterite, resulting in trujieron. The truj- stem is strongly associated with TNMS rather than border areas, and is more stigmatized than the regularized suffix -jieron.
- Extension of vowel raising in those stem-changing verbs which already have it. They have the raised stem vowel -i- or -u- in any unstressed position, including the infinitive. Diphthongization in stressed positions is preserved. Examples:
  - Durmir instead of dormir, 'to sleep'. Duermo, 'I sleep', the standard first person present with diphthongization, is used in Traditional New Mexican Spanish.
  - Dicir instead of decir, 'to say'.
- Subjunctive present of haber is often haiga, instead of haya. This is common in non-standard Spanish varieties.
- Generalization of the ha- root to the first person in forms of haber as an auxiliary verb, instead of he-: "nosotros hamos comido," instead of "nosotros hemos comido," "yo ha comido" instead of "yo he comido." This appears to be a more recent development, as younger and less-educated speakers are more likely to use it. It's found across New Mexico and Southern Colorado.
- The plural forms of words which end in a stressed vowel, such as papá, 'dad' and café, 'coffee', are often formed with the suffix -ses instead of the standard -s. This is widespread in colloquial Spanish.
- The word decía 'he/she/it/they said' is often pronounced like it were dejía or dijía, like [deˈxi.a] or [diˈxi.a] rather than [deˈsi.a]. This differs from the phonological trait where the s sound can be aspirated, or pronounced like an H, which is also present throughout New Mexico and southern Colorado.

=== Peculiar verb forms ===
While many of the characteristics of Traditional New Mexican Spanish morphology are also characteristic of popular Spanish worldwide, some are more peculiar. All of these more peculiar verb forms are also found in rural Jalisco and Guanajuato, and some of these forms may also be found in Chihuahua, Durango, and Sonora, which were historically connected to New Mexico, as well as Tlaxcala. Also, all of these, with the exception of the -mos to -nos shift, are also found in Chilote Spanish in the south of Chile, and several others are found in various other Spanish dialects throughout the world.

These include:

- In TNMS, imperfect conjugations of -er and -ir verbs whose stems end in vowels end in -iba, with the preceding -i- diphthongized into the previous vowel, as in: caiban vs. caían, traiba vs. traía, creiban vs creían. Bills & Vigil (2008) view this as a retention from Latin, while Sanz (2009) views this as the result of a morphological analogy with other forms with a -b- in them. Sanz (2009) also argues that, since this -b- only appears after vowel-final roots, there is little evidence of etymological preservation.
- TNMS has a change from -mos to -nos in the first-person plural (nosotros) endings with antepenultimate stress, as in the past subjunctive, imperfect, and conditional tenses, ie: nos bañábamos to nos bañábanos, nos bañáramos to nos bañáranos, nos bañaríamos to nos bañaríanos, under the influence of the clitic nos. This also occurs in the present subjunctive, with a shift of stress, as in nos báñenos.
  - In stem-changing verbs where the stressed stem vowel diphthongizes, this results in the usual diphthongization, ie. duérmanos for durmamos, piérdanos for perdamos.
- The second-person preterite forms -ates, -ites alongside the more widespread -astes, -istes and the standard -aste, -iste.
- Nosotros ending -emos for present and -imos for past in -er/-ir verbs. In standard Spanish conjugation, verbs ending in -ir are conjugated -imos in both the present and preterite tenses, while verbs ending in -er are conjugated -emos in the present and -imos in the past. Such a merger helps speakers to distinguish the present from the preterite. An example of this change would be salemos for 'we leave', from the -ir verb salir. A merger of the -er verbs conjugations' into those of the -ir verbs is found in Chilote Spanish.
- Non-standard -g- in many verb roots, such as creiga, juigo, vaiga. Also, epenthetic -g- in aire and related words is found in TNMS.

Also, although not part of verbal morphology, Traditional New Mexican Spanish often turns the clitic nos into los. This quite uncommon change is also found in Chilote Spanish, but not in rural Mexico.

=== English influence ===
Many features of New Mexican Spanish are shared with the Spanish spoken throughout the United States, as a result of language contact with English. For example, llamar para atrás for 'to call back' and other such seemingly-calqued expressions with pa(ra a)trás are widespread. In expressions where use of the subjunctive mood is considered obligatory according to prescriptive grammar norms, New Mexicans with greater proficiency in Spanish and greater education in Spanish are more likely to actually use the subjunctive. However, it is worth noting that even in monolingual Spanish varieties, such as that of Mexico City, speakers do not always use the subjunctive mood in such supposedly obligatory situations.

== Phonology ==
The pronunciation of Spanish in New Mexico is generally "akin to that of northern Mexico", and shares the same general intonation patterns as northern Mexico. It shows the following general traits:

- New Mexican Spanish has seseo, meaning that orthographic ⟨c⟩ before /e/ and /i/, ⟨z⟩, and ⟨s⟩ represent a single phoneme, normally pronounced [s]. That is, casa ("house") and caza ("hunt") are homophones. A dental pronunciation of /s/ is at least occasionally found in rural northern New Mexico, as well as in rural areas of northern Mexico like Chihuahua and Sonora. Seseo is prevalent in nearly all of Spanish America, in the Canary Islands, and some of southern Spain, where the linguistic feature originates.
- New Mexican Spanish, like nearly all Spanish dialects, is yeísta. The sound represented by ⟨ll⟩ has merged with that represented by ⟨y⟩, and both are now pronounced like an approximant [j], like the English y sound in "yes". Before the Pueblo Revolt and subsequent reconquest of New Mexico, New Mexican Spanish actually distinguished the ⟨ll⟩ and ⟨y⟩ sounds, but dialect leveling resulted in the spread of this merger.
- /x/, the phoneme represented by ⟨j⟩ and by ⟨g⟩ before ⟨i⟩ and ⟨e⟩, is most frequently pronounced as a voiceless velar fricative [x] but may also be a voiceless glottal fricative [h] or a voiceless uvular fricative [χ].

The following tendencies are common in Traditional New Mexican Spanish, though are not universal, and many are characteristic of Border Spanish or colloquial Spanish worldwide:

Feature	Example	Phonemic	Standard	N.M. Spanish
Phrase-final epenthetical [e] or [i] after an alveolar consonant	voy a cantar	/ˈboi a kanˈtaɾ/	[ˈboj a kanˈtaɾ]	[ˈboj a kanˈtaɾe]
Phrase-final epenthetical [e] or [i] after an alveolar consonant	dame el papel	/ˈdame el paˈpel/	[ˈdam(e) el paˈpel]	[ˈdamelpaˈpeli]
Conditional elision of intervocalic /ʝ/. (Note: Occurs between /i/ and another vowel, or after /e/ and before /a/ or /o/. Y-deletion also occurs in much of northern Mexico and used to be more common there, and in several other dialects.)	ella	/ˈeʝa/	[ˈeʝa],	[ˈe.a]
Conditional elision of intervocalic /ʝ/.	estrellita	/estɾeˈʝita/	[estɾeˈʝita]	[estɾeˈita]
Insertion of [j] between vowels. (Note: Occurs in the same contexts as /ʝ/-deletion. Occasionally found in northern Mexico)	sea	/ˈsea/	[ˈsea]	[ˈseja]
/ɾ/ may be an alveolar approximant [ɹ] before alveolar consonants, or after /t/	carne	/ˈkaɾne/	[ˈkaɾne]	[ˈkaɹne]
/ɾ/ may be an alveolar approximant [ɹ] before alveolar consonants, or after /t/	letra	/ˈletɾa/	[ˈletɾa]	[ˈletɹa]
"Softening" (deaffrication) of /tʃ/ to /ʃ/ (Note: This is also a feature of the Spanish spoken in the northern Mexican states of Chihuahua and Sonora, other northwestern states of Mexico, and western Andalusia. It is found throughout New Mexico, in both the Traditional and Border dialects.)	muchachos	/muˈtʃatʃos/	[muˈtʃatʃos]	[muˈʃaʃos]
Elision of intervocalic /d/, especially in -ado (Note: This is a feature of many Spanish dialects, both in the Americas and in northern and southern Spain.)	ocupado	/okuˈpado/	[okuˈpaðo]	[okuˈpa.o]
Elision of intervocalic /d/, especially in -ado	ocupado	/okuˈpado/	[okuˈpaðo]	[okuˈpaw]
Elision of intervocalic /d/, especially in -ado	todo	/ˈtodo/	[ˈtoðo]	[ˈto.o] ~ [ˈto]
Occasional elision of intervocalic /b, g/ or initial /b/	trabajo	/tɾaˈbaxo/	[tɾaˈβaxo]	[ˈtɾaːho]
Occasional elision of intervocalic /b, g/ or initial /b/	haga	/ˈaɡa/	[ˈaɣa]	[ˈaː]
Occasional elision of intervocalic /b, g/ or initial /b/	vamos	/ˈbamos/	[ˈbamos]	[ˈamos]
Aspiration of /f/, typically before /w/. (Note: This is related to the change of Latin /f/- to Spanish /h/-, in which /f/ was pronounced as a labiodental [f], bilabial [ɸ], or glottal fricative [h], which was later deleted from pronunciation.)	me fui	/me ˈfui/	[me ˈfwi]	[me ˈhwi]
Aspiration of /f/, typically before /w/.	me fui	/me ˈfui/	[me ˈfwi]	[me ˈwi]
Aspiration of /f/, typically before /w/.	me fui	/me ˈfui/	[me ˈfwi]	[me ˈ'xwi]
Velarization of prevelar consonant voiced bilabial approximant	abuelo	/aˈbuelo/	[aˈβwelo]	[aˈɣwelo]
Syllable-initial or syllable-final aspiration or elision of /s/ (Note: Aspiration is much more common than deletion syllable-initially.) (Note: Many New Mexicans do not aspirate /s/, and while syllable-initial /s/ aspiration is found throughout New Mexico and southern Colorado it is particularly notable along the upper Rio Grande between Albuquerque and Taos.)	somos así	/ˈsomos aˈsi/	[ˈsomos aˈsi]	[ˈhomos aˈhi]
Syllable-initial or syllable-final aspiration or elision of /s/	somos así	/ˈsomos aˈsi/	[ˈsomos aˈsi]	[ˈsomoh aˈsi]
Syllable-initial or syllable-final aspiration or elision of /s/	somos así	/ˈsomos aˈsi/	[ˈsomos aˈsi]	[ˈsomo aˈsi]
Syllable-initial or syllable-final aspiration or elision of /s/	somos así	/ˈsomos aˈsi/	[ˈsomos aˈsi]	[ˈhomoh aˈhi]
Word-initial h aspiration in some words, as [x], [h], or [χ] (Note: This only occurs in a few words, all of which had /f/ in Latin. [x] is the most common realization when word-initial h is pronounced, while [χ] is the least common.)	humo	/ˈumo/	[ˈumo]	[ˈhumo]
Word-initial h aspiration in some words, as [x], [h], or [χ]	humo	/ˈumo/	[ˈumo]	[ˈxumo]
Word-initial h aspiration in some words, as [x], [h], or [χ]	humo	/ˈumo/	[ˈumo]	[ˈχumo]
Replacement of the trill [r] by the tap [ɾ] (Note: Most often in word-initial position, least often in word-medial position where it's spelt -rr-. This is more advanced in Northern New Mexico.)	Rodrigo	/roˈdɾiɡo/	[roˈðɾiɣo]	[ɾoˈðɾiɣo]
Raising of final unstressed /e/	noche	/ˈnotʃe/	[ˈnotʃe]	[ˈnotʃi]
General confusion between unstressed /e/ and /i/	vestido	/besˈtido/	[besˈtiðo]	[bisˈtiðo]
General confusion between unstressed /e/ and /i/	visita	/biˈsita/	[biˈsita]	[beˈsita]
Intervocalic /b/ pronounced as [v] (Note: Labiodentals occur over 70% of the time in high-frequency words among speakers from northern New Mexico. In low-frequency words they occur slightly less than half the time, and are affected by the word's spelling, being less frequent in words spelled with ⟨b⟩, especially in those with an English cognate spelled with ⟨b⟩.) (Note: The labiodental [v] was not attested in northern New Mexican Spanish in the early 20th century. Linguists such as Juan Bautista Rael and Aurelio Macedonio Espinosa Sr. mentioned its absence.)	caballo	/kaˈbaʝo/	[kaˈβaʝo]	[kaˈvaʝo]
Words ending in -ía sometimes becoming oxytone in colloquial speech	parecía	/paɾeˈsi.a/	[paɾeˈsi.a]	[paɾeˈsja]

There is considerable variability in the pronunciation of Spanish rhotics in New Mexico. In addition to the realization of the tapped /ɾ/ as [ɹ] before coronal consonants or after /t/ and the replacement of the trilled /r/ with a tap, Vigil (2008) has found that in Taos /r/ is often realized as a voiced apical alveolar fricative [ɹ̝].

Northern New Mexican Spanish, like Spanish in general, tends to avoid hiatus by combining or deleting vowels. One notable feature of hiatus resolution in northern New Mexico is the tendency to delete the initial /e/ of words beginning in /es/ before a consonant, such as estar, escribir, español. Thus, no escribo, 'I don't write', is pronounced [nosˈkɾivo].

Traditional New Mexican Spanish has a number of syllabic consonants. A syllabic [m̩] can arise as the result of mi or un before a bilabial consonant, as in un beso 'a kiss' [m̩ˈbeso] or mi papá 'my dad' [m̩paˈpa]. /m/, /n/ and /l/ can also become syllabic before a sequence of /i/ followed by a coronal consonant. These often, but not always, occur before the diminutive endings -ito and -ita. Some examples are Anita [aˈn̩ta], permiso 'permission' [perˈm̩so], and bolita 'little ball' [boˈl̩ta]. Finally, a syllabic /r/ appears, but only before /it/, as in burrito [buˈr̩to].

For many speakers of TNMS the syllabic m̩ derived from mi has acquired an epenthetic -/e/, becoming [em]. This is often reflected in writing, as em papá or empapá.

The vowel system in Albuquerque shows some influence from English, especially in the form of /u/-fronting. While New Mexican Spanish lacks the strong vowel reduction and centralization characteristic of English, children from Albuquerque do realize their unstressed vowels in a smaller vowel space.

== Vocabulary ==
One of the most notable characteristics of Traditional New Mexican Spanish is its vocabulary. New Mexican Spanish has retained a lot of older vocabulary, or common vocabulary with older meanings, that has been lost in other Spanish varieties. This is one of the reasons that it has often been called "archaic". It has also developed a large amount of unique vocabulary, inherited many Nahuatl loanwords from Mexican Spanish, and taken in more loanwords from neighboring indigenous languages and from English.

New Mexican Spanish retains many older variants of common function words no longer current in standard Spanish, such as asina for así, 'like this/that', cuasi for casi, 'almost', muncho for mucho, 'a lot of; many', naide or nadien for nadie, 'nobody' and onde for donde, 'where'. Many of these terms are found in the colloquial speech of other regions as well. Asina and ansina are more often used instead of así when the speaker is talking about some activity related to a traditional, rural way of life. The variant ansí is also occasionally used in northern New Mexico, but it is much less frequent than the other ways.

TNMS has also retained many content words that have been lost in other varieties. For example, TNMS retains the word ánsara, meaning 'goose'. ánsara is a feminine form of the term ánsar, which referred to wild geese, while ganso referred to the domesticated goose. That distinction seems to no longer be made, and ganso has become the typical term throughout most of the Spanish-speaking world.

Independent lexical innovations have occurred in TNMS. One example is the coining of ratón volador lit. 'flying mouse' to mean 'bat'. Also found in New Mexico is the standard term, murciélago, and a murciégalo variant. Murciégalo may be a retention of the original form, before metathesis switched the l and the g, or it may be a metathesized variant of the standard form. The standard form, and murciégalo, are mainly found in the Border Spanish area, in Albuquerque and Santa Fe, and along the Arkansas River in Colorado.

Several definite examples of metathesis have occurred in New Mexican Spanish: estógamo from estómago 'stomach', idomia from idioma 'language', pader from pared 'wall', probe from pobre 'poor' and redetir from derretir 'to melt'.

While throughout the Spanish-speaking world, trucha means 'trout', throughout much of northern New Mexico and southern Colorado, trucha is used to refer to fish in general, instead of the standard pescado 'caught fish' or pez 'live fish'. This extension is generally found in the areas north of, and including, Santa Fe and San Miguel County. The verb truchear, literally 'to trout', is also used in this area to mean 'to fish', as are other verbal expressions such as pescar trucha, ir a la trucha, andar en la trucha, and cazar trucha.

New Mexican Spanish, including both the Traditional and the Border varieties, has also regularized the gender of some nouns, such as idioma 'language' and sistema "system". That is, many speakers treat them as feminine, even though they are normatively considered masculine nouns. Residents of Martineztown, Albuquerque in the early 80s viewed the feminine form, la sistema, as slightly more correct than the traditional masculine. The regularization of feminine gender to nouns ending in -a has been expanding to younger generations.

After 1848, New Mexican Spanish has had to adopt or coin its own terms for new technological developments. One such development is the invention of the automobile. Like much of Latin America, New Mexico extended the meaning of carro 'cart' to include cars. Traditional New Mexican Spanish also ended up extending the term arrear, which referred to driving animals, to include driving cars, although the standard manejar is most common across New Mexico and southern Colorado. This is the same solution that was chosen in English. The word telefón, a loanword for 'telephone', is also used across New Mexico and southern Colorado, with little geographical patterning, being found as far south as Las Cruces. More educated speakers tend to use the standard teléfono.

The word oso 'bear' is occasionally pronounced joso in TNMS, with the nonstandard form being more common among old people.

== Language contact ==
New Mexican Spanish has been in contact with several indigenous American languages, most prominently those of the Pueblo and Navajo peoples with whom the Spaniards and Mexicans coexisted in colonial times. For centuries, Hispanics had hostile relations with the Navajo and other nomadic peoples, such as the Apache. As a result, New Mexican Spanish has borrowed few terms from their languages. Cobos (2003) gives only two examples of loans from Navajo: chihuil 'small valley' and josquere, as in the phrase andar en el josquere 'to be sowing one's wild oats'. The term gileño, referring to the Gila Apache, is cited as a loan from an Apache language. In the opposite direction, Navajo, which typically doesn't adopt many loanwords, has borrowed some terms from Spanish as well. For example, the Navajo terms for "money" (béeso) and "Anglo" (bilagáana) are borrowings from Spanish peso and americano respectively.

Hispanic contact with the Puebloans was much closer, though linguistic contact was somewhat uneven. Most of the bilinguals who mediated between Hispanics and Puebloans were themselves Puebloans since few Hispanics spoke a Pueblo language. As a result, Puebloan languages borrowed many words from Spanish, while New Mexican Spanish borrowed fewer words from Pueblo languages. For an example of loanword phonological borrowing in Taos, see Taos loanword phonology.

Most Puebloan loanwords in New Mexican Spanish have to do with people and place names, cultural artifacts, foods, and plants and herbs. One such loan is the term cunque, which comes from either a Zuni word for "bits of ground corn or cornmeal used for ceremonial purposes" or a Rio Grande Tewa term for grains of corn. It's most commonly used to mean "coffee grounds". This usage is also attested in northern Chihuahua. It's also used to mean "crumbs" by speakers from south-western New Mexico, although speakers elsewhere prefer the standard migajas.

New Mexico came into contact with the French language in the early 18th century due to interactions with French Fur trappers and traders. These interactions increased after Mexican independence. Some family names, such as Archibeque, Gurulé, and Tixier, are attributable to French influence. New Mexican Spanish has otherwise borrowed few words from French, though two prominent ones are puela, meaning "skillet", and chamuz, meaning "slipper". The only other Spanish variety where puela is used is the Brule variety of Isleño Spanish, which has been greatly influenced by French. The term pantufla is also used in New Mexico for "slipper", but it's associated with the border region, and is widely used across Latin America and Spain.

New Mexican Spanish has also been in substantial contact with American English. The contact with American English began before the Mexican–American War, when New Mexico did trade with the US, and increased after New Mexico's annexation by the US. One effect of this is semantic extension, using Spanish words with the meaning of their English cognates, such as using realizar to mean "to realize." Contact with English has also led to a general adoption of many loanwords, as well as a language shift towards English with abandonment of Spanish.

== Legal status ==
New Mexico law accommodates the use of Spanish. For instance, constitutional amendments must be approved by referendum and must be printed on the ballot in both English and Spanish. Certain legal notices must be published in English and Spanish, and the state maintains a list of newspapers for Spanish publication. Spanish was not used officially in the legislature after 1935.

Though the New Mexico Constitution (1912) provided that laws would be published in both languages for 20 years and that practice was renewed several times, it ceased in 1949. Accordingly, some describe New Mexico as officially bilingual. Others disagree and say that New Mexico's laws were designed to facilitate a transition from Spanish to English, not to protect Spanish or give it any official status.

== See also ==
- Spanish language in the United States
- Hispanos of New Mexico
- Hispanics and Latinos in New Mexico
- New Mexican English

== Sources ==
- Bills, Garland D. (1997). "New Mexican Spanish: Demise of the Earliest European Variety in the United States". American Speech. 72 (2): 154–171. doi:10.2307/455787. ISSN 0003-1283. JSTOR 455787.
- Bills, Garland D.; Vigil, Neddy A. (16 December 2008). The Spanish Language of New Mexico and Southern Colorado: A Linguistic Atlas. University of New Mexico Press. ISBN 978-0-8263-4551-6.
- Cobos, Rubén (1983). Dictionary of New Mexico and Southern Colorado Spanish (1st ed.). University of New Mexico Press. ISBN 0-89013-142-2.
- Cobos, Rubén (2003). A Dictionary of New Mexico & Southern Colorado Spanish (2nd ed.). Museum of New Mexico Press. ISBN 0-89013-452-9.
- Espinosa, Aurelio Macedonio (1909). Studies in New-Mexican Spanish: Phonology.
- Hills, E. C. (1906). "New-Mexican Spanish". PMLA. 21 (3). Modern Language Association: 706–753. doi:10.2307/456770. JSTOR 456770. S2CID 164108313.
- Kravitz, Leslie Merryl (1985). Sociolinguistic Perspectives on Decisions of Correctness in New Mexico Spanish (PhD).
- Lipski, John M. (2008). Varieties of Spanish in the United States. Georgetown University Press. ISBN 978-1-58901-651-4.
- Lipski, John M. (2016). "Spanish vocalic epenthesis: the phonetics of sonority and the mora" (PDF). In Núñez-Cedeño, Rafael A. (ed.). The Syllable and Stress: Studies in Honor of James W. Harris. Berlin/Boston: De Gruyter Mouton. pp. 245–269. doi:10.1515/9781614515975-010. ISBN 978-1-61451-736-8.
- Lozano, Anthony G. (1994). "San Luis Valley Lexicon: Relics and Innovations". Confluencia. 9 (2): 121–127. ISSN 0888-6091. JSTOR 27922222.
- Ross, L. Ronald (1980). "La Supresion de /y/ en el Español Chicano". Hispania (in Spanish). 63 (3): 552–554. doi:10.2307/341016. JSTOR 341016.
- Sanz, Israel (2009). The Diachrony of New Mexican Spanish, 1683-1926: Philology, Corpus Linguistics and Dialect Change (PhD). University of California, Berkeley. ProQuest 193999397.
- Sanz, Israel; Villa, Daniel J. (2011). "The Genesis of Traditional New Mexican Spanish: The Emergence of a Unique Dialect in the Americas". Studies in Hispanic and Lusophone Linguistics. 4 (2): 417–442. doi:10.1515/shll-2011-1107. S2CID 163620325.
- Vergara Wilson, Damián (June 2015). "A Panorama of Traditional New Mexican Spanish". Informes del Observatorio / Observatorio Reports. doi:10.15427/OR012-06/2015EN.
- Vigil, Donny (2008). The traditional Spanish of Taos, New Mexico: Acoustic, phonetic and phonological analyses (PhD). Purdue University.
- Waltermire, Mark; Valtierrez, Mayra (2017). "The trill isn't gone: Rhotic variation in southern New Mexican Spanish". Journal of the Linguistic Association of the Southwest. 32 (2): 133–161.
- Young, Robert W.; Morgan, William Sr. (1987). The Navajo Language: A grammar and colloquial dictionary (Revised ed.). Albuquerque: University of New Mexico Press. ISBN 978-0-8263-1014-9.
- Zepeda Torres, Miguel Ángel (2018). Debuccalization of /s/ and Historic /f/ Variation in Traditional New Mexican Spanish: an Optimality Theory Approach (PhD). University of California, Davis.
