= Rubén Cobos =

American linguist of New Mexican Spanish

- Rubén Cobos
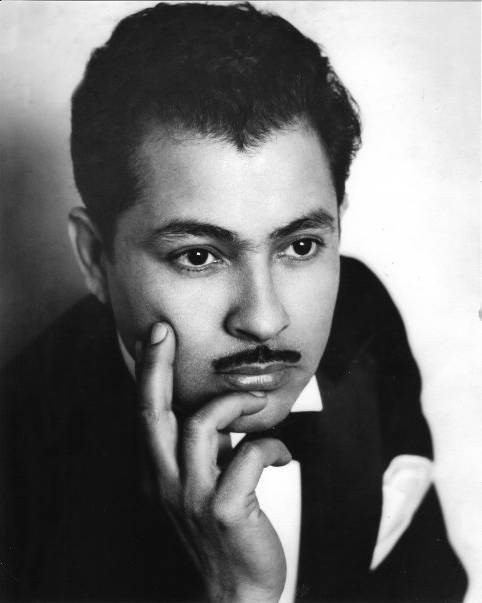
- Photograph of American folklorist and linguist Rubén Cobos.
- Born: November 11, 1911; Ciudad Porfirio Díaz, Coahuila (now Piedras Negras, Coahuila)
- Died: November 22, 2010 (aged 99); Albuquerque, New Mexico
- Citizenship: Mexico (by birth), United States (by naturalization)
- Occupations: Folklorist, Linguist, Professor, journalist, and musician
- Years active: 1927-2010
- Known for: First dictionary of New Mexican Spanish

Academic background
- Education: University of New Mexico (BA, MA; Stanford University (PhD)

Academic work
- Era: 1938-2010
- Discipline: Spanish, English, French, Italian, Portuguese, and German Linguist; Folklorist of the American Southwest
- Sub-discipline: New Mexican Spanish
- Institutions: Normal University (now New Mexico Highlands University), University of New Mexico (in Albuquerque, Ecuador, and Spain), Stanford University, Colorado College, University of Nevada, Reno
- Main interests: New Mexican Spanish, Mexican American folklore, Folklore of the United States
- Notable works: A Dictionary of New Mexico and Southern Colorado Spanish
- Notable ideas: New Mexican Spanish is a unique dialect distinct from northern Mexican Spanish
- Website: Ruben Cobos Collection of Southwestern Folklore and Folk Music

Rubén Cobos (November 11, 1911 — November 22, 2010) was a Mexican American folklorist, linguist, professor, journalist, and musician whose work focused on the language and culture of the Southwestern United States. Cobos was born in Piedras Negras, Coahuila in 1911. Cobos wrote the first dictionary of New Mexican Spanish, A Dictionary of New Mexico and Southern Colorado Spanish. Cobos was multilingual and spoke Spanish, English, French, Italian, Portuguese and German.

Cobos was born in Piedras Negras, Coahuila in 1911 and moved to San Antonio, Texas with his family in 1925 after the death of his father. In 1927 the family moved to Albuquerque, New Mexico where Cobos starting taking classes at the Menaul School. Cobos realized the Spanish spoken in New Mexico was distinct from Mexico and Texas, and that there was a difference in dialects between northern and southern New Mexico. Cobos attended the University of New Mexico before serving in World War II. In 1944 he became the first Hispanic to be hired as a full-time professor at the University of New Mexico. Cobos taught Spanish and folklore there from 1944 until 1977. Cobos' life work was A Dictionary of New Mexico and Southern Colorado Spanish, released in two editions in 1983 and 2003. He died in 2010 at his home in Albuquerque.

== History ==
=== Early life and education ===
Cobos was born in 1911 in what was then known was Ciudad Porfirio Díaz, Mexico. During the 1910-1920 Mexican Revolution, the city was renamed Piedras Negras. Cobos' younger siblings Noe and Rebecca died during the 1918 Spanish flu epidemic. After his father died the family moved to San Antonio, Texas. The family moved to Albuquerque in 1927 to treat his sister Consuelo's tuberculosis. Since Consuelo was a Presbyterian missionary, the Presbyterian Church arranged the move sanatorium.

Cobos attended the University of New Mexico from 1932 to 1936, graduating with honors. Cobos was too poor to afford college, but Dean James Fulton Zimmerman allowed him to attend if Cobos did maintenance work on campus. Cobos studied Spanish, English, French, Italian, Portuguese and German.

=== Career ===
Immediately after graduation, Cobos would teach Spanish, natural sciences, the history of the United States, and coach basketball in Wagon Mound, New Mexico in 1937 and 1938. In 1938 Cobos taught and at Normal University (now New Mexico Highlands University). As a physical education teacher, he trained "a kind of CCC camp... a little army" of students to be ready for a possible world war since Europe was "not looking too well." He received his master's degree from UNM in 1938. Cobos was drafted during World War II and served as a translator and language consultant. Cobos was discharged from the army in 1944 and became a professor at UNM. After Ph.D. study at Stanford University Cobos and taught there before returning to UNM. Cobos taught Spanish, Southwestern United States Hispanic American folklore, and Ibero-American civilization. He became a professor emeritus in 1977.

== A Dictionary of New Mexico and Southern Colorado Spanish ==
Rubén Cobos was the first person to write a dictionary of New Mexican Spanish. The first edition of A Dictionary of New Mexico and Southern Colorado Spanish was released in 1983.

Cobos wrote in the introduction how

A dialect of Spanish has been spoken uninterruptedly since the end of the seventeenth century in New Mexico, and since the middle of the nineteenth century in southern Colorado. … Since the early 1940s, with the help of my students at the University of New Mexico and the cooperation of villagers in their sixties, seventies and eighties, I have recorded a large body of New Mexico and southern Colorado Indo-Hispanic folklore materials on magnetic tape. Included in this collection are hundreds of personal interviews and countless examples of corridos and inditas (local ballads), children's games and songs, folktales, chistes (anecdotes), jokes, home remedies, recipes, narratives dealing with local events, proverbs, riddles, songs, versos (rhymed quatrains), and witch stories and accounts of witchcraft. These materials gave me the majority of terms. ...

THE SPANISH SPOKEN in rural areas of New Mexico and southern Colorado can be described as a regional type of language made up of archaic (sixteenth- and seventeenth-century) Spanish; Mexican Indian words, mostly from the Náhuatl; a few indigenous Rio Grande Indian words; words and idiomatic expressions peculiar to the Spanish of Mexico (the so-called mexicanismos); local New Mexico and southern Colorado vocabulary; and countless language items from English which the Spanish-speaking segment of the population has borrowed and adapted for everyday use. New Mexico and southern Colorado Spanish, quite uniform over the whole geographical area, has survived by word of mouth for over four hundred years in a land that until very recent times was almost completely isolated from other Spanish-speaking centers. … offshoot of the Spanish of northern Mexico, especially with respect to usage and pronunciation. ...
in the 1980s, the dialect is losing its struggle for existence because English is the official language of the area (notwithstanding state constitutional articles or amendments to the contrary–especially in New Mexico). The Hispano population in the region lives in an Anglo-oriented environment where all facets of daily living (commerce, education, entertainment, local and national news communications, politics, etc.) use English for their expression. ...

Most young Hispano parents in their twenties and thirties are no longer speaking Spanish to their children. If these young people know Spanish themselves, they find it very difficult and inconvenient to transmit it to their offspring.

Cobos released a second revised and expanded edition of A Dictionary of New Mexico and Southern Colorado Spanish in 2003.

== Retirement, death, and legacy ==
Cobos remained in Albuquqerque after his retirement from UNM. Cobos would spend his time “looking after little things” around his house while also updating his folklore collection. Cobos published a second edition of his A Dictionary of New Mexico and Southern Colorado Spanish in 2003, when he was in his early 90s.

Cobos died on November 22, 2011, at the age of 99 years and eleven days.

== Personal life ==
Cobos' hobbies included "building telescopes, doing carpentry work and watching old movies," as well as tending to his collection of folklore.

Cobos identified as both Mexican American and "with the New Mexican Hispanics" because he "married into New Mexico families."

== Sources ==
- Cobos, Rubén (1983). A Dictionary of New Mexico and Southern Colorado Spanish (1st ed.). University of New Mexico Press. ISBN 0-89013-142-2.
- Cobos, Rubén (2003). A Dictionary of New Mexico & Southern Colorado Spanish (2nd ed.). Museum of New Mexico Press. ISBN 0-89013-452-9.
- Cobos, Rubén (1973). Refranes: Southwestern Spanish Proverbs (1st ed.). Santa Fe: Museum of New Mexico Press.
- Cobos, Evelia (2010). They That Laugh Win: To Dr. Ruben Cobos with Love: A Memoir. Río Grande Books.
- García, Nasario (2011). An Indelible imprint: Rubén Cobos, a Multi-Talented Personality. Río Grande Books.
