= Aurelio Macedonio Espinosa Jr. =

Neomexicano American author of Spanish folklore

- Aurelio Macedonio Espinosa Jr.
- Born: Domingo Tomás Hernández; May 3, 1907; Albuquerque, New Mexico, US
- Died: July 4, 2004 (aged 97); Palo Alto, California, US
- Occupation: Professor

Aurelio Macedonio Espinosa Jr. (May 3, 1907 – July 4, 2004) was a professor at Stanford University and an expert on Spanish linguistics, focusing on Spanish American folklore. He was the son of Aurelio Macedonio Espinosa Sr.

== Personal life ==
Espinosa was born in 1907 in Albuquerque, New Mexico. His parents were Aurelio Macedonio Espinosa Sr. (1880–1958) and Maria Margarita Garcia Espinosa (1886–1958), and he had four siblings.

He later married Iraida Espinosa, with whom he had two daughters and a son, Aurelio Ramon Espinosa. He died in Palo Alto in 2004, at the age of 97.

== Career ==
Espinosa Jr. received his bachelor's degree at Stanford University in 1928 and his doctorate at the University of Madrid (1932). Between 1932 and 1936, he collaborated in the Linguistic Atlas of Spain and Portugal (Atlas Lingüístico de la Península Ibérica ALPI). While he collaborated with the Atlas, he took the time to compile Spanish folklore, although his work was interrupted by the Spanish Civil War. He then worked as a Spanish professor at Harvard University and during World War II, he taught Spanish, Portuguese, and Russian at the U.S. Military Academy.

In 1945, he was recognized as a member of the Real Academia de la Lengua Española (Royal Spanish Academy). He became a part of Stanford University faculty in 1946, the same year his father retired. He retired and became professor emeritus in 1972, after 22 years at Stanford, holding positions as first the Executive Head of the Department of Modern European Languages, and later the Department of Spanish and Portuguese. With the help of folklorist Julio Camarena Laucirica, at the end of the 1980s, he was able to edit the stories he collected in Castilla and Leon before the Civil War.

In 1995, he was recognized in the El Centro Chicano y Latino's Hall of Fame, the year it was established.

== Works ==
Espinosa did not only publish the folk stories he collected, but he also co-wrote Spanish textbooks that were widely used in college classrooms.

- Turk, Laurel Herbert, Carlos A. SoleÌ, and Aurelio Macedonio Espinosa. Foundation Course in Spanish. Lexington, MA: D.C. Heath, 1989. Print.
- Mastering Spanish. Laurel Herbert Turk, Aurelio Macedonio Espinosa. Heath, Jan 1, 1979
- "Arcaísmos dialectales. La conservación de «s» y «z» sonoras en Cáceres y Salamanca", en Revista de Filología Española, Anejo XIX, 1935.
- Cuentos populares de España, 3 vols. Stanford, California: Stanford University Press, 1923–1923.
- Cuentos populares de España. Buenos Aires y México: Espasa-Calpe, 1946.
