= Aurelio Macedonio Espinosa Sr. =

Neomexicano American author of Spanish folklore

- Born: September 12, 1880; San Luis Valley, Colorado, US
- Died: September 4, 1958 (aged 77)
- Occupations: Author, professor

Aurelio Macedonio Espinosa Sr. (September 12, 1880 – September 4, 1958), was an American author and professor of Mexican heritage. He was a professor at Stanford University. He was known for his promotion of the study of the Spanish language and literature.

== Personal life ==
Espinosa, one of 14 siblings, was born in El Carnero, Colorado in the mostly Hispanic San Luis Valley, on September 12, 1880, to Celso and Rafaela Espinosa. His parents, descendants of the first New Mexicans to settle in Colorado in the mid-1800s, lived on a homestead and raised cattle and sheep. He learned about Spanish folk tales and ballads from his uncle, Don Ramon Martinez, who lived in the mountains of southern Colorado. The Espinosas moved to Del Norte, Colorado, by 1895 when Espinosa began attending the Del Norte High School. He graduated in June 1898. The family then moved to Boulder, Colorado, so Espinosa and his older brother, Tobias, could attend college there.

He married in 1905, to Margarita García, also of New Mexican Spanish descent, and had five children, Margarita, Aurelio, Jose Manuel, Josefita, and Francisco Ramon. Four of their children became educators. He died on September 4, 1958, after a long illness.

== Career ==
Espinosa attended the University of Colorado in Boulder, where he received his Bachelor of Arts degree in 1902. Immediately after, he started work at the University of New Mexico, where he became a professor of modern languages. He received his MA from University of Colorado, and in 1909, he completed his Ph.D. cum laude at the University of Chicago. His dissertation earned him the attention of several people in the United States, one of the most noted, Prof. Ford of Harvard University, who recommended Espinosa to the head of the Romanic Languages department at Stanford University, who offered him a position in the department. He joined Stanford faculty in 1910 and remained there until his retirement. He became the chairman of the Department of Romanic Languages from 1933 to 1947. He retired from his position at Stanford University in 1947.

He was known for his association with major figures also in his field of studies. He became a lifelong friend and colleague of Ramón Menéndez Pidal, to whom he presented 200 versions of forty uncollected ballads in Spain (similar to what his son would do later before the Spanish civil war). He also corresponded with Fernando Ortiz. He also worked with anthropologists, especially Franz Boas and Elsie Clews Parsons. With Boas, he studied the influence of Hispanic folklore among the Pueblo Indians of New Mexico.

He was also amongst the founders of the Societe Internationale de Dialectologie Romane in 1909, the American Association of Teachers of Spanish in 1917 (later president in 1928), and the Linguistic Society of America in 1925. He was president of the American Folklore Society for the years 1924 and 1925. The Spanish government granted him the name of Commander of the Royal Order of Isabel la Católica; he received the Grand Cross of the Order of Alfonso el Sabio (Alfonso the Wise), and was a member of the Instituto de Cultura Hispánica. He was a member of the Royal Spanish Academy, the Hispanic Society of America, and the Academia Hispanoamericana de Ciencias y Letras de Cádiz.

Espinosa received two honorary degrees: one from the University of San Francisco, and the other from the University of New Mexico.

== Legacy ==
Espinosa was one of the first academic folklorists who took interest in using American materials, creating a precise methodology and framework to folklore studies. He started his examination and analysis of the Spanish language more than fifty years after the U.S.-Mexico War and the subsequent occupation of New Mexico by Anglo-Americans, which means he came to study a cultural identity that was disrupted and often contested.

Despite his conservative politics, Espinosa did contribute largely to the study of New Mexican culture and how intertwined that culture is with that of its Spanish settlers during the sixteenth and seventeenth century. He began with his dissertation, Studies in New-Mexican Spanish (1909), which was published in three parts (Phonology, Morphology, the English Elements) between the years 1909 and 1914. In this work, he emphasizes how the Spanish dialect spoken in New Mexico is a perfect conservation of the Spanish that was first introduced during the sixteenth century. He also described the fusion between the two languages (English and Spanish) that became common in Northern New Mexico due to the settling of Anglo-Americans; this fusion included the incorporation of English-origin words and the Hispanicization of certain words. Along with the study of the interaction between the languages, he also studied Spanish ballads, folktales, proverbs, riddles, children's games, and nursery rhymes. He was the first to collect vast numbers of versions of the same ballads/folktales (especially noted is the Tar Tar Baby story) and therefore create a lens into the New Mexican and Spanish ideas of morality and ethics, human virtue and failing, their political and social views, and their history.

He did extensive research with Franz Boas on the influence of Spanish on the Pueblo Indians, natives of the New Mexico region. They looked into the Spanish influence on prayers, aspects of their dances and ceremonies on Catholic religious days, influences on their folktales and nursery rhymes, and the appearance of Spanish ballads in the oral tradition of the Pueblo Indians. He wrote a number of articles for the Catholic Encyclopedia.

== Works ==
Many of his works were also published in France, Spain, and Germany, hence his international recognition.

== See also ==
- John Alden Mason
