= Juan Bautista Rael =

American linguist

- Born: August 14, 1900; Arroyo Hondo, northern New Mexico
- Died: November 8, 1993 (aged 93)
- Occupations: Professor, ethnographer, linguist, and folklorist

Juan Bautista Rael (August 14, 1900 – November 8, 1993) was an American ethnographer, linguist, and folklorist who was a pioneer in the study of the people, stories, and language of Northern New Mexico and southern Colorado in the Southwestern United States. Rael was a professor at Stanford University. He donated his considerable collection of ethnographic materials to the Library of Congress.

== Childhood and education ==
Rael was born in the northern New Mexico village of Arroyo Hondo, near Taos, to an ethnic Spanish family whose ancestors dated to colonial times. Rael was one of five children (four sons and one daughter) of José Ignacio Rael and Soledad Santistevan. His father was a merchant and sheep rancher.

Rael's parents sent him away to school because of limited educational options in their town. He attended elementary school at Saint Michael's College in Santa Fe, New Mexico. He next attended Christian Brothers' College in St. Louis, Missouri, where he earned a high school diploma.

In 1923, Rael completed his B.A. in linguistics and folklore from St. Mary's College in Oakland, California. In 1927, Rael received his M.A. from the University of California, Berkeley.

== Career ==
Rael taught for several years as an associate professor at the University of Oregon before beginning his doctoral studies. He began to focus his research on the Alabados, or religious songs, of the Hispano region of Northern New Mexico and southern Colorado. He was familiar with these from childhood. He also began to study the folk and nativity plays of Mexico and New Mexico.

In 1933, Rael began his doctoral studies at Stanford University, invited by and under the supervision of folklorist Aurelio Espinosa. Rael was awarded his Ph.D. in linguistics in 1937. His dissertation was on the phonology and morphology of New Mexican Spanish. He did pioneering work in the collection of folktales in many forms, as well as the nativity plays typical of Christmas celebrations. Rael collected more than 410 folktales, tracing some to European origins. It was published in 1977 under the title Cuentos Españoles de Colorado y Nuevo Mexico (Spanish Folk Tales of Colorado and New Mexico). It is the most extensive collection of folk tales from the oral tradition in Spanish America.

In 1946, Rael began creating opportunities for students to study in Mexico. In 1953 he formalized the program by founding the University of Guadalajara Summer School, which he directed for 18 years. Courses included language classes, Mexican art, geography, history, literature and Spanish literature. The summer school was sponsored jointly by the and the University of Arizona. The Summer School continues as part of the Foreign Studies Program of the University of Arizona.Universidad Autónoma de Guadalajara

== Marriage and family ==
In 1923, the year Rael graduated from college, he married Quirina de la Luz Espinosa, daughter of Francisco Antonio Espinosa and Maria Rosabel Lobato of Antonito, Conejos County, Colorado. They had four children together, each of whom also went on to graduate from Stanford University, as did some of the Raels' grandchildren. From 1933 on, they lived near Stanford University, where his academic career was based.

== Legacy and honors ==
- 1974, elected to membership in the Academia Norteamericana de la Lengua Española
- 1983, named a Corresponding Member of the Royal Spanish Academy.

He also received honors from several Mexican institutions and from the city of Guadalajara.

== Works ==
- "New Mexican Wedding Songs", published in Southern Folklore Quarterly, June 1940
- "New Mexican Spanish Feasts", published in California Folklore Quarterly, 1942
- Rael, Juan Bautista (1937). A Study of the Phonology and Morphology of New Mexican Spanish, Based on a Collection of 410 Folk-tales. University of Pennsylvania.
- An Annotated Bibliography of Spanish Folklore in New Mexico and Southern Colorado (with Marjorie Tully). University of New Mexico Press, 1950
- The New Mexican 'Alabado', Stanford University Press, 1951
- The Sources and Diffusion of the Mexican Shepherds' Plays. Guadalajara, Mexico: Librería La Joyita, 1965
- "Introducción a los Cuentos Populares Nuevomejicanos", published in Boletín de la Academia Norteamericana de la Lengua Española, New York, 1976
- Cuentos Españoles de Colorado y Nuevo Mexico (Spanish Folk Tales of Colorado and New Mexico), Santa Fe: Museum of New Mexico Press, 1977

== See also ==
- Chicano English
