= Nicolas Pino =

Mexican military leader and U.S. Union Army officer

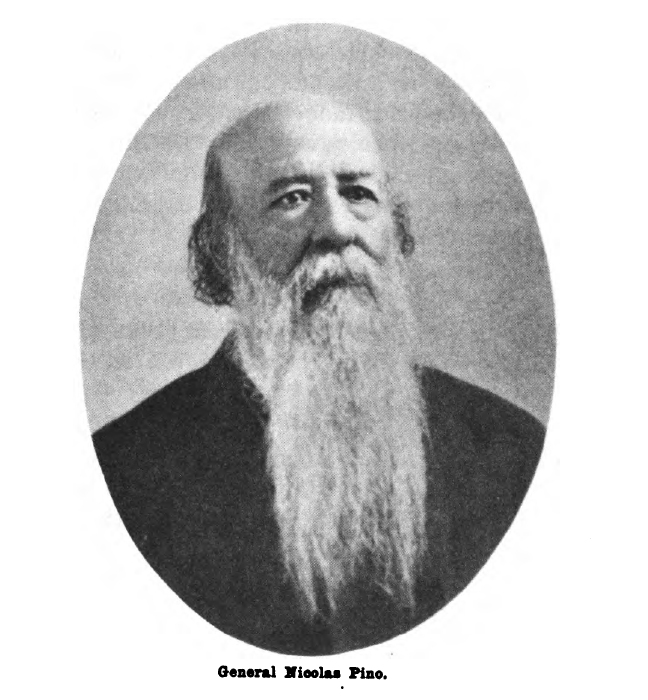
Photograph of Pino from Twitchell's The History of the Military Occupation of the Territory of New Mexico (1909)

Nicolas Pino (1819–1896) was a Mexican loyalist, civil and military leader who participated in planned resistance and rebellion against the U.S. occupation of New Mexico. Following the Treaty of Guadalupe Hidalgo, he swore allegiance to the United States and became a Union officer during American Civil War, rising to the rank of brigadier general on September 9, 1861. He later served in the New Mexico Territorial legislature.

== Capture of Santa Fe & Revolt of 1846 ==
The Pino brothers—Facundo, Miguel E. and Nicolas—were all influential in the affairs of Nuevo Mexico at the time of General Kearny's capture of Santa Fe. The Pino family members held prominent positions under the Mexican government and were reputed fighters of daring and courage. They raised companies and procured arms and ammunition in response to Governor Manuel Armijo's call for volunteers in preparation to resist Kearney at Apache Canyon, but were disgusted and dismayed when Armijo disbanded the forces and fled to Mexico. None of the Pinos immediately took Kearny's required oath of allegiance to the U.S. following the occupation, still considering themselves citizens of the Mexican republic. Soon after, they participated in meetings led by Don Diego Archuleta at a home near the military church, La Castrenza, in Santa Fe, where Pino's cousin, Tomas Ortiz, was elected as governor with Archuleta as commanding general. A rebellion was planned for December 19, 1846, and later postponed to Christmas Eve. Mexican loyalist emissaries were sent out to all nearest points demanding that the people take part in the uprising in Santa Fe upon the third bell for midnight mass (Spanish: Missa del Gallo), when all of the American officers would be captured. This plan fell through after it became known to Donaciano Vigil, by way of the proprietress of the city's largest gambling house, Tules Barcelona. Vigil informed General Sterling Price, of the Second Missouri Mounted Volunteers, who had a number of conspirators arrested, including Nicolas Pino. Ortiz escaped in the garb of a servant girl and fled to Chihuahua. Price stationed soldiers at the homes of every known revolutionist.

== American allegiance: Taos Revolt, Civil War & Territorial Legislature ==
Following the failed revolt of 1846, neither Miguel E. nor Nicolas Pino participated in any further resistance movements. Nicolas took the oath of allegiance to the United States after he was released from prison and enlisted in Captain St. Vrain's company of volunteers following the assassination of governor Charles Bent, participating in the defeat of the insurgents at the Taos Revolt with his friend Manuel Chaves.

After the treaty of peace with Mexico, the Pino brothers were considered to be amongst the most loyal to the United States government. All of the brothers held both civil and military positions of trust. Miguel and Nicolas both commanded substantial bodies of volunteers during the American Civil War. Until their deaths, there was always a Pino in the house or council of the territorial legislative assembly. Facundo Pino served several times as president of the council, as did Miguel in 1865 and 1866. Nicolas served as council president in 1869 and as a council member in 1873 and 1878. Tomas Ortiz returned to New Mexico and also served in the Territorial Legislature.

During the American Civil War, Nicolas led the 2nd New Mexico Militia. On February 25, 1862, Colonel Pino and his 200 Hispano militiamen attempted to make a stand against Brigadier General Henry Hopkins Sibley at the town of Socorro, New Mexico, but they quickly surrendered when the Texans opened fire with a piece of artillery. His brother, Colonel Miguel Pino, led 590 men in the 2nd New Mexico Volunteers.

== Parents & death ==
Nicolas' father was Pedro Bautista Pino, the only person to represent New Mexico in the Cortes of Spain. In 1811, while in Cádiz, Pedro wrote a short history of New Mexico contained in a report to the king. His mother, Ana Maria, was the daughter of Ana Gertrudis Ortiz Niño Ladron de Guevarra and Juan Domingo Baca, and a granddaughter of Pedro de Bustamante, a governor and captain-general of the Province of New Mexico.

Nicolas survived his brothers. He died at the age of 77 in November 1896 and is buried in the village cemetery in Galisteo.

Pino, his brother Miguel, and their mother Ana Maria all owned Indigenous slaves. The Pino family did not benefit from the enslavement of Black people and thus had little economic incentive to endorse Black chattel slavery or the Confederacy, with Miguel Pino being actively opposed to the enslavement of Black people despite his family's ownership of enslaved Indigenous people. The enslaved Indigenous women who were forced to work on Nicolas Pino's ranch not only "performed services for their masters" but also "symbolized social wealth".
