= Ramón Ortiz y Miera =

Mexican priest (1814–1896)

- Born: 28 January 1814; Santa Fé, Viceroyalty of New Spain (now New Mexico, U.S.)
- Died: 11 March 1896 (aged 82); Ciudad Juárez, Chihuahua, Mexico
- Occupation: Priest

Ramón Ortiz y Miera (commonly Padre Ramón Ortiz) (28 January 1814 (Note: 1814 is commonly given as his birth date, but one source says he was born in 1813.) – 11 March 1896) was a Mexican priest who helped organize armed resistance during the Mexican–American War of 1846 to 1848, and who was frustrated by the U.S. authorities in his efforts to repatriate Hispanic residents from New Mexico to the republic of Mexico after the war.

== Early career ==
Ramón Ortiz y Miera was born in Santa Fé, Nuevo México (now New Mexico), on 28 January 1814, the youngest of eleven children of don Antonio Ortiz and doña Teresa Miera. The Ortiz family of Santa Fé was well-connected, descended from early Spanish settlers in Mexico. His father was one of the three leading candidates to be the first (and, as it turned out, the last) representative for New Mexico in the Cortes Generales of Spain. (Note: In May 1822 the Mexican War of Independence came to a climax and Spanish rule was ended.) When Ramón Ortiz was baptized his godparents were the governor of New Mexico at the time, Lieutenant Colonel don José Manrique, and the governor's wife, doña Inez Tellez. Ortiz's sister, Ana María, married Lieutenant Colonel José Antonio Vizcarra, who was governor of New Mexico from 1822–1823.

At the age of 18 Ramón Ortiz moved to Durango to study theology under Bishop José Antonio Laureano de Zubiría. He was appointed parish priest of Nuestra Señora de Guadalupe in El Paso del Norte (now Ciudad Juárez) in 1836, where he had a spacious house surrounded by orchards and vineyards. He was known for his hospitality to visitors. These included Northerners, as recorded by Susan Shelby Magoffin.

== Conflict with the United States ==
In 1841 the Texan Santa Fe Expedition was launched by a group of soldiers and traders from the Republic of Texas, pushing through New Mexico towards Santa Fe. Before reaching Santa Fe the expedition was defeated by Mexican troops, and the survivors were captured and marched to Mexico City. When the Texan prisoners passed through El Paso, maltreated by their captors and exhausted by the rigors of the desert crossing, Padre Ortiz gave them food and drink and helped them recover. However, he was a fierce nationalist and took advantage of the pulpit to communicate his hostility to United States expansionism.

When the Mexican–American War broke out in the spring of 1846, Ortiz helped to organize armed resistance. He was captured at the Battle of El Brazito on 25 December 1846. Colonel Alexander William Doniphan took him along as a hostage on his advance to the city of Chihuahua, while allowing him to perform his priestly duties to the Catholics among the U.S. troops. Ortiz was a witness to the Battle of the Sacramento River and to the defeat of Chihuahua. After administering to the casualties, he was given his freedom. Ortiz had powerful friends, and after the war he temporarily left the church to run for congress, winning a seat in Mexico City. On 13 May 1848 he voted against ratifying the Treaty of Guadalupe Hidalgo, which had been concluded on 2 February 1848 between Mexico and the United States. He was in the minority, and the motion to ratify the treaty was passed.

== Repatriation commission ==
Father Ortiz was made commissioner for repatriating Mexican families from New Mexico after the war, leaving for the north in September 1848. He was held up in El Paso del Norte by poor weather, and began to actively recruit migrants while there, finding many people in the border region keen to be helped to move to Chihuahua State. The majority of the people seeking repatriation were from the poorest classes. They either had no land or expected that what they had would be taken from them. They were afraid that the U.S. would treat them as slaves. More immediately, the combination of war and bad weather had left them in a desperate economic condition.

In April 1849 Father Ortiz arrived in Santa Fe, where he was welcomed by Governor John M. Washington and Territorial Secretary Donaciano Vigil, who both thought he was unlikely to succeed and even offered to supply transport to Mexicans seeking repatriation. Their mood changed quickly when the people of San Miguel del Vado alone submitted 900 requests for repatriation assistance. Vigil, backed up by the U.S. military, said that Ortiz could not conduct recruitment in person since his presence would disturb the peace. Ortiz then appointed agents to recruit New Mexico families, and they met with considerable success. In response Vigil cracked down further on recruitment. The United States position was that the treaty of Guadalupe Hidalgo had not covered repatriation, and Ortiz's activity was therefore illegal.

== Later career ==
In mid-1849 Ortiz was forced to return from the United States to Chihuahua, where the Governor, General Ángel Trías, granted him powers to "announce and give possession of the land needed to form new towns." The Mexican government made an official protest to the United States over the way in which Father Ortiz had been harassed. Almost 4,000 people from New Mexico eventually decided to make the move south. The main towns in Chihuahua built by repatriates from New Mexico were Guadelupe (1849), La Mesilla (1850), Refugio de los Amoles (1852) and San Tómas de Iturbide (1853). However, the Mexican government's promises of assistance to the repatriates with supplies of seed, were not fulfilled. Some of the colonists moved again, often to the United States. The repatriate settlers in the Mesilla valley including La Mesilla, Refugio de los Amoles (now Vado) and San Tómas de Iturbide (now Berino) found themselves transferred back to the United States involuntarily in 1854 as a result of the Gadsden Purchase.

In Texas and California, many Mexican families had been attacked and expelled from the United States. By contrast, the New Mexican military government did not want to see the state depopulated. Since the Mexican government did not provide the promised incentives to repatriates, as Father Ortiz had urged, most residents of New Mexico chose to remain in the United States. The Treaty of Guadalupe Hidalgo gave guarantees that they could retain their property if they chose to remain. They could formally elect Mexican citizenship or, by default, would become U.S. citizens after one year. Some, such as Miguel Antonio Otero and Donaciano Vigil, became wealthy and prominent in politics in the United States.

In 1853 Ortiz was subject to an investigation by the Foreign Ministry into his activities as repatriation commissioner in which he was accused of mishandling funds allocated to the new colonies. The main complainant was the last (acting) Governor of New Mexico, Juan Bautista Vigil y Alarid. Ortiz was replaced by the prominent local politician Guadalupe Miranda. Becoming disillusioned with politics, Ortiz returned to parochial duties in El Paso del Norte. He died there of cancer on 11 March 1896, and was buried after a funeral that was attended by thousands of people.

== Sources ==
- Alcaraz, Ramón; Barreiro, Alejo; Castillo, José María; Escalante, Félix María; José María Iglesias; Manuel Muñoz; Ramón Ortiz; Manuel Payno; Guillermo Prieto; Ignacio Ramírez; Napoleón Saborío; Francisco Schiafino; Francisco Segura; Pablo María Torrescano; Francisco Urquidi (1850). Apuntes para la historía de la guerra entre México y los Estados-Unidos. J. Wiley. p. 447.
- Archer, Christon I. (2007). The Birth of Modern Mexico, 1780–1824. Rowman & Littlefield. ISBN 9780742556027.
- Hernández, José Angel (2012-04-30). Mexican American Colonization During the Nineteenth Century: A History of the U.S.-Mexico Borderlands. Cambridge University Press. ISBN 978-1-107-01239-4.
- MacIel, David; Gonzales-Berry, Erlinda (2000-09-01). The Contested Homeland: A Chicano History of New Mexico. UNM Press. ISBN 978-0-8263-2199-2.
- Mora, Anthony P. (2010-12-27). Border Dilemmas: Racial and National Uncertainties in New Mexico, 1848–1912. Duke University Press. ISBN 978-0-8223-4797-2.
- Olivas, Michael A. (2006-10-31). Colored Men and Hombres Aquí: Hernández V. Texas and the Emergence of Mexican American Lawyering. Arte Publico Press. ISBN 978-1-55885-476-5.
- Ortiz Hill, Claire (2012). "Padre Ramon Ortiz y Miera (1814–1896)".
- Prince, L. Bradford (August 2008). The Student's History of New Mexico: Facsimile of the Original 1921 Second Edition. Sunstone Press. ISBN 978-0-86534-694-9.
- Schultz, Jeffrey D. (2000). "Miguel Antonio Otero (1829–1882)". Encyclopedia of Minorities in American Politics: Hispanic Americans and Native Americans. Greenwood Publishing Group. ISBN 978-1-57356-149-5.
- Sisneros, Samuel E (Fall 1999). "El Paseño, Padre Ramón Ortiz". Password. 44 (33). The El Paso County Historical Society. Archived from the original on 2012-05-05.
- Sisneros, Samuel (2001). "Repatriation from New Mexico to Northern Chihuahua". Archived from the original on 2012-04-06.
- Sisneros, Samuel (2012). "Juan Bautista Vigil y Alarid (1792-1866): Last Mexican Governor of New Mexico". New Mexico State Record Center and Archives. Archived from the original on 2012-05-05.
- Soares, André; Slide, Anthony (2010-04-19). Beyond Paradise: The Life of Ramon Novarro. Univ. Press of Mississippi. ISBN 978-1-60473-457-7.
- Vigil, Maurilio E. (2012). "Vigil, Donaciano". Archived from the original on 2011-04-25.
- Weber, David J. (2003-12-01). Foreigners in Their Native Land: Historical Roots of the Mexican Americans. UNM Press. ISBN 978-0-8263-3510-4.
