= Susan Shelby Magoffin =

American writer (1827–1855)

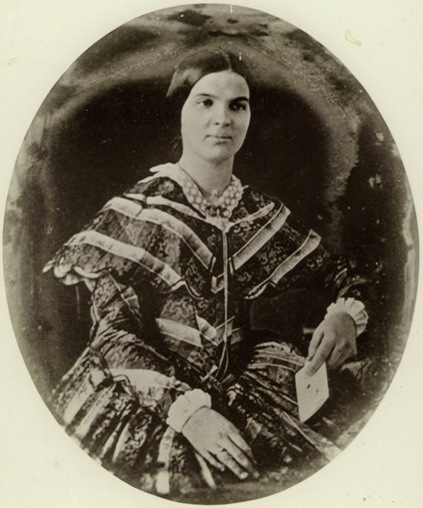
- Born: Susan Shelby; 30 July 1827; Danville, Kentucky
- Died: 26 October 1855 (aged 28); St. Louis, Missouri
- Known for: Down the Santa Fe Trail and into Mexico: the diary of Susan Shelby

Susan Shelby Magoffin (30 July 1827 – 26 October 1855) was the wife of a trader from the United States who traveled on the Santa Fe Trail in the late 1840s. The diary in which she recorded her experiences has been used extensively as a source for histories of the time.

== Biography ==
Susan Shelby was born into a wealthy family on 30 July 1827 on their plantation near Danville, Kentucky. Her grandfather was Isaac Shelby, a hero of the American Revolutionary War and the first governor of Kentucky. On 25 November 1845, when aged eighteen, she married Samuel Magoffin. Samuel was the son of an Irish immigrant who had prospered in Kentucky. Samuel and his brother James Wiley Magoffin had been active in the Santa Fe trade since the 1820s, travelling widely in the United States and Mexico and gaining considerable wealth. James became U.S. consul at Saltillo in 1828 and married the daughter of a prominent Chihuahua merchant in 1830.

Samuel Magoffin took his bride with him, travelling in as much comfort as possible, on the next trading journey, leaving Independence, Missouri on 10 June 1846. According to Susan Magoffin, their outfit included "fourteen big wagons with six yoke each, one baggage wagon with two yoke, one dearborn with two mules (this concern carries my maid) our own carriage with two more mules, and two men on mules driving the loose stock." They brought a maid, a cook and a coop of live chickens with them. Susan thought she was the first "American lady" to have made the trip.

On 31 July 1846 Susan Magoffin suffered a miscarriage at Bent's Fort, just after her nineteenth birthday. The Magoffins reached Santa Fe, New Mexico on 31 August 1846. From there, they headed south to El Paso del Norte, Chihuahua and Saltillo. Susan's health began to suffer from the hardships of the journey. While sick with yellow fever in Matamoros, Chihuahua, Susan Magoffin gave birth to a son, who did not survive. The Magoffins returned to Kentucky in 1848, where a daughter was born in 1851. In 1852 they moved to Barrett's Station, near to Kirkwood, Missouri, where Samuel bought a large estate. Susan's health had been irreparably damaged by the hardships of the Santa Fe expedition. A second daughter was born in 1855. Susan died soon after, on 26 October 1855, and was buried in St. Louis, Missouri.

Susan Magoffin shared the common Anglo-American prejudices of the time about Native Americans and Mexicans, at first assuming they were primitive and brutish, but was quick to adapt her views as she came to know them better. Thus she was astonished that an Indian woman who gave birth to a healthy child then went to the river half an hour later to bathe herself and her baby, and repeated this practice each day. She said "No doubt many ladies in civilized life are ruined by too careful treatments during childbirth, for this custom of the hethen is not known to be disadvantageous, but it is a 'hethenish custom.'" She said, "I did think the Mexicans were as void of refinement, judgement etc. as the dumb animals till I heard one of them say 'bonita muchachita' [pretty little girl]! And now I have reason and certainly a good one for changing my opinion; they are certainly a very quick and intelligent people." When she reached El Paso del Norte, Susan was greatly impressed with the civilized manners and learning of her Mexican hosts.

== Journal ==
Susan Magoffin's journal covers the journey from its start until 8 September 1847. The Magoffins traveled along the Santa Fe trail and down into Mexico in the wake of the invading United States army during the Mexican–American War (1846–1848). It is an invaluable source of information on the conditions of the time, the people and the events, often providing a unique woman's perspective.

=== Across the plains ===
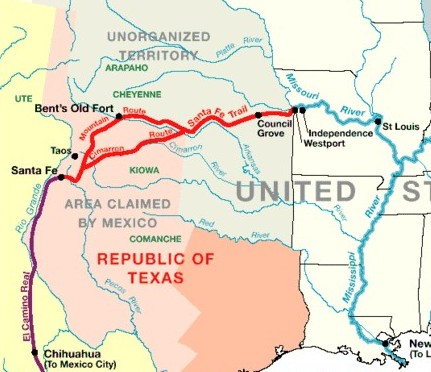
Santa Fe Trail

The journey took the Magoffins due west from Independence, Missouri, across the prairies of what is now Kansas, where she observed many migrating buffaloes. She recorded, "Such soup as we have made of the hump ribs, one of the most choice parts of the buffalo. I never eat its equal in the best hotels of N.Y. and Philad^{a}. And the sweetest butter and most delicate oil I ever tasted tis not surpassed by the marrow taken from the thigh bones." By 13 July some of the novelty had worn off. She wrote, "Passed a great many buffalo, (some thousands) they crossed our road frequently within two or three hundred yards. They are very ugly, ill-shapen things with their long shaggy hair over their heads, and the great hump on their backs, and they look so droll running." She witnessed a burial on the plains, and was impressed by the great pains taken to protect the body from wolves with a deep grave covered in stones and the earth tamped down by cattle. Their carriage rolled over on 4 July, and on the 21st their tent collapsed in a violent storm.

=== Bent's fort and Santa Fe ===
Susan became ill, and when they reached Bent's Fort on 27 July she took to bed in the spacious private rooms that they had reserved. The "Army of the West" was at the fort when the Magoffins arrived, ready to launch their invasion south into New Mexico. Shortly after her nineteenth birthday she suffered a miscarriage, which forced them to delay their onward journey. Leaving Bent's Fort on 14 August 1846, they reached the Mexican settlement at Mora creek on 25 August, where Susan was shocked at the primitive housing, and the next day came to Las Vegas, New Mexico. They continued south to Santa Fe, which they reached on 31 August.

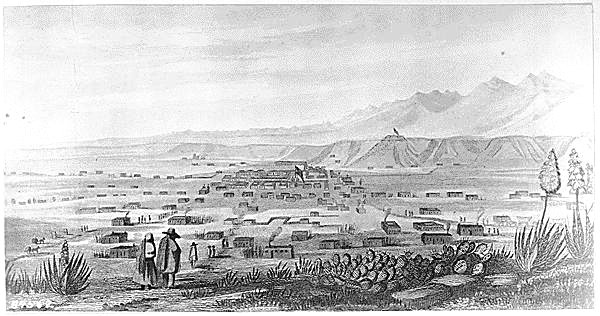
Santa Fe in 1846

The army under General Stephen W. Kearny had entered Santa Fe on 15 August 1846 without opposition, since the Mexican governor Manuel Armijo had told his soldiers not to fight. Susan's brother-in-law James Magoffin, who had been sent to parley with Armijo by Kearny, may have bribed Armijo to prevent resistance. In Santa Fe the Magoffins became part of the "high society" of the town, mingling with wealthy traders, army officers and the elite of the Hispanic society. She described Doña Gertrudes Barcelo as "the principal monte-bank (Note: Monte Bank is a Spanish gambling card games. It was one of the main forms of entertainment in Santa Fe at the time.) keeper in Santa Fé, a stately dame of a certain age, the possessor of a portion of that shrewd sense and fascinating manner necessary to allure the wayward, inexperienced youth to the hall of final ruin."

Visitors to Bent's Fort today can visit Susan's Room located on the upper level in the Northeast corner of the building. It is a recreation of how the room may have appeared with period correct furnishings.

=== South into Mexico ===
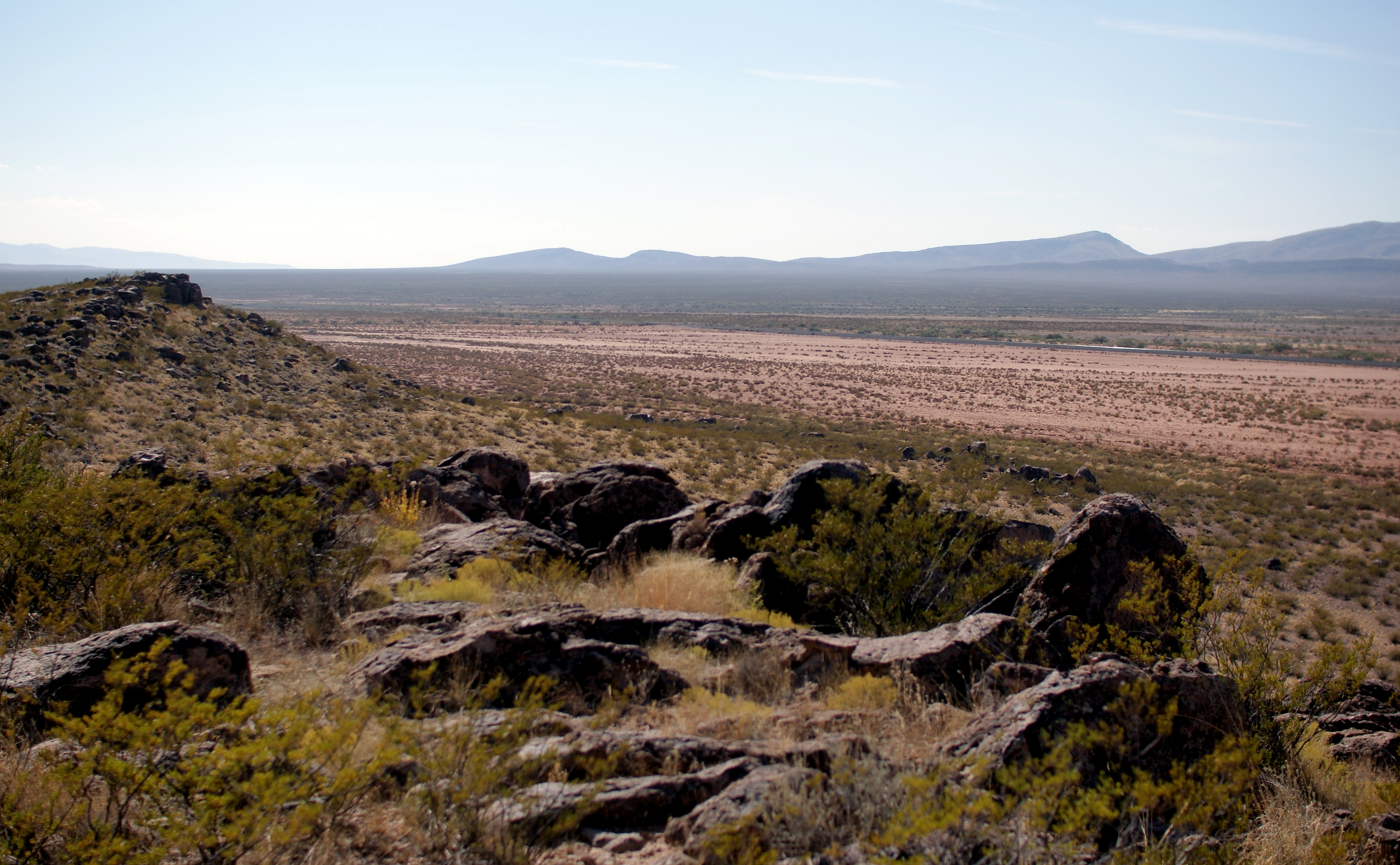
El Camino Real de Tierra Adentro

The Magoffins left for the south on 7 October 1846, ten days after the army. Travelling along El Camino Real de Tierra Adentro, the main route south, they encountered Pueblo Indians, the main farming people of New Mexico. Susan found that they would pay twice as much for empty glass bottles than would be charged for the full bottles in the United States. They spent some time at San Gabriel, where Susan fell ill for a while with a fever. A lady there taught her to make tortillas, which she found to take much more work than she expected, and also showed her knitting techniques. Leaving there towards the end of January 1847 they traveled south through the Jornada del Muerto to Doña Ana. The Taos rebellion had broken out, so they were in fear of attack by Mexicans in addition to the danger of the desert crossing.

At El Paso del Norte on 17 February 1847 they lodged at the house of the priest Ramón Ortiz y Miera, a spacious house surrounded by orchards and vineyards. A fierce nationalist, father Ortiz had been taken prisoner by Colonel Doniphan for encouraging armed resistance to the U.S. army. However, he was known for his hospitality to visitors. She was struck by the civilized atmosphere of the house, and particularly taken with a little girl who, "...only six years of age, carries with her the dignity of our girls of eighteen. It attracted my attention particularly the evening I came, with the same ease of a lady much accustomed to society, she entered the room, with a polite bow and 'Bonus tardes', (Note: Bonus tardes: Buenos tardes - Good evening.) shook hands with me and seated herself."

The Magoffins continued south in the wake of Colonel Doniphan's army, with Susan's health deteriorating due to the rigors of travel. Her journal ends on 8 September 1847.

== Television dramatization ==
The actress Linda Marsh was cast as the historical Susan Shelby Magoffin in the 1965 episode, "No Place for a Lady", on the syndicated television anthology series, Death Valley Days. Simon Scott played Magoffin's husband, Samuel, and host Ronald W. Reagan was cast as frontiersman William Bent.

== Bibliography ==
- Magoffin, Susan Shelby; Drumm, Stella Madeleine (1982-08-01). Down the Santa Fe Trail and Into Mexico: The Diary of Susan Shelby Magoffin, 1846–1847. U of Nebraska Press. ISBN 978-0-8032-8116-5.
