= Army of the West =

Army of the West may refer to:

- Army of the West (1793), a French Revolutionary unit during the French Revolutionary Wars
- Army of the West (1846), a United States army during the Mexican-American War
- Army of the West (1862), a Confederate States army during the American Civil War
- Army of Mississippi, also known as Army of the West, Confederate States army during the American Civil War
- Army of the West (Union Army), an 1861 Union Army, during the American Civil War led by Brigadier General Nathaniel Lyon.
- Army of the West (Middle Earth), army led by Aragorn
