= Donaciano Vigil =

Governor of New Mexico Territory (1802–1877)

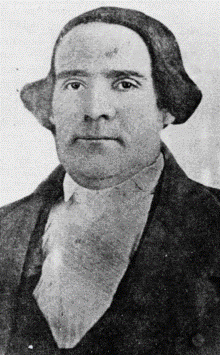

Governor of New Mexico
- In office January 1847 – October 11, 1848
- Preceded by: Charles Bent; Pablo Montoya (Santa Fe de Nuevo México)
- Succeeded by: John M. Washington

Personal details
- Born: 1802 Santa Fe, Nuevo México, New Spain
- Died: 1877 (aged 74–75) Santa Fe, New Mexico Territory, U.S.

Military service
- Allegiance: (Mexico) Mexican Empire; Mexican Republic
- Branch/service: Militia
- Years of service: 1823–1848
- Rank: Captain
- Battles/wars: Mexican Indian Wars • Chimayó Rebellion; Texan Santa Fe Expedition; Mexican-American War

Donaciano Vigil (1802–1877) was an American politician who served as the second governor of the New Mexico Territory. Born a subject of the Spanish Crown in Santa Fe to Hispano parents, he served in the militias during Mexican rule in New Mexico. After the United States annexed New Mexico following the Mexican–American War, Vigil helped smooth the transition to American governance.

== Early years (1802-1846) ==
Donaciano Vigil was born in 1802 in Santa Fe, New Mexico, and was educated by his father. When fully grown, Vigil was perhaps 6'2" tall, and very strong. He enlisted in the Santa Fe militia in 1823 as a private. During his twenty-five years of service, he participated in many campaigns against the Native Americans, helped suppress the revolt of 1837 against Governor Albino Pérez, and in 1841 fought against the Texan Santa Fe Expedition, a group of soldiers and traders from the Republic of Texas pushing through New Mexico towards Santa Fe. Vigil advanced through the ranks, becoming a captain and Company Commander of the San Miguel del Bado militia.

Vigil was intelligent, educated and fluent in English as well as Spanish. He twice served as a member of the Department Assembly, from 1838 to 1840 and again from 1843 to 1845. He also served as secretary to Governor Manuel Armijo. For a year from February 1844, he published a newspaper, La Verdad [The Truth]. He was involved in the Santa Fe trade with the United States, and came to know many Americans. In 1846 Vigil and his company mobilized to resist the United States army that invaded New Mexico under General Stephen W. Kearny, taking a position in Apache Canyon to prevent the U.S. troops from reaching the capital. However, Governor Manuel Armijo ordered the troops to disband rather than fight, and Vigil obeyed under protest. Kearny was able to occupy Santa Fe and New Mexico without resistance.

== Post-war leader (1846-1851) ==
Kearny wanted capable local leaders to assist in government, thereby smoothing the transition to United States rule. He offered Vigil the position of Secretary of the Territorial Civil Government under Governor Charles Bent. Vigil previously held the position of Territorial Secretary under Governor Armijo. By accepting this offer, Vigil threw in his lot with the United States. He apparently considered the more progressive government of the U.S. to be preferable to the ineffective and corrupt government based in Mexico City, which he criticized in his 1846 book Arms, Indians and Mismanagement of New Mexico.

In secret meetings led by Don Diego Archuleta at a home near the military church, La Castrenza, in Santa Fe, Mexican loyalists elected Tomas Ortiz governor with Archuleta as commanding general. A rebellion was planned to take place in the city on December 19, 1846, and later postponed to Christmas Eve. Mexican loyalist emissaries were sent out to all nearest points demanding that the people take part in the uprising in Santa Fe upon the third bell for midnight mass (Misa del Gallo), when all of the American officers would be captured. This plan fell through, however, after it became known to Donaciano Vigil, by way of the proprietress of the city's largest gambling house, Tules Barcelona. Vigil informed General Sterling Price, of the Second Missouri Mounted Volunteers, who had a number of conspirators arrested. With the information obtained, General Price was able to station soldiers at the homes of every known revolutionist. However, Tomas Ortiz escaped in the garb of a servant girl and fled to Chihuahua.

The new governor, Charles Bent, was a prosperous fur trader who hailed from Virginia. By 1835, Bent settled in Taos and married a local woman, María Ignacia Jaramillo. On 19 January 1847, Bent was murdered by a group of Hispanic and Taos Pueblo rebels at the beginning of the Taos Revolt.

Afterwards, General Price asked Vigil to serve as Acting Governor. Vigil accepted the position, calling on the people to be calm. He said, "... whether this country has to belong to the government of the United States or return to its native Mexico, is it not a gross absurdity to foment rancorous feelings toward people with whom we are either to compose one family or to continue our commercial relations? Unquestionably it is ..."

Vigil's proclamation ended,

The term of my administration is purely transitory. Neither my qualifications nor the ad interim character, according to the organic law in which I take the reins of government, encourage me to continue in so difficult and thorny a post, the duties of which are intended for individuals of greater enterprise and talents; but I protest to you, in the utmost fervor of my heart that I will devote myself exclusively to endeavouring to secure you all the prosperity so much desired by your fellow-citizen and friend. Donaciano Vigil. January 22, 1847.

As Acting Governor, Vigil called for the establishment of a public school system open to the poor as well as the rich. Later in 1847, he called for the first Territorial legislature to be convened. Vigil was appointed Governor in December 1847. He supported the territorial legislature's resolution calling for the creation of a public university. In 1848, he endorsed the legislature's request for a territorial convention to determine the formal status of New Mexico. That is, as either a state or a territory of the United States. On 10 October 1848, Colonel John M. Washington arrived in Santa Fe at the head of four dragoon companies. The next day Washington took charge as both civil and military governor. Vigil reverted to his former position as Territorial Secretary. He held that post until March 1851 when the new constitution took effect and the government of New Mexico was reorganized.

In April 1849 Father Ramón Ortiz y Miera arrived in New Mexico from Chihuahua, Mexico as commissioner in charge of assisting Mexicans who wished to resettle in Chihuahua. He was welcomed by Governor Washington and Secretary Vigil who both thought he was unlikely to succeed. So, they even offered to supply transport to Mexicans seeking repatriation. Their moods changed quickly when the people of San Miguel del Vado, alone, submitted 900 requests for repatriation assistance. Vigil said that Ortíz could not conduct recruitment in person since his presence would disturb the peace. Father Ortiz then appointed agents to recruit New Mexico families for repatriation and was still met with considerable success. In response, Vigil cracked down further on recruitment efforts. The United States position was that the treaty of Guadalupe Hidalgo did not cover repatriation. As such, Ortíz's activity was therefore illegal.

== Landowner (1851-1877) ==
Donaciano Vigil had been involved in land purchases for some time. He moved to Pecos in 1854, where he became a major landowner, founding East Pecos. In 1830 the Pueblo Indians of the area had sold part of their lands to Juan Estavan Pino, and Vigil obtained the part of Pino's purchase that lay to the east of the Pecos River. His first purchase of land in the Pecos Pueblo tract was made on 26 December 1854, for a price of $1,500, and further purchases followed over the years. He built houses and storage rooms, and an irrigation ditch to power his grain mill. Vigil continued to be active in public affairs, serving in the territorial legislature several times up to the end of the American Civil War. He was a school commissioner in San Miguel County from 1871 to 1872. A strong old man, at the age of 74 he was still capable of riding a horse from Pecos to Santa Fe, a distance of 25 miles (40 km). He died in 1877, leaving a will that divided his land among his numerous sons.

== See also ==
- Donaciano Vigil House

== Bibliography ==
- Vigil, Donaciano; Weber, David J. (1986). Arms, Indians, and the mismanagement of New Mexico. First published 1846. University of Texas at El Paso: Texas Western Press. ISBN 0874041562.

== Sources ==
- Hall, G. Emlen (1984). Four Leagues of Pecos: A Legal History of the Pecos Grant, 1800-1933. UNM Press. ISBN 978-0-8263-0710-1.
- Hernández, José Angel (2012-04-30). Mexican American Colonization During the Nineteenth Century: A History of the U.S.-Mexico Borderlands. Cambridge University Press. ISBN 978-1-107-01239-4.
- MacIel, David; Gonzales-Berry, Erlinda (2000-09-01). The Contested Homeland: A Chicano History of New Mexico. UNM Press. ISBN 978-0-8263-2199-2.
- Simmons, Marc (November 25, 2011). "Colonel left little mark as governorTrail Dust". The New Mexican.
- Twitchell, Ralph Emerson (1909). The History of the Military Occupation of the Territory of New Mexico. Arno Press. ISBN 0405095287.
- Vigil, Maurilio E. (2012). "Vigil, Donaciano". Archived from the original on April 25, 2011.
- Weber, David J. (2003-12-01). Foreigners in Their Native Land: Historical Roots of the Mexican Americans. UNM Press. ISBN 978-0-8263-3510-4.
- Weber, David J. (2012). "Vigil, Donaciano". New Mexico State Record Center and Archives.
- Wroth, William H. (2012). "Bent, Charles". New Mexico State Record Center and Archives. Archived from the original on 2012-03-09.

Political offices
Preceded by Charles Bent	Governor of New Mexico; 1847–1848	Succeeded by John M. Washington
