= Battle of Canada (disambiguation) =

The Battle of Canada may refer to:

== Military Conflicts ==
- The Battle of Cañada, an insurrection against the American occupation of New Mexico by Mexicans and Puebloans in 1847.
- The French and Indian War, the North American theatre of the Seven Years' War between the British Empire, the Kingdom of France, and their allies.
- The Invasion of Quebec (1775), the American Invasion of the British Province of Quebec during the American Revolutionary War.
- The War of 1812, a war between British North America and the United States from 1812 to 1815.

== Sports ==
- The Battle of Canada, a Canadian soccer rivalry between FC Edmonton and Ottawa Fury FC.
