= Diego Archuleta =

New Mexico military officer (1814–1884)

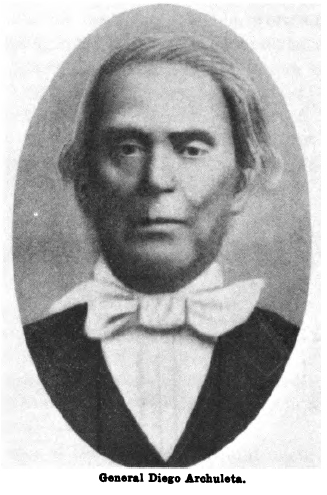

Member of the Congress of the Union of the United Mexican States
- In office 1843–1845
- Constituency: Santa Fe de Nuevo México

Personal details
- Born: March 27, 1814 Plaza de Los Luceros, Viceroyalty of New Spain (now Rio Arriba County, New Mexico, U.S.)
- Died: March 21, 1884 (aged 69) Santa Fe, New Mexico, U.S.

Military service
- Allegiance: Mexico; United States
- Branch/service: Mexican Army; New Mexico Militia
- Years of service: 1846–1848 (Mexico); 1862–1865 (USA)
- Rank: Colonel (Mexico); Brigadier General (U.S Militia)
- Unit: 1st Infantry Regiment, New Mexico Militia
- Commands: 1st Division, New Mexico Militia
- Battles/wars: Mexico–Texas Conflicts; Texan Santa Fe Expedition; Mexican–American War; Capture of Santa Fe; Battle of Cañada; American Civil War; Battle of Valverde

Brigadier General Diego Archuleta (March 27, 1814 – March 21, 1884), was a member of the Mexican Congress. He joined the Mexican Army to fight against the United States in the Mexican–American War. Later, he was appointed an Indian (Native Americans) Agent by President Abraham Lincoln, and joined the Union Army (US Army) during the American Civil War. Archuleta became the first Hispanic to reach the military rank of Brigadier General.

== Early years ==
Archuleta was born in Plaza de Los Luceros, Rio Arriba, New Mexico, then a province of New Spain. He was the son of a prominent citizen, Juan Andres Archuleta. His family were wealthy ranchers and, as such, they had the economic means to send him to Durango, Mexico where he received his primary and secondary education. His education was intended to prepare him for the priesthood, toward which he attained the four minor orders, but he decided not to follow that vocation before leaving Durango.

== Pre-war Mexican service and life ==
Archuleta returned home in 1840 and was commissioned as captain of the militia. In this capacity, he commanded a body of troops and assisted in the capture of Texans during the Texan Santa Fe Expedition of 1841. In that year he also married Jesusita Trujillo, who later gave him seven children. In 1843 he was elected as a Deputy from New Mexico to the National Mexican Congress, serving there for two years. In recognition of his distinguished service as an officer of the Mexican army he was awarded the golden Cross of Honor for preserving the integrity of the Mexican territory.

== Mexican-American War ==
Archuleta supported Mexico upon the outbreak of the Mexican–American War. The Mexican–American War was an armed conflict between the United States and Mexico from 1846 to 1848 in the wake of the 1845 U.S. annexation of Texas, which Mexico considered part of its territory despite the 1836 Texas Revolution. In 1846 and 1847, Archuleta participated and led two unsuccessful rebellions against the U.S.

On August 9, 1846, Archuleta, who was appointed to the rank of Colonel in the Mexican Army, wanted to fight the invading American forces headed towards Santa Fe. He was joined by other militia officers was joined by other militia officers Manuel Chaves and Miguel Pino, who wanted Governor Manuel Armijo to muster a defense. Armijo set up a position in Apache Canyon, a narrow pass about 10 miles (16 km) southeast of the city. On August 14, before the arrival of the American Army, Armijo decided not to fight and dismissed Archuleta. No shots were fired in the Capture of Santa Fe and the New Mexican Militia retreated from Santa Fe while Armijo fled to Chihuahua.

An account by Senator Thomas H. Benton states that at least twenty-four hours before Kearny reached Apache Canyon, James Magoffin had convinced (possibly with a bribe) Manuel Armijo to make no defense, but Colonel Archuleta, second in command, was determined to fight. In order to dissuade Archuleta, Magoffin argued that Kearny was only interested in lands east of the Rio Grande which were previously claimed by Texas, and recommended that Archuleta issue a pronunciamento to seize territory west of the river for his own governance. Whereby, Archuleta agreed not to resist.

Following the Capture of Santa Fe and the discovery that U.S. military orders were to take possession of the whole territory and that General Kearny was marching toward California, Archuleta was determined to revolt. He organized the first conspiracy to overthrow General Sterling Price's government administration in Santa Fe, but the plot was discovered and stopped. Within another thirty days he had organized another conspiracy, which resulted in the death of Governor Charles Bent and others. This was the Taos Revolt, a popular insurrection against the American occupation of New Mexico by Mexicans and Pueblo Indians. Archuleta also participated in the January 24, 1847 Battle of Cañada, which was part of that revolt.

== New Mexico Territorial Government ==
The U.S. won the Mexican–American War and forced Mexico into the cession of its northern territories, which included New Mexico. After the war, Archuleta returned to New Mexico and swore allegiance to the American government. He became involved in the territorial politics and was elected to the New Mexico Territorial Legislative Assembly a dozen times over a period of 31 years. He represented Rio Arriba County, serving in the House of Representatives during the 3rd, 4th, 6th, and 12th legislative sessions. In 1863 he moved to the upper house, the Council, and served as its President in the 13th and 14th sessions. He returned to the Council for the 17th through 20th and 23rd sessions. Finally, he was elected one last time to the House for the 26th session. During the session he fell ill and died on March 21, 1884.

He also ran as a candidate for the 1861 Thirty-seventh Congress of the United States, but was defeated by John Sebrie Watts. Watts had also advocated for Archuleta's appointment as the U.S. Indian agent. In 1857 Archuleta was named the U.S. Indian agent for the Ute tribe. In one of his government reports he is listed as agent for the Utahs, Capotes, and Apache Jicarillas. In March 1865, after the war's end, President Lincoln re-appointed Archuleta as an Indian agent in New Mexico.

== American Civil War ==
In 1861, eleven southern slave states of the United States of America declared their secession from the U.S. and formed the Confederate States of America. The U.S. government (The Union) rejected secession as illegal and the Civil War ensued.

Initially, Archuleta's sympathies lay with the Confederates. This led Watts and other pro-Union colleagues to lose faith in Archuleta. In 1861, Watts asked president Abraham Lincoln to replace Archuleta and to name Jose Antonio Mansinares to the position of Indian agent.

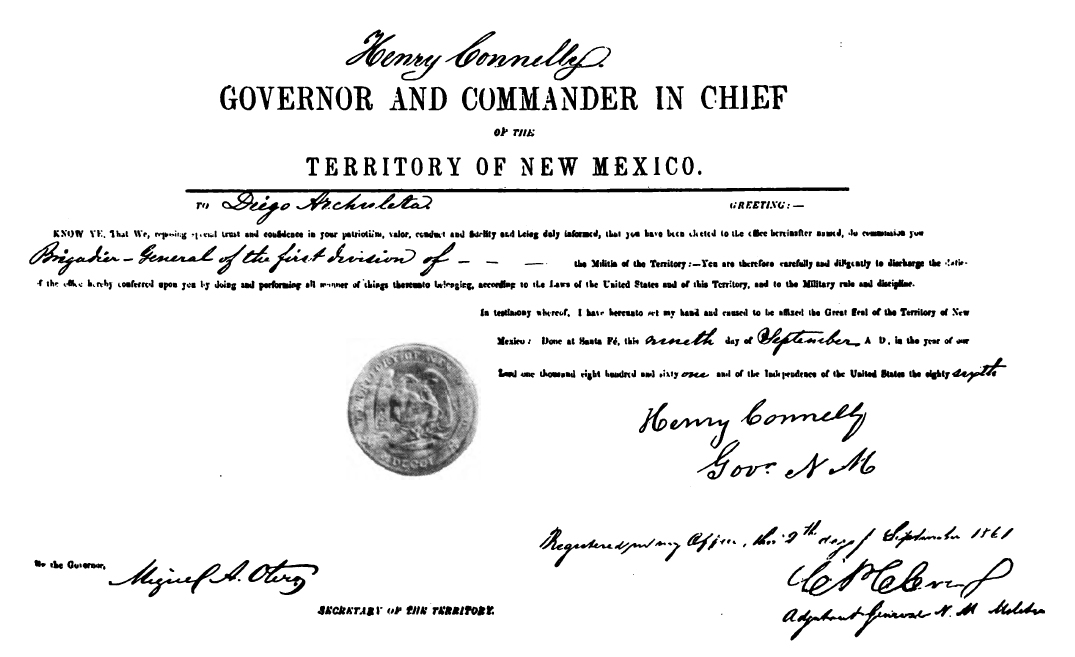
Diego Archuleta's appointment to Brigadier General of the 1st Division of the Territory of New Mexico Militia by Governor Henry Connelly, Sep 9, 1861

Archuleta later recanted his secessionist views and joined the Union Army. He was assigned to the "New Mexico Militia" (NMM) as Lt. Colonel with Colonel Manuel Armijo (son of the late governor Manuel Armijo), over the 1st regiment, consisting of six companies. The smaller 2nd regiment of the NMM consisted of four companies and was under the command of Colonel Nicolas Pino, Lt. Colonel J. M. Baca y Salazar and Major Charles E. Wesche. On September 9, 1861 he was appointed as Brigadier General of the 1st division of the Militia of the Territory by Henry Connelly, governor and commander in chief of the territory. The "New Mexico Volunteer Infantry" (NMVI) had the most Hispanic officers of any unit in the Union Army. The unit included Colonel Miguel E. Pino, Lieutenant Colonel Jose Maria Valdez, Colonel Jose G. Gallegos, and Lieutenant Colonel Francisco Perea. These units fought in the Battle of Valverde on February 21, 1862. When Archuleta was promoted to Brigadier General, he became the first Hispanic in history to reach that rank in the United States Military.

== Death ==
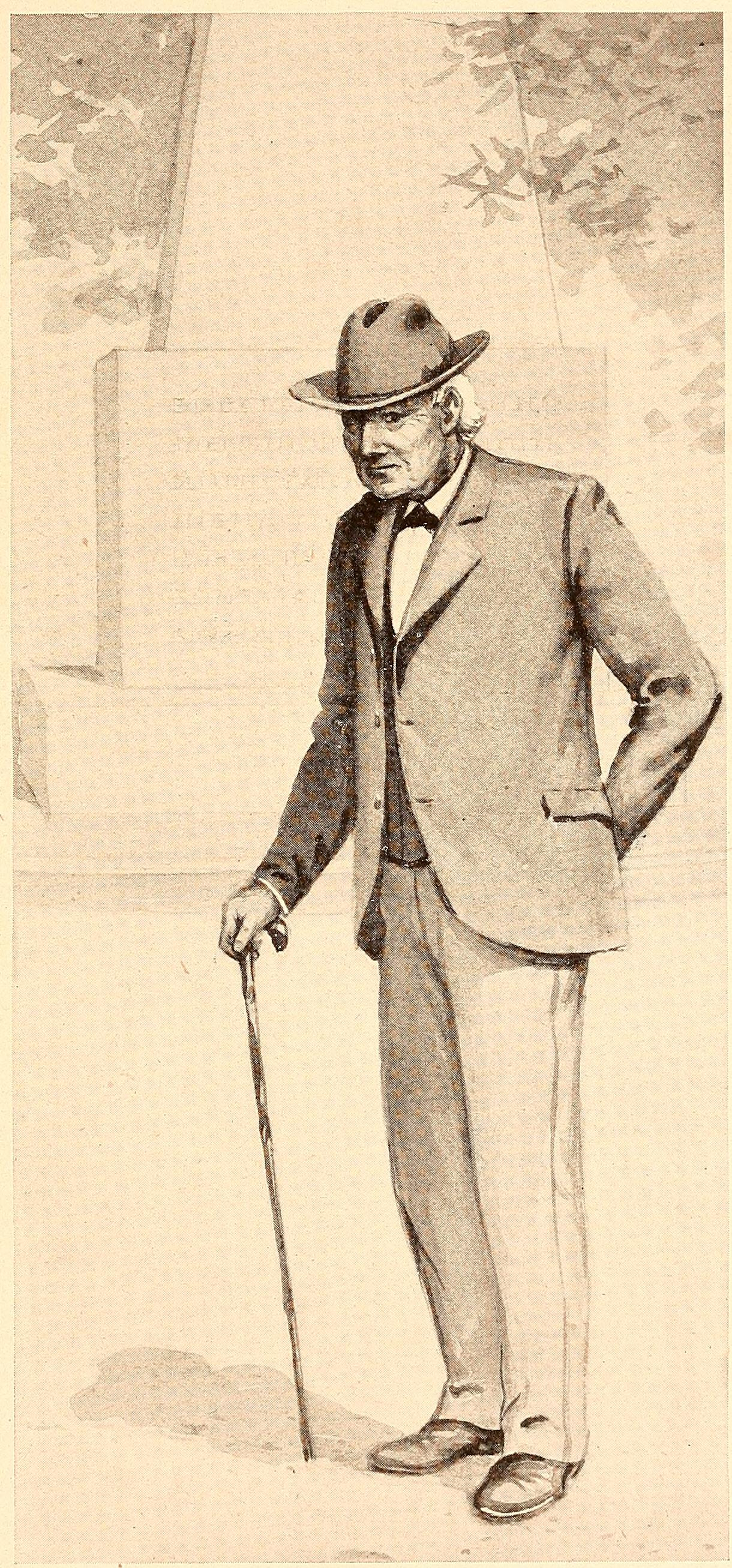

On March 20, 1884, during his last session of the Assembly, he was taken suddenly ill. The following day he was assisted to his seat, cast his vote, and was then taken to his apartments, and although every known medical treatment was brought to bear, he died of heart failure. On the day of the funeral native and American citizens alike assembled in vast numbers, performing the last honor to the distinguished statesman. The procession which followed the remains to their last resting place in the Catholic cemetery was one of the largest ever seen in the City of Santa Fe. The 22d Infantry Band of the United States Army led the procession, which included the General commanding the District, Brigadier General David S. Stanley, his staff, and other officers of the U.S. Army stationed at Santa Fe, the members of the legislative assembly, the county commissioners, secret and patriotic societies. It was estimated that over 2,500 people marched in the procession.

His last speech in the House of Representatives was in favor of an amendment to a pending educational bill, which declared for non-sectarian administration of the schools of New Mexico. In making this speech, he said that he was then an old man, that he expected very soon to be called to his Maker, and when that time came, he would go with the satisfaction of knowing that his vote had been cast in behalf of freedom and in behalf of free, non-sectarian education of the youth of his country. His last vote cast in the House was in favor of the construction of the Capitol building at Santa Fe. He died in Santa Fe, and was survived by seven children.

== Awards and decorations ==
Diego Archuleta's awards and decorations include the following:

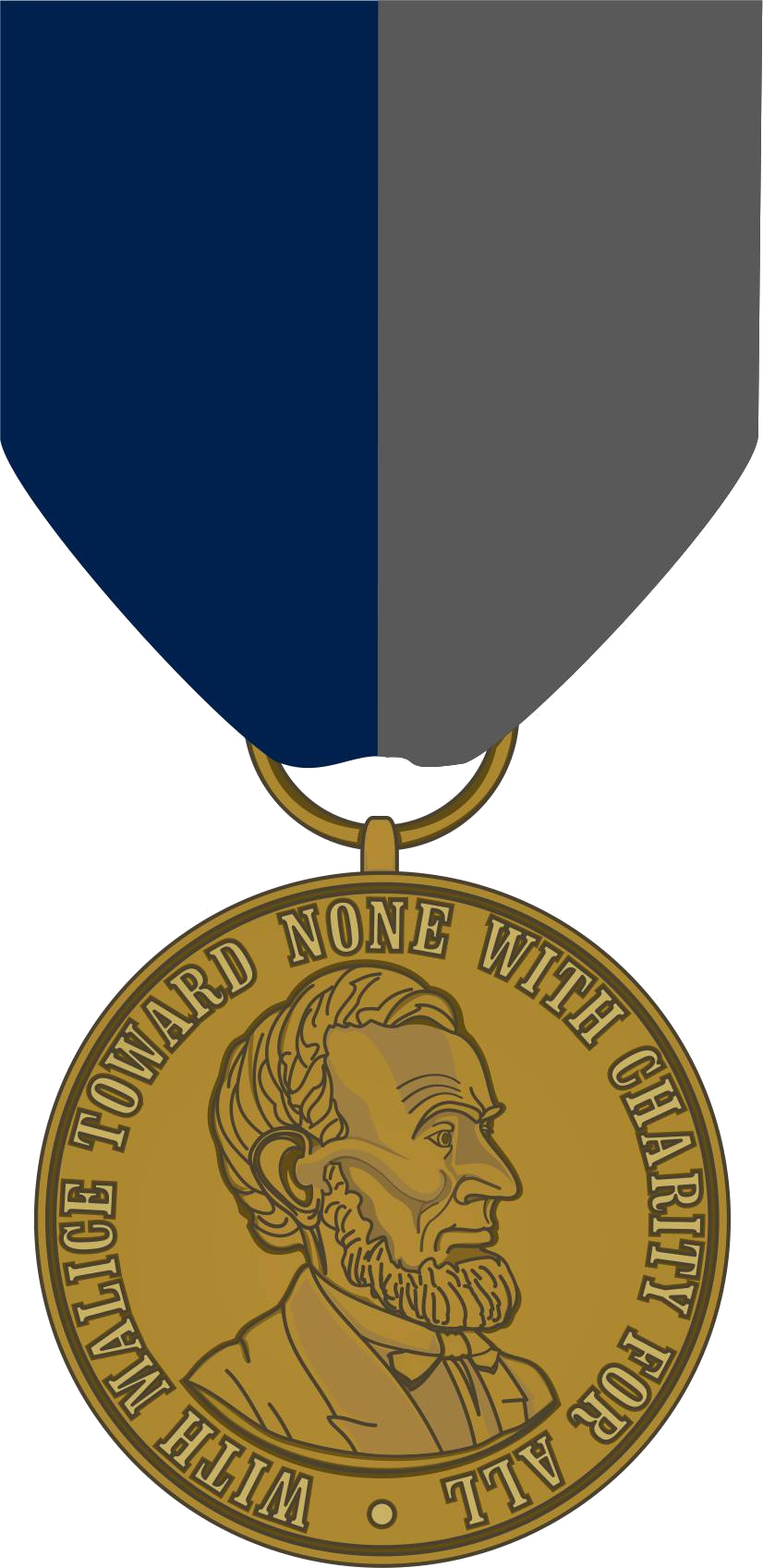
Army Civil War Campaign Medal

== See also ==
- Hispanics in the American Civil War
- Capture of Santa Fe
- Battle of Cañada
- Manuel Armijo
