= 26th New Mexico Territorial Legislature =

The 26th New Mexico Territorial Legislature met in Santa Fe from February 18, 1884, to April 3, 1884.

== Territorial Council ==
- President: Jose Armijo y Vigil

Name	District
Jose Armijo y Vigil	Socorro
Thomas B. Catron	Santa Fe
Jose Pablo Gallegos	Rio Arriba
W.H. Keller	San Miguel
Charles C. McComas	Bernalillo
John A. Miller	Doña Ana, Lincoln and Grant
José Manuel Montoya	Bernalillo
Andres Sena	San Miguel
José Inocencio Valdez	Colfax and Mora

== House of Representatives ==
- Speaker: Amado Chaves

Name	District
Diego Archuleta	Rio Arriba
Marcos Cabeza de Baca	Bernalillo
Alexander L. Branch	Mora
Amado Chaves	Valencia
Rafael Chaves	Bernalillo
Teofilo Chavez	Valencia
Michael Cooney	Socorro
Edward E. Furman	Grant
Juan Gallegos	San Miguel
Macario Gallegos	Mora
Nicholas Galles	Doña Ana and Lincoln
Florencio Gonzales	Doña Ana and Lincoln
Juan N. Jaquez	Rio Arriba
John L. Jenks	Santa Fe
Dionicio Martinez	San Miguel
R.E. McFarland	Socorro
Oscar P. McManes	Colfax
Theodore B. Mills	San Miguel
José Romulo Salazar	Valencia
Atanacio Sanchez	San Miguel
Santiago Valdez	Taos
Librado Valencia	Santa Fe
Nicanor Vigil	Taos
William H. Whiteman	Bernalillo

== Contested organization ==
Due to a disputed election in Bernalillo County, the membership and organization of both houses was contested. The district court found that a large number of fraudulent votes had been cast and issued a judgment with respect to county officials, rejecting those who appeared to have won based on the election returns, and awarding the victory to their opponents. When the Legislative Assembly gathered, longtime Territorial Secretary William G. Ritch attempted to organize the houses along the same lines, but ran into questions due to the assumption that each house had the final authority to assess whether its members were duly elected and qualified.

In the Council, when Ritch refused to swear in the nominally elected Bernalillo members, a group walked out and organized themselves under the leadership of veteran legislator José Francisco Chaves from Valencia County. Other members of this group included Anthony Joseph, Henry H. Whitehill, and Charles Montaldo; Montaldo was one of the leaders of the Bernalillo party. Since the Santa Fe council seat was also contested, and some members whose election was not in dispute joined the Chaves group, before accepting replacements Ritch did not have a quorum as his group had 5 uncontested members (Armijo y Vigil, Gallegos, Keller, Miller, and Sena) out of 12 seats. While they promptly voted to recognize Catron, McComas, and Montoya, Valdez did not arrive until very late in the session (March 26), so the Council remained short of its full complement throughout and lacking representation from Valencia and Taos.

By contrast in the House, Ritch was able to swear in the representatives whose election was undisputed, and then proceeded to have them decide on the Bernalillo members. A quorum voted to accept Baca, Rafael Chaves, and Whiteman over those claiming to have been elected (Leo J. Barr, William B. Childers, and a Mr. Laughlin). The House then had to decide which of the Councils to recognize; at the urging of Ritch and Governor Lionel A. Sheldon, it refused the overtures of the Chaves group and aligned with the Ritch group, leaving the legislature as constituted. Alexander L. Branch, a leading spokesperson for the opposing faction, tried to exploit the irregularity of the Council's swearing in, but to no avail. To finally resolve the election contest, the House Committee on Elections offered the Bernalillo claimants an opportunity to present evidence for their position, but with the committee members having voted 2-1 in favor of those already seated, the rejected candidates declined to appear at the time appointed for a hearing.
