= Battle of Cañada =

Insurrection against the American occupation of New Mexico

Coordinates: 35.987°N 106.039°W

- Part of the Taos Revolt; Mexican–American War
- A page from Colonel Price's report showing troop movements.
Date	January 24, 1847
Location	Santa Cruz, New Mexico
Result	United States victory

Belligerents
United States	Mexico

Commanders and leaders
(United States) Sterling Price (WIA) (United States) Ceran St. Vrain	(Mexico) Thomas Ortiz (Mexico) Pablo Chavez (Mexico) Pablo Montoya (Mexico) Jesus Tafoya (Mexico) Diego Archuleta

Strength
353	1,500 to 2,000

Casualties and losses
2 killed 7 or 6 wounded	36 killed 45 captured or wounded

The Battle of Cañada was a popular insurrection against the American occupation of New Mexico by Mexicans and Pueblo Indians. It took place on January 24, 1847, during the Taos Revolt, a conflict of the Mexican–American War.

== Background ==
Insurgents, Mexicans and Pueblo Indians in New Mexico under the leadership of Chavez, Montoya, Tafoya and Ortiz, assembled a large force at La Canada, intending to march onto the American-held city of Santa Fe. They would be intercepted by the American garrison of Santa Fe, resulting in the battle.

Colonel Sterling Price, commander of the U.S. forces in Santa Fe, heard of this insurgent movement on 20 Jan., having intercepted letters from the rebels, and assembled a force of 353 soldiers and militia to march north on 23 Jan., and intercept them. Price's force included Capt. McMillin's Company D, Capt. Williams' Company K, Capt. Lack's Company L, Capt. Halley's Company M, and Capt. Barber's Company N, 2d Regiment Missouri Mounted Volunteers, Capt. Agney's battalion of infantry and Capt. St. Vrain's Santa Fe volunteers, and Lt. A.B. Dyer's four mounted howitzers, while Lt. Col. Willock remained behind in command of the capital.

== Battle ==
On 24 Jan., Price met the large insurgent force on the heights along the road to Santa Cruz de la Cañada and three strong houses at the base of the hill. Price placed his artillery on the left to fire on the houses and bluff, placed his dismounted men such that they were protected by the stream bluff, and sent Capt. St. Vrain to protect his wagon train a mile to the rear until it joined him. Price ordered Capt. Agney to dislodge the rebels occupying the house opposite his right flank, followed by a charge up the hill, supported by Lt. White and Capt. St. Vrain. Capt.s McMillen's, Barber's and Slack's men took possession of the houses enclosed by a strong corral. Price reported, "In a few minutes my troops had dislodged the enemy at all points, and they were flying in every direction."

== Aftermath ==
Tafoya was killed, Chavez was later killed at Taos Pueblo, and Montoya was later caught and hanged at Don Fernando (today's Town of Taos, NM). Price camped on the field that night while the rebels retreated to Taos. On 29 Jan., Price met the insurgents at the Battle of Embudo Pass.

== See also ==
- List of battles fought in New Mexico
- List of battles of the Mexican–American War
