= Capture of Santa Fe =

1846 bloodless engagement of the Mexican-American War

Coordinates: 35.69°N 105.94°W

- Part of the Mexican–American War
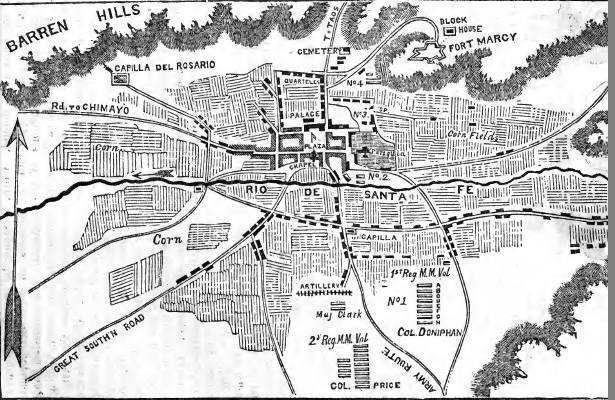
- Doniphan's map
| Date | August 15, 1846 |
| Location | Santa Fe, New Mexico |
| Result | American victory |

Belligerents
| United States | Mexico |

Commanders and leaders
| (United States) Stephen W. Kearny | (Mexico) Manuel Armijo |

Strength
| 1,700 | Unknown |

The capture of Santa Fe, also known as the Battle of Santa Fe or the Battle of Cañoncito, took place near Santa Fe, New Mexico, the capital of the Mexican Province of New Mexico, during the Mexican–American War on 8 August through 14 August 1846. No shots were fired during the capturing of Santa Fe.

== Background ==
United States Army General Stephen W. Kearny had moved southwest from Fort Leavenworth, Kansas with about 1,700 men in his Army of the West. Kearny's orders were to secure the New Mexico Territory and Alta California.

August 9 in Santa Fe, Governor Manuel Armijo wanted to avoid battle, but Catholic priests, Diego Archuleta (the young regular-army commander), and the young militia officers Manuel Chaves and Miguel Pino forced him to muster a defense. Armijo set up a position in Apache Canyon, a narrow pass about 10 miles (16 km) southeast of the city. However, on August 14, before the American army was even in view, he decided not to fight. (An American named James Magoffin claimed he had convinced Armijo and Archuleta to follow this course; an unverified story says he bribed Armijo.) When Pino, Chaves, and some of the militiamen insisted on fighting, Armijo ordered the cannon pointed at them. The New Mexican army retreated to Santa Fe, and Armijo fled to Chihuahua.

== Capture ==
Kearny and his troops encountered no Mexican forces when they arrived on August 15, after six straight weeks of marching through the desert. Kearny and his force entered Santa Fe and claimed the New Mexico Territory for the United States without a shot being fired. Upon confrontation by Mexican soldiers in Santa Fe, Kearny stated that he meant to withdraw and not push on into the city.

== Aftermath ==
From Santa Fe, Kearny sent Colonel Alexander Doniphan further south into Mexico. Kearny declared himself the military governor of the New Mexico Territory on August 18 and established a civilian government. He then took the remainder of his army west to Alta California.

The New Mexicans put up no organized resistance until the Taos Revolt in early 1847, although in the month prior, a December, 1846 planned revolt in Santa Fe, involving many leading Mexican loyalists, was discovered and disrupted by General Sterling Price, after being informed of the plot by Donaciano Vigil, before it could be carried out.

== See also ==
- List of battles of the Mexican–American War
- List of battles fought in New Mexico
- Taos Revolt – Insurrection in New Mexico Territory in 1847
