= Army of the West (1846) =

- Active: 1846–1848
- Country: United States
- Branch: Army
- Type: Field army
- Role: Frontier expedition and occupation
- Size: Approx. 1,600–3,000 men
- Garrison/HQ: Fort Leavenworth (initial assembly)
- Engagements: Mexican–American War: Capture of Santa Fe; Battle of San Pasqual; Battle of San Gabriel; Battle of La Mesa; Taos Revolt

Commanders
- Notable commanders: Stephen W. Kearny; Sterling Price; Alexander William Doniphan

The Army of the West was the name of the United States force commanded by Stephen W. Kearny during the Mexican–American War, which played a prominent role in the conquest of New Mexico and California. It was headquartered at Fort Leavenworth, Kansas. After the war, it was broken up into the Department of the Pacific and the Department of the West.

== New Mexico ==
Colonel Stephen W. Kearny initially commanded some 1,700 regular army and volunteer soldiers mustering at Fort Leavenworth, Kansas. Kearny was promoted to brigadier general, and he designated the force the Army of the West and advanced on the Santa Fe Trail by the end of June 1846. Other American forces followed including Colonel Sterling Price and the Second Missouri Mounted Volunteer Regiment and the famous Mormon Battalion, the only religious unit in American military history. Months later the 1st New York Volunteer Infantry and some regular army units arrived by ship in California. Kearny moved into present day New Mexico and seized Santa Fe, establishing a military government there. Kearny dispatched forces under Colonel Alexander Doniphan for further operations in New Mexico while Kearny with the remaining forces of the army proceeded overland towards California, guided by Kit Carson. Colonel Sterling Price was left in command of U.S. troops in New Mexico. The forces left behind in New Mexico were still regarded as part of Army of the West. Price was able to successfully put down the Taos Revolt in the early part of 1847. Eventually the Army of the West would have some 4,000–5,000 soldiers operating in California, New Mexico and also Doniphan's regiment and its expedition in Chihuahua.

== California ==
Believing that Californian resistance had ended, Kearny brought only one company of his troops from Santa Fe. When he moved into the northern (Alta) section of the Las Californias department of Mexico (the Baja California peninsula was included in the same department), however, he found a rebellion in progress. Kearny attacked a Californian force led by General Andrés Pico at the Battle of San Pasqual. Though the Californians were forced from the field, the attack was a costly one. General Kearny, himself wounded, required reinforcements from the garrison at San Diego to relieve his position and move the wounded to safety. Once in San Diego, Kearny's force was augmented with reinforcements of marines and naval infantry under Commodore Robert F. Stockton's command. With a combined force now numbering 500, Kearny and Stockton moved north to attack Pico's Californians near Los Angeles. U.S. forces took control of the city on January 10, 1847, after having won the battles of Rio San Gabriel and La Mesa. On January 13, the Californians surrendered to John C. Fremont, ending the major fighting in California. Kearny moved to Monterey and stayed on until May as military governor of California.

== Chihuahua ==
In late 1846, General Stephen W. Kearny began his march west to California. He left three companies of Dragoons to form, with volunteer troops, a strong garrison in New Mexico. Command of the garrison eventually was placed with Colonel Sterling Price. The last major action of the army came in 1848 when Price, recently promoted to the rank of general, invaded the state of Chihuahua and defeated a Mexican force at the Battle of Santa Cruz de Rosales. This battle occurred after a ceasefire and the Treaty of Guadalupe Hidalgo had been signed.

In 1862, Sterling Price would command another force named Army of the West, this time as part of the Confederate States Army during the American Civil War.

Order of battle at Santa Cruz de Rosales

- Commander – Brigadier General Sterling Price

Unit	Commander
3rd Missouri Mounted Regiment	Colonel John Ralls
Santa Fe Mounted Regiment	Major Robert Walker
1st U.S. Dragoons	Major Benjamin L. Beall
Love's Battery	Lieutenant John Love

== Major battles ==
- Battle of Santa Fe
- Battle of San Pasqual
- Battle of Rio San Gabriel
- Battle of La Mesa
- Taos Revolt
- Battle of Santa Cruz de Rosales

== See also ==
- Army of Occupation (Mexico)
- Bent's Old Fort National Historic Site
- Fort Marcy (New Mexico)
- John Strother Griffin, physician with this unit
