= Kearny Code =

Former legal code in occupied New Mexico

The Kearny Code is a legal code named after General Stephen W. Kearny. The Kearny Code was promulgated in present-day Santa Fe, New Mexico on September 22, 1846 for use in the new New Mexico Territory, as occupied by the United States Army on August 18 during the U.S.-Mexican War. General Kearny on September 26 left with guide Kit Carson to engage in the Alta California theater of the war.

== Origin ==
The code was printed on a Ramage press owned by Padre Antonio José Martínez known as the Cura de Taos, and prepared by Col. Alexander William Doniphan, of the 1st Regiment of Missouri Mounted Volunteers, receiving significant assistance from Lt. Willard Preble Hall of the same regiment. The code was based on the Bill of Rights and laws of Missouri, with emendations from the laws of Coahuila y Tejas, and the Livingston Code.

The Kearny Code became the basis of New Mexico law. It was submitted to Congress along with the Organic Act creating the Territory of New Mexico. It was amended by the territorial legislature, and after statehood by the state legislature, but many of its provisions remain substantially unchanged to this day.

== Provisions ==
The promulgation consisted of three parts, a Bill of Rights, a list of appointments to civil offices in the territory of New Mexico, and Laws for the Government of the Territory of New Mexico. The Bill of Rights did not distinguish between citizens and non-citizens, but granted rights to all persons. It contained most of the safeguards of the United States Bill of Rights and others from Missouri. The laws were mostly verbatim from a copy of the Missouri statutes that Private Hall, who was a Missouri attorney, had in his saddlebags.
