= Battle of El Brazito =

1846 battle of the Mexican-American War

- Part of the Mexican–American War
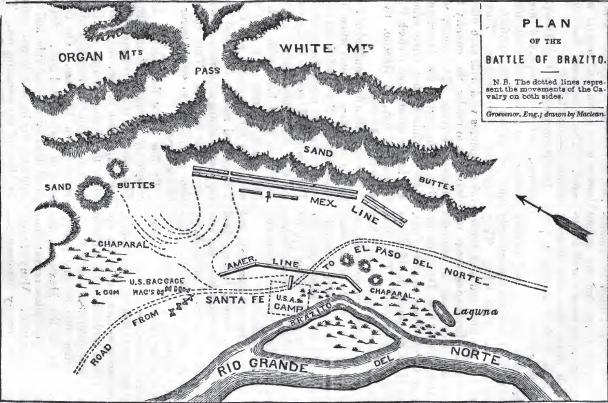
- Doniphan's map
Date	December 25, 1846
Location	near Las Cruces, New Mexico
Result	American victory

Belligerents
Mexico	United States

Commanders and leaders
(Mexico) General Antonio Ponce de Léon; Rafael Carabajal	(United States) Alexander W. Doniphan

Strength
~500	850 mounted riflemen

Casualties and losses
11 or 43 killed 17or ~150 wounded	7 wounded

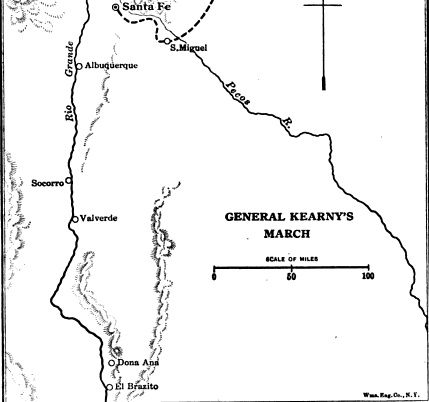
Location of El Brazito

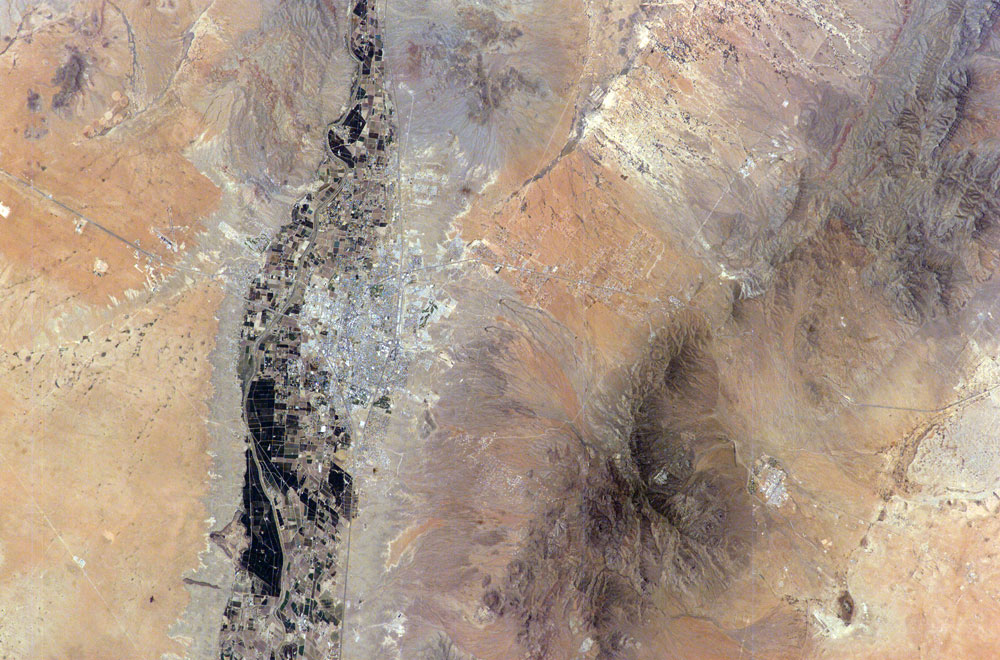
Las Cruces and surrounding terrain from space

The Battle of El Brazito or Bracito took place on December 25, 1846, between the United States Army and the Mexican Army during the Mexican–American War.

== Battle ==
In October 1846, Colonel Alexander W. Doniphan of the First Regiment Mounted Missouri Volunteers was ordered by United States Army General Stephen W. Kearney to rendezvous with General John E. Wool inside Mexico at the city of Chihuahua.

En route to Chihuahua, Doniphan's regiment was attacked by a Mexican army about thirty miles from El Paso del Norte and about 9 miles south of Las Cruces, New Mexico, at Bracito or Brazito on the Rio Grande. Since it was Christmas, Doniphan had halted his men's march at 1 pm that day. However, they spotted the dust cloud of a Mexican scouting party to the south and Colonel Doniphan promptly ordered his men to prepare for battle.

Before long, the Mexican force under the command of Major Antonio Ponce de Leon arrived, consisting of the Chihuahua infantry on the left, the El Paso militia with a howitzer in the center, and the Veracruz lancers on the right. The Mexican Commander in parley demanded the Americans surrender. "Charge and be damned!" responded Col Doniphan. He and his men used the parley delay to fully form their battle line. The Mexicans then made a frontal assault on the American position. Doniphan ordered his troops to hold their fire until the Mexicans came within easy range. At 50 yards the Americans opened fire with their rifles and muskets. Their fire was devastatingly accurate and the Mexican regulars broke and fled. Mexican lancers next attacked Doniphan's wagon train, but were driven off by the teamsters. The Mexican force retreated under the command of Capt. Rafael Carabaja after Ponce was wounded, abandoning their howitzer, which Lt. Nicholas B. Wright's company recovered.

Lieutenant Colonel Philip St. George Cooke, a member of the Army of the West, relates the battle thus:

"On Christmas day, at a spot called Bracito, when the regiment after its usual march, had picketed their horses, and were gathering fuel, the advance guard reported the rapid approach of the enemy in large force. Line was formed on foot, when a black flag was received with an insolent demand. Colonel Doniphan restrained his men from shooting the bearer down. The enemy’s line, nearly half cavalry, and including a howitzer, opened fire at four hundred yards, and still advanced, and had fired three rounds, before fire was returned within effective range. Victory seems to have been decided by a charge of Captain Reid with twenty cavalry which he had managed to mount, and another charge by a dismounted company which captured the howitzer. The enemy fled, with loss of forty-three killed and one hundred and fifty wounded; our loss seven wounded, who all recovered.

The enemy were about twelve hundred strong; five hundred cavalry, the rest infantry, including several hundred El Paso militia; our force was five hundred – Lieutenant-Colonel Jackson with a part of the regiment arriving on the ground after the action. Colonel Doniphan gave credit 'for the most essential service in forming the line and during the engagement' to Captain Thompson, First dragoons, 'acting his aid and adviser.'"

== Aftermath ==
As the Mexican forces fell back, they were harassed by Apache natives who had been watching the battle.

Doniphan's men reached El Paso on December 27, where they seized five tons of powder, 500 arms, 400 lances, and four artillery pieces. Major Meriwether Lewis Clark, Sr. arrived on February 5 with about 100 men and a six-gun battery. Doniphan led his forces southward on February 8, headed to Chihuahua.

== See also ==
- List of battles fought in New Mexico
- List of battles of the Mexican–American War
