= List of battles fought in New Mexico =

This list of battles fought in New Mexico is an incomplete list of military and other armed confrontations that have occurred within the boundaries of the modern U.S. State of New Mexico since European contact. The region was part of the Viceroyalty of New Spain from 1535 to 1821, and then Mexico from 1821 to 1847. Over half of New Mexico was claimed by the Republic of Texas from 1836 to 1841, but control was never established in any form. Full administrative control of New Mexico was established on February 2, 1848 with the signing of the Treaty of Guadalupe Hidalgo which ended the Mexican–American War.

The Mexican–American War, American Civil War, and Plains Indian Wars all directly affected the region during westward expansion.

== Battles ==
| Name | Date | Location | War | Campaign | Dead | Belligerents |
|---|---|---|---|---|---|---|
| Battle of Hawikku | July 7–12, 1540 | near Zuni Pueblo | Spanish colonization | Coronado Expedition | unknown | Spain vs. Zuni |
| Pueblo Revolt | August 10–21, 1680 | Santa Fe de Nuevo México | Spanish colonization | | 400+ | Taos, Picuris, Jemez, Santa Clara, Kewa, Cochiti (aka Kotyit'), Tesuque, Ohkay Owingeh, Nambé pueblos & Apache vs. Spain |
| Recapture of Santa Fe | December 29–30, 1693 | Santa Fe | Spanish colonization | | 89 | Spain & Pecos vs. Taos, Picuris, Jemez, Kha'p'oo Owinge, Kewa, Tesuque, Ohkay Owingeh & Nambé |
| Chimayó Rebellion | August 1–9, 1837 | Rio Arriba County & Santa Fe County | Revolt of 1837 | | ~23 | New Mexico rebels & local Pueblo allies vs. Mexico |
| Texan Santa Fe Expedition | June 19, 1841 - June 13, 1842 | Comancheria & Santa Fe | | | unknown | Republic of Texas vs. Mexico |
| Battle of El Brazito | December 25, 1846 | near Las Cruces | Mexican–American War | New Mexico Campaign | 43 | Mexico vs. United States |
| Battle of Cañada | January 24, 1847 | Santa Cruz | Mexican–American War / Taos Revolt | New Mexico Campaign | 38 | United States vs. Mexico & Pueblo |
| First Battle of Mora | January 24, 1847 | Mora | Mexican–American War / Taos Revolt | New Mexico Campaign | 26 | United States vs. Mexico |
| Second Battle of Mora | February 1, 1847 | Mora | Mexican–American War / Taos Revolt | New Mexico Campaign | unknown | United States vs. Mexico |
| Siege of Pueblo de Taos | February 3–5, 1847 | Taos Pueblo | Mexican–American War / Taos Revolt | New Mexico Campaign | 60+ | United States vs. Mexico |
| Red River Canyon Affair | May 26–27, 1847 | Red River Canyon | Mexican–American War / Taos Revolt | New Mexico Campaign | 25 | United States vs. Mexico, Pueblo, Apache, Kiowa, & Comanche |
| Las Vegas Affair | July 6, 1847 | Las Vegas | Mexican–American War / Taos Revolt | New Mexico Campaign | 10 | United States vs. Mexico |
| Cienega Affair | July 9, 1847 | Cienega Creek near Taos | Mexican–American War / Taos Revolt | New Mexico Campaign | 5+ | United States vs. Mexico & Pueblo |
| White Massacre | October 28, 1849 | Tucumcari, New Mexico | American Indian Wars | Jicarilla War | 5+ | Ute & Jicarilla Apache vs. American settlers |
| First Battle of Mesilla | July 25, 1861 | Mesilla, New Mexico Territory (USA) | American Civil War | | 5–15 | Confederate States of America vs. United States |
| Battle of Canada Alamosa | September 24–25, 1861 | San Ygnacio de la Alamosa | American Civil War | | 6 | Confederate States of America vs. United States |
| Skirmish near Fort Thorn, New Mexico Territory | September 26, 1861 | near Fort Thorn | American Civil War | | 2 | Confederate States of America vs. United States |
| Battle of Valverde | February 20–21, 1862 | near Fort Craig | American Civil War | New Mexico Campaign | 104 | Confederate States of America vs. United States |
| Battle of Glorieta Pass | March 26–28, 1862 | modern Santa Fe County & San Miguel County | American Civil War | New Mexico Campaign | 101 | United States vs. Confederate States of America |
| Battle of Albuquerque | April 8–9, 1862 | Albuquerque | American Civil War | New Mexico Campaign | 1 | United States vs. Confederate States of America |
| Battle of Peralta | April 14, 1862 | Peralta | American Civil War | New Mexico Campaign | 5-6 | United States vs. Confederate States of America |
| Second Battle of Mesilla | July 1, 1862 | Mesilla, Confederate Arizona | American Civil War | | none known | United States vs. Confederate States of America |
| Battle of Pecos River | January 4, 1864 | near Fort Sumner | Navajo Wars | | 40 | United States & Mescalero Apache vs. Navajo |
| Battle of Mount Gray | April 7, 1864 | Mount Gray, modern Hidalgo County | Apache Wars / American Civil War | California Column | 21 | United States vs. Apache |
| Skirmish in Doubtful Canyon | May 3, 1864 | Hidalgo County | Apache Wars / American Civil War | California Column | 10 | United States vs. Apache |
| Battle of Columbus | March 9, 1916 | Columbus | Mexican Revolution | Mexican Border War (1910–1919) | ~138 | United States vs. Conventionists |

== See also ==
- History of New Mexico
- Plains Indians Wars
