= Manuel Antonio Chaves =

New Mexican soldier

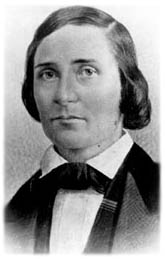
- Major Manuel Antonio Chaves
- Born: October 18, 1818; Albuquerque, Nuevo México, New Spain
- Died: January 1889 (aged 70); San Mateo, New Mexico Territory (now Cibola County, New Mexico, U.S.)
- Military career
- Allegiance: Mexico; United States; Union
- Branch: Militia (Mexico); United States Army; Union Army
- Service years: 1839–1846 (Mexico); 1847–1848, 1861–1865 (USA)
- Rank: Lt. Colonel, USV
- Conflicts: Revolt of 1837; Mexican–American War: Taos Revolt; American Civil War: Battle of Valverde; Battle of Glorieta Pass

Manuel Antonio Chaves or Chávez (October 18, 1818? – January, 1889), known as El Leoncito (the little lion), was a soldier in the Mexican Army and then became a rancher who lived in New Mexico. His life was full of incident, and his courage and marksmanship became legendary in his own time. In documented history, as an American soldier he helped win the American Civil War Battle of Glorieta Pass and was in command during an important fight in the Navajo Wars. As a Mexican soldier he probably negotiated the surrender of a large part of the Texan Santa Fe Expedition.

== Biography ==
Chaves, a lineal descendant of one of the Spanish conquistadores led by Don Juan de Oñate, was born in the village of Atrisco, just west of Albuquerque, then part of the Spanish Empire. At the age of about sixteen, he participated in a trading expedition or slave-taking raid to the Navajo country. His party of approximately fifty ran into a ceremonial gathering of thousands of Navajos, probably at Canyon de Chelly, and was overwhelmed. Chaves, severely wounded by arrows and the only survivor, made his way home alone and without provisions, a journey of almost 200 miles.

The historian Marc Simmons speculates that Chaves's first formal military experience may have been in August 1837, under the command of his cousin Manuel Armijo, who put down an uprising in Santa Fe and made himself governor of New Mexico, by then a province of an independent Mexico. At any rate, in 1839 Chaves was commissioned as an ensign (alférez) in the rural mounted militia. In 1841, he probably negotiated the surrender of about half of the Texas Santa Fe Expedition. According to Twitchell (1909), Chaves received the cross of honor from the Mexican government for that service.

== U.S. invasion and afterwards ==
When the United States invaded in 1846, Chaves again went to fight for Armijo as a militia officer, but Armijo's surrender ended the American capture of Santa Fe before it began. In 1847 Chaves (after having spent some time in jail on suspicion of helping an abortive uprising in Santa Fe) swore an oath of allegiance to the United States. He declined a commission as an officer and enlisted as a private in the U.S. force that put down the Taos Revolt. At the Siege of Pueblo de Taos he saved his captain, Ceran St. Vrain, by clubbing with his rifle a Puebloan with whom St. Vrain was struggling.

Chaves spent the following decade as a rancher, businessman (trading with Indians among others), and Indian fighter. In 1860 he became a lieutenant-colonel in a militia unit, the Second New Mexico Mounted Volunteers, that had just been formed to fight the Navajos and Apaches. The following year, when he was commander of Fort Fauntleroy (later Fort Wingate) and an armistice had been made with the Navajos, allegations of cheating in a horse race led to a fight between his men and visiting Navajos in which a number of Navajos were killed. This event was crucial in the resumption of hostilities that led to the forced Long Walk of the Navajo in 1863 (Dunlay 2000). Kit Carson arrested Chaves after the fight, but with the circumstances of the killings unclear and the Civil War underway, Colonel Edward Canby suspended the house arrest after two months.

In 1862 General Henry Sibley led a force of Texans in an attempt to capture New Mexico for the Confederacy. Chaves, who had declared for the Union, fought with his militia at the Union defeat at Valverde. Then at the Battle of Glorieta Pass, Canby and Major John Chivington chose Chaves to guide Chivington's force to the Confederate supply train. The regular Union soldiers and New Mexico militia destroyed the supplies, which forced the Confederates to retreat to Texas. Although official military records barely mentioned Chaves (Union Army Operations 1960, cited in Simmons 1973), other contemporary accounts described his actions (Whitford 1906, Hays n.d., cited in Simmons).

Chaves was honorably discharged in 1863 (after the dismissal of allegations that he had sold Army wagons for his profit). In that year he engaged in what he later called his greatest fight. A group of Navajos were raiding the Rio Grande valley near Socorro, killing many people and driving off herds of cattle, horses, and sheep. They took captive a son of Matías Contreras, a prominent local citizen. As Contreras would not wait for troops from Fort Craig, Chaves led some 15 civilians on muleback against over 100 Navajos. The Navajos attacked Chaves's group at a spring called Ojo de la Mónica, immediately killing all the mules with rifle shots and forcing their pursuers to take cover. As Chaves was the best marksman, he fired his own rifle and also some of the others' while they reloaded his. By nightfall, only Chaves, Contreras, and one other man remained alive. At dawn they found that the Navajos had retreated, not knowing that Chaves had only three bullets left. (Contreras ransomed his son some months later.)

In 1863, the Long Walk ended the Indian wars in most of New Mexico. Chaves spent the rest of his life ranching in the San Mateo Mountains, building his home within a hundred feet of oak trees where he had rested in his flight from Canyon de Chelly as a teenager. Immediately behind those trees he built a family chapel, where he was buried along with his wife and children.

== Depiction in fiction ==
Chaves appears as a minor character in Death Comes for the Archbishop by Willa Cather, who consulted with Chaves's son Amado. Chaves is depicted as a friend of Archbishop "Latour" (Jean Baptiste Lamy). However, the only interaction between Chaves and Lamy known to history is that, probably during the late 1850s, Lamy excommunicated Chaves during a dispute over the property line between a chapel and Chaves's house in Santa Fe. Chaves, his half-brother Román Baca, and a servant brought loaded rifles to the next Mass, and the priest did not read the order of excommunication.

== See also ==
- Hispanics in the American Civil War
