= Erlinda Gonzáles-Berry =

American literary critic and writer of Hispanic descent

Erlinda Gonzáles-Berry (born August 23, 1942) is an American literary critic and writer of Hispanic descent.

== Personal life ==
The daughter of Carlota and Canuto Gonzáles, she was born on the family farm near Roy, New Mexico and grew up in Roy and in Rosebud, New Mexico. She married Edward Berry; the couple had one daughter.

== Academia ==
Gonzáles-Berry was educated at a boarding school in El Rito and went on to receive a BS in Education and a PhD in Romance Languages from the University of New Mexico. She taught Spanish at Earlham College for four years. She then taught for one year at New Mexico State University, moving to the University of New Mexico in 1979 and becoming a full professor there four years later. In 1992, she was elected chair of the Spanish department.

From 1997-2007 Gonzáles-Berry chaired the Ethnic Studies Department at Oregon State University, specializing in teaching Latino literature and culture. She was a member of various boards including: the Oregon Commission for Hispanic Affairs, the New Mexico Endowment for the Humanities board, and the National Advisory Board of the U.S. Latino Literary Heritage Project. She retired from OSU in 2007 and found Casa Latinos Unidos, a non-profit community center that offered cultural support and social services to the Latino/a community in Lynn and Benton Counties.

== Writings ==
Her writings on literature include Las Mujeres Hablan: An Anthology of Nuevo Mexicana Writers published in 1988 and Pasó por aquí : critical essays on the New Mexican literary tradition, 1542-1988 published in 1989. She was also editor of Contested Homeland: A Chicano. History of New Mexico and Herencia: The Anthology of Hispanic Literature of the United States. In 1991, she published the novel Paletitas de Guayaba, a fictional autobiography.
