= Stephen W. Kearny =

United States general (1794–1848)

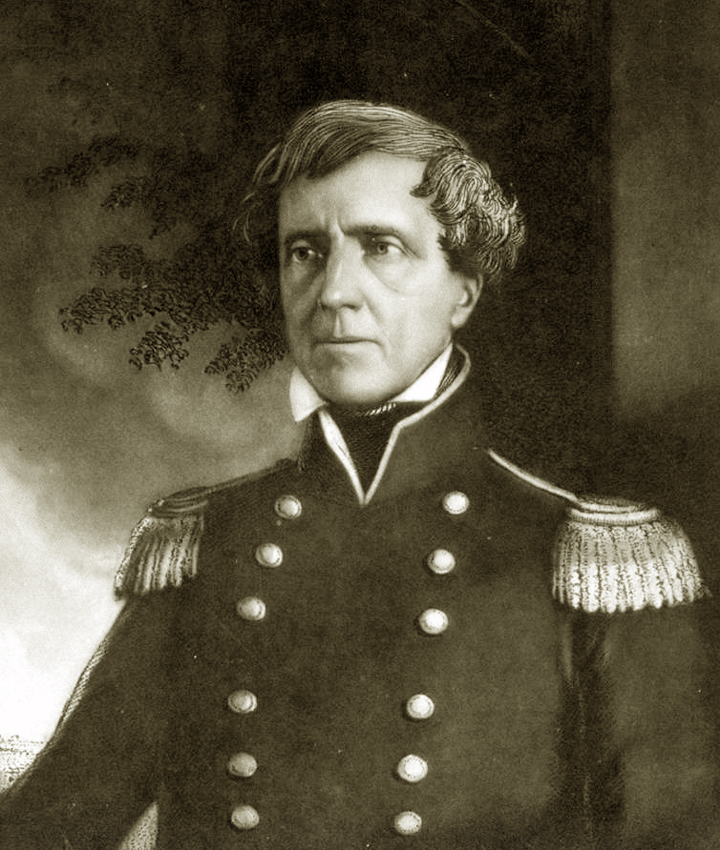

Military Governor of New Mexico
- In office August 1846 – September 1846
- Preceded by: Juan Bautista Vigil y Alarid
- Succeeded by: Sterling Price

4th Military Governor of California
- In office February 23, 1847 – May 31, 1847
- Preceded by: Robert F. Stockton
- Succeeded by: Richard Barnes Mason

Personal details
- Born: Stephen Watts Kearny; August 30, 1794 Newark, New Jersey, U.S.
- Died: October 31, 1848 (aged 54) St. Louis, Missouri, U.S.
- Spouse: Mary Radford
- Children: 11 (5 of whom survived childhood)
- Profession: Soldier

Military service
- Allegiance: United States of America
- Branch/service: Dragoons
- Years of service: 1812–1848
- Rank: Brigadier General; Brevet Major General
- Unit: Cantonment Missouri
- Commands: Jefferson Barracks; The Old Guard; 1st U.S. Dragoons; Army of the West; Veracruz; Mexico City
- Battles/wars: War of 1812; Battle of Queenston Heights; Mexican–American War; Capture of Santa Fe; Conquest of California

Stephen Watts Kearny (/ˈkɑːrni/ KAR-nee) (August 30, 1794 – October 31, 1848) was one of the foremost antebellum frontier officers of the United States Army. Known as the father of the U.S. Cavalry, he is remembered for his significant contributions in the Mexican–American War, especially the Conquest of California. The Kearny Code, proclaimed on September 22, 1846, in Santa Fe, established the law and government of the newly acquired territory of New Mexico and was named after him. His nephew was Major General Philip Kearny of American Civil War fame.

== Early years ==
Born in Newark, New Jersey, Stephen Watts Kearny was the fifteenth and youngest child of Philip III (1733-1798) and Susanna Watts Kearny (1747-1823). His father, who was of Irish ancestry (the family name stemming from O'Kearny and the Irish Gaelic "Cearnach"), was a successful wine merchant and landowner in Perth Amboy, New Jersey, before the start of the American Revolution. Although sometimes incorrectly spelled as Kearney, the New Jersey branch of Kearnys have insisted their surname should be spelled the Irish way—Kearny. His maternal grandparents were the wealthy merchant John Watts of New York and Anne Delancey Watts, daughter of Stephen Delancey.

Stephen Watts Kearny attended Columbia University in New York City for two years At Columbia, where he was a member of the Philolexian Society. He joined the New York militia as an ensign in 1812.

== Marriage and family ==
In the late 1820s, after his career was established, Kearny met, courted, and married Mary Radford, the stepdaughter of William Clark of the Lewis and Clark Expedition. The couple had eleven children, of whom six died in childhood. He was the uncle of Philip Kearny, a Union Major General in the American Civil War who was killed at the Battle of Chantilly.

== Career ==
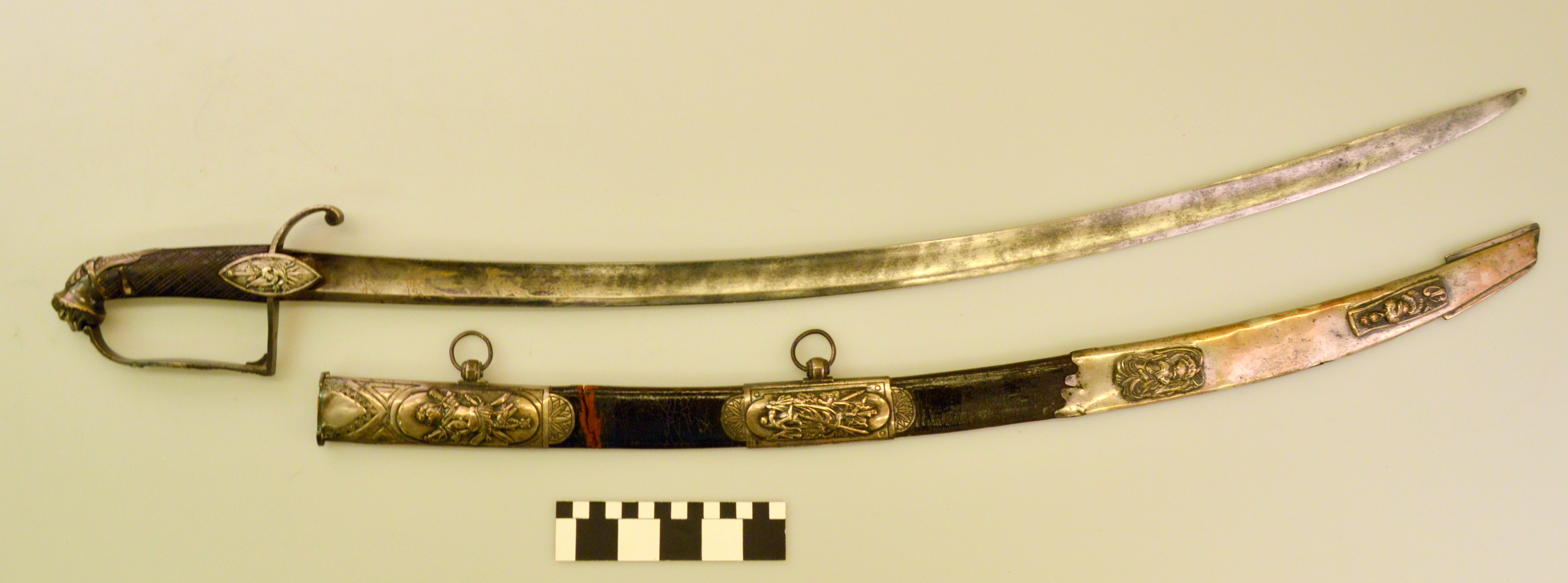
Sword and scabbard used during the War of 1812 by Stephen Watts Kearny

In 1812, Kearny was commissioned as a first lieutenant in the War of 1812 in the 13th Infantry Regiment in the U.S. Army. On October 13, 1812, during the Battle of Queenston Heights, Kearny and Lieutenant Colonel Winfield Scott led a charge that took the British position, but the British retook it when the "untrained militiamen" did not reinforce the U.S. regulars who had taken the objective. "Humiliated, Kearny and Scott were forced to surrender"; wounded and captured, he and Scott spent several months in captivity before being paroled. This experience hardened his prejudice against militias for the rest of his army career. Kearny was promoted to captain on April 1, 1813. After the war, he chose to remain in the U.S. Army and was promoted to brevet major in 1823; major in 1829; and lieutenant colonel in 1833. He was assigned to the western frontier under the command of General Henry Atkinson. In 1819, he was a member of the expedition to explore the Yellowstone River in present-day Montana and Wyoming. The Yellowstone Expedition of 1819 journeyed only as far as present-day Nebraska, where it established Cantonment Missouri, later renamed Fort Atkinson. Kearny was also on the 1825 expedition that reached the mouth of the Yellowstone River. During his travels, he kept extensive journals, including his interactions with Native Americans.

In 1826, Captain Kearny was appointed as the first commander of the new Jefferson Barracks in St. Louis, Missouri. While stationed there, he was often invited to the nearby city, the center of fur trade, economics, and politics of the region. By way of Meriwether Lewis Clark Sr., he was invited as a guest of William Clark of the Lewis and Clark Expedition.

In 1833, Lieutenant Colonel Kearny was appointed second in command of the newly organized 1st Dragoon Regiment. The U.S. Cavalry eventually grew out of this regiment, which was re-designated the 1st United States Cavalry in 1861, earning Kearny his nickname "father of the United States Cavalry". The regiment was stationed at Fort Leavenworth in present-day Kansas, and Kearny was promoted to the rank of colonel in command of the regiment in 1836. He was also made commander of the Army's Third Military Department, charged with protecting the frontier and preserving peace among the tribes of Native Americans on the Great Plains.

By the early 1840s, when emigrants began traveling along the Oregon Trail, Kearny often ordered his men to escort the travelers across the plains to avoid attack by the Native Americans. The practice of the military's escorting settlers' wagon trains would become official government policy in succeeding decades. To protect the travelers, Kearny established a new post along Table Creek near present-day Nebraska City, Nebraska. The outpost was named Fort Kearny. However, the Army realized that the site was not well chosen, and the post was moved to its present location on the Platte River in central Nebraska.

In May 1845, Kearny marched his 1st Dragoons of 15 officers and 250 men in a column of twos out the gates of Ft. Leavenworth for a nearly four-month-long reconnaissance into the Rocky Mountains and the South Pass, "the gateway to Oregon." The Dragoons traveled light and fast, hauling 17 supply wagons and driving 50 sheep and 25 cattle. Kearny's Dragoons covered nearly 20 miles (32 km) a day. Upon their approach to Ft. Laramie, they had traveled nearly 600 miles (970 km) in four weeks. "Barely two weeks later Kearny and his troopers stood atop South Pass, held a regimental muster on the continental divide, and turned toward home." He marched his Dragoons down the Rocky Mountains, past the future site of Denver, Colorado, then Bent's Fort, then onto the Santa Fe Trail. When they returned to Ft. Leavenworth on August 24, 1845, they had successfully conducted a reconnaissance of over 2,000 miles (3,200 km) in 99 days. "The march of the 1st dragoons was truly an outstanding example of cavalry mobility."

=== Mexican–American War (1846–1848) ===
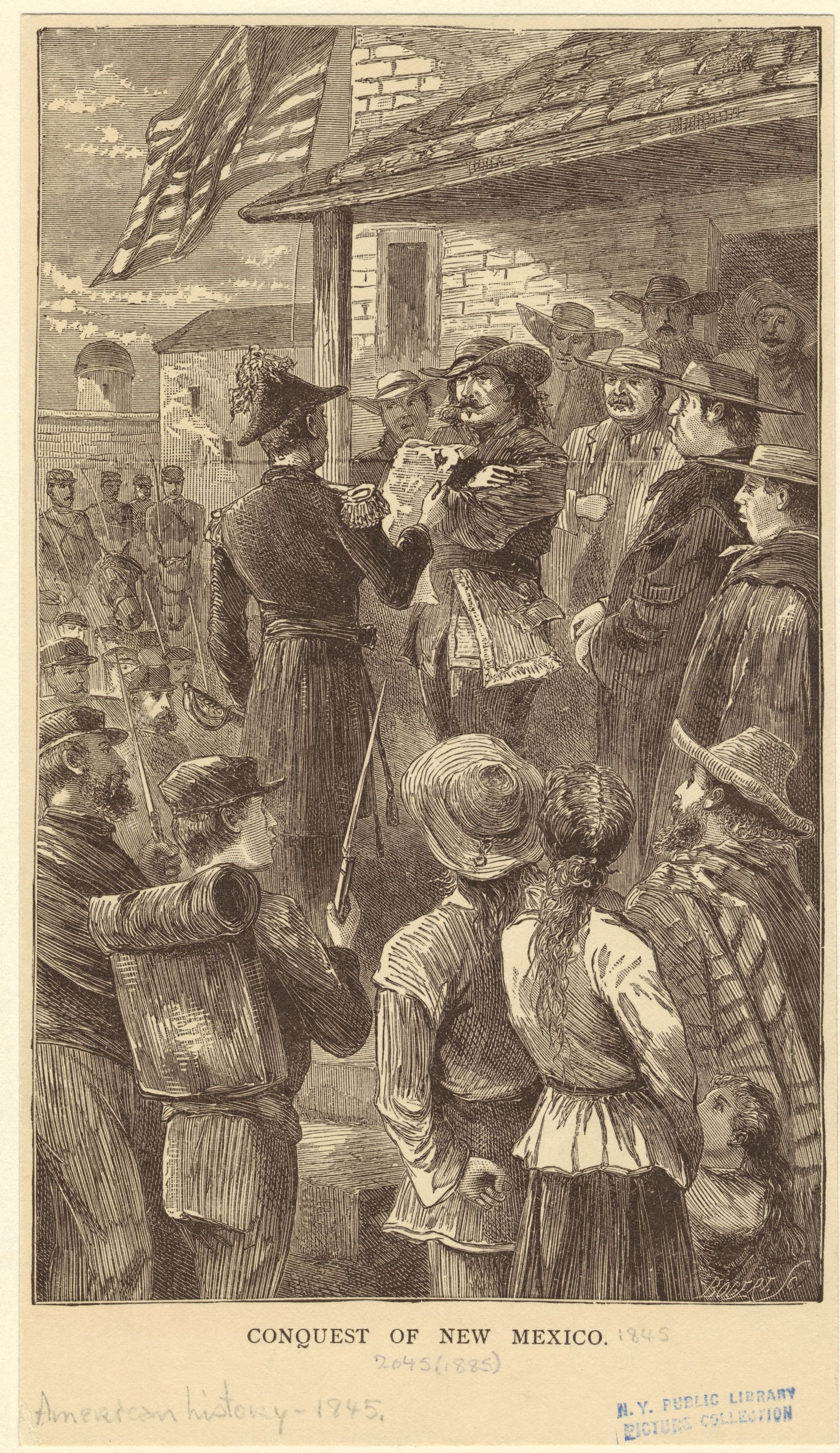
Gen. Kearny proclaiming New Mexico part of the United States, August 15, 1846, on the Plaza in Las Vegas, New Mexico

At the outset of the Mexican–American War, Kearny was promoted to brigadier general on June 30, 1846, and took a force of about 2,500 men to Santa Fe, New Mexico. His Army of the West (1846) consisted of 1,600 men in the volunteer First and Second Regiments of Fort Leavenworth, Missouri Mounted Cavalry regiment under Alexander Doniphan; an artillery and infantry battalion; 300 of Kearny's 1st U.S. Dragoons and about 500 members of the Mormon Battalion. With this force, and due largely to the behind the scenes and coordinated efforts of U.S. President Polk, New Mexico Governor Armijo, and the American merchant James Wiley Magoffin, who had 20 years of trading experience in Mexico; Kearny was able to comply with the president's wishes, and conquer New Mexico without firing a shot. Kearny established a joint civil and military government, appointing Charles Bent, a prominent Santa Fe Trail trader living in Taos, New Mexico as acting civil. He divided his forces into four commands: one, under Col. Sterling Price, appointed military governor, was to occupy and maintain order in New Mexico with his approximately 800 men; a second group under Col. Alexander William Doniphan, with a little over 800 men was ordered to capture El Paso, in the state of Chihuahua, Mexico and then join up with General John E. Wool; the third command of about 300 dragoons mounted on mules, he led under his command to California along the Gila River trail. The Mormon Battalion, mostly marching on foot under Lt. Col. Philip St. George Cooke, was directed to follow Kearny with wagons to blaze a new southern wagon route to California.

On the plaza in Santa Fe, a monument marks a fateful day. Gen. Kearny had entered the city after routing the militia of New Mexico under the command of Governor Armijo and entered a city then undefended but very hostile. He marched to the plaza in front of the Palacio Real, and took down the flag of the state of New Mexico, which he thought was the flag of Mexico. In its place he hoisted the Stars and Stripes and gave the speech which is summarized on the monument. New Mexico was then a state with a democratically constituted government, which Kearny overthrew, installing in its place under the Kearny Code a military dictatorship. The next year, in 1847, three men pressed the case for the restoration of New Mexico's statehood and its admission to the American Union: Zachary Taylor, Abraham Lincoln, and Kearny's rival, John Charles Frémont. New Mexico's statehood and self-government were not restored until 1912.

==== California ====
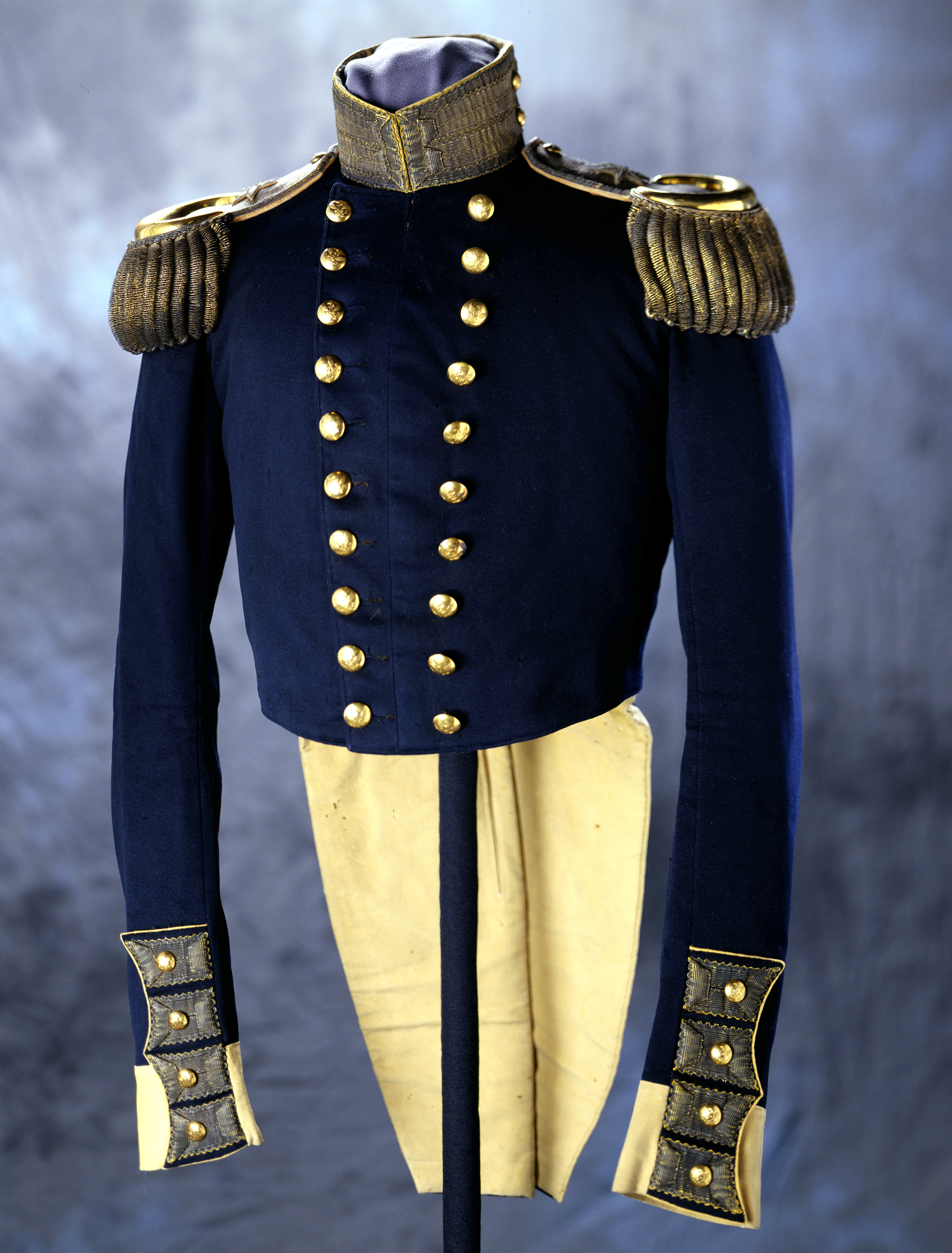
Stephen Watts Kearny's U.S. Dragoons officer's full dress coat in the 1840s

Kearny, per orders from President Polk, set out to "conquer and take possession of California" on September 25, 1846, with a force of 300 men. En route he encountered Kit Carson, a scout of John C. Frémont's California Battalion, carrying messages back to Washington, D.C., on the status of hostilities in California. Kearny learned that California was, at the time of Carson's last information, under American control of the marines and bluejacket sailors of Commodore Robert F. Stockton of the U.S. Navy's Pacific Squadron and Frémont's California Battalion. Kearny asked Carson to guide him back to California while he sent Carson's messages east with a different courier. Kearny sent 200 dragoons back to Santa Fe believing that California was secure. After traveling almost 2,000 miles (3,200 km) his weary 100 dragoons and most of his nearly worn-out mounts were replaced by untrained mules purchased from a mule herder's herd being driven to Santa Fe from California. On a trip across the Colorado Desert to San Diego Kearny encountered marine Major Archibald H. Gillespie and about 30 men with news of an ongoing Californio revolt in Los Angeles.

On a wet day, December 6, 1846, Kearny's forces encountered Andrés Pico (Californio Governor Pio Pico's brother) and a force of about 150 Californio Lancers. With most of his men mounted on weary untrained mules, his command executed an uncoordinated attack of Pico's force. They found most of their powder wet and pistols and carbines would not fire. They soon found their mules and cavalry sabers were poor defense against Californio Lancers mounted on well-trained horses. Kearny's column, along with the small force of Marines and volunteer militia, suffered defeat. About 18 men of Kearny's force were killed; retreating to a hilltop to dry their powder and treat their wounded, they were surrounded by Andre Pico's forces. Kearny was slightly wounded in this encounter, the Battle of San Pasqual. Kit Carson got through Pico's men and returned to San Diego. Commodore Stockton sent a combined force of U.S. Marine and U.S. Navy bluejacket sailors under Capt. Archibald H. Gillespie (USMC), and Lieutenant Edward F. Beale (USN), to relieve Kearny's column. The U.S. forces quickly drove out the Californios. In January 1847 a combined force of about 600 men consisting of Kearny's dragoons, Stockton's marines and sailors, and two companies of Frémont's California Battalion won the Battle of Rio San Gabriel and the Battle of La Mesa and retook control of Los Angeles on January 10, 1847. The Californio forces in California capitulated on January 13 to Lt. Col. John C. Frémont and his California Battalion. The Treaty of Cahuenga ended the fighting of the Mexican–American War in Alta California on that date. Kearny and Stockton decided to accept the liberal terms offered by Frémont to terminate hostilities, despite Andrés Pico's breaking his earlier, solemn pledge that he would not fight U.S. forces.

As the ranking Army officer, and per orders from President Polk, Kearny claimed command of California at the end of hostilities despite the fact that California was initially brought under U.S. control by Commodore Stockton's, (Note: Stockton appointed Marine Corps Capt. Gillespie temporary military governor/mayor of Los Angeles in 1846. California was conquered. Then the people of Los Angeles revolted, forcing Gillespie and his men to evacuate to ships waiting in Los Angeles harbor (San Pedro). When Kearny arrived at San Pasqual, California was not a conquered country. California would be conquered in 1847.) Pacific Squadron's forces. This began a rivalry with Stockton, whose rank was equivalent to a rear admiral (lower half) today. Kearny had the same equivalent rank (one star) and unfortunately, the War Department had not worked out a protocol for who would be in charge. Stockton seized on the treaty of capitulation and appointed Frémont military governor of California.

In July 1846, Col. Jonathan D. Stevenson of New York was asked to raise a volunteer regiment of 10 companies of 77 men each to go to California with the understanding that they would muster out and stay in California. They were designated the 1st Regiment of New York Volunteers and fought in the California Campaign and the Pacific Coast Campaign. In August 1846 and September the regiment trained and prepared for the trip to California. Three private merchant ships, Thomas H Perkins, Loo Choo and Susan Drew, were chartered, and the sloop USS Preble was assigned convoy detail. On 26 September the four ships left New York for California. Fifty men who had been left behind for various reasons sailed on November 13, 1846, on the small storeship USS Brutus. The Susan Drew and Loo Choo reached Valparaíso, Chile by January 20, 1847, and after getting fresh supplies, water and wood were on their way again by January 23. The Perkins did not stop until San Francisco, reaching port on March 6, 1847. The Susan Drew arrived on March 20 and the Loo Choo arrived on March 16, 183 days after leaving New York. The Brutus finally arrived on April 17.

After desertions and deaths in transit the four ships brought 648 men to California. The companies were then deployed throughout Upper (Alta) and Lower (Baja) California from San Francisco to La Paz, Mexico. These troops finally allowed Kearny to assume command of California as ranking Army officer. The troops essentially took over all of the Pacific Squadron's on-shore military and garrison duties and the California Battalion and Mormon Battalion's garrison duties as well as some Baja California duties.

With all these reinforcements in hand Kearny assumed command, appointed his own territorial military governor and ordered Frémont to resign and accompany him back to Fort Leavenworth, Kansas. On Kearny and Frémont's trip back east on the California Trail, accompanied by some members of the Mormon Battalion who had re-enlisted, they found and buried some of the Donner Party's remains on their trip over the Sierra Nevadas. Once at Fort Leavenworth, Frémont was restricted to barracks and ordered court-martialed for insubordination and willfully disregarding an order. A court martial convicted Frémont and ordered that he receive a dishonorable discharge, but President James K. Polk quickly commuted Frémont's sentence due to services he had rendered over his career. Frémont resigned his commission in disgust and settled in California. In 1847 Frémont purchased the Rancho Las Mariposas, a large land grant in the foothills of the Sierra Nevada mountains near Yosemite, which proved to be rich in gold. Frémont was later elected one of the first U.S. senators from California and was the first presidential candidate of the new Republican Party in 1856.

=== Governorship and last years ===
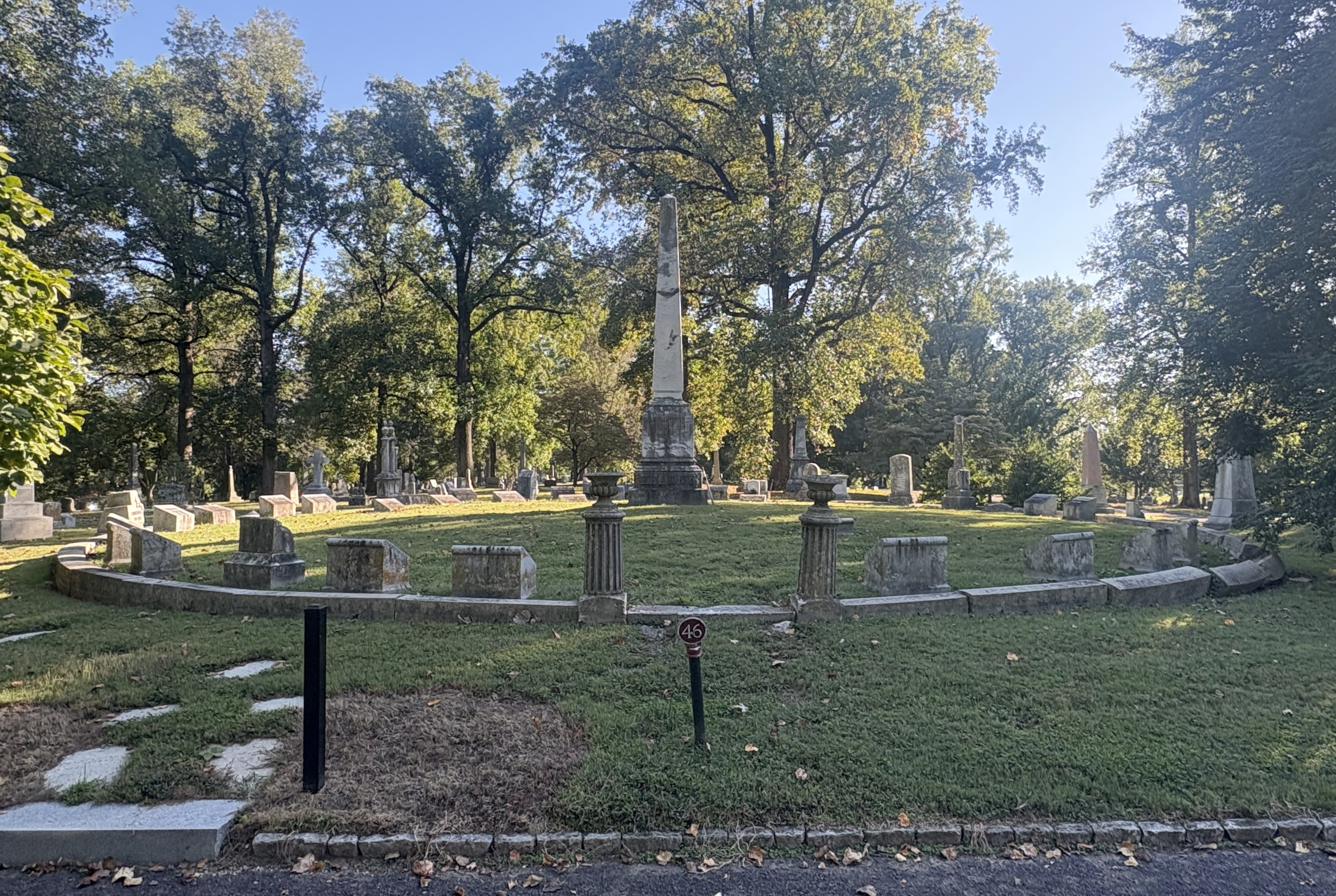
Kearny's grave at Bellefontaine Cemetery

Kearny remained military governor of California until May 31, when he set out overland across the California Trail to Washington, D.C., and was welcomed as a hero. He was appointed governor of Veracruz, and later of Mexico City. He also received a brevet promotion to major general in September 1848, over the heated opposition of Frémont's father-in-law, Senator Thomas Hart Benton.

After contracting yellow fever in Veracruz, Kearny had to return to St. Louis. He died there on October 31, 1848, at the age of 54. He was buried at Bellefontaine Cemetery, now a National Historic Landmark in St. Louis.

== Legacy and memory ==
Historian Allan Nevins, examining his attacks on Frémont, states that Kearny:

was a stern-tempered soldier who made few friends and many enemies – who has been justly characterized by the most careful historian of the period, Justin H. Smith, as "grasping, jealous, domineering, and harsh." Possessing these traits, feeling his pride stung by his defeat at San Pasqual, and anxious to assert his authority, he was no sooner in Los Angeles than he quarreled bitterly with Stockton; and Frémont was not only at once involved in this quarrel, but inherited the whole burden of it as soon as Stockton left the country.

Kearny "was simply, a professional soldier's soldier, and he "may have been the only general in the Mexican War who did not long to become president.

Kearny is the namesake of Kearny, Arizona and Kearney, Nebraska. Kearny, New Jersey near Kearny's place of birth, is named after his nephew, Philip Kearny Jr. of American Civil War fame. Many schools are named after Kearny, including Kearny Elementary in Santa Fe, New Mexico and Kearny High School in the San Diego neighborhood of Kearny Mesa. Kearny Street, in downtown San Francisco, is also named for him, as is a street within Fort Leavenworth, Kansas. Camp Kearny in San Diego, a U.S. military base which operated from 1917 to 1946 on the site of today's Marine Corps Air Station Miramar, was named in his honor. Fort Kearny in Nebraska is also named for him.

Two U.S. postage stamps relate to Kearny. Scott catalog number 970, printed in 1948, commemorates Fort Kearny, and number 944, issued in 1946, the capture of Santa Fe. The accuracy of the latter's depiction has been questioned.

Actor Robert Anderson (1920–1996) played General Kearny in the 1966 episode "The Firebrand" of the syndicated western television series Death Valley Days. Gregg Barton was cast as Commodore Robert F. Stockton, with Gerald Mohr as Andrés Pico and Will Kuluva as Pio Pico. The episode is set in 1848 with the establishment of California Territory and the tensions between the outgoing Mexican government and the incoming American governor.

Stephen W. Kearny is the default name of the United States hero unit in Age of Empires III: Definitive Edition.
