= Treason laws in the United States =

In the United States, there are both federal and state laws prohibiting treason. Treason is defined on the federal level in Article III, Section 3 of the United States Constitution as "only in levying War against [the United States], or in adhering to their Enemies, giving them Aid and Comfort." Most state constitutions include similar definitions of treason, specifically limited to levying war against the state, "adhering to the enemies" of the state, or aiding the enemies of the state, and requiring two witnesses or a confession in open court. Fewer than 30 people have ever been charged with treason under these laws.

In the United States, Benedict Arnold's name is considered synonymous with treason due to his collaboration with the British during the American Revolutionary War. Arnold became a general in the British Army, which protected him. John Bly and Charles Rose were convicted of treason and hanged for their participation in Shays' Rebellion. These cases occurred before the adoption of the United States Constitution in 1789. Since the Constitution came into effect, there have been fewer than 40 federal prosecutions for treason and even fewer convictions. A handful of other people convicted of the offense at the federal level have been pardoned. The first example was such as militants John Mitchell and Philip Weigel from the Whiskey Rebellion, were both pardoned by President George Washington.

Death sentences for treason under the Constitution have been carried out 16 times. The United States executed 15 Taos Revolt insurgents led by Pablo Montoya and Tomás Romero in 1847. The United States executed William Bruce Mumford in 1862 during the Civil War.

== Federal history ==
=== Shays' Rebellion ===
Shays's Rebellion was an armed uprising in Western Massachusetts and Worcester in response to a debt crisis among the citizenry and in opposition to the state government's increased efforts to collect taxes on both individuals and their trades. The fighting took place in the areas around Springfield during 1786 and 1787. Historically, scholars have argued that the four thousand rebels, called Shaysites, who protested against economic and civil rights injustices by the Massachusetts Government were led by Revolutionary War veteran Daniel Shays. By the early 2020s, scholarship has suggested that Shays's role in the protests was significantly and strategically exaggerated by Massachusetts elites, who had a political interest in shifting blame for bad economic conditions away from themselves.

In 1787, the protesters marched on the federal Springfield Armory in an unsuccessful attempt to seize its weaponry and overthrow the government. The federal government, severely limited in its prerogatives under the Articles of Confederation, found itself unable to finance troops to put down the rebellion; it was consequently put down by the Massachusetts State Militia under William Shepard, alongside a privately funded local militia led by former Continental Army officer Benjamin Lincoln. The widely-held view had already developed that the Articles of Confederation were untenable and needed amending, with the events of the rebellion serving as further evidence for the later Constitutional Convention. There is continuing debate among scholars as to what extent the rebellion influenced the later drafting and ratification of the Constitution.

Four thousand people signed confessions acknowledging participation in the events of the rebellion in exchange for amnesty. Several hundred participants were eventually indicted on charges relating to the rebellion, but most of these were pardoned under a general amnesty that excluded only a few ringleaders. Eighteen men were convicted and sentenced to death, but most of these had their sentences commuted or overturned on appeal or were pardoned. John Bly and Charles Rose were hanged on December 6, 1787. They were also accused of a common-law crime for looting.

Shays was pardoned in 1788 and he returned to Massachusetts from hiding in the Vermont woods. He was vilified by the Boston press, who painted him as an archetypal anarchist opposed to the government. He later moved to the Conesus, New York area, where he died poor and obscure in 1825.

The crushing of the rebellion and the harsh terms of reconciliation imposed by the Disqualification Act all worked against Governor Bowdoin politically. He received few votes from the rural parts of the state and was trounced by John Hancock in the gubernatorial election of 1787. The military victory was tempered by tax changes in subsequent years. The legislature cut taxes and placed a moratorium on debts and also refocused state spending away from interest payments, resulting in a 30-percent decline in the value of Massachusetts securities as those payments fell in arrears.

Vermont was an unrecognized independent republic that had been seeking independent statehood from New York's claims to the territory. It became an unexpected beneficiary of the rebellion by sheltering the rebel ringleaders. Alexander Hamilton broke from other New Yorkers, including major landowners with claims on Vermont territory, calling for the state to recognize and support Vermont's bid for admission to the union. He cited Vermont's de facto independence and its ability to cause trouble by providing support to the discontented from neighboring states, and he introduced legislation that broke the impasse between New York and Vermont. Vermonters responded favorably to the overture by publicly pushing Eli Parsons and Luke Day out of the state (but quietly continuing to support others). Vermont became the fourteenth state after negotiations with New York and the passage of the new constitution.

=== Adoption of the US Constitution ===
Thomas Jefferson was serving as ambassador to France at the time and refused to be alarmed by Shays's Rebellion. He argued in a letter to James Madison on January 30, 1787, that occasional rebellion serves to preserve freedoms. In a letter to William Stephens Smith on November 13, 1787, Jefferson wrote, "The tree of liberty must be refreshed from time to time with the blood of patriots and tyrants. It is its natural manure." In contrast, George Washington had been calling for constitutional reform for many years, and he wrote in a letter dated October 31, 1786, to Henry Lee, "You talk, my good sir, of employing influence to appease the present tumults in Massachusetts. I know not where that influence is to be found, or, if attainable, that it would be a proper remedy for the disorders. Influence is not government. Let us have a government by which our lives, liberties, and properties will be secured, or let us know the worst at once."

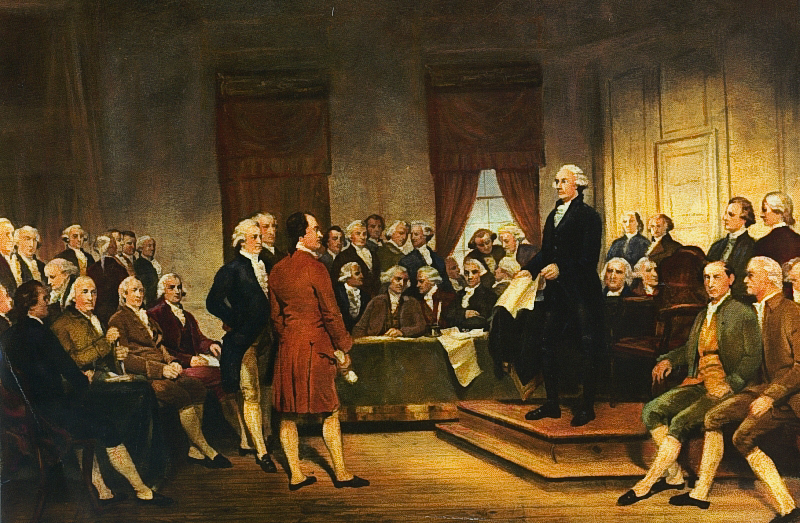
The 1787 Constitutional Convention by Junius Brutus Stearns, 1856

At the time of the rebellion, the weaknesses of the federal government as constituted under the Articles of Confederation were apparent to many. A vigorous debate was going on throughout the states on the need for a stronger central government, with Federalists arguing for the idea, and Anti-Federalists opposing them. Historical opinion is divided on what sort of role the rebellion played in the formation and later ratification of the United States Constitution, although most scholars agree that it played some role, at least temporarily drawing some anti-Federalists to the strong government side.

By early 1785, many influential merchants and political leaders were already agreed that a stronger central government was needed. Shortly after Shays's Rebellion broke out, delegates from five states met in Annapolis, Maryland from September 11–14, 1786, and they concluded that vigorous steps were needed to reform the federal government, but they disbanded because of a lack of full representation and authority, calling for a convention of all the states to be held in Philadelphia in May 1787. Historian Robert Feer notes that several prominent figures had hoped that the convention would fail, requiring a larger-scale convention, and French diplomat Louis-Guillaume Otto thought that the convention was intentionally broken off early to achieve this end.

In early 1787, John Jay wrote that the rural disturbances and the inability of the central government to fund troops in response made "the inefficiency of the Federal government more and more manifest". Henry Knox observed that the uprising in Massachusetts clearly influenced local leaders who had previously opposed a strong federal government. Historian David Szatmary writes that the timing of the rebellion "convinced the elites of sovereign states that the proposed gathering at Philadelphia must take place". Some states delayed choosing delegates to the proposed convention, including Massachusetts, in part because it resembled the "extra-legal" conventions organized by the protestors before the rebellion became violent.

The convention that met in Philadelphia then was dominated by strong-government advocates. Delegate Oliver Ellsworth of Connecticut argued that because the people could not be trusted (as exemplified by Shays's Rebellion), the members of the federal House of Representatives should be chosen by state legislatures, not by popular vote. The example of Shays's Rebellion may also have been influential in the addition of language to the constitution concerning the ability of states to manage domestic violence, and their ability to demand the return of individuals from other states for trial.

The rebellion also played a role in the discussion of the number of chief executives the United States would have going forward. While mindful of tyranny, delegates of the Constitutional Convention thought that the single executive would be more effective in responding to national disturbances.

Federalists cited the rebellion as an example of the confederation government's weaknesses, while opponents such as Elbridge Gerry, a merchant speculator and Massachusetts delegate from Essex County, thought that a federal response to the rebellion would have been even worse than that of the state. He was one of the few convention delegates who refused to sign the new constitution, although his reasons for doing so did not stem from the rebellion.

When the constitution had been drafted, Massachusetts was viewed by Federalists as a state that might not ratify it, because of widespread anti-Federalist sentiment in the rural parts of the state. Massachusetts Federalists, including Henry Knox, were active in courting swing votes in the debates leading up to the state's ratifying convention in 1788. When the vote was taken on February 6, 1788, representatives of rural communities involved in the rebellion voted against ratification by a wide margin, but the day was carried by a coalition of merchants, urban elites, and market town leaders. The state ratified the constitution by a vote of 187 to 168.

Historians are divided on the impact the rebellion had on the ratification debates. Robert Feer notes that major Federalist pamphleteers rarely mentioned it and that some anti-Federalists used the fact that Massachusetts survived the rebellion as evidence that a new constitution was unnecessary. Leonard Richards counters that publications like the Pennsylvania Gazette explicitly tied anti-Federalist opinion to the rebel cause, calling opponents of the new constitution "Shaysites" and the Federalists "Washingtonians".

David Szatmary argues that debate in some states was affected, particularly in Massachusetts, where the rebellion had a polarizing effect. Richards records Henry Jackson's observation that opposition to ratification in Massachusetts was motivated by "that cursed spirit of insurgency", but that broader opposition in other states originated in other constitutional concerns expressed by Elbridge Gerry, who published a widely distributed pamphlet outlining his concerns about the vagueness of some of the powers granted in the constitution and its lack of a Bill of Rights.

=== Legal Definition ===
Definition: In Article III, Section 3 of the United States Constitution, treason is specifically limited to levying war against the U.S., or adhering to their enemies, giving them aid and comfort.

Penalty: Under U.S. Code Title 18, the penalty is death, or not less than five years' imprisonment (with a minimum fine of $10,000, if not sentenced to death). Any person convicted of treason against the United States also forfeits the right to hold public office in the United States.

The terms used in the definition derive from English legal tradition, specifically the Treason Act 1351. Levying war means the assembly of armed people to overthrow the government or to resist its laws. Enemies are subjects of a foreign government that is in open hostility with the United States. Treason does not distinguish between participants and accessories; all persons who rebel or intentionally give aid to hostilities are subject to the same charge.

Death sentences for treason under the Constitution have been carried out in only 16 instances: the executions of 15 Taos Revolt insurgents in 1847 led by Pablo Montoya and Tomás Romero, and the execution of William Bruce Mumford during the Civil War. A handful of other people convicted of the offense at the federal level – such as two militants from the Whiskey Rebellion (John Mitchell and Philip Weigel, who were both pardoned by President George Washington.) and several people after World War II – have mostly been pardoned or released. The last federal treason conviction to be fully upheld was that of Nazi sympathizer Herbert John Burgman in 1949.

=== Whiskey Rebellion ===
The Whiskey Rebellion was a violent tax protest in the United States beginning in 1791 and ending in 1794 during the presidency of George Washington. The so-called "whiskey tax" was the first tax imposed on a domestic product by the newly formed federal government. The "whiskey tax" became law in 1791, and was intended to generate revenue to pay the war debt incurred during the American Revolutionary War. Farmers of the western frontier were accustomed to distilling their surplus rye, barley, wheat, corn, or fermented grain mixtures to make whiskey. These farmers resisted the tax. Throughout western Pennsylvania counties, protesters used violence and intimidation to prevent federal officials from collecting the tax. Resistance came to a climax in July 1794, when a US marshal arrived in western Pennsylvania to serve writs to distillers who had not paid the excise. The alarm was raised, and more than 500 armed men attacked the fortified home of tax inspector John Neville. Washington responded by sending peace commissioners to western Pennsylvania to negotiate with the rebels, while at the same time calling on governors to send a militia force to enforce the tax. Washington himself rode at the head of an army to suppress the insurgency, with 13,000 militiamen provided by the governors of Virginia, Maryland, New Jersey, and Pennsylvania. The leaders of the rebels all fled before the arrival of the army, and there was no confrontation. About 150 men were arrested, but only 20 held for trial in Philadelphia, and only two were convicted (eventually pardoned).

Other accounts describe the indictment of 24 men for high treason. Most of the accused had eluded capture, so only ten men stood trial for treason in federal court. Of these, only Philip Wigle (Note: Sources show a variety of spellings for his surname, including Vigol and Wigal.) and John Mitchell were convicted. Wigle had beaten up a tax collector and burned his house; Mitchell was a simpleton who had been convinced by David Bradford to rob the U.S. mail. These, the only two convicted of treason and sentenced to death by hanging, were later pardoned by President Washington. Pennsylvania state courts were more successful in prosecuting lawbreakers, securing numerous convictions for assault and rioting.

=== Aaron Burr treason trial ===
The most famous treason trial, that of Aaron Burr in 1807, resulted in acquittal. In 1807, on a charge of treason, Burr was brought to trial before the United States Circuit Court at Richmond, Virginia. The only physical evidence presented to the grand jury was General James Wilkinson's so-called letter from Burr, which proposed the idea of stealing land in the Louisiana Purchase. The trial was presided over by Chief Justice of the United States John Marshall, acting as a circuit judge. Since no witnesses testified, Burr was acquitted in spite of the full force of Jefferson's political influence thrown against him. Immediately afterward, Burr was tried on a misdemeanor charge and was again acquitted.

Burr was accused of attempting to use his international connections and support from a cabal of American planters, politicians, and United States Army officers to establish an independent country in the old federal Southwest Territory (1790–1796), south of the Ohio River, (future states of Kentucky, Tennessee and the future federal Territories of later Mississippi Territory (1798–1817), and adjacent Alabama Territory), and east of the Mississippi River and north of the southern coast along the Gulf of Mexico, or to invade / conquer the newly acquired Louisiana Purchase of 1803, west of the Mississippi River, later organized as the Louisiana Territory (1804–1812), then divided into future 18th state of Louisiana and upper / northern portion as Missouri Territory (1812–1821); or plotting against the northern parts of the colonial New Spain (later Mexico), still held by Spain; or against and seizing the Florida peninsula of the longtime Royal Spanish colony of Spanish Florida, (consisting of West Florida and East Florida), in the Americas / Western Hemisphere, part of the world-wide Spanish Empire since the early 16th century.

Burr's version was that he intended to farm 40,000 acres (160 km^{2}) in the Spanish Texas colonial province of the New Spain Viceroyalty which had been supposedly leased to him by the Spanish Crown.

In February 1807, former Vice President Burr was arrested on President Jefferson's orders and charged / indicted for treason, despite a lack of firm evidence. While Burr was ultimately acquitted of treason in a trial, due to the lack of detailed specificity in the 1787 text of the United States Constitution about any alleged crimes of treason, the fiasco and affair further destroyed his already faltering political career. Effigies of his likeness were hanged and burned throughout the country and the threat of additional charges from individual states forced him into exile overseas in Europe.

=== Taos Revolt executions ===
The Taos Revolt was a popular insurrection in January 1847 by Hispano and Pueblo allies against the United States' occupation of present-day northern New Mexico during the Mexican–American War. Provisional governor Charles Bent and several other Americans were killed by the rebels. In two short campaigns, United States troops and militia crushed the rebellion of the Hispano and Pueblo people. The New Mexicans, seeking better representation, regrouped and fought three more engagements, but after being defeated, they abandoned open warfare. Hatred of New Mexicans for the occupying American army combined with the oft-exercised rebelliousness of Taos residents against authority imposed on them from elsewhere were causes of the revolt. In the aftermath of the revolt the Americans executed at least 28 rebels. The Treaty of Guadalupe Hidalgo in 1848 guaranteed the property rights of New Mexico's Hispanic and Native American residents.

In August 1846, the territory of New Mexico, then under Mexican rule, fell to U.S. forces under Stephen Watts Kearny. Governor Manuel Armijo surrendered at the Battle of Santa Fe without firing a shot. When Kearny departed with his forces for California, he left Colonel Sterling Price in command of U.S. forces in New Mexico. He appointed Charles Bent as New Mexico's first territorial governor.

Many New Mexicans were unreconciled to Armijo's surrender; they also resented their treatment by U.S. soldiers, which Governor Bent described:

As other occupation troops have done at other times and places have done, they undertook to act like conquerors." Gov. Bent implored Price's superior, Col. Alexander Doniphan, "to interpose your authority to compel the soldiers to respect the rights of the inhabitants. These outrages are becoming so frequent that I apprehend serious consequences must result sooner or later if measures are not taken to prevent them.

An issue more significant than the galling daily insults was that many New Mexican citizens feared that their land titles, issued by the Mexican government, would not be recognized by the United States. They worried that American sympathizers would prosper at their expense. Following Kearny's departure, dissenters in Santa Fe plotted a Christmas uprising. When the plans were discovered by the US authorities, the dissenters postponed the uprising. They attracted numerous Native American allies, including Puebloan peoples, who also wanted to push the Americans from the territory.

On the morning of January 19, 1847, the insurrectionists began the revolt in Don Fernando de Taos, present-day Taos, New Mexico and nearby Taos Pueblo. They were led by Pablo Montoya, a Hispano with Taos Pueblo ancestry, and Tomás Romero from Taos Pueblo, also known as Tomasito (Little Thomas).

Romero led a Native American force to the house of Governor Charles Bent, where they broke down the door, shot Bent with arrows, and scalped him in front of his family. After they moved on, Bent was still alive. With his wife Ignacia and children, and the wives of friends Kit Carson and Thomas Boggs, the group escaped by digging through the adobe walls of their house into the one next door. When the insurgents discovered the party, they killed Bent, but left the women and children unharmed.

The rebel force killed and scalped several other government officials, along with others seen as related to the new US territorial government. Among those killed were Stephen Lee, acting county sheriff; Cornelio Vigil, prefect and probate judge; and J.W. Leal, circuit attorney. "It appeared," wrote Colonel Price, "to be the object of the insurrectionists to put to death every American and every Mexican who had accepted office under the American government."

The next day a large armed force of approximately 500 Hispanos and Puebloans attacked and laid siege to Simeon Turley's mill and distillery in Arroyo Hondo, several miles north of Taos. Charles Autobees, an employee at the mill, saw the men coming. He rode to Santa Fe for help from the occupying US forces. Eight to ten mountain men were left at the mill for defense. After a day-long battle, only two of the mountain men, John David Albert and Thomas Tate Tobin, survived. Both escaped separately on foot during the night. The same day Hispano insurgents killed seven or eight American traders who were passing through the village of Mora on their way to Missouri. At most 16 Americans were killed in both actions on January 20.

The US military moved quickly to quash the revolt; Col. Price led more than 300 US troops from Santa Fe to Taos, together with 65 volunteers, including a few New Mexicans, organized by Ceran St. Vrain, the business partner of the brothers William and Charles Bent. Along the way, the combined forces beat back a force of some 1,500 Hispanos and Puebloans at Santa Cruz de la Cañada and Embudo Pass. The insurgents retreated to Taos Pueblo, where they took refuge in the thick-walled adobe church.

During the ensuing battle, the US breached a wall of the church and directed cannon fire into the interior, inflicting many casualties and killing about 150 rebels. They captured 400 more men after close hand-to-hand fighting. Seven US troops died in the battle.

A separate force of US troops campaigned against the rebels in Mora. The First Battle of Mora, under Captain Israel R. Hendley, ended in a New Mexican strategic victory and Hendley's death. The Americans attacked again, under Capt. Jesse I. Morin, in the Second Battle of Mora and destroyed the village, which ended the Mora campaign of the revolt.

The next day, US officials ordered the execution of some of the captives in the plaza in a "drumhead court-martial", including the leader "Montojo" Pablo Montoya. Price then set up a military court in Taos to try more of the captured insurgents under civil law. He appointed as judges Joab Houghton, a close friend of Charles Bent; and Charles H. Beaubien, the father of Narcisse Beaubien, who had been killed on January 19. Both men had previously been appointed as judges to the New Mexico Territory Superior Court by the late Gov. Bent in August of the previous year. George Bent, Charles' brother, was elected foreman of the jury. The jury included Lucien Maxwell, a brother-in-law of Beaubien; and several friends of the Bents. Ceran St. Vrain served as court interpreter. Since the Anglo community in Taos was small, and several men had been killed by the rebels, the jury pool was extremely limited. The court was in session for fifteen days. The jury found 15 men guilty of murder and treason (under the new US rule), and the judges sentenced them to death.

An eyewitness, Lewis Hector Garrard, described the trial and events:

It certainly did appear to be a great assumption of the part of the Americans to conquer a country and then arraign the revolting inhabitants for treason. American judges sat on the bench, New Mexicans and Americans filled the jury box, and an American soldiery guarded the halls. Verily, a strange mixture of violence and justice-a strange middle ground between martial and common law. After an absence of a few minutes the jury returned with a verdict, "Guilty in the first degree". Five for murder, one for treason. Treason, indeed! What did the poor devil know about his new allegiance? ... I left the room, sick at heart. Justice! Out upon the word when its distorted meaning is a warrant for murdering those who defended to the last their country and their homes.

On April 9, the US forces hanged six of the convicted insurgents in the Taos plaza; all but one were convicted of murder, with the other being hanged of treason. This was the first execution by hanging in the Taos Valley. Two weeks later, the US forces executed five more. In all, the US hanged at least 28 men in Taos in response to the revolt. A year later, the United States Secretary of War reviewed the case. He said that the one man hanged for treason, Hipolito "Polo" Salazar, might have been wrongfully convicted. The Supreme Court of the United States agreed. All other convictions were affirmed.

=== Civil War ===
During the American Civil War, treason trials were held in Indianapolis against Copperheads for conspiring with the Confederacy against the United States. In addition to treason trials, the federal government passed new laws that allowed prosecutors to try people for the charge of disloyalty.

Various legislation was passed, including the Conspiracies Act of July 31, 1861. Because the law defining treason in the constitution was so strict, new legislation was necessary to prosecute defiance of the government. Many of the people indicted on charges of conspiracy were not taken to trial, but instead were arrested and detained.

In addition to the Conspiracies Act of July 31, 1861, in 1862, the federal government went further to redefine treason in the context of the civil war. The act that was passed is entitled "An Act to Suppress Insurrection; to punish Treason and Rebellion, to seize and confiscate the Property of Rebels, and for other purposes". It is colloquially referred to as the "second Confiscation Act". The act essentially lessened the punishment for treason. Rather than have death as the only possible punishment for treason, the act made it possible to give individuals lesser sentences.

William Bruce Mumford was the only person formally executed for treason during the Civil War. On April 25, 1862, as Union Navy ships approached Confederate New Orleans, Commodore David Farragut ordered two officers to send a message to Mayor John T. Monroe requesting removal of Confederate flags from the United States Custom House (New Orleans), New Orleans Mint, and New Orleans City Hall at the Gallier Hall building, and the replacement of Confederate flags with U.S. flags. Monroe refused, claiming it was beyond his jurisdiction. On April 26, Capt. Henry W. Morris sent ashore Marines from the USS Pocahontas to raise the U.S. flag over the mint. Morris did so without any order from Farragut, who was still trying to receive an official surrender from the mayor.

As the Marines raised the flag, a number of locals gathered around in anger. The Marines told them that the Pocahontas would fire on anyone attempting to remove the flag. However, a group of seven individuals, including Mumford, decided to remove the flag from the mint. The Pocahontas fired and Mumford was injured by a flying piece of brick. With cheers from local onlookers, he carried the flag to the mayor at city hall, but onlookers tore at it as he walked, reducing it to a stub.

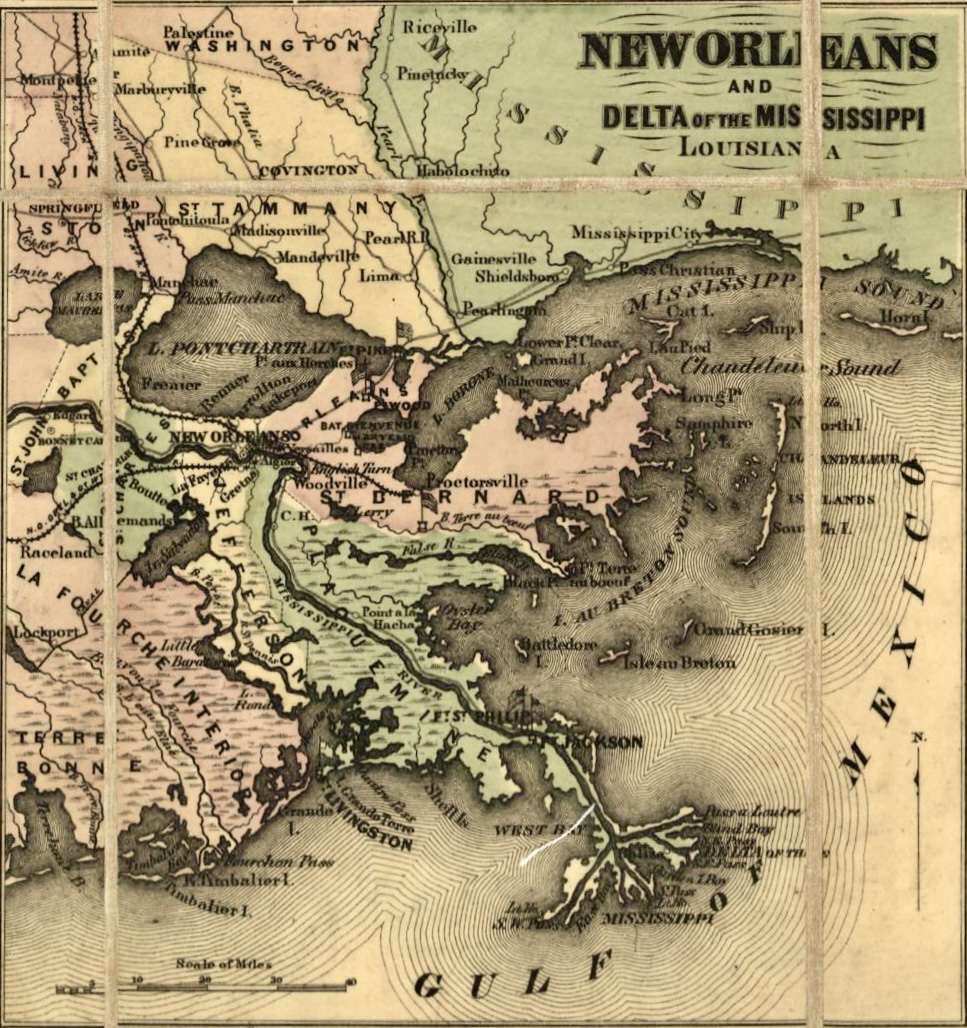
Port of New Orleans and Mississippi delta circa 1862

Three days later Union Army Maj. Gen. Benjamin Butler, the commander of the Union ground forces, heard about the incident and decided to arrest and punish Mumford. He said he spotted Mumford wearing a piece of the flag during a speech by Monroe at the St. Charles Hotel. Butler decided that Mumford had to be punished.

When the Union Army occupied the city on May 1, Mumford was arrested and charged with "high crimes and misdemeanors against the laws of the United States, and the peace and dignity thereof and the Law Martial." On May 30, he was tried before a military tribunal and convicted, even though there was no clear attempt to determine whether the city was actually occupied when the event occurred.

On June 5, Butler issued the following Special Order No. 70:

William B. Mumford, a citizen of New Orleans, having been convicted before a military commission of treason and an overt act thereof, tearing down the United States flag from a public building of the United States, after said flag was placed there by Commodore Farragut, of the United States Navy: It is ordered that he be executed according to sentence of said military commission on Saturday, June 7, inst., between the hours of 8 a.m. and 12 a.m. under the directions of the provost-marshal of the District of New Orleans, and for so doing this shall be his sufficient warrant.

On June 7, just before noon, Mumford was taken to be hanged in the courtyard of the mint itself, a place that Butler had decided "according to the Spanish custom" would be the ideal place. Many people came to the spot, and Mumford was allowed to give a final speech in which he spoke of his patriotism for the Confederacy and his love for what he considered the true meaning of the U.S. flag, a symbol he had fought under in the Seminole Wars and the Mexican–American War.

=== Reconstruction ===
After the Civil War the question was whether the United States government would make indictments for treason against leaders of the Confederate States of America, as many people demanded. Jefferson Davis, the President of the Confederate States, was indicted and held in prison for two years. The indictments were dropped on February 11, 1869, following the blanket amnesty noted below. When accepting Lee's surrender of the Army of Northern Virginia, at Appomattox Courthouse, in April 1865, Gen. Ulysses S. Grant assured all Confederate soldiers and officers a blanket amnesty, provided they returned to their homes and refrained from any further acts of hostility, and subsequently other Union generals issued similar terms of amnesty when accepting Confederate surrenders. All Confederate officials received a blanket amnesty issued by President Andrew Johnson on Christmas Day, 1868.

=== World War II ===
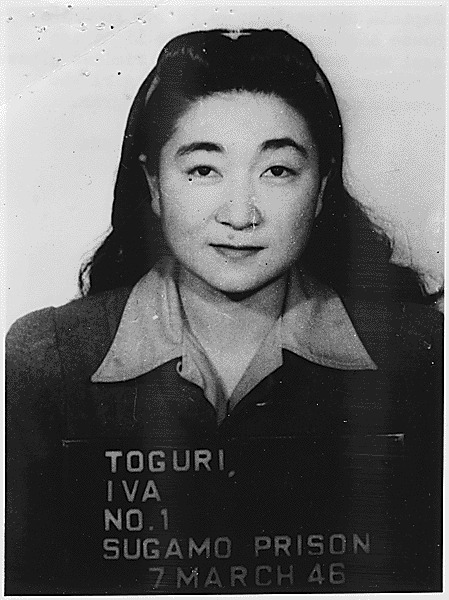
Iva Toguri, known as Tokyo Rose, was tried for treason after World War II for her broadcasts to American troops.

During the war several US citizens living in Europe were accused of treason for broadcasting Nazi propaganda. On July 26, 1943, Robert Henry Best, Douglas Chandler, Fred W. Kaltenbach, Edward Leo Delaney, Constance Drexel, Jane Anderson, Max Otto Koischwitz, and Ezra Pound had been indicted in absentia by a grand jury in Washington, D.C. on charges of treason. Only Best and Chandler would later be tried and convicted of treason after the war. The rest either had the charges dropped due to a lack of evidence or dismissed due to other circumstances (Koischwitz died in a Berlin hospital in 1944, Kaltenbach reported died while in Soviet custody, and Pound (accused of being involved in Nazi and Italian Fascist propaganda) was found unfit to stand trial.

Mildred Gillars, a German-American, along with Rita Zucca was nicknamed "Axis Sally" for broadcasting Axis propaganda (Zucca, an Italian-American, had renounced her US citizenship and it was decided not to indict her for treason, but in 1946 she was convicted by an Italian military tribunal on charges of collaboration and was released nine months later after the Italian government declared a general amnesty for collaborators). In 1949 Gillars was convicted on one count of treason. She was sentenced to 10 to 30 years in prison. She was released on June 10, 1961.

In 1949, Iva Toguri D'Aquino was convicted of treason for wartime Radio Tokyo broadcasts (under the name of "Tokyo Rose") and sentenced to ten years, of which she served six. As a result of prosecution witnesses having lied under oath, she was pardoned in 1977.

In 1952, Tomoya Kawakita, a Japanese-American dual citizen was convicted of treason and sentenced to death for having worked as an interpreter at a Japanese POW camp and having mistreated American prisoners. He was recognized by a former prisoner at a department store in 1946 after having returned to the United States. The sentence was later commuted to life imprisonment and a $10,000 fine. He was released and deported in 1963.

=== Cold War and after ===
The Cold War saw frequent talk linking treason with support for Communist-led causes. The most memorable of these came from Senator Joseph McCarthy, who used rhetoric about the Democrats as guilty of "twenty years of treason". As chosen chair of the Senate Permanent Investigations Subcommittee, McCarthy also investigated various government agencies for Soviet spy rings; however, he acted as a political fact-finder rather than a criminal prosecutor. The Cold War period saw no prosecutions for explicit treason, but there were convictions and even executions for conspiracy to commit espionage on behalf of the Soviet Union, such as in the Julius and Ethel Rosenberg case.

On October 11, 2006, the United States government charged Adam Yahiye Gadahn for videos in which he appeared as a spokesman for al-Qaeda and threatened attacks on American soil. He was killed on January 19, 2015, in an unmanned aircraft (drone) strike in Waziristan, Pakistan.

== State ==
Constitutionally, U.S. citizens who live in a state owe allegiance to at least two government entities: the United States of America and their state of legal residence. They can therefore potentially commit treason against either, or against both. At least 14 people have been charged with treason against various states; at least six were convicted, five of whom were executed. It has often been discussed, both legally and in matter of policy, if states should punish treason.

Four of the 13 colonies had enacted treason statutes by 1800, and four more had done so by 1820. The remaining five colonies had treason laws by 1862. In 2013, 43 states had treason laws, although 21 of them define this crime solely in their constitutions.

=== Alabama ===
Definition: The constitution of Alabama defines treason in similar terms to the United States Constitution.

Penalty: Not less than 10 years and not more than 99 years' imprisonment (eligible for parole after lesser of one-half of sentence or 15 years) or life imprisonment (eligible for parole after 10 years).

A treason conviction also results in loss of voting rights for life without the possibility of voting restoration.

=== Arkansas ===
Definition: Arkansas legislation defines treason similarly to the United States Constitution, limiting it to "levying war against the state" or giving "aid and comfort" to the enemies of the state. Also similarly, conviction requires the testimony of two witnesses to the same overt act, or confession in open court.

Penalty: Death, or life imprisonment without the possibility of parole (eligible for parole after 30 years if the defendant was under 18).

=== California ===
Definition: Treason against the state of California is defined similarly to the United States Constitution. The California Constitution states that "treason against the State consists only in levying war against it, adhering to its enemies, or giving them aid and comfort. A person may not be convicted of treason except on the evidence of two witnesses to the same overt act or by confession in open court." This is reiterated in Section 37 of the California Penal Code.

Penalty: Death, or life imprisonment without the possibility of parole.

=== Colorado ===
Penalty: Life imprisonment without the possibility of parole.

=== Delaware ===
Definition: The constitution of Delaware defines treason in similar terms to the United States Constitution.

=== Florida ===
Penalty: Not less than 5.5 years and not more than 30 years' imprisonment (minimum sentencing guidelines). “In cases of treason the governor may grant reprieves until adjournment of the regular session of the legislature convening next after the conviction, at which session the legislature may grant a pardon or further reprieve; otherwise the sentence shall be executed.”

=== Georgia ===
Penalty: Death, or by imprisonment for life or for not less than 15 years.

=== Idaho ===
The state constitution of Idaho specifically disallows gubernatorial respite or reprieve for a conviction for treason.

=== Illinois ===
Penalty: Not less than 6 years and not more than 30 years' imprisonment.

==== Joseph Smith and Hyrum Smith ====
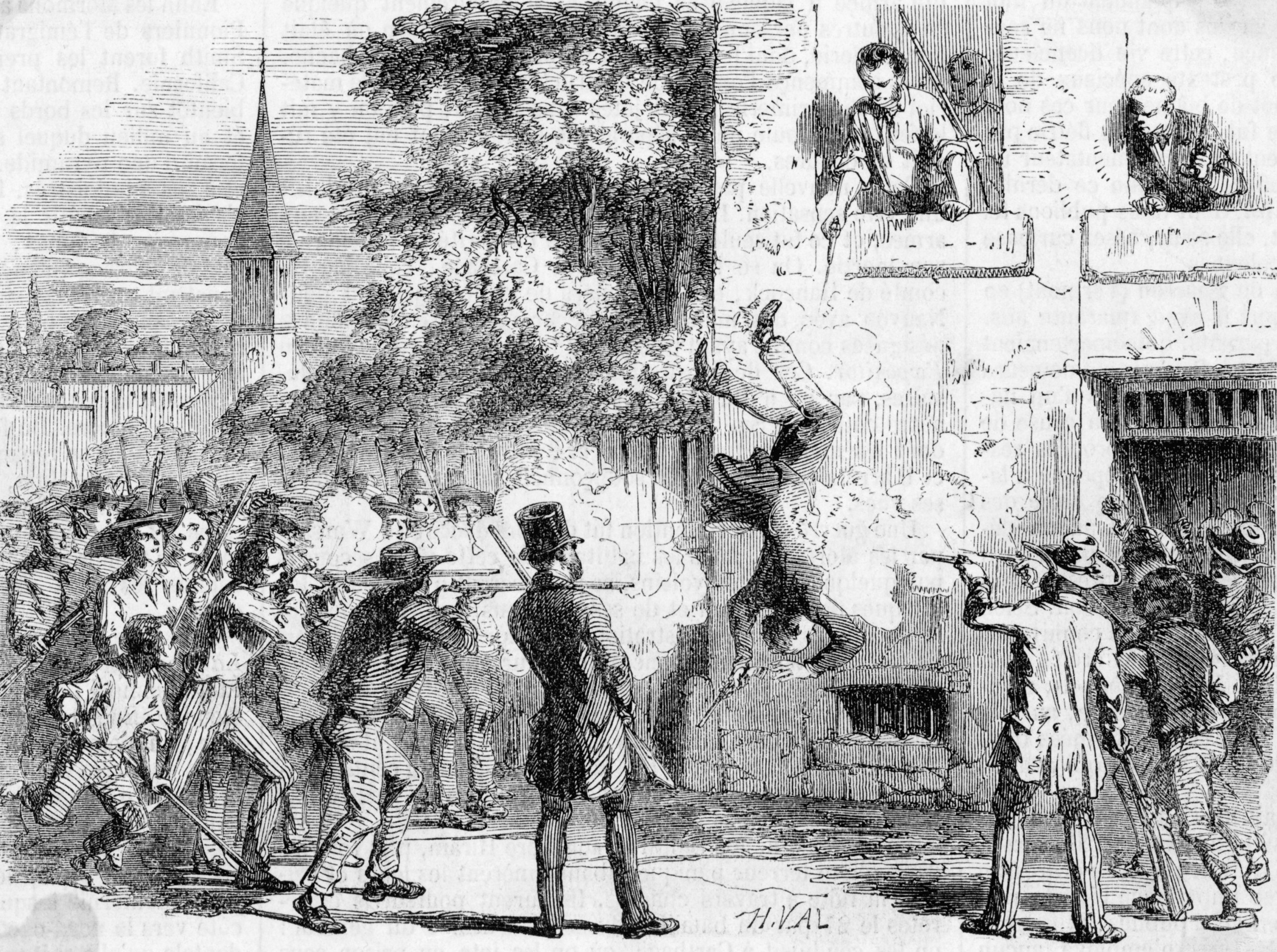
Death of Joseph Smith while awaiting trial for treason against Illinois

After escaping custody on charges of treason against Missouri and fleeing to Illinois, Joseph Smith and Hyrum Smith were charged with treason in Illinois, which at that time was a capital offense. Augustine Spencer swore out a warrant alleging that the Smith brothers had committed treason by "calling out the Legion to resist the force under the command of the Governor". On June 24, 1844, a warrant was issued charging that "Joseph Smith, late of the county aforesaid, did, on or about the nineteenth day of June. A.D. 1844, at the county and state aforesaid, commit the crime of treason against the government and people of the State of Illinois." (Ludlow, pp. 1346–1348)

Bail could not be granted for a charge of treason, so Smith was placed in jail where he was accompanied by his brother, Hyrum Smith, and other associates. On June 27, Smith and Hyrum were killed by a mob in jail while they were awaiting trial. (Ludlow, p. 860)

=== Louisiana ===
Penalty: Death, or life imprisonment. In Louisiana, all life imprisonment sentences exclude the possibility of parole.

=== Maine ===
Definition: The state constitution of Maine defines treason in similar terms to the United States Constitution.

=== Massachusetts ===
Penalty: Life imprisonment with the possibility of parole after serving not less than 15 years and not more than 25 years.

=== Michigan ===
Penalty: Life imprisonment.

=== Minnesota ===
Penalty: Life imprisonment with the possibility of parole after serving 17 years.

=== Mississippi ===
Penalty: Death or life imprisonment.

=== Missouri ===
Definition: Treason is defined in the constitution of the State of Missouri.

Penalty: Not less than 10 years and not more than 30 years' imprisonment (eligible for parole after serving one-half of sentence) or life imprisonment (eligible for parole after serving 30 years).

==== Joseph Smith and others ====
Joseph Smith and five others were charged with treason under Missouri law in 1838, spending over five months in prison, but escaped while awaiting trial. Joseph Smith and Hyrum Smith were later charged with treason against Illinois (above).

=== Nevada ===
Penalty: Not less than 2 years and not more than 10 years' imprisonment (if imprisonment is imposed).

=== New York ===
Penalty: 15–40 years in prison or Life imprisonment and a $100,000 fine. Though treason doesn't have a New York Penal Law Statute, it is punished as a class A-1 felony.

==== Mark Lynch, Aspinwall Cornell, and John Hagerman ====
During the War of 1812, Mark Lynch, Aspinwall Cornell, and John Hagerman sold supplies to British ships. However, the court dismissed the indictments because it was deemed the war was against the United States and not the state of New York.

=== North Carolina ===
Article I, Section 29, of the State Constitution is similar to Article III, Section 3 of the United States Constitution, limiting the legal definition of "treason" to levying war against the State or giving "aid and comfort" to the enemies of the State. Conviction requires two witnesses to the act itself, or a confession in open court.

==== John Sevier ====
John Sevier, then governor of the State of Franklin and later the first governor of the State of Tennessee, was charged with treason against the State of North Carolina in October 1788. After being transported to North Carolina, he was freed. The charge was never brought to trial.

=== North Dakota ===
Penalty: Not more than 20 years' imprisonment.

=== Oregon ===
Penalty: Life imprisonment with the possibility of parole after serving 25 years.

=== Pennsylvania ===
In 1892, after the Homestead strikes, Hugh O'Donnell and others were indicted for treason, .

=== Rhode Island ===
Penalty: Life imprisonment with the possibility of parole after serving 20 years.

==== Thomas Dorr ====
Thomas Wilson Dorr was convicted of treason against Rhode Island in 1844 for leading a rebellion against the state government, and sentenced to life imprisonment. Dorr served twelve months of his sentence. He was released in 1845 after the Rhode Island state legislature passed an Act of General Amnesty. In January 1854 the legislature passed an act annulling the verdict of the Rhode Island Supreme Court.

=== South Carolina ===
Penalty: Death or not more than 30 years' imprisonment (if committed during time of war) or not more than 20 years' imprisonment (if not committed during time of war).

=== South Dakota ===
Definition: The state constitution of South Dakota defines treason in similar terms to the United States Constitution.

=== Tennessee ===
Tennessee has repealed its treason law. However, a person convicted of treason can never be eligible to vote in Tennessee.

=== Texas ===
Penalty: Not less than 1 year and not more than 20 years' imprisonment.

=== Vermont ===
Definition: levying war or conspiring to levy war against the state, or adhering to the enemy. This definition, in Title 13, Chapter 75, § 3401 of Vermont Statutes, echoes the definition found in the United States Constitution.

Penalty: 25 years to life and up to $50,000 in fines.

=== Virginia ===
Penalty: Not less than 20 years' imprisonment or life imprisonment with the possibility of parole after serving 15 years (if imprisonment is imposed).

==== Raid on Harper's Ferry ====
John Brown was charged with treason against the Commonwealth of Virginia, along with conspiracy and first-degree murders after he led his raid on Harper's Ferry in 1859. In Virginia v. John Brown, he was found guilty on all three charges and hanged. Edwin Coppie (also known as Edwin Coppock) and Aaron Dwight Stevens were also charged, convicted, and hanged for treason against the Commonwealth of Virginia and other crimes. The charges of treason against John Anthony Copeland Jr. and Shields Green were dropped, since their lawyer argued successfully that since they were not citizens of the United States, according to the Dred Scott decision, they could not commit treason; they were convicted and hanged for other crimes. Albert Hazlett and John E. Cooke were charged with treason against the Commonwealth of Virginia and found not guilty of treason, but were convicted of other crimes.

=== Washington ===
Definition: The state constitution and statutory law of Washington define treason in similar terms to the United States Constitution, except that adhering to enemies and giving them aid are distinct forms of treason, not elements of a single form.

Penalty: Life imprisonment with the possibility of parole after serving 20 years, or any term of years. Treason is a "Class A" felony under sentencing guidelines, and current guidelines provide for a maximum sentence of life in prison and/or a $50,000 fine.

=== West Virginia ===
Penalty: Life imprisonment with the possibility of parole after serving 10 years or not less than 3 years and not more than 10 years' imprisonment (latter sentence able to be imposed at discretion of jury or court if defendant pleads guilty).

=== Wisconsin ===
Penalty: Life imprisonment with or without the possibility of parole (eligible in 20 years, if sentenced to life with parole).

== Tribal law ==
While treason is a criminal matter under federal and state laws, it may be considered a civil matter under tribal law. The U.S. federal government recognizes tribal nations as "domestic dependent nations". Tribal sovereignty is a form of parallel sovereignty within the U.S. constitutional framework, constrained by but not subordinate to other sovereign entities. The Indian Civil Rights Act limits sentences for crimes by tribal courts to no more than one year in jail and a $5,000 fine.

There is at least one case of punishment for treason under tribal law. In 1992, the Tonawanda Band of Seneca convicted several members of treason, stripped their tribal membership, and sentenced them to permanent banishment from the Tonawanda Reservation for attempting to overthrow the traditional government.

== See also ==
- Article Three of the United States Constitution

== Sources ==
- Oaks, Dallin H.; Hill, Marvin S. (1975). Carthage Conspiracy: The Trial of the Accused Assassins of Joseph Smith. Urbana, IL: University of Illinois Press. ISBN 0-252-00554-6.
