= John Fitzgerald (soldier) =

American soldier born in 1817

John Fitzgerald was an American soldier, born in Cook County, Illinois in about 1817. He fought at the Siege of Pueblo de Taos, February 3–5, 1847, during the Taos Revolt. Following that fight, on February 8, he assassinated "Tomascito" Romero, one of the leaders of the revolt.

He enlisted in Company C of Kearney's 1st Dragoons on August 6, 1844, and was described as, "27 years old, 5 feet 9 inches tall, with brown hair, dark eyes and fair complexion." He moved west with the army during the Mexican–American War in 1846. He was a member of Captain John Burgwin's dragoons and would have taken part in the Battle of Embudo Pass. During the siege of Taos Pueblo, "Burgwin's dismounted dragoons were ordered to charge through galling fire from the loopholes and secure lodgment against the west wall of the church." Eventually a rupture in the walls was created, where the "first two Americans who entered the breach fell dead, the third was unhurt, the fourth killed, and Fitz (Fitzgerald) was the fifth."

As part of the surrender agreement, the pueblos agreed to turn over a few of the leaders of the revolt and one of them, Tomás Romero, was jailed in Taos. The American soldiers were given free access to the prisoner and on February 8, Fitzgerald entered the jail, pulled out a pistol and shot Romero, killing him instantly. "For this cold-blooded act" he was immediately apprehended and was locked up in a windowless room. That night, after complaining about the cold, he was supplied with enough fire wood that he was able to create a pile that allowed him to remove enough of the ceiling that he could crawl through and escape. He returned to his unit where he received some supplies and from there he headed north from Santa Fe, eventually reaching Colorado where he met up with Ceran St. Vrain and Lewis Garrard, the latter of whom wrote one of the surviving accounts about Fitzgerald. From there he disappears from history, though he was given a dishonorable discharge from the army in Albuquerque, New Mexico on March 18, 1847. There appears to have been no attempt made to bring him to justice for murdering Romero.

== Motivation ==
Fitzgerald explained to Gerrard after the killing of Romero that he did it because "his brother having been murdered by Salazar while a prisoner in the Texas expedition against Santa Fe, he swore vengeance and entered the service with the hope of accomplishing it." Durand (who identified who the murderer "Fitzgerald" was) examined this claim and discovered that there was an Archibald Fitzgerald who died during the Texas Santa Fe expedition.
