= Thomas Tate Tobin =

American adventurer

Tom Tobin
- Born: May 1, 1823; St. Louis, Missouri
- Died: May 15, 1904 (aged 81); Fort Garland, Costilla County, Colorado, United States
- Resting place: Mac Mullan Cemetery Blanca, Costilla County, Colorado, USA
- Occupations: Mountain man, adventurer, US Army scout, bounty hunter
- Spouse: Pascuala Bernal

Thomas Tate Tobin (May 1, 1823 – May 15, 1904) was an American adventurer, tracker, trapper, mountain man, guide, US Army scout, and occasional bounty hunter. Tobin explored much of southern Colorado, including the Pueblo area. He associated with men such as Kit Carson, "Uncle Dick" Wootton, Ceran St. Vrain, Charley Bent, John C. Fremont, "Wild Bill" Hickok, William F. Cody, and the Shoup brothers. Tobin was one of only two men to escape alive from the siege of Turley's Mill and Distillery during the Taos Revolt. In later years he was sent by the Army to track down and kill the notorious Felipe Espinosa and his nephew, Jose Vincente Espinosa; Tobin returned to Ft. Garland with their heads in a sack.

== Biography ==
Thomas Tate Tobin was born in St. Louis, Missouri, on May 1, 1823, to Bartholomew Tobin, an Irish immigrant, and Sarah Autobees. Sarah, believed to have been a Lenape, had been widowed before marrying Tobin. She brought her son Charles Autobees (later Autobee) into the marriage. A year later, the couple had a daughter Catherine together.

=== Early life ===
In 1828, Charles Autobees, then 16 years old, went west to work as a beaver trapper. He returned to St. Louis in 1837. That year, his half-brother Tom Tobin, then 14 years old, left with Charles and his colleague Ceran St. Vrain to return to Taos. Tom worked as a trapper and scout at Bent's Fort and in Taos. Along with his brother, Tobin worked at Simeon Turley's store, mill, and distillery at Arroyo Hondo. He accompanied his brother Charles on trips to deliver supplies and whiskey to trappers in trade for furs. The men took the pelts to St. Louis to trade for more supplies for Turley's store. Autobees and Tobin made regular stops in places such as Fort Jackson, Fort Lupton, Bent's Fort, and El Pueblo.

== Marriage and family ==
By 1846, Tom had married Pascuala Bernal. They lived in Arroyo Hondo, near Taos. He continued working for Turley, and delivered dispatches to Fort Leavenworth for Gen. Stephen Kearny.

=== The Taos Revolt ===
On the morning of January 19, 1847, insurrectionists opposed to American rule began a revolt in Don Fernando de Taos (present-day Taos, New Mexico). They were led by Pablo Montoya, a Mexican, and Tomás Romero, a Pueblo also known as "Tomasito" (Little Tomas).

The Pueblo, led by Romero, went to the home of Governor Charles Bent, broke down the door, shot Bent several times with arrows, and scalped him in front of his wife and children. They murdered and scalped several other government officials. Among them were Stephen Lee, acting county sheriff; Cornelio Vigil, prefect and probate judge; and J.W. Leal, circuit attorney.

The next day a large force of approximately 500 Mexicans and Pueblo attacked and laid siege to Simeon Turley's Mill and Distillery, where Autobees and Tobin were working. Seeing the crowd approach, Autobees rode to Santa Fe to inform the occupying American forces about the revolt and to try to get help, leaving eight to ten mountain men, including his brother Tom, to defend the mill. After a day-long battle, only two of the men, Johnny Albert and Tobin, survived; they escaped the burning mill separately on foot during the confusion of night fighting.

After his escape, Tobin and Autobees served as scouts for a company led by Capt. Ceran St. Vrain, to find and capture the insurrectionists. Those perpetrators who were not killed in battle were tried and mostly hanged. Romero was assassinated while in jail by a US dragoon, John Fitzgerald.

=== Scout, guide, Indian fighter ===
In 1847, Tobin farmed on land bordering the San Carlos River southeast of El Pueblo, selling his crops to Lt. Col. William Gilpin, who was camped with his troops near Bent's Fort. The next year, Gilpin asked Tobin to scout for him during a planned spring campaign against the Indians. Gilpin asked Tobin to serve as a courier, carrying dispatches from the Canadian River valley of Oklahoma to Bent's Fort.

Before the Civil War, Gwinn Harris Heap hired Tobin as a scout to guide an expedition to find a railroad route to California. Heap described Tobin as "having a reputation almost equal to Kit Carson's for bravery, dexterity with his rifle, and skill in mountain life."

In November 1868, Gen. Penrose appointed Tobin as chief scout on an Indian-hunting campaign. Other scouts hired were Tobin's half-brother Charles Autobee, and "Wild Bill" Hickok.

=== Felipe Espinosa ===
In 1858 Felipe Espinosa and his family moved to the San Luis Valley from New Mexico. Felipe and his younger brother Vivian Espinosa went on a killing spree beginning in 1863, murdering more than 30 Anglos in the area in retaliation for relatives killed in the Mexican–American War. A detachment of soldiers from Ft. Garland, as well as several posses, attempted to capture the brothers, but succeeded only in killing one brother (Vivian), who was quickly replaced by a nephew, Jose Vincente Espinosa. Eventually, Colonel Sam Tappan, the commanding officer of Ft. Garland, requested Tobin's help in bringing the Espinosas' reign of terror to an end. He provided Tobin with a detachment of fifteen soldiers, but Tobin left them at camp, as they made too much noise on the trail. Tobin tracked the Espinosas to a camp and shot them. He cut off their heads and carried them in a sack back to Ft. Garland as proof of his success. When asked by Tappan how his trip had gone, Tobin reportedly replied, "So-so", then rolled the heads out of the sack and across the floor. The government had posted a reward for several thousand dollars (Dead or Alive) for the Espinosas, but Tobin never collected the full amount. The governor of Colorado gave him a coat like Kit Carson's and the Army gave him a Henry rifle.

=== Billy Carson ===
In 1878, Tobin's daughter Pasqualia married William (Billy) Carson, a son of Kit Carson. Some years later, Tobin tried to stab Carson for abusing Pasqualia; the younger man hit Tobin in the head with a sledge hammer and shot him in the side. Tobin and his son-in-law apparently reconciled a few days later, but Tobin never fully recovered from the shooting. He did outlive Billy Carson, however.

== Sources ==
- Carter, Harvey Lewis; Kit Carson (1990). Dear Old Kit: The Historical Christopher Carson. University of Oklahoma Press. pp. 125, 152, 192. ISBN 0-8061-2253-6.
- Colorado Historical Society (2004). Grinstead; Fogelberg (eds.). Western Voices: 125 Years of Colorado Writing. Fulcrum Publishing. p. 50. ISBN 1-55591-531-0.
- Conard, Howard Louis; Dick Wooton (1980). Milo Milton Quaife (ed.). Uncle Dick Wootton. University of Nebraska Press. ISBN 0-8032-1408-1.
- Conner, Buck. "Thomas Tate Tobin". Archived from the original on May 12, 2006.
- Jones, Adam (December 14, 2010). "Felipe Espinosa".
- Field, Ron; Illus. Richard Hook (2003). Elite 91: US Army Frontier Scouts 1840-1921. Osprey Publishing. pp. 7, 8–9. ISBN 1-84176-582-1.
- Hewett, Edgar L. (2004). Campfire and Trail. Kessinger Publishing. pp. 44, 45, 46, 51. ISBN 1-4179-7649-7.
- Lecompte, Janet "Charles Autobees", featured in "Trappers of the Far West", Leroy R. Hafen, editor. 1972, Arthur H. Clark Company, reprint University of Nebraska Press, October 1983. ISBN 0-8032-7218-9
- McTighe, James (1989). Roadside History of Colorado. Johnson Books. pp. 340–341. ISBN 1-55566-054-1.
- Nash, Jay Robert (1994). Encyclopedia of Western Lawmen & Outlaws. Da Capo Press. pp. 122, 367. ISBN 0-306-80591-X.
- O'Brien, Christopher (1999). Enter the Valley: UFOs, Religious Miracles, Cattle Mutilations, and Other Unexplained Phenomena in the San Luis Valley. St. Martin's Press. pp. 40, 164. ISBN 0-312-96835-3.
- Perkins, James E. (1999). Tom Tobin: Frontiersman. Herodotus Press. ISBN 0-9675562-0-1. Book review and synopsis at Denver Post.
- Raher, Stephen (March 16, 2006). "Oral History of a Colorado Mountain Town". Voice of America. Archived from the original on December 16, 2008. Radio broadcast also available for download.
- William, Henry Frederick (1958). Thomas Tate Tobin. Henry. ASIN B0007HPY5W.
