= John David Albert =

American mountain man (1810–1899)

- John David Albert, circa 1895
- Born: May 24, 1810; Hagerstown, Washington County, Maryland
- Died: April 24, 1899 (aged 89); Montana
- Occupation(s): Frontiersman, hunter, fur trapper

John David Albert (May 24, 1810 – April 24, 1899) was an American mountain man.

== Early life ==
John David Albert was born in Hagerstown, Washington County, Maryland, and was baptized in St. Johns Evangelical Lutheran Church. Albert was orphaned in 1812 around the age of two. His father died in the War of 1812, and his mother soon after, leaving Albert to live with a sister in Harrisburg, Pennsylvania.

== Frontiersman ==
After working on a Mississippi keelboat in 1833, Albert went west in 1834 with a group of approximately sixty hunters to trap. He soon became part of the Western department of the American Fur Company at Fort Laramie. In 1836, he was sent to the South Platte area, where the weather trapped him for the winter on the Cache la Poudre. In the spring, he went to Fort William, later known as Bent's Fort, on the Arkansas River. From March to October 1838 he was employed at Fort Jackson by Peter Sarpy and Henry Fraeb.

In 1847 he was employed at Simeon Turley's Mill and Distillery about 12 miles (19 km) north of Taos at Arroyo Hondo. He was one of eight to ten mountain men who defended the mill in a siege by approximately 500 Mexicans and Indians during the Taos Revolt. Seeing the approaching mob, Charles Autobees rode to Santa Fe to get help. The remaining mountain men held off the attack into the night, when Albert and Autobees' half brother Thomas Tate Tobin escaped separately on foot in the confusion of the fighting. Albert and Tobin were the only two men to escape Turley's Mill alive. In three days, Albert walked 140 miles (230 km) to the trading post at Pueblo, through winter conditions with no coat, having escaped only with his weapons and shooting bag. Tobin walked to Santa Fe.

John David Albert later settled in the Taos Valley, marrying Juliana León, the daughter of Miguel Antonio León.

He carried mail out of the Spanish Peaks post office at Cuchara station, trapped on the Purgatory and Cucharas rivers, and is credited with building the fort at La Plaza de la Leones.

He was a close friend of Jim Baker, and co-led the parade of Denver's Festival of Mountain and Plain with Baker in 1895.

== Death ==
Albert survived three wives, all of whom were partially or fully Mexican and all of whom died while married to him, and fathered 21 children before his death in Montana. He is buried in the old Catholic Cemetery at Walsenburg, Colorado.
