= William Bruce Mumford =

Confederate-American executed for treason 1862

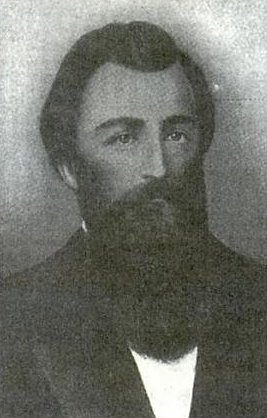
- Born: December 5, 1819; North Carolina, U.S.
- Died: June 7, 1862 (aged 42); New Orleans, Louisiana, U.S.
- Resting place: Greenwood Cemetery
- Known for: Being executed after tearing down an American flag during the U.S. Civil War
- Status: Executed by hanging
- Conviction: Treason
- Penalty: Death

William Bruce Mumford (December 5, 1819 – June 7, 1862) was a North Carolina native and resident of New Orleans, who tore down the U.S. flag raised over New Orleans after the city was captured by Union troops during the American Civil War. In response, Union Army Maj. Gen. Benjamin Butler, the commander of the Union ground forces, had Mumford court-martialed and executed for treason. He was the last person executed for treason against the United States.

== Biography ==
Mumford's life leading up to the incident which resulted in his execution was relatively unremarkable. A native of North Carolina, he owned no slaves, nor much of anything else, and had not volunteered to fight in the Civil War. However, he had been in the United States Army before secession. He was a noted gambler. He was married to Mary Mumford; after his death she never remarried.

== Flag incident ==
The American flag, as it would have appeared in 1862.

On April 25, 1862, as Union Navy ships approached Confederate New Orleans, Commodore David Farragut ordered two officers to send a message to Mayor John T. Monroe requesting removal of Confederate flags from the United States Custom House (New Orleans), New Orleans Mint, and New Orleans City Hall at the Gallier Hall building, and the replacement of Confederate flags with U.S. flags. Monroe refused, claiming it was beyond his jurisdiction. On April 26, Captain Henry W. Morris sent ashore Marines from the USS Pocahontas to raise the U.S. flag over the mint. Morris did so without any order from Farragut, who was still trying to receive an official surrender from the mayor.

As the Marines raised the flag, a number of locals gathered around in anger. The Marines told them that the Pocahontas would fire on anyone attempting to remove the flag. However, a group of seven individuals, including Mumford, decided to remove the flag from the mint. The Pocahontas fired and Mumford was injured by a flying piece of brick. With cheers from local onlookers, he carried the flag to the mayor at city hall, but onlookers tore at it as he walked, reducing it to a stub.

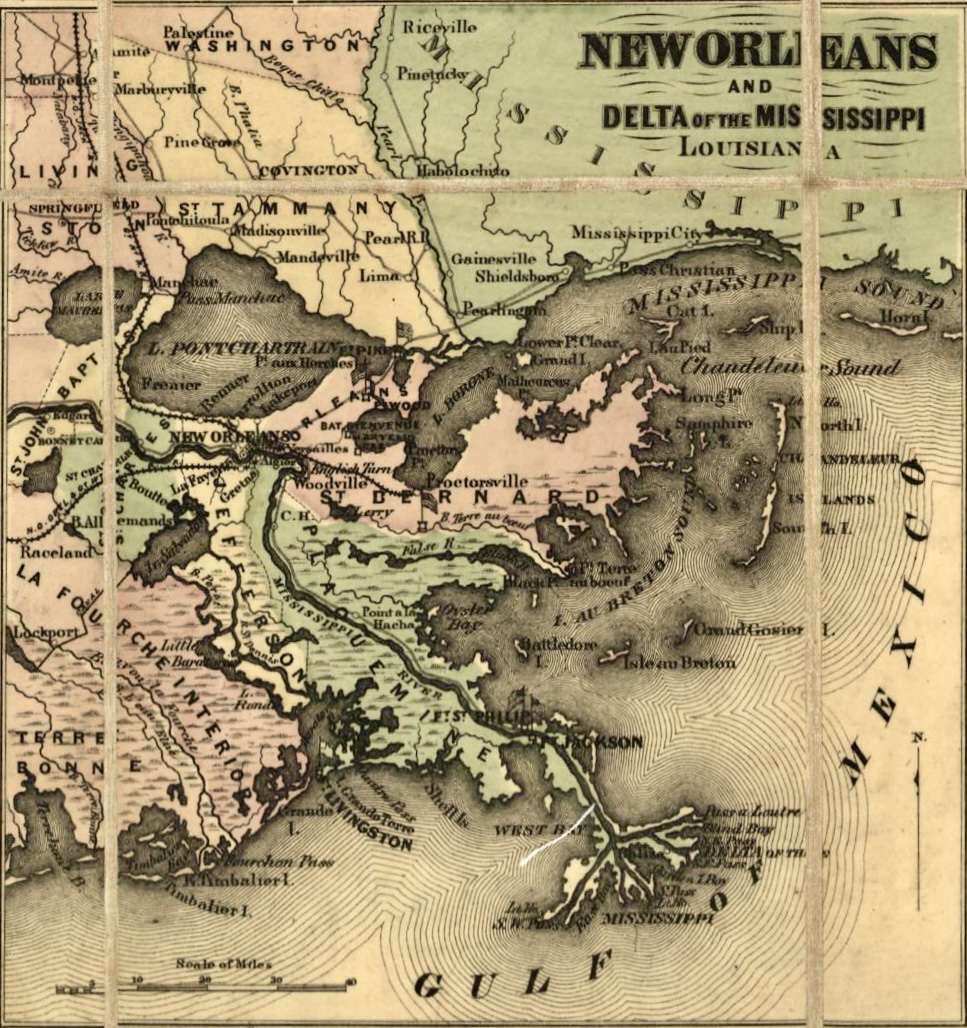
Port of New Orleans and Mississippi delta circa 1862

== Trial and execution ==
Three days later Union Army Maj. Gen. Benjamin Butler, the commander of the Union ground forces, heard about the incident and decided to arrest and punish Mumford. He said he spotted Mumford wearing a piece of the flag during a speech by Monroe at the St. Charles Hotel. Butler decided that Mumford had to be punished.

When the Union Army occupied the city on May 1, Mumford was arrested and charged with "high crimes and misdemeanors against the laws of the United States, and the peace and dignity thereof and the Law Martial." On May 30, he was tried before a military tribunal and convicted, but there was no clear attempt to determine whether the city was occupied when the event occurred.

On June 5, Butler issued the following Special Order No. 70:

William B. Mumford, a citizen of New Orleans, having been convicted before a military commission of treason and an overt act thereof, tearing down the United States flag from a public building of the United States, after said flag was placed there by Commodore Farragut, of the United States Navy: It is ordered that he be executed according to sentence of said military commission on Saturday, June 7, inst., between the hours of 8 a.m. and 12 a.m. under the directions of the provost-marshal of the District of New Orleans, and for so doing this shall be his sufficient warrant.

On June 7, just before noon, Mumford was taken to be hanged in the courtyard of the mint itself, a place that Butler had decided "according to the Spanish custom" would be the ideal place. Many people came to the spot, and Mumford was allowed to give a final speech in which he spoke of his patriotism for the Confederacy and his love for what he considered the true meaning of the U.S. flag, a symbol he had fought under in the Seminole Wars and the Mexican-American War.

== Aftermath ==
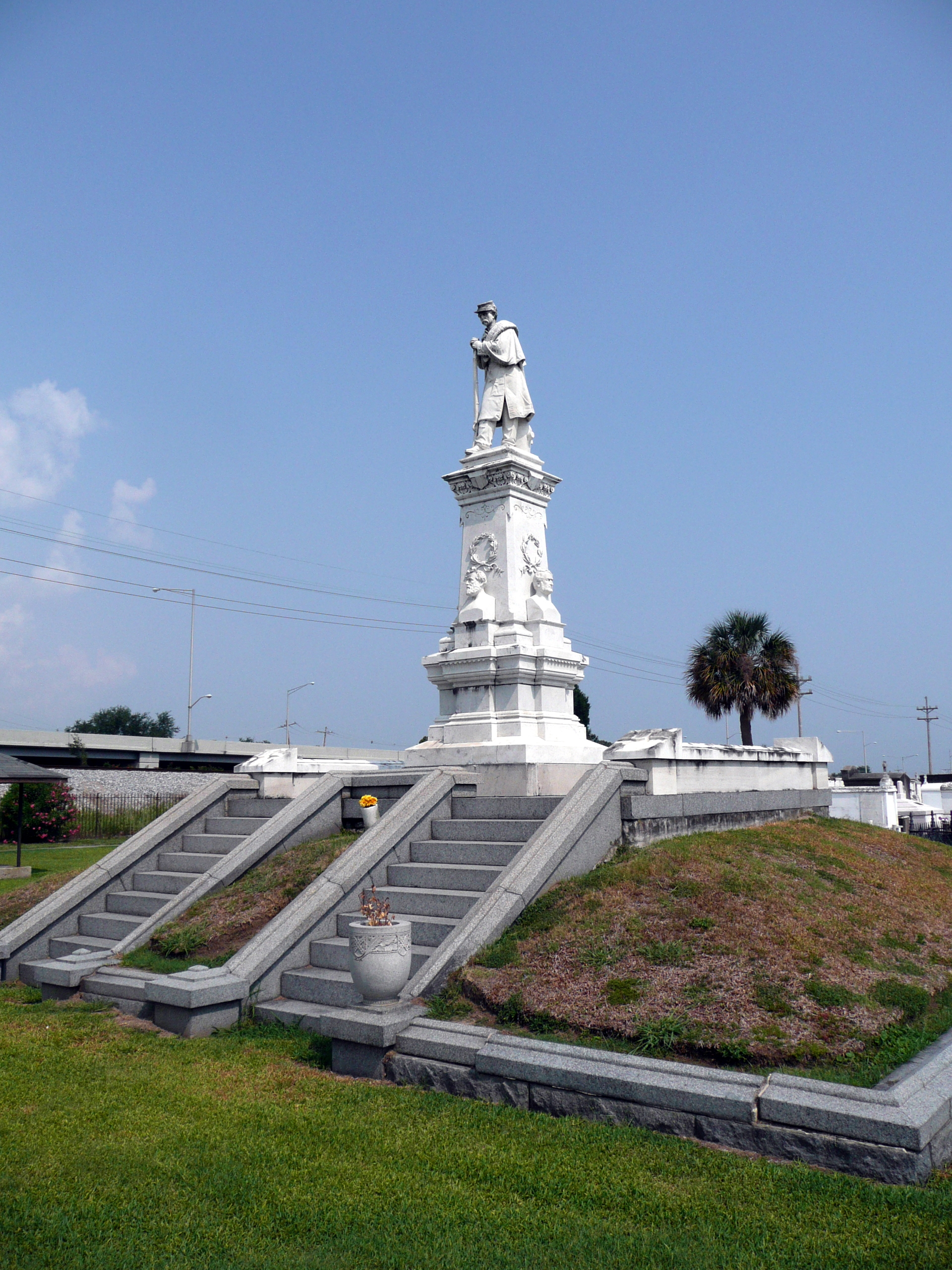
A Confederate monument in which William Mumford is buried at Greenwood Cemetery, New Orleans

After he was hanged, on June 18, Confederate Governor of Louisiana Thomas Overton Moore issued a statement declaring Mumford a hero and a model. Robert E. Lee demanded that Union General Henry Wager Halleck explain how execution could have occurred for a crime committed before New Orleans was occupied. Confederate President Jefferson Davis issued a proclamation stating that Benjamin Butler should be considered a criminal and worthy of hanging. Later on Butler assisted Mumford's wife and helped her find a job in Washington.

Mumford was buried in a vault in Cypress Grove Cemetery, New Orleans. In 1950, the Ladies' Memorial Association moved Mumford's remains to the base of the Confederate monument at Greenwood Cemetery, New Orleans. The association placed a small stone there that reads "William B. Mumford, Martyr to the Cause of the Confederacy, June 7, 1862, Aged 42 years."

== Legacy ==
Mumford's name has been mentioned with figures such as Abraham Lincoln, Elmer E. Ellsworth, John Pelham and Stonewall Jackson, which represent "martyred heroes and violent villains for both the North and South." In the South, Mumford was praised as a hero and a martyr, while conversely in the North, he was condemned as a coward and a treasonous thug. After his wife's death in 1912, the South Carolinian newspaper The Times and Democrat noted that just hearing the name Mumford in the South could still "stir the hearts of the older people with bitter memories of General Butler’s brutality and revengefulness."

At the Confederate Memorial Hall Museum, a piece of the flag that Mumford tore, the rope that he was hanged with, and a large image of him are on display.

== See also ==
- List of last executions in the United States by crime
- Susan Brownlow – involved in another American Civil War flag situation
- Barbara Fritchie – allegedly involved in another flag situation during the American Civil War
- New Orleans Massacre of 1866 feat. John Monroe
