= Felipe Espinosa =

Mexican-American serial killer

- Born: Felipe Nerio Espinosa c. 1827; Rio Arriba County, New Mexico Territory, U.S. or Veracruz, Mexico
- Died: 1863 (aged 35–36); Colorado, U.S.
- Cause of death: Gunshot and slit throat by Tom Tobin
- Body discovered: Fort Garland, Colorado
- Other name: The Axeman of Colorado
- Spouse: Maria Secundida Hurtado (m. 1854)
- Parent(s): Pedro Ignasio Espinosa (Father); Maria Gertrudes Cháves (Mother)
- Relatives: José Vivian Espinosa (brother); Julian Espinosa (cousin)
- Motive: A vision of the Virgin Mary to “kill and kill again until the blood of 600 Anglos had been spilt all over New Mexico”
- Criminal charge: First degree murder of 32 people

Details
- Victims: 32
- Date: Spring – fall 1863
- Country: U.S.
- State: Colorado
- Target: White settlers or Anglos

Felipe Nerio Espinosa (c. 1827–1863) was a Mexican-American murderer who killed an estimated 32 people in Colorado Territory throughout the spring and fall of 1863.

== Early life ==
Felipe Nerio Espinosa was probably born in what is today El Rito Unincorporated Community, Rio Arriba County, New Mexico Territory (at that time, Santa Fe de Nuevo México), although some sources cite his place of birth as Veracruz, Mexico. His parents were Pedro Ignacio Espinosa, who was born in Abiquiu, New Mexico, and Gertrudis Chavez. He had a brother named Vivian.

The Mexican census of 1845 from El Rito, New Mexico, lists several members of the Espinosa family, while the 1860 US Census lists a Felipe Nerio Espinosa living in Conejos, San Fernando Valley, Taos, New Mexico, with his wife, and two children, a girl of five and a son of two.

== Killing spree ==
There is no definitive reason as to why the Espinosa brothers (Felipe and Vivian) began their rampage but evidence suggests it was because the U.S. Army had been tasked with arresting the pair over alleged robberies in the area. When the two men did not give themselves up, one of their homes was burned and their property confiscated. The pair had ended up in American territory after the signing of the Treaty of Guadalupe Hidalgo in February 1848. It had ceded the area and its Hispanic settlers to the United States following the conclusion of Mexican–American War (1846–1848). In the decade that had followed the treaty, many Hispanic people had lost title to their lands because territory courts showed an inclination to settle land disputes in favor of White settlers.

Aided by Johnathan London, Espinosa began his murder spree in the thinly populated area of what is now Fremont County, Colorado. "The brothers' first victim was found in May 1863, his corpse mutilated and the heart hacked out of his chest. During that summer, twenty-five more people were attacked and killed in similar fashion."

Espinosa sent a letter to Territorial Governor John Evans stating his intention to murder 600 "gringos", if he and the other members of his gang were not granted pardons, some 5,000 acres (20 km^{2}) in Conejos County, and appointments in the 1st Colorado Volunteer Infantry Unit.

Lawmen, including Conejos County Sheriff Emmett Harding and 1st Colorado Volunteer Infantry Unit Commander S.B. Tappan, were dispatched to find Espinosa, but they met with little success. A posse out of Park County, Colorado finally managed to track the brothers southwest of Canon City, Colorado. Vivian was shot and killed in the ensuing gunfight but Felipe escaped. After hiding out for the remainder of the summer, Felipe recruited a 14-year-old nephew named Jose and resumed the rampage. Soon after, tracker Tom Tobin was enlisted by the U.S. Army to find the pair. In a matter of days, Tobin found the outlaws' camp and, in a brief gunfight, shot and killed both Espinosas. He took their heads back to Fort Garland, Colorado.

== See also ==
- List of serial killers in the United States
