= Turley Mill and Distillery Site =

- U.S. National Register of Historic Places
- Location within New Mexico Location within the United States
- Nearest city: Taos, New Mexico
- Coordinates: 36°32′23″N 105°37′19″W
- Area: 3 acres (1.2 ha)
- Built: c.1830
- NRHP reference No.: 78001833
- Added to NRHP: November 16, 1978

The Turley Mill and Distillery Site is a historic site on the Rio Hondo about 11 miles (18 km) north of Taos, New Mexico. It was a mill and distillery which served as the headquarters of Simeon Turley's commercial and manufacturing empire. Simeon Turley (1809–1847) and his brothers Stephen Turley (1786–1851) and Jesse B. Turley (1801–1861) transported goods from Franklin, Missouri to Taos via wagon train on the Santa Fe Trail. About 1827–1829 Simeon settled in Arroyo Hondo and established the mill and distillery as a popular trading post and "watering hole". Simeon was murdered in the Taos Revolt of January 1847 and the mill and distillery site was all but destroyed. Simeon Turley is buried in the Kit Carson Memorial Cemetery in Taos. The mill and distillery site was listed on the State of New Mexico Register of Cultural Properties in 1969 and on the National Register of Historic Places in 1978.

It is located in what is now Arroyo Hondo.

== The Structures ==
The primary structure was about 140 x 50 yards and took over a year to complete with more than 100 laborers. It was at least two stories tall plus a cellar, with the first floor consisting of basalt stone masonry and the second story adobe. The walls for each floor were about one yard thick and 13 feet tall. James Josiah Webb said that he knew of only three stores in New Mexico that had wooden plank floors and one of those was Turley's Mill and Distillery

The mill dam on the Rio Hondo was created by building a fitted-stone abutment from each side of the wall of the canyon bottom and filling it in with earth. High waters would wash the earth away leaving the abutment, thus lessening flooding. The earth was relatively easy to replace when the waters receded.

On the south side of the Rio Hondo on a bluff overlooking the large Turley Mill and Distillery was a long building housing the various employees, e.g., the coopers, the millers, the blacksmiths, the weavers, the farmers, the ranchers, etc. Nearby is the Taos Trapper's Trail leading north to Colorado and the Kiowa Trail leading east to the Texas panhandle .

Turley grew various crops for flour and meal in the long valley on both sides of the Rio Hondo. Wheat was the basis for the famous, strong whiskey, "Taos Lightning", produced at the distillery. Simeon also mined small quantities of gold on his property.

== Simeon Turley (1809–1847) ==
Simeon Turley, founder of the Turley Mill and Distillery, was born in Madison County, Kentucky to Benjamin Turley (1762–1812) and Nancy Ann Marllor (Noland) Turley (1765-?). Benjamin Turley had served as a private in the American War for Independence under Colonel Archibald Orme's Regiment, Middle Battalion, Montgomery County, Maryland.

Simeon's older brothers, Stephen Turley (1786–1851) and Jesse B. Turley (1801–1861) were instrumental in arranging Simeon's move from Kentucky to New Mexico. In 1811 Stephen and Jesse settled in the Lamine township of the Boone's Lick region in Missouri where they soon actively engaged in Santa Fe Trail commerce from Franklin, Missouri to Santa Fe and Taos. Stephen and Jesse are purported to have led an 1826 merchant caravan that carried 16-year-old Kit Carson, a longtime family friend, from Franklin, Missouri to Santa Fe, New Mexico. Simeon's role in the Santa Fe Trail commerce was that of setting up a trading post in New Mexico thus creating a steady flow of business for the Turley brothers to transport goods to and from Missouri. Accordingly, about 1830, Simeon established a home, trading post, mill, and distillery on the Rio Hondo. By all accounts, the site was hugely successful and was recently referred to as "the Walmart before Walmart". Plains Indian tribes would, for example, sell raw buffalo robes to Turley's Mill & Distillery where the robes were prepped for sale on the Santa Fe Trail trade caravan. "In 1843, Simeon Turley in Arroyo Hondo, New Mexico wrote to his brother Jesse in Arrow Rock, Missouri that he was shipping him '200 buffalo robes and a load of beaver.' "

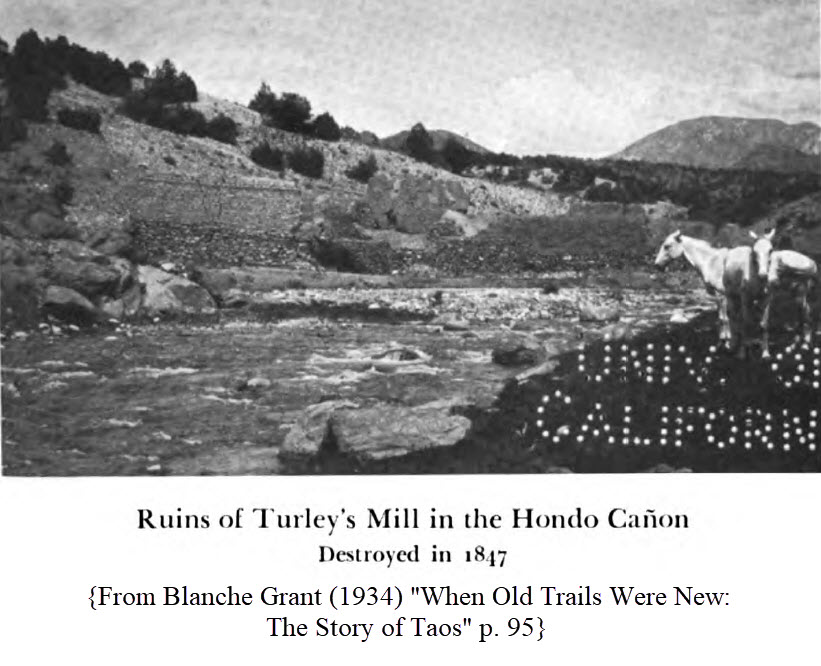
Ruins of Turley Mill and Distillery Destroyed in 1847 Revolt in Taos

Simeon was apparently well-liked by locals and traders and was described by George Ruxton, who had visited the distillery just a couple of days before it was destroyed, as one who would open up his granaries to the hungry and his purse to the poor. However, on January 20, 1847, the Taos Revolt shifted to Turley's Mill and Distillery which was besieged by about 500 Mexicans and Taos Puebloans. Eight to ten men were trapped inside the walls of the mill and distillery. Turley's Mill and Distillery was destroyed the following day. Simeon, who suffered from a bad leg since childhood had escaped the distillery at night only to be encountered a short distance away by a local friend who instead of getting help for Simeon, revealed Simeon's hiding spot to the insurgents who murdered him on January 21, 1847. Only a few of Turley's men successfully escaped the attack on the mill and distillery: John David Albert, who escaped on the night of the 20th and fled to Fort Bent; Thomas Tate Tobin; and, Charles Autobees who escaped before the insurgents arrived and rushed to Santa Fe to inform Colonel Sterling Price. Help did not arrive in time. Among those who died were the following mountain men: William Hatfield, Louis Tolque, Peter Roberts, Joseph Marshall, William Austin, and Albert Tarbush.

The site was never rebuilt by friends or family. Simeon and his common law wife Maria Rosita Vigil y Romero had seven children who were identified in his 1847 estate papers as: Maria Alvina, Maria Pabla, Jose Andres, Thomacito, Juan de Dios, Jose Manuel, and Jose Narsisco Vigil y Romero. Maria Rosita was granted $2098.50 and she and her named children were "granted all the rights titles and interest to all the land accumulating eleven hundred varas, likewise the houses, distilleries, mills…" Jesse Turley was the Legatus of the Estate and Charles H. Beaubien was the judge. They signed the estate settlement papers on October 11, 1847

== The whiskey trade ==
In 1830, the consumption of alcohol in the United States peaked at 7.1 gallons annually per capita. (By contrast, 21st century per capita alcohol consumption by Americans is about 2 gallons per year.) In the 1830s and 1840s, Turley's distillery was a large producer of the whiskey consumed in New Mexico and Colorado, especially by the Indian tribes. In 1835, the Cheyenne Indians who frequented Bent's Fort said that whiskey was first among the good things of life. The Anglo mountain men and traders and Hispanic residents of New Mexico were also large consumers of Turley's product, which was later called "Taos Lightning". Until the American conquest of New Mexico in 1846, Turley's distillery was outside the jurisdiction of the U.S.

In 1836, former mountain man Charles Autobees became Turley's traveling salesman. Autobees loaded two 10-gallon barrels of whiskey on each mule of a mule train and proceeded north from Taos through the San Luis Valley, crossed the Sangre de Cristo Mountains at La Veta Pass, and descended to the Great Plains. He traded the whiskey for buffalo robes and beaver pelts in the Arkansas and Platte river valleys, and sent the robes and pelts by wagon train to Missouri for them to be sold. The profits from the whiskey trade were large. John Brown at his trading post in the Greenwood Valley of Colorado bought whiskey for $2.25 per gallon and sold it for $1.00 per pint, a markup of more than 300 percent. Profit was even greater for trade with the Indian tribes because the whiskey was usually watered down. Turley became one of the richest men in New Mexico as a result of his whiskey and grain sales.

Attempts by the U.S. and Mexican governments to control the trade in alcohol were mostly ineffectual.
