= First Battle of Mora =

Coordinates: 35.974233°N 105.3296°W

- Part of the Taos Revolt; Mexican–American War
| Date | January 24, 1847 |
| Location | Mora, New Mexico |
| Result | Mexican tactical victory |

Belligerents
| United States | Mexico |

Commanders and leaders
| (United States) Capt. Israel R. Hendley † | (Mexico) unknown militia leaders |

Casualties and losses
| | 25 killed, unknown wounded, 15–17 captured |

The First Battle of Mora was part of the Taos Revolt of the Mexican–American War, between United States Army troops under Captain Israel R. Hendley, versus a militia of Hispanos (acting as Mexican nationals) and Puebloan allies in US-occupied northern New Mexico. The short skirmish took place on January 24, 1847, in and around the village of Mora, resulting in a US Army defeat and the death of Hendley and several of his men.

== Background ==
The rebellion began in Don Fernando de Taos on January 19, 1847, with the assassination of Governor Charles Bent and a local sheriff, judge, and lawyer, followed by the January 20 killing of at least half a dozen defenders of a mill near Taos, and seven or eight American merchants traveling through Mora to Missouri. Also on January 20, US Army Captain Israel R. Hendley of the Second Missouri Volunteers learned of the insurrection while in command of the grazing detachment along the Pecos River, and took possession of Las Vegas with 250 men, where the insurgents were beginning to gather. On January 22, Hendley learned that the insurgents had gathered a force of 150 or more men in Mora, where he headed with 80 of his men, the rest staying behind in Las Vegas.

== Battle ==
On January 24, Hendley arrived in Mora and "found a body of Mexicans under arms, prepared to defend the town". His men were attacked by the Mexicans who fired from the windows of their houses and from the loop-holes of an old fort nearby. While pursuing the rebels this fort, Hendley was shot and killed. Lacking artillery and senior leadership, the Americans then retreated with 17 prisoners (to be tried for treason, as eastern New Mexico was nominally US territory under the US provisional government of New Mexico). Among the wounded were US Army personnel surnamed Waldo, Noyes, and Culver. The opposing militia reported around 25 dead and an unknown number injured.

In 1878 Lieutenant Colonel Philip St. George Cooke, of the US Army of the West, reported the battle thus:

At the handsome village of Mora, eighteen miles west of the present Fort Union, eight Americans were murdered. January 22d, Capt. Hendley, Second Missouri Volunteers, marched there from Vegas the 24th, with eighty men; he found it occupied by above one hundred and fifty men; he engaged with a number, attempting to enter the town, who were supported by a sally; he then assaulted the town; he penetrated from house to house, some of which were destroyed and into one end of their fort, where he was killed and several were wounded. Lieut. McKarney then – apprehending the return of from three hundred to five hundred men, who had left there that day for Pueblo – withdrew, and marched back to Las Vegas, with fifteen prisoners; he reported fifteen to twenty of the enemy slain.

== Aftermath ==
It is unknown why Hendley chose to march with inferior numbers and no artillery against such a large force. As Colonel Cooke indicates, the sense on the American side was that the death of Hendley and his men was in some way an unprovoked injustice that had to be answered.

The Americans returned in force for revenge a week later. Under Capt. Jesse I. Morin, and with artillery, they razed the town to the ground on February 1 in the Second Battle of Mora.

== See also ==
- Battles of the Mexican–American War
- List of battles fought in New Mexico
