= Taos Revolt =

Insurrection in New Mexico Territory in 1847

- Part of the Mexican–American War
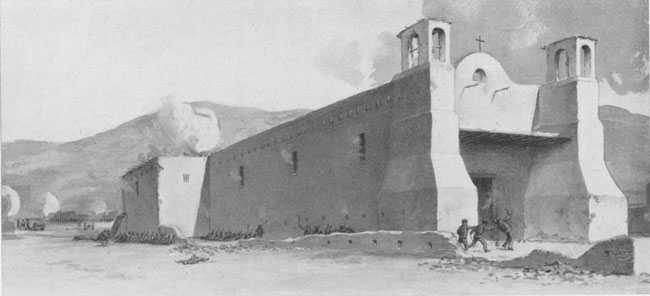
- The Siege of Pueblo de Taos, depicting John Burgwin's death (far right).
| Date | January 19 – July 9, 1847 |
| Location | Northern New Mexico, United States |
| Result | See § Aftermath |

Belligerents
| United States | Hispano rebels Taos Pueblo rebels |

Commanders and leaders
| Gov. Charles Bent †; Sterling Price; John Burgwin †; Ceran St. Vrain; Israel R. Hendley †; Jesse I. Morin | Pablo Montoya (executed) Tomásito Romero |

Casualties and losses
| 11 killed 24 wounded | ~367 killed ~103 wounded ~400 captured |
- Civilian casualties: ~20 killed, including Simeon Turley

The Taos Revolt was a popular insurrection in January 1847 by Hispano and Pueblo allies against the United States' occupation of present-day northern New Mexico during the Mexican–American War. Provisional governor Charles Bent and several other Americans were killed by the rebels. In two short campaigns, United States troops and militia crushed the rebellion of the Hispano and Pueblo people. The New Mexicans, seeking better representation, regrouped and fought three more engagements, but after being defeated, they abandoned open warfare. Causes of the revolt included New Mexicans' hatred for the occupying American army and Taos residents' oft-exercised rebelliousness against externally imposed authority. In the aftermath of the revolt, the Americans executed at least 28 rebels. The Treaty of Guadalupe Hidalgo in 1848 guaranteed the property rights of New Mexico's Hispanic and Native American residents.

== Background ==
In August 1846, the territory of New Mexico, then under Mexican rule, fell to U.S. forces under Stephen Watts Kearny. Governor Manuel Armijo surrendered at the Battle of Santa Fe without firing a shot. When Kearny departed with his forces for California, he left Colonel Sterling Price in command of U.S. forces in New Mexico. He appointed Charles Bent as New Mexico's first territorial governor.

Many New Mexicans were unreconciled to Armijo's surrender; they also resented their treatment by U.S. soldiers, which Governor Bent described:

As other occupation troops have done at other times and places have done, they undertook to act like conquerors." Gov. Bent implored Price's superior, Col. Alexander Doniphan, "to interpose your authority to compel the soldiers to respect the rights of the inhabitants. These outrages are becoming so frequent that I apprehend serious consequences must result sooner or later if measures are not taken to prevent them.

An issue more significant than the galling daily insults was that many New Mexican citizens feared that their land titles, issued by the Mexican government, would not be recognized by the United States. They worried that American sympathizers would prosper at their expense. Following Kearny's departure, dissenters in Santa Fe plotted a Christmas uprising. When the plans were discovered by the U.S. authorities, the dissenters postponed the uprising. They attracted numerous Native American allies, including Puebloan peoples, who also wanted to push the Americans from the territory.

== Revolt ==
=== Taos assassinations ===
On the morning of January 19, 1847, the insurrectionists began the revolt in Don Fernando de Taos, present-day Taos, New Mexico and nearby Taos Pueblo. They were led by Pablo Montoya, a Hispano with Taos Pueblo ancestry, and Tomás Romero from Taos Pueblo, also known as Tomasito (Little Thomas).

Romero led a Native American force to the house of Governor Charles Bent, where they broke down the door, shot Bent with arrows, and scalped him in front of his family. After they moved on, Bent was still alive. With his wife Ignacia and children, and the wives of friends Kit Carson and Thomas Boggs, the group escaped by digging through the adobe walls of their house into the one next door. When the insurgents discovered the party, they killed Bent, but left the women and children unharmed.

The rebel force killed and scalped several other government officials, along with others seen as related to the new U.S. territorial government. Among those killed were Stephen Lee, acting county sheriff; Cornelio Vigil, prefect and probate judge; and J.W. Leal, circuit attorney. "It appeared," wrote Colonel Price, "to be the object of the insurrectionists to put to death every American and every Mexican who had accepted office under the American government."

=== Arroyo Hondo and Mora Battles ===
The next day a large armed force of approximately 500 Hispanos and Puebloans attacked and laid siege to Simeon Turley's mill and distillery in Arroyo Hondo, several miles north of Taos. Charles Autobees, an employee at the mill, saw the men coming. He rode to Santa Fe for help from the occupying U.S. forces. Eight to ten mountain men were left at the mill for defense. After a day-long battle, only two of the mountain men, John David Albert and Thomas Tate Tobin, survived. Both escaped separately on foot during the night. The same day Hispano insurgents killed seven or eight American traders who were passing through the village of Mora on their way to Missouri. At most 16 Americans were killed in both actions on January 20.

=== U.S. Reprisals ===
The U.S. military moved quickly to quash the revolt; Col. Price led more than 300 U.S. troops from Santa Fe to Taos, together with 65 volunteers, including a few New Mexicans, organized by Ceran St. Vrain, the business partner of the brothers William and Charles Bent. Along the way, the combined forces beat back a force of some 1,500 Hispanos and Puebloans at Santa Cruz de la Cañada and Embudo Pass. The insurgents retreated to Taos Pueblo, where they took refuge in the thick-walled adobe church.

During the ensuing battle, the U.S. breached a wall of the church and directed cannon fire into the interior, inflicting many casualties and killing about 150 rebels. They captured 400 more men after close hand-to-hand fighting. Seven U.S. troops died in the battle.

A separate force of U.S. troops campaigned against the rebels in Mora. The First Battle of Mora, under Captain Israel R. Hendley, ended in a New Mexican strategic victory and Hendley's death. The Americans attacked again, under Capt. Jesse I. Morin, in the Second Battle of Mora and destroyed the village, which ended the Mora campaign of the revolt.

=== Aftermath ===
The next day, U.S. officials ordered the execution of some of the captives in the plaza in a drumhead court-martial, including the leader "Montojo" Pablo Montoya. Price then set up a military court in Taos to try more of the captured insurgents under civil law. He appointed as judges Joab Houghton, a close friend of Charles Bent; and Charles H. Beaubien, the father of Narcisse Beaubien, who had been killed on January 19. Both men had previously been appointed as judges to the New Mexico Territory Superior Court by the late Gov. Bent in August of the previous year. George Bent, Charles' brother, was elected foreman of the jury. The jury included Lucien Maxwell, a brother-in-law of Beaubien; and several friends of the Bents. Ceran St. Vrain served as court interpreter. Since the Anglo community in Taos was small, and several men had been killed by the rebels, the jury pool was extremely limited. The court was in session for fifteen days. The jury found 15 men guilty of murder and treason (under the new U.S. rule), and the judges sentenced them to death.

An eyewitness, Lewis Hector Garrard, described the trial and events:

It certainly did appear to be a great assumption of the part of the Americans to conquer a country and then arraign the revolting inhabitants for treason. American judges sat on the bench, New Mexicans and Americans filled the jury box, and an American soldiery guarded the halls. Verily, a strange mixture of violence and justice-a strange middle ground between martial and common law. After an absence of a few minutes the jury returned with a verdict, "Guilty in the first degree". Five for murder, one for treason. Treason, indeed! What did the poor devil know about his new allegiance? ... I left the room, sick at heart. Justice! Out upon the word when its distorted meaning is a warrant for murdering those who defended to the last their country and their homes.

On April 9, the U.S. forces hanged six of the convicted insurgents in the Taos plaza; all but one were convicted of murder, with the other being hanged of treason. This was the first execution by hanging in the Taos Valley. Two weeks later, the U.S. forces executed five more. In all, the U.S. hanged at least 28 men in Taos in response to the revolt. A year later, the United States Secretary of War reviewed the case. He said that the one man hanged for treason, Hipolito "Polo" Salazar, might have been wrongfully convicted. The Supreme Court of the United States agreed. All other convictions were affirmed.

=== Further fighting ===
The revolt did not end after the Siege of Taos. New Mexican rebels engaged U.S. forces three more times in the following months. The actions are known as the Battle of Red River Canyon, the Battle of Las Vegas, and the Battle of Cienega Creek. After the U.S. forces won each battle, the New Mexicans and Native Americans ended open warfare.

The Red River Canyon affair, or the Battle of Red River Canyon: on May 26, 1847, United States Army Major Edmondson, with a company of two hundred infantry and cavalry under Captains Holaway and Robinson, were marching at almost sunset along the Red (Canadian) River. They had just entered Red River Canyon when ambushed by an estimated 500 Mexicans and natives, according to reports given to Colonel Alexander Doniphan, a commander during the New Mexican Campaign. Red River Canyon being very narrow and full of thick, deep mud, Major Edmundson was forced to dismount his cavalry and proceed in the attack on foot with the infantry. Now all on foot, the Americans pushed forward and began to break up the ambush. The Mexicans and natives were repulsed but soon regrouped and assaulted the American position. The Americans slowly made an organized retreat, the withdrawal being covered by a Lieutenant Elliot and his Laclede rangers. At sunrise, the Americans reformed and reentered the canyon, where they discovered that the Mexicans and natives had retreated just before their arrival.

The Cienega affair, or the Battle of Cienega Creek: the last engagement of the Taos Revolt during the Mexican–American War. The battle occurred on July 9, 1847 and was fought between New Mexican insurgents, Pueblo natives and United States Army troops. On July 9, 1847 a detachment of thirty-one men, belonging to Captain Morin's company of American infantry were stationed close to Cienega Creek about eighteen miles from Taos, New Mexico. On this early morning the Americans were attacked by two hundred New Mexican militia and their Pueblo allies. The ensuing battle resulted in an American retreat to the banks of Cienega Creek. They were able to hold their position until Captain Shepherd's company arrived, "vanquishing the enemy".

== See also ==
- History of New Mexico
- List of assassinated American politicians
