= Lewis Hector Garrard =

American travel writer

Lewis Hector Garrard (15 June 1829 – 7 July 1887) was an American travel writer who wrote an enduring book, Wah-to-yah and the Taos Trail, about his visit to the southwestern United States in 1846-1847.

== Background ==
Garrard, christened Hector Lewis Garrard, was the son of a prominent family in Cincinnati, Ohio On 1 Sept 1846, Garrard, 17 years old, joined a caravan in Westport Landing, Missouri to travel along the Santa Fe Trail to New Mexico. He stopped off at Bent's Fort for two months and continued on to Taos with a company of Mountain Men to avenge the death of Charles Bent in the Taos Revolt. While in Taos, Garrard attended the trial of some of the Mexicans and Pueblos who had revolted against U.S. rule of New Mexico, newly captured in the Mexican–American War. Garrard wrote the only eye witness account of the trial and hanging of six convicted men.

Wah-to-Yah is the only well-known book written by Garrard. It has won a secure place in the literature of the American West. Garrard returned home after his 10-month trip and apparently never visited the West again.

== Wah-to-Yah and the Taos Trail ==
The full title of Garrard's book is Wah-to-yah and the Taos Trail: or Prairie and Scalp Dances, with a Look at Los Rancheros from Muleback and the Rocky Mountain Campfire. The book is "fresh and vigorous" and contains in its pages authentic descriptions of "the Indian, the trader, the mountain man, their dress, and behavior and speech and the country and climate they lived in." The pages of the book contain a wealth of characters, including Kit Carson, Jim Beckwourth, Ceran St. Vrain, George Ruxton, William Bent, and others. The book contains an "anthropologically accurate" description of the Cheyenne Indians. Garrard condemns the U.S. war against Mexico and hanging of the rebels in Taos as unjust.

Wah-to-Yah, the title, is the Indian name for the Spanish Peaks in southern Colorado. The book is often compared with Francis Parkman's, The Oregon Trail: Sketches of Prairie and Rocky-Mountain Life. Both are by young men visiting the West in 1846, but Garrard's account is "the fresher, the more revealing, the more engaging, the less labored."

== See also ==
- Taos Mountain Trail
