= Tomás Romero (revolutionary) =

Leader of Taos Pueblo during Taos Revolt

Tomás "Tomasito" Romero, (assassinated February 8, 1848) was a Pueblo from Taos Pueblo, where he was referred to as "the alcalde." He was a leader of the Taos Revolt against the American invasion of New Mexico during the Mexican–American War. At the beginning of the revolt, "Tomacito leaned over the governor's (Charles Bent) still living form and raked a bowstring over his scalp, pulling away his gray hair in a glistening sheath ... 'cut as cleanly with the tight cord as it would have with a knife' "

After the failure of the revolt Romero was given up to the U.S. Army as part of the terms of surrender following the battle at the pueblo on February 5.

He was shot while in prison by Private John Fitzgerald on February 8, "before he had the opportunity to have a trial."

== See also ==
- List of assassinated American politicians
