= Charles Autobees =

Fur trader and American pioneer

Charles Autobees (1812–1882)

Charles Autobees (1812–1882), whose last name was also spelled Urtebise and Ortivis, was a fur trader and pioneer in the American Old West. He was the founder of Autobees, Colorado.

== Early life ==
Charles Autobees was born in St. Louis in 1812 to Francis Autobees and Sarah T. Tate. Francis was French-Canadian and may have had Native American heritage as well. After Francis drowned in the Saint Lawrence River while logging, Sarah married Bartholomew Tobin, who was living in St. Louis. Sarah and Bartholomew had another son, Thomas Tate Tobin.

== Fur trader ==
By the age of 16, Autobees was a fur trader based in St. Louis. Many of his activities are unclear, but he was associated with many famous figures of the old west including Jim Bridger, Kit Carson, Juan Antonio Laforet, Geminien P. Beauvais, James Bordeaux, Charles Nadeau, Chat Dubray, Jean Baptiste Charlefou, Tom Tobin, A. G. Boone, Carlos Beaubien, Joseph Barnoy and James P. Beckwourth. In the early 1830s, he was a part of the American Fur Company and may have taken part in a battle with the Blackfeet on Salmon River. This was likely one of the many battles described in Thomas D. Bonner's Life and Adventures of James P. Beckwourth. He may also have been involved in the July 1832 battle known as the rendezvous at Pierre's Hole.

There are conflicting accounts for many parts of Autobees' life. Autobees' son claimed that his father took a Flathead woman for a partner and had a daughter named Eliza with her. In another account, Autobees spent twenty years with an Arapaho woman named Sycamore.

In 1834, Autobees left the American Fur Company and moved to Fort Hall on the Snake River where he worked for Nathaniel Wyeth and Robert Evans. In 1835, Autobees joined a party of Hudson's Bay Company trappers. In the spring of that year, his party had another battle with Blackfeet.

== Taos ==
In 1836, Charles settled in Taos, taking a job with flour mill and distillery operator, Simeon Turley. Autobees became Turley's traveling salesman. He customarily loaded two 10-gallon barrels of whiskey on each mule of a mule train and proceeded north from Taos through the San Luis Valley, crossed the Sangre de Cristo Mountains at La Veta Pass, and descended to the Great Plains. He traded the whiskey for buffalo robes and beaver pelts in the Arkansas and Platte river valleys, and sent the robes and pelts by wagon train to Missouri for them to be sold.

Autobees took another woman as a housekeeper, Serafina Avila, who had two more sons, Mariano in 1837 and Jose Tomas, known as Tom, in 1842. Serafina remained with Tom until her death in the 1870s. Autobees remained with and worked for Turley for eleven years. During that period, Autobees moved around, spending the winter of 1841-1842 and part of the winter of 1842-1843 at Fort Lancaster. He also accompanied Turley's trade wagons to New Mexico in the early 1840s.

On January 20, 1847, Turley and his operation was attacked by Taos area Indians and Mexicans as part of the Taos Revolt as revenge for the United States invasion and annexation of Mexico in the Mexican-American War. Tom Tobin managed to escape and Autobee was on a mule train travelling to Santa Fe, but Turley died with many of his men. Autobee brought news of the revolt and acting territorial Governor Charles Bent's death to Bent's Fort.

In 1847, Autobee and Tobin were living and farming on the St. Charles River south of Pueblo. In 1849, Autobees, Asa Estes, Bill Williams and others were employed as guides and spies by Lieutenant J. H. Whittlesey in an attack on the Utes in reparation for perceived injuries of settlers in along the Colorado River.

== Autobees settlement ==
In 1853, Richens Lacy Wootton, Levin Mitchell, William Kroenig, and Autobees built the Huerfano village (Autobees, Colorado) on the south side of the Arkansas River near the mouth of the Huerfano River.

== Bibliography ==
- Lecompte, Janet (November 1, 1980). Pueblo, Hardscrabble, Greenhorn: Society on the High Plains, 1832-1856. University of Oklahoma Press. ISBN 978-0-8061-1723-2.
