= Siege of Pueblo de Taos =

1847 US victory in Mexican-American War

Coordinates: 36°26′20″N 105°32′43″W

- Part of the Taos Revolt; Mexican–American War
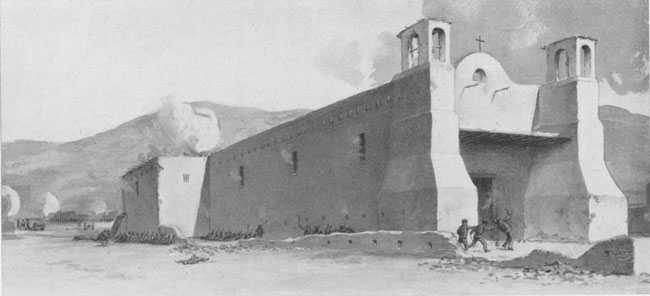
- The death of John Burgwin at the Siege of Taos.
Date	February 3–5, 1847
Location	Pueblo de Taos, New Mexico
Result	American victory

Belligerents
United States	Mexico

Commanders and leaders
Sterling Price; John Burgwin †; Ceran St. Vrain	Pablo Chávez; Pablo Montoya †; Tomás Romero †

Strength
478	600–700

Casualties and losses
7–10 killed 45 wounded	~150 killed

The siege of Pueblo de Taos was the final battle during the main phase of the Taos Revolt, an insurrection against the United States during the Mexican–American War. It was also the final major engagement between American forces and insurgent forces in New Mexico during the war.

== Background ==
In August 1846, New Mexico fell to American troops under Stephen Watts Kearny. When Kearny departed for California, Colonel Sterling Price was left in command of American forces in New Mexico. In January 1847, Price learned of a Mexican revolt in the territory and defeated the rebels at the Battle of Cañada and Battle of Embudo Pass as his forces moved on to Pueblo de Taos, the center of insurrection activity. Another American force fought the New Mexicans at Mora, on the east side of the Sangre de Cristo Mountains.

On 1 Feb., his force of 478 men reached the summit of Taos Mountain, covered in two feet of snow, and on 2 Feb., Rio Chiquito, the entrance to Taos Valley. On 3 Feb., Price marched through Don Fernando de Taos and then found the rebels had strongly fortified Pueblo de Taos.

== Siege ==
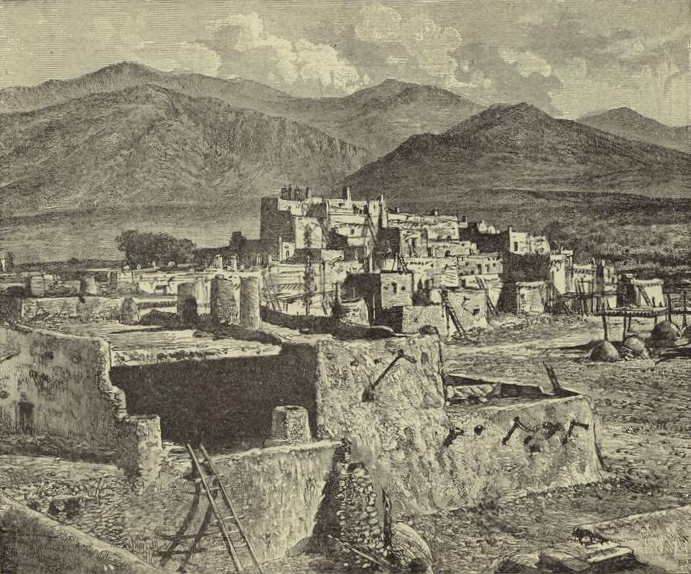
The Taos Pueblo, an 1893 illustration

Price ordered Lt. Dyer to set up an artillery battery, consisting of a 6-pounder and the howitzers, 250 yards from the western flank of the church and began firing at 2 PM and continued for two and a half hours before retiring to Don Fernando for the evening. Early on 4 Feb., he placed Capt. Burgwin's 1st Dragoon Regiment, and Major Clarke's light artillery, in the same position he had the battery the evening before, Capt. St. Vrain's and Capt. Slack's mounted men were placed to prevent escape towards the mountains or Don Fernando, and the remaining men were placed 300 yards from the northern wall along with Lt. Dyer's artillery battery. This placed the front and eastern flank of the church in a crossfire.

The batteries started firing at 9 AM, which failed to breach the church walls, so by 11 AM, Price ordered a storming of the church. Capt. Burgwin and Capt. McMillin charged the western flank of the church, while Capt. Agney, Lt. Boon, and Capt. Barber the northern wall. The roof of the church was set fire, but Capt. Burgwin was mortally wounded while moving through the corral at the front of the church. A hole was cut in the western wall which permitted shells to be thrown in by hand, while the 6-pounder was placed so it could fire grape into the town. By 3 PM, the 6-pounder was placed sixty yards from the church and widened the hole after ten rounds, after which it was placed ten yards away and fired three rounds of grape into the church. This allowed Lt. Dyer, Lt. Wilson and Taylor to take possession of the church, followed by the rebels abandoning the western part of the town.

Those trying to escape into the mountains were pursued by Capt. Slack and Capt. St. Vrain, killing many before night fell. The rebels surrendered the next day, giving up one of the insurrection leaders, Tomas Romero, a Pueblo Indian.

== Aftermath ==
Two of the accused rebellion leaders, Pablo Montoya and Tomás Romero, were captured in the fighting. Romero was shot by Private Fitzgerald in the guard room at Don Fernando before being brought to trial. Montoya was convicted of treason and hanged at Don Fernando on 7 Feb. Later trials resulted in 14 additional public hangings.

Later skirmishes occurred at the Red River Canyon Affair, the Las Vegas Affair and the Taos Affair.

== See also ==
- List of battles fought in New Mexico
- Battles of the Mexican–American War
