= Ceran St. Vrain =

French–American fur trader (1802–1870)

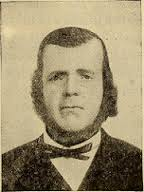
- Born: Ceran de Hault de Lassus de Saint-Vrain; May 5, 1802; St. Louis, Spanish Louisiana, present-day St. Louis, Missouri
- Died: October 28, 1870 (aged 68); Mora, New Mexico Territory, present-day Mora, New Mexico
- Resting place: Saint Vrain Cemetery, Mora, New Mexico
- Occupations: Frontier trader, militia leader, newspaperman
- Employer(s): Bent, St. Vrain & Company, U.S. Government
- Spouses: Maria Dolores Luna, Maria Ignacia Trujillo, Louise Branch, Luz Beaubien
- Children: Jose Vincente (with Maria Dolores Luna), Mathias, Felix, Ysabel, Marcelino (with Maria Ignacia Trujillo), Felicitas, Margara (with Louise/Luisa Branch)
- Parent(s): Jacques Marcellin Ceran de Hault de Lassus Saint-Vrain and Marie Félicité Dubreuil Saint-Vrain
- Relatives: Felix St. Vrain (brother), Savinien St. Vrain (brother), Marcellin St. Vrain (brother) Charles Emmanuel St. Vrain (brother), Domitille St Vrain (brother), Emma de Hault Vrain (sister)

Ceran St. Vrain, born Ceran de Hault de Lassus de Saint-Vrain (May 5, 1802 – October 28, 1870), was a French-American fur trader active in the American West during the 19th century. His father was a French aristocrat who emigrated to Spanish Louisiana in the late 18th century, and his mother was from St. Louis, where he was born. To gain license to trade in the frontier territories of New Spain, in 1831 he became a naturalized Mexican citizen in what is now the state of New Mexico. He formed a partnership with American traders William, George and Charles Bent, and together they established the trading post of Bent's Fort in what is now the state of Colorado.

In addition to his trading post business, St. Vrain formed a business partnership with Cornelio Vigil. In 1843 the two men petitioned for and received a land grant of approximately 4 million acres (1,600,000 ha) located in what is now southeastern Colorado. However, their plans for development of the area were halted due to the onset of the Mexican–American War, in which the United States invaded and acquired the Southwest and California.

Following the creation of the U.S. provisional government of New Mexico in 1847, St. Vrain organized a group of volunteers who fought alongside the U.S. Army during the Taos Revolt. After the deaths of Charles and George Bent, William Bent and St. Vrain dissolved their partnership. St. Vrain settled in Mora, New Mexico Territory. There he owned saw and flourmills and was a supplier to the U.S. Army garrison at nearby Fort Union.

== Early life ==
Ceran St. Vrain was the son of a French aristocrat who came to the United States in the late 18th century to escape the French Revolution. His father was Jacques Marcellin Ceran de Hault de Lassus Saint-Vrain (1770–1818), the third son of Pierre de Luzière. Jacques was previously an officer in the French navy. Once in Spanish Louisiana, he became commander of the Spanish King's galiot La Flecha – the Arrow – and captain of militia. His mother was Marie Félicité Chauvet Dubreuil of Saint Louis, Missouri, which had a predominantly French population. His parents were married on April 30, 1796; they had a large family. One of Ceran's brothers was Felix St. Vrain. He became a U.S. Indian agent and was killed in 1832 by the Ho-Chunk tribe, in what came to be known as the St. Vrain Massacre, during the Black Hawk War.

The family eventually settled near Saint Louis, Missouri, where Ceran was born on May 5, 1802. Jacques St. Vrain died insolvent in 1818. He had never recovered from the loss of his brewery, which burned down in 1813. After his father's death, Ceran became a clerk with Bernard Pratte and Company, a trading firm located in Saint Louis.

== Into the fur trade ==
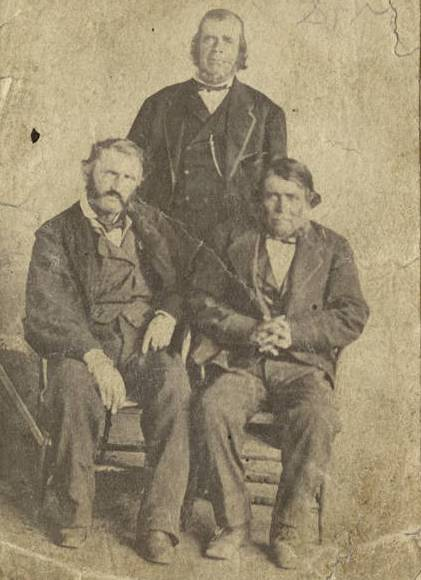
Ceran St. Vrain (standing) with "Uncle Dick" Wootton and territorial legislator José Maria Valdez, 1865

Eager for adventure, in 1824 Ceran St. Vrain persuaded Bernard Pratte to support a trading venture to Taos, New Mexico, part of newly independent Mexico. After establishing a trading post in Taos, St. Vrain travelled between Missouri and New Mexico for several years, including as far south as the Gila River in present-day southwestern Arizona. He also trapped near the North Platte River in Colorado. In 1830 St. Vrain was part of a caravan of traders on their way to Taos which was intercepted near the Canadian River by Colonel José Antonio Vizcarra (sometimes referred to as "Viscarra"). According to Ceran St. Vrain, "The object in coming out so fare to meet us was to prevent Smuggling and it had the desired effeck."

In 1831, when he was living in Taos, St. Vrain became a naturalized Mexican citizen, which enabled him to avoid the restrictions placed on American traders in what was then Mexican territory. He soon afterward formed a partnership with American trader William Bent. The new company was known as Bent, St. Vrain & Company and its trading area covered much of current Wyoming, New Mexico, Kansas, and Colorado. They established company trading posts in Santa Fe and Taos, where their wagon trains made deliveries of goods shipped from Independence and Westport, Missouri. They traded cloth, glass, hardware, and tobacco for silver, furs, horses, and mules.

The Bent–St. Vrain Company built Bent's Fort, an elaborate adobe fort on the eastern Colorado plains, along the Santa Fe Trail. Bent's Fort was the only privately owned fortification in the American West. It became a premier trading center and rendezvous for fur trappers. Bent's Fort has been reconstructed and is a National Historic Site. Ceran St. Vrain also helped establish what is now called Old Fort Saint Vrain, along the South Platte River.

== Mexican–American War and Taos Revolt ==
During the Taos Revolt, Ceran St. Vrain organized a volunteer force to support the U.S. re-taking of Taos, during the Mexican–American War. Joining more than 300 U.S. troops in Santa Fe, St. Vrain's 65 men set off for Taos. Along the way, they forced the retreat of some 1,500 Mexican and Indian rebels, who took refuge in a thick-walled adobe church in Taos Pueblo.

During the Siege of Pueblo de Taos, Ceran St. Vrain's "Emergency Brigade" positioned themselves between the church and the mountains. They cut off rebel forces attempting to escape the federal troops' artillery fire and frontal assault. The mounted volunteers reportedly raided the rebels and killed a total of 51 Mexicans and Taos Indians in the fierce, close-quarters fighting that followed. St. Vrain's life was saved by one of his volunteers, a New Mexican named Manuel Chaves.

Ceran St. Vrain acted as the translator in the following military trial of numerous captives taken at Taos. Fifteen men were convicted of treason and sentenced to death. They were executed in April 1847.

== Gristmill and newspaper ==
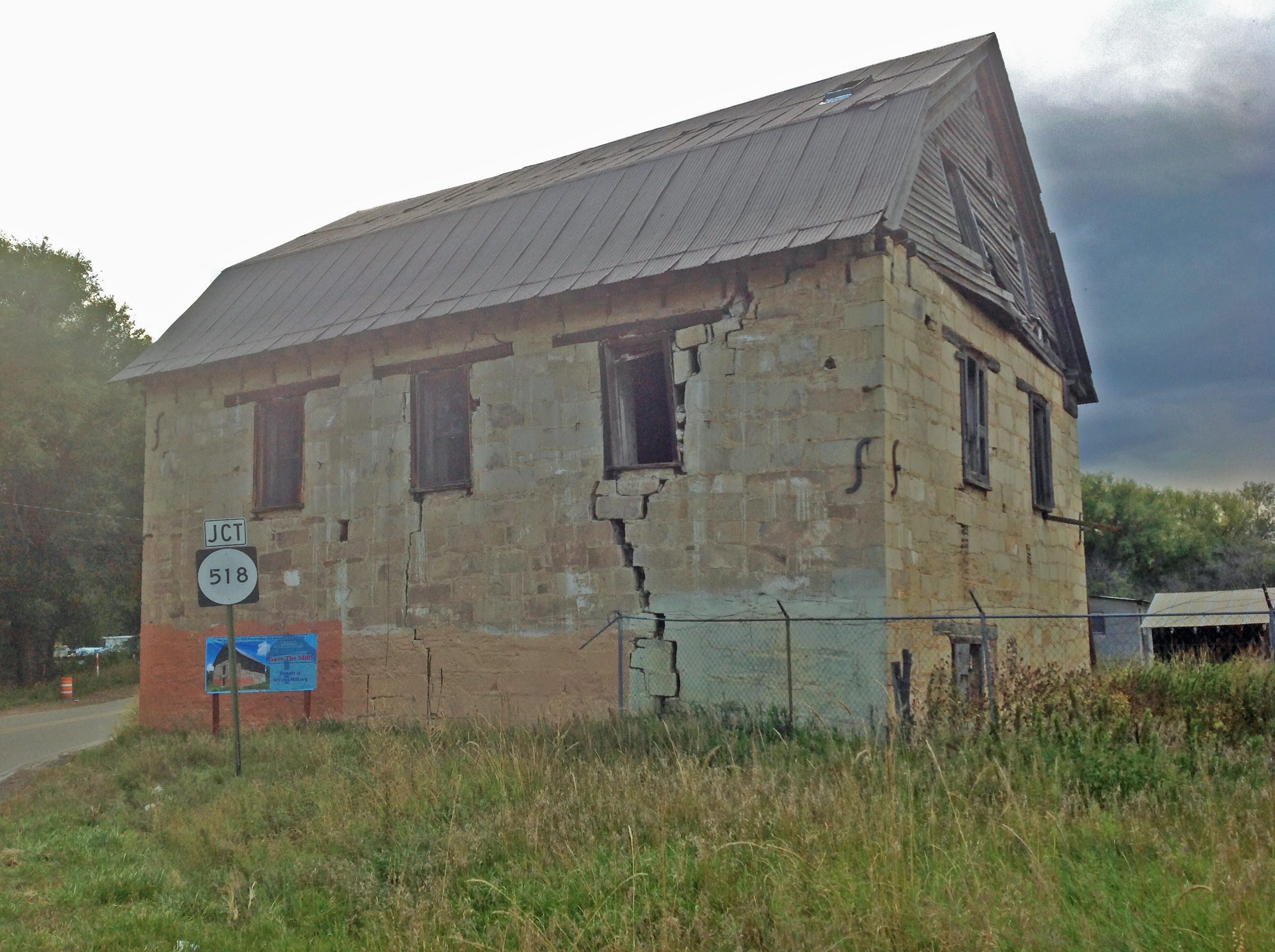
St. Vrain's Mill in 2014

In 1855, Ceran St. Vrain settled in Mora County, where he built a flour mill known as St. Vrain's Mill. He supplied flour to Fort Union in Mora Valley, north of Las Vegas, New Mexico, and to Fort Garland in southwestern Colorado. He also began publishing one of northern New Mexico's first English-language newspapers, the Santa Fe Gazette.

== Personal life ==
Ceran St. Vrain had at least six children; historians disagree on whether Ceran was legally married to all the mothers of his children. He may have taken "country wives" among indigenous women in New Mexico, which was typical of many fur traders at the time.

On October 28, 1870, Ceran St. Vrain died at the home of his son Vincente in Mora. More than 2,000 people attended his funeral, which included the U.S. Army garrison from Fort Union. St. Vrain was buried in what is now named St. Vrain Cemetery in Mora.

== Namesakes ==
St. Vrain Creek, which flows through St. Vrain Canyon and St. Vrain Valley, near Lyons, Colorado, eventually joining the South Platte River near Fort Saint Vrain, as well as the Fort Saint Vrain Nuclear Power Plant are named after him. The St. Vrain Valley School District in Longmont, Colorado, and the surrounding area are also named after him, as well as St. Vrain Street in central Colorado Springs. St. Vrain Cemetery, near Avondale, Colorado, is located just west of the Huerfano River near where pioneer scout Charles Autobees (also spelled Autobee) settled, and has been a final resting place for area residents since the 19th century.

== See also ==
- Kit Carson
- Thomas Tate Tobin
- Veranus of Cavaillon
