= Arroyo Hondo, Taos County, New Mexico =

Arroyo Hondo
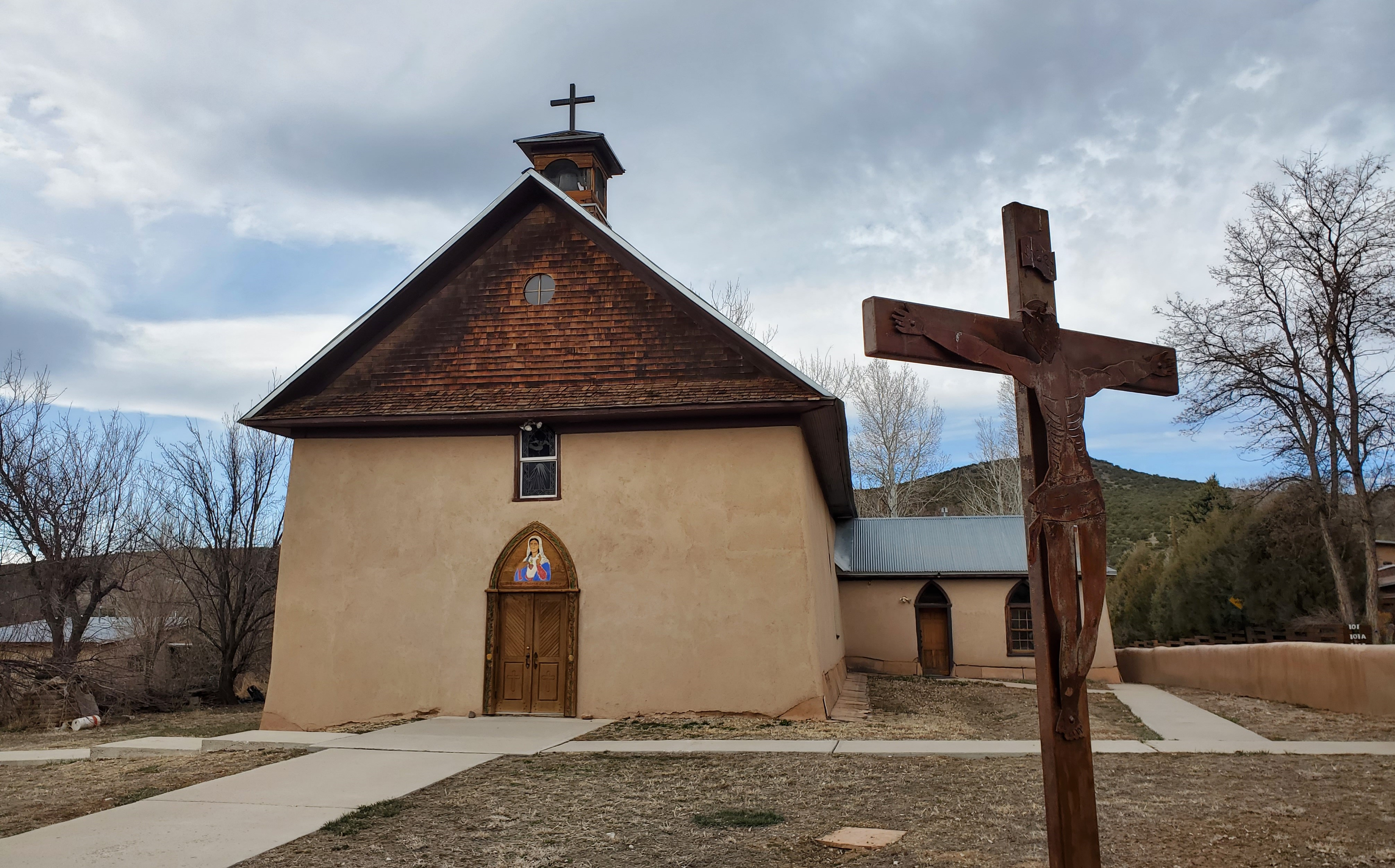
- Nuestra Señora de Dolores Catholic Church

- Location of Arroyo Hondo in New Mexico and in the United States Arroyo Hondo (the United States)
- Coordinates: 36°49′09″N 105°56′23″W
- Country: United States
- State: New Mexico
- County: Taos

Government
  - Type: unincorporated community

Area
  - Total: 1.65 sq mi (4.27 km^{2})
  - Land: 1.65 sq mi (4.27 km^{2})
  - Water: 0 sq mi (0.00 km^{2})
- Elevation: 6,962 ft (2,122 m)

Population (2020)
  - Total: 428
  - Density: 259.7/sq mi (100.29/km^{2})
- Time zone: UTC−7 (Mountain (MST))
  - Summer (DST): UTC−6 (MDT)
- ZIP code: 87513
- Area code: 575
- FIPS code: 35-05010
- GNIS feature ID: 2812758

Arroyo Hondo is a census-designated place in Taos County near Taos, New Mexico, United States. As of the 2010 census, it had a population of 474.

== History ==
It is historically notable as the site of the killing of six to eight employees by a force of allied Native Americans at Simeon Turley's mill and distillery trading post on January 20, 1847. This took place during the Taos Revolt, a populist insurrection of New Mexicans and Native Americans against the new United States territorial regime during the Mexican–American War.

== Demographics ==
Historical population
Census	Pop.	Note	%±
2020	428		—
U.S. Decennial Census

== Education ==
It is within Taos Municipal Schools, which operates Taos High School.

== See also ==
- John Dunn Bridge
- Juan Bautista Rael
- Auguste Lacome
