= History of Mexican Americans =

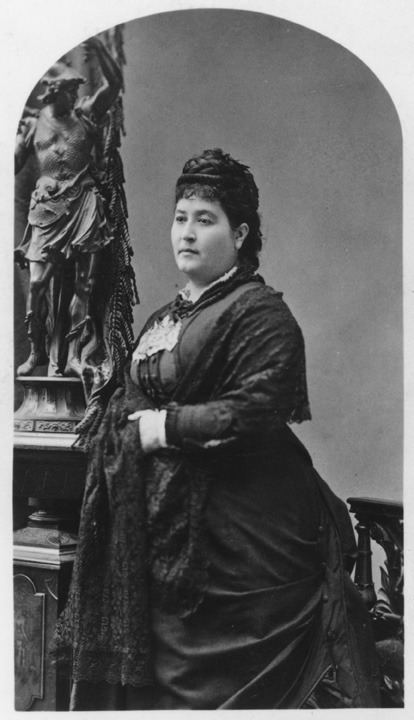
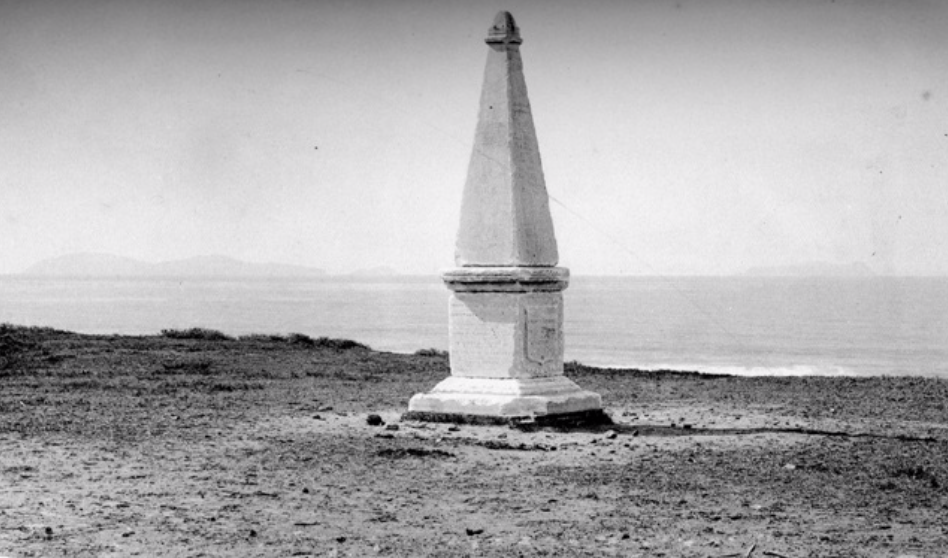
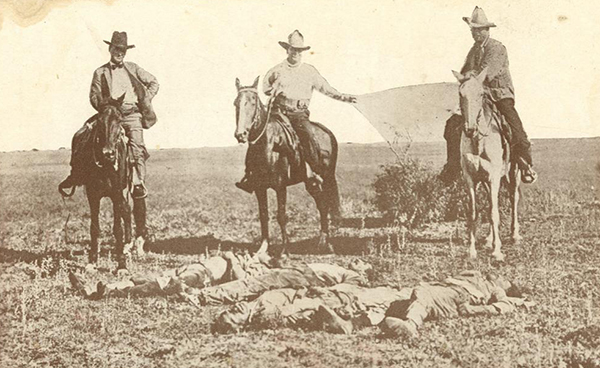
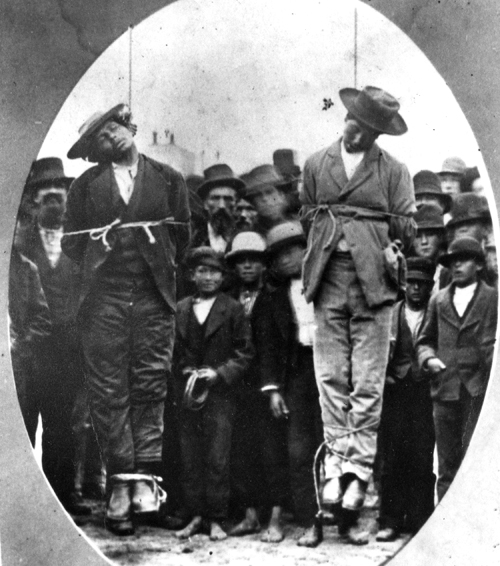
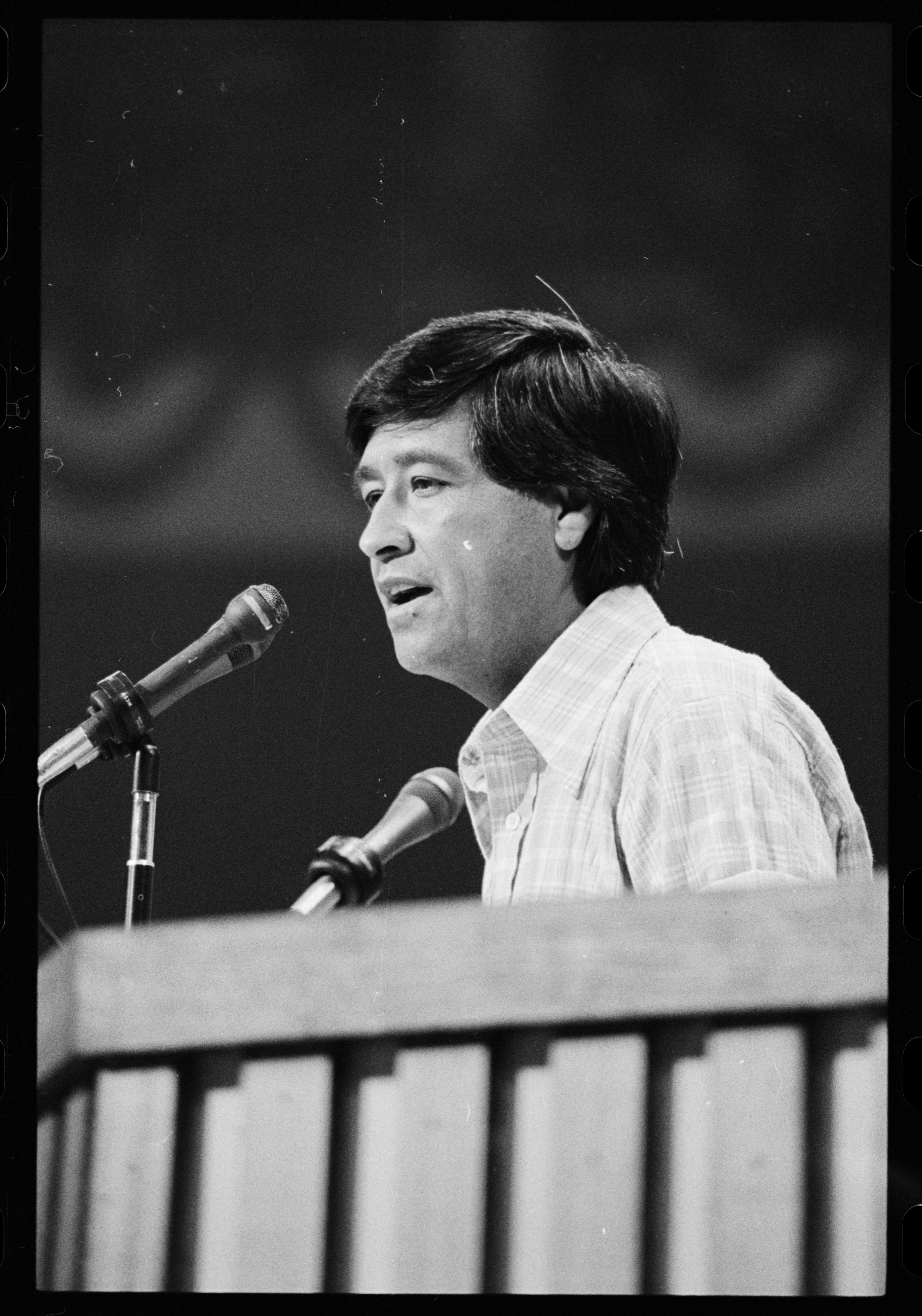
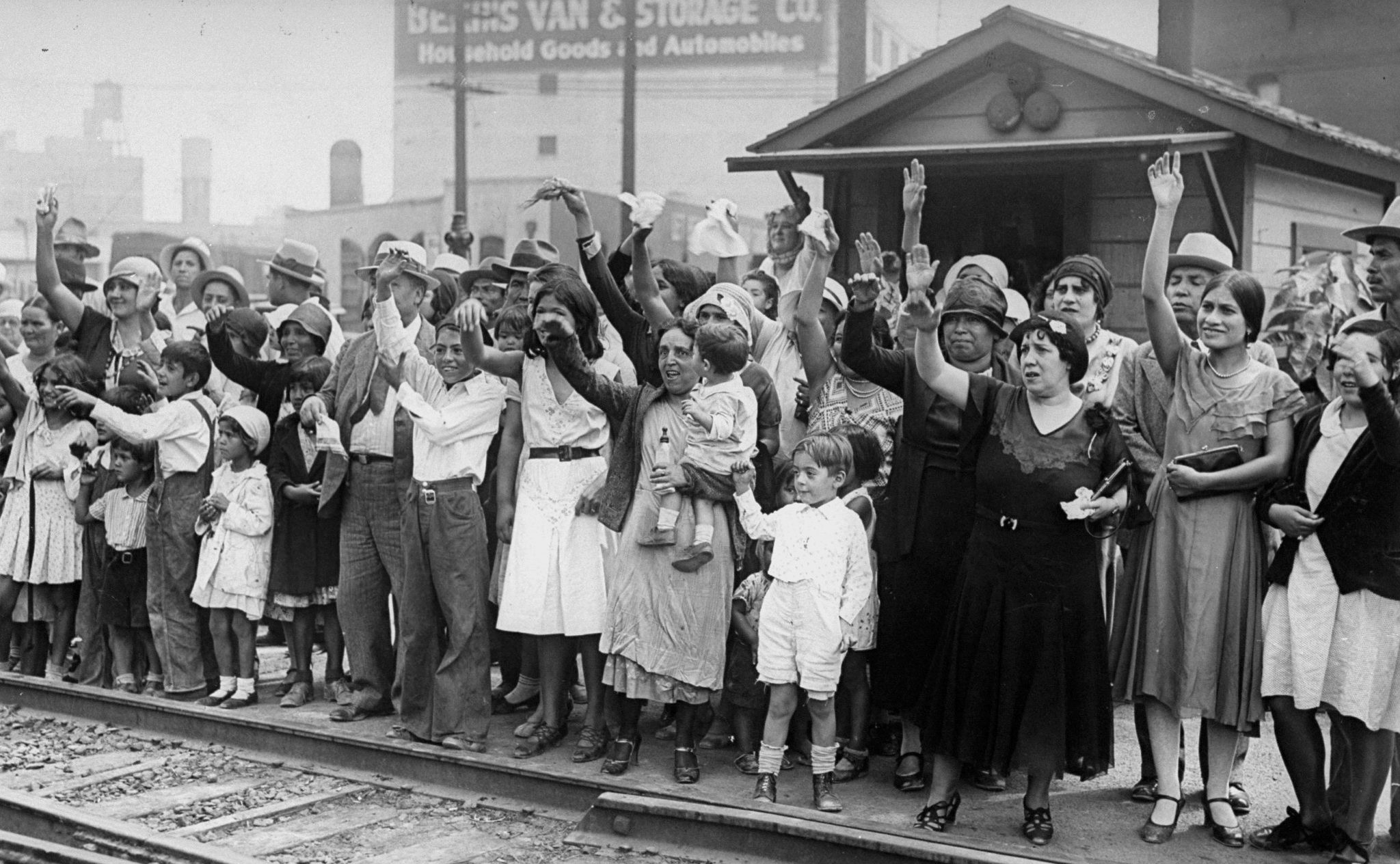
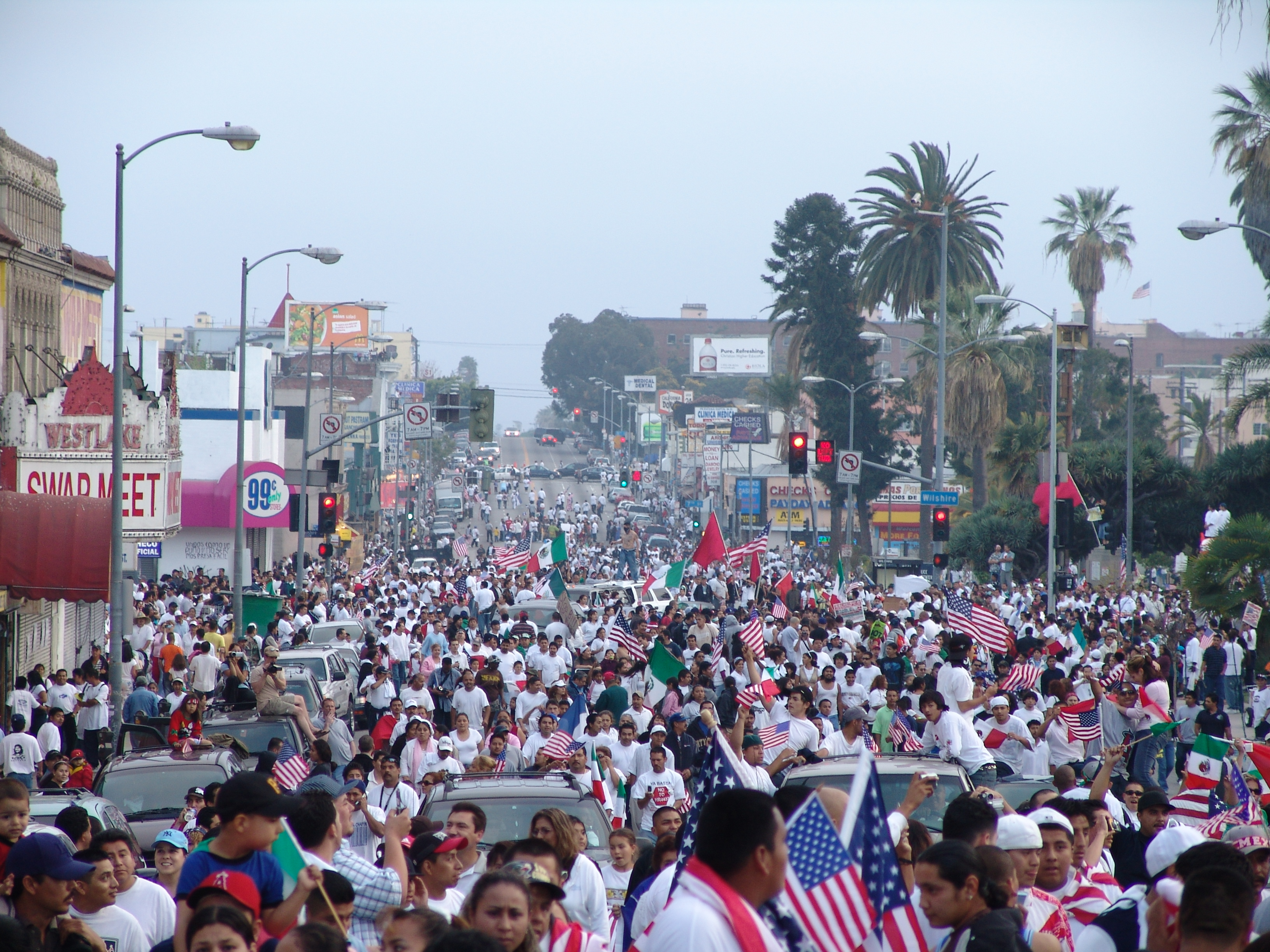
first female Mexican American author in English María Ruiz de Burton, 1887 picture of the initial boundary marking the U.S.-Mexico border, Texas Rangers during the 1910-1920 La Matanza, 1877 lynching of two Mexican-American men in California, civil rights leader Cesar Chavez, the Mexican Repatriation, the Great American Boycott

The history of Mexican Americans largely begins the aftermath of the annexation of Northern Mexico in 1848, when nearly 80,000 Mexican citizens—of what are now California, Nevada, Utah, Arizona, Colorado, and New Mexico—became U.S. citizens. Large-scale migration increased the U.S.' Mexican population during the 1910s, as refugees fled the economic devastation and violence of Mexico's revolution and civil war. Until the mid-20th century, most Mexican Americans lived within a few hundred miles of the border, although some resettled along rail lines from the Southwest into the Midwest.

In the second half of the 20th century, Mexican Americans diffused throughout the U.S., especially into the Midwest and Southeast, though the groups' largest population centers remain in California and Texas. During this period, Mexican-Americans campaigned for voting rights, educational and employment equity, ethnic equality, and economic and social advancement.

== Spanish period ==
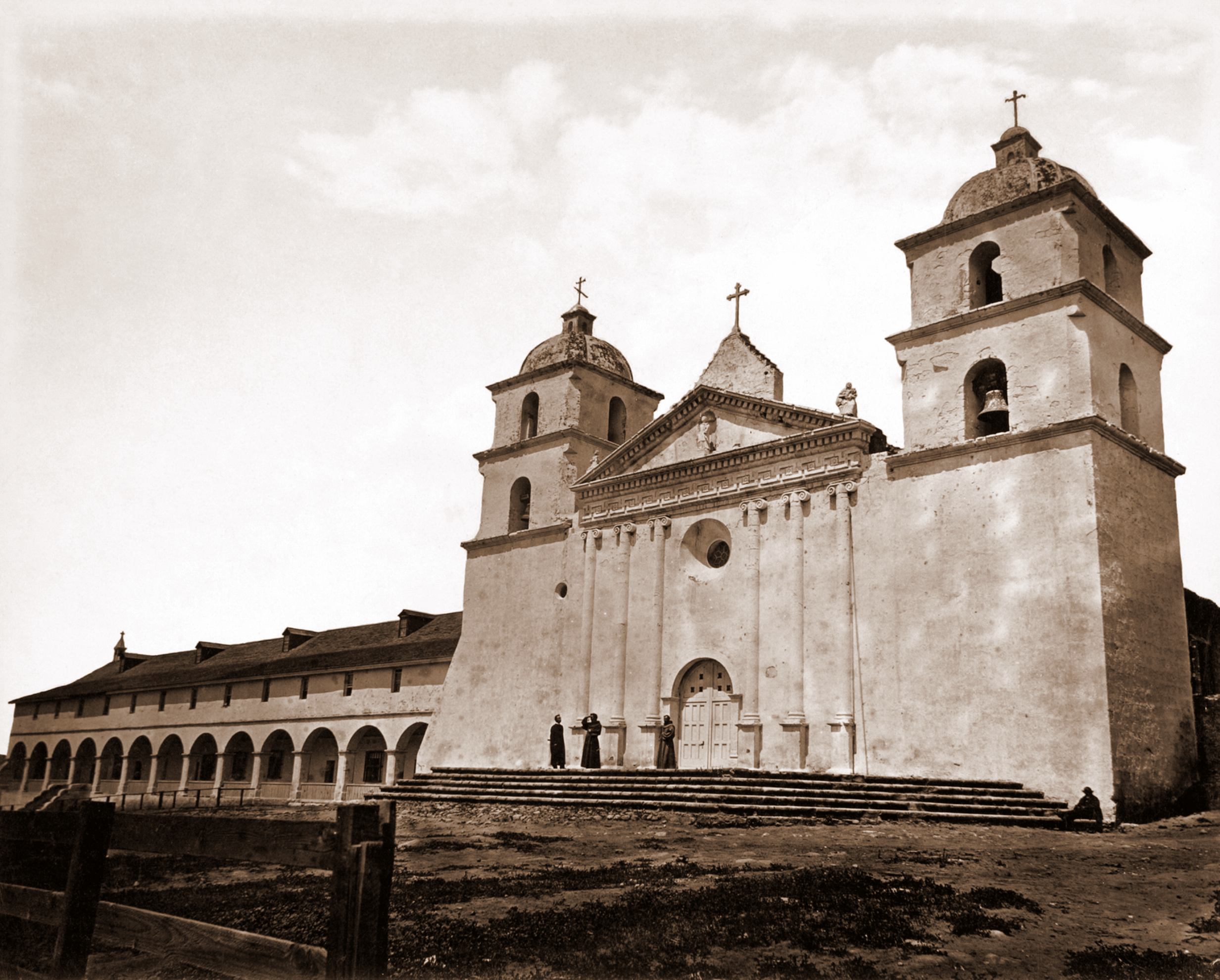
The Santa Barbara Mission, established in 1786

Spanish entry into what is now the United States southwest began in 1540, when Francisco Vázquez de Coronado, his 230 Spanish soldiers, 800 Indigenous Mexicans, and three women marched into the Rio Grande valley. Soon after, Juan Rodriguez Cabrillo led the first expedition into Alta California in 1542, when he landed in modern-day Santa Barbara. There are reports that the explorer Marcos de Niza entered Arizona in 1539, but scholars have cast doubt on his fabled exploration for the Seven Cities of Gold.

Full-scale Spanish colonization of the Southwest did not begin until 1598, when the Spanish government, under pressure from the Catholic Church to Christianize the Coahuiltecan peoples of the Rio Grande Valley, selected Juan Oñate to cross the Rio Grande and establish a permanent settlement in San Juan Pueblo, near present-day Espanola. Rumors of hidden gold and silver ores in New Mexico circulated in the lead-up to the Oñate settlement, but none were ever found in the region. The focus remained on religious conversion.

The first Spanish missions in Texas were colonized in the 1680s around present-day San Angelo, El Paso and Presidio, near the New Mexico settlements. In the early-1680s, however, conflict emerged in New Mexico, as the Pueblo people rebelled against the Spanish colonization. Spanish colonization nevertheless persisted, and in 1690, new missions were built in East Texas by Alonso de León after the Spanish discovered the French had been encroaching into the territory. In Arizona, the first Spanish settlements were founded in 1691 by the Italian Jesuit missionary Father Eusebio Francisco Kino. California's first permanent Spanish settlement wasn't established until 1769, when the Presidio of San Diego was founded by Father Junipero Serra and his accompanying Spanish soldiers. This marked the beginning of the Mission system, an era infamous for its brutality toward Indigenous peoples.

The Spanish period ended in 1821 with the signing of the Treaty of Córdoba, which officially ended the Mexican War of Independence.

== Mexican period ==
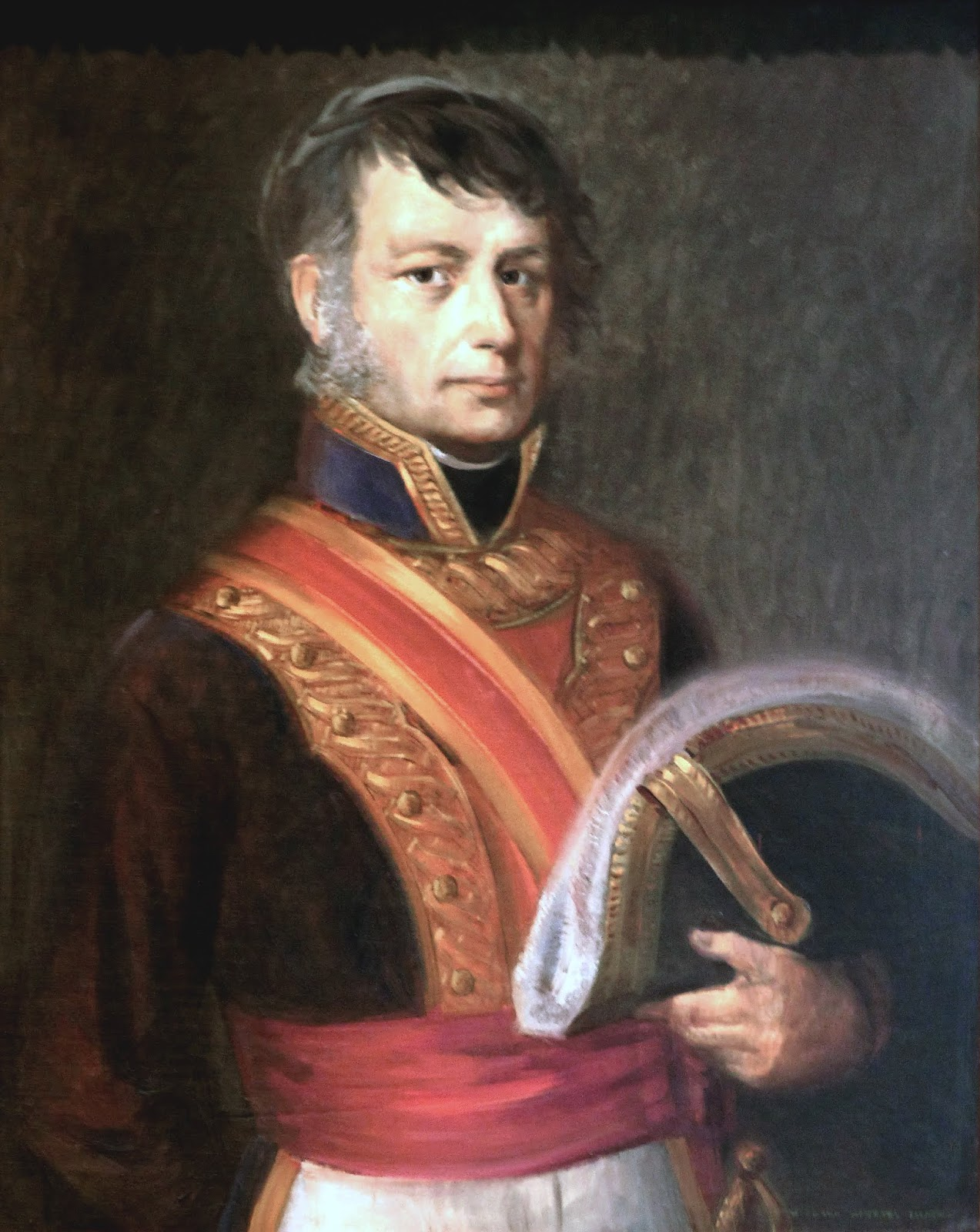
Don José María Estudillo, patriarch of the Estudillo family of California, served twice as commandant of the Presidio of San Diego.

The Mexican period of the U.S. southwest lasted from 1821 until 1848. The First Mexican Republic (1824-1835) had difficulties maintaining control over the region. Sparsely populated and far from the economic and political center in Mexico City, the northern territories of Alta California, Santa Fe de Nuevo Mexico, and Tejas were now free to engage in economic exchange with American traders, a practice which had been barred under the Spanish Empire. This newfound freedom resulted in the development of strong economic and social ties between the economic elites of Tejas, Alta California, and the United States.

Mexico's Constitution of 1824 guaranteed the equality of all Mexicans regardless of race. This had significant consequences in Alta California. In 1824, the Chumash of Santa Barbara coordinated a rebellion against the Mission system, protesting the inhumane conditions they continued to experience under the Jesuits. Simultaneously, the elites of the state, including the Vallejos, Alvarados, and Peraltas, urged for the total secularization of Mission lands. These agricultural families understood that if the Missions were secularized, the churches' large land-holdings would be distributed through land-grants by the regional government. The Mexican government eventually acquiesced, and the Mission system was abolished through the Secularization Act of 1833. As a result, the large land-holdings of the Missions were distributed through grants to the state's wealthiest families, including the Vallejos, Alvarados, Peraltas, Carillos, de la Guerras, and Picos. The California neophytes, rather than being freed, became laborers on the Ranchos the Californios created. These ranchos were compared to Plantations, and the indigenous laborers were often "treated worse than slaves".

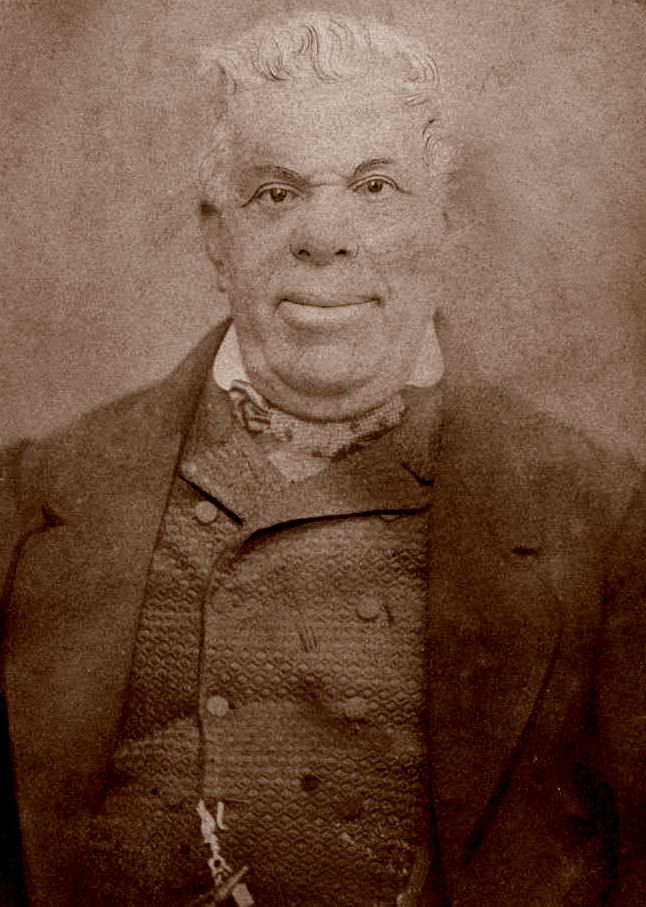
Pío Pico, a Californio ranchero and the last Mexican governor of Alta California

During this period, California and Texas were flooded by Anglo American businessmen. These migrants were welcomed into the region, and intermarriage between U.S. men and Mexican women was common practice, as it was a way to secure business loyalties through familial bonds. Yet the continual flood of Americans into the Northern territories grew into an ever-larger issue for the Mexican government. In 1835, less than 14 years after Mexico's independence from Spain, American ranchers in Tejas revolted against Mexico and declared themselves the Republic of Texas. Mexico's President Santa Anna led an army to put down the filibusteros, but after initial victories at The Alamo and Goliad, Santa Anna's army surrendered defeat on April 21, 1836. The Republic of Texas was never recognized as a sovereign state by the government of Mexico, which refused to recognize the treaties signed by Santa Anna, as he was a hostage when he signed them. In the new Republic of Texas, Tejanos faced severe educational and economic discrimination. Meanwhile, Mexico struggled to maintain its hold on political stability following the rebellion in Texas. In fact, the nation went through eighteen Presidential administrations from 1836 to 1845.

In 1845, newly elected U.S. President James K. Polk, aware of the lingering instability in Mexico and eager to expand the United States to the Pacific Ocean, propositioned Mexico to purchase Alta California and Santa Fe de Nuevo México. The offer was flatly rejected by the Mexican government. Polk responded by moving U.S. troops, led by Zachary Taylor, into the Nueces Strip to provoke the Mexican Army into attacking the U.S. in order to get Congress to declare war. Taylor set up camp in a disputed border territory and refused to leave, even after repeated warnings from the Mexican government. After several skirmishes in the disputed zone, the U.S. Congress declared war on May 13, 1846.

=== Mexican–American War ===
==== Conflict and battles ====
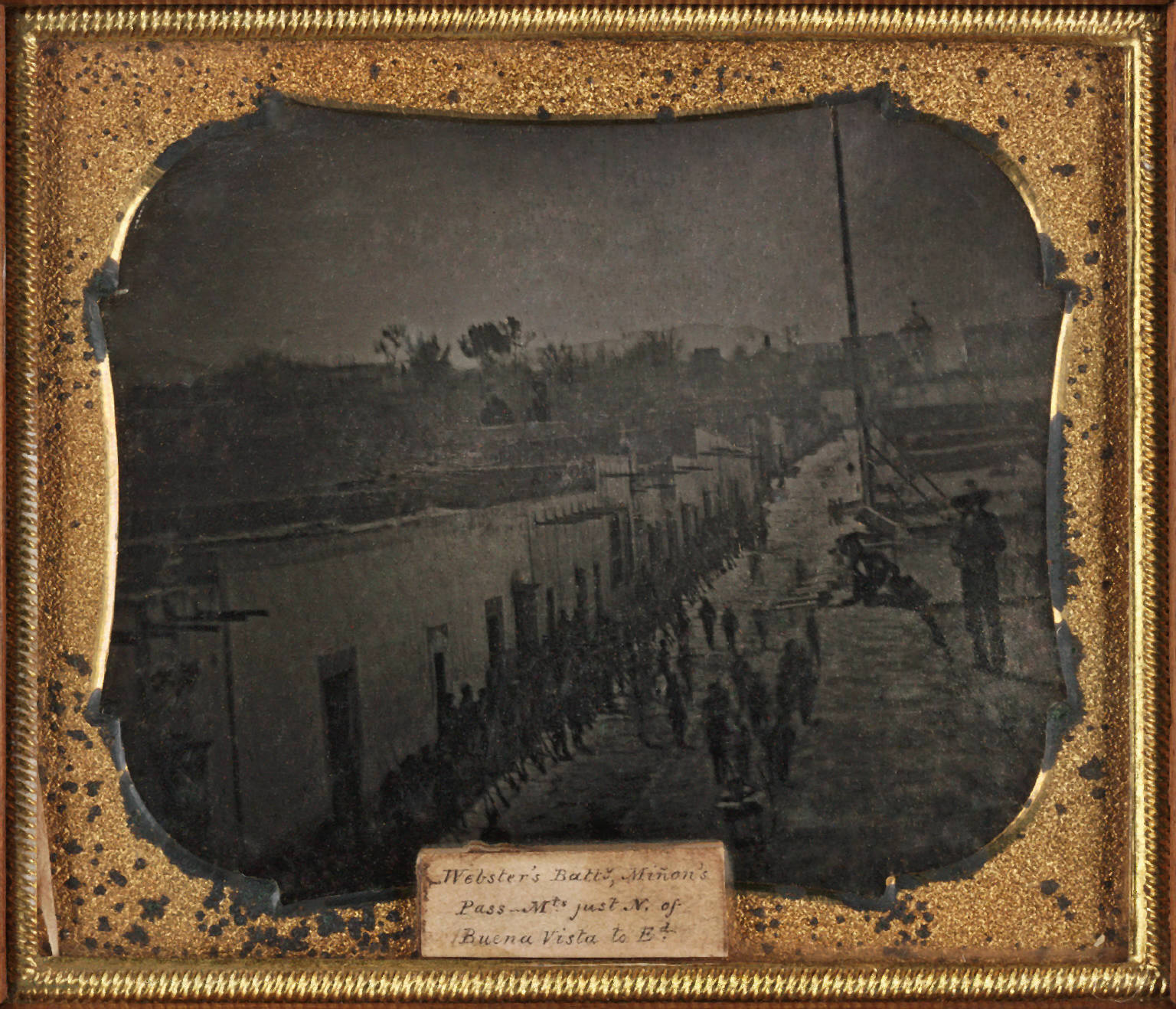
U.S. battalion in Saltillo

The Mexican–American War of 1846–48 would prove one of the most consequential events for Mexican Americans in United States history. In 1846, U.S. general Stephen W. Kearney marched into New Mexico, where he faced little resistance from the Mexican residents of Santa Fe. He installed local elite nuevomexicanos as the head of the provisional military government, which largely placated the residents of the territory. In his first public speech to residents, he proclaimed the forthcoming equality of an American regime, claiming that, "El fuerte, y el debil; el rico y el pobre; son iguales ante la ley ... protegeré los derechos de todos con igualdad" ("both the strong and the weak, the rich and the poor ... everybody is equal before the law and will be protected by the same equal rights").

New Mexico at first accepted the United States' military occupation without resistance, but within a year of Kearney's annexation of the territory, there was a widescale uprising. Nuevomexicano Pablo Montoya and Taos Puebloan Tomás Romero together led the 1847 Taos Revolt, which resulted in the execution of Charles Bent, Taos sheriff Stephen Lee, Judge Cornelio Vigil, Bent's brother-in-law Pablo Jaramillo, the attorney J. W. Leal, and a young boy named Narciso Beaubien. The U.S. military moved quickly to quash the revolt, and the fighting ended in New Mexico after the Nuevomexicanos' subsequent defeats in the Battle of Red River Canyon, the Battle of Las Vegas, and the Battle of Cienega Creek.

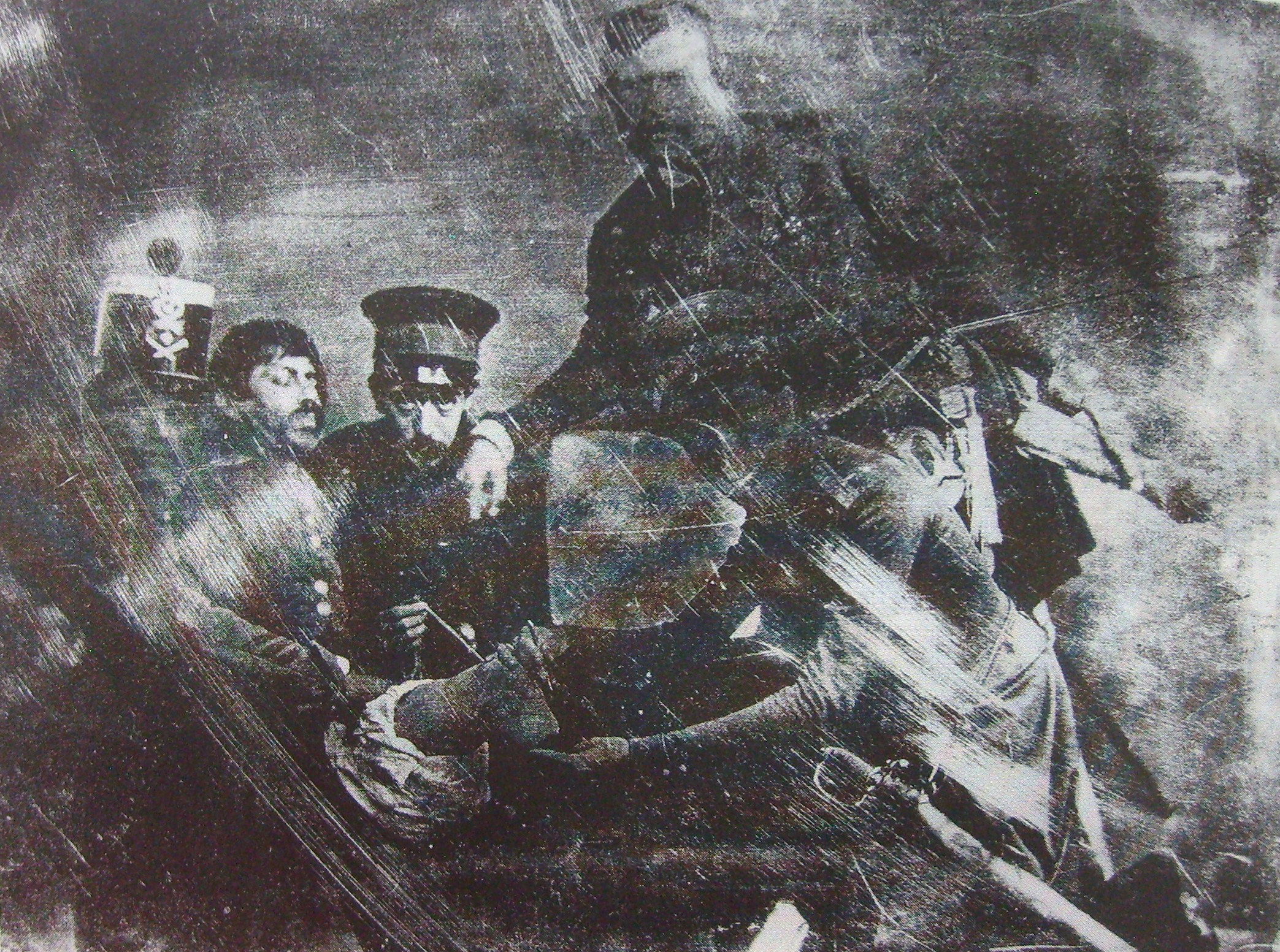
Battlefield during the U.S.-Mexico War (April 18, 1847)

In California, residents also fought the American army. In 1847, Californios staged battles throughout Southern California against the American conquest, including the Battle of Los Angeles and the Battle of San Pasqual (present-day San Diego). The United States Navy, believing that cutting off supplies to the Californios would ensure their defeat, implemented blockades along the Pacific Coast and Gulf of Mexico. As a result of these actions, the Navy's Pacific Squadron subsequently conquered Monterey, San Francisco, and San Diego, virtually guaranteeing victory for the U.S. in California. The war ended on September 8, 1847, when Winfield Scott took control over Mexico City in the Battle for Mexico City. The U.S. and Mexico soon after entered negotiations for conditions of surrender.

==== Treaty of Guadalupe Hidalgo ====
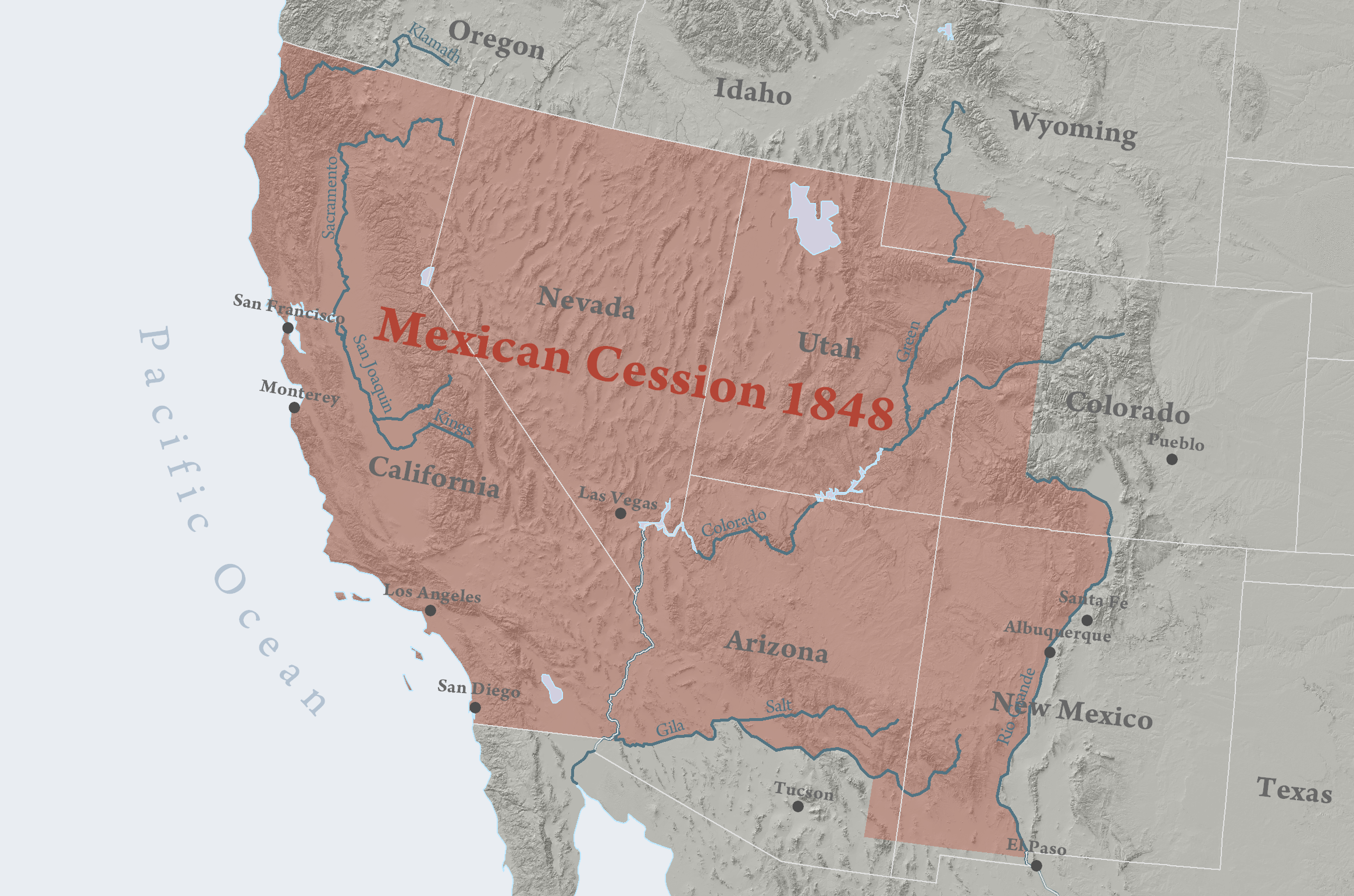
Lands ceded to the U.S. through the Treaty of Guadalupe Hidalgo

On July 4, 1848, the United States and Mexico ratified the Treaty of Guadalupe Hidalgo, which formally ended the war. Under the conditions of defeat, Mexico also ceded more 525,000 square miles of territory. The treaty guaranteed full citizenship for all former-Mexican citizens who requested it, as well as formal U.S. citizenship to all who remained in the U.S. territories for one full year after the signing of the treaty. The full text of the treaty also included Article X, a provision which would have guaranteed rights to all holders of Mexican land-grants. Fearing that Article X would give Tejanos too much protection over their land, the U.S. Congress quietly removed it from the final version, claiming that it was "redundant". The law of the treaty guaranteed the "treaty citizens" full rights to their land if they were able to prove ownership, but the ability to prove ownership proved difficult.

Furthermore, the treaty was signed without any formal legal guarantees that all Mexican citizens would be treated as citizens under U.S. law. Under the Constitution of 1824, all Mexicans, regardless of their race, had gained recognition as citizens, yet the United States, under the Naturalization Act of 1790, only recognized "white persons" as eligible for citizenship through naturalization. The treaty thus legally classified Mexicans as "white" in order to allow them U.S. citizenship, yet this was applied only to the Spanish Mexican elite, mestizos, and assimilated Indigenous peoples. Without explicit legal protection, all unassimilated and autonomous Native Americans in the new territories were thereby subjected to prior United States' case law relating to "Amerindian" tribes.

== Early-American period ==
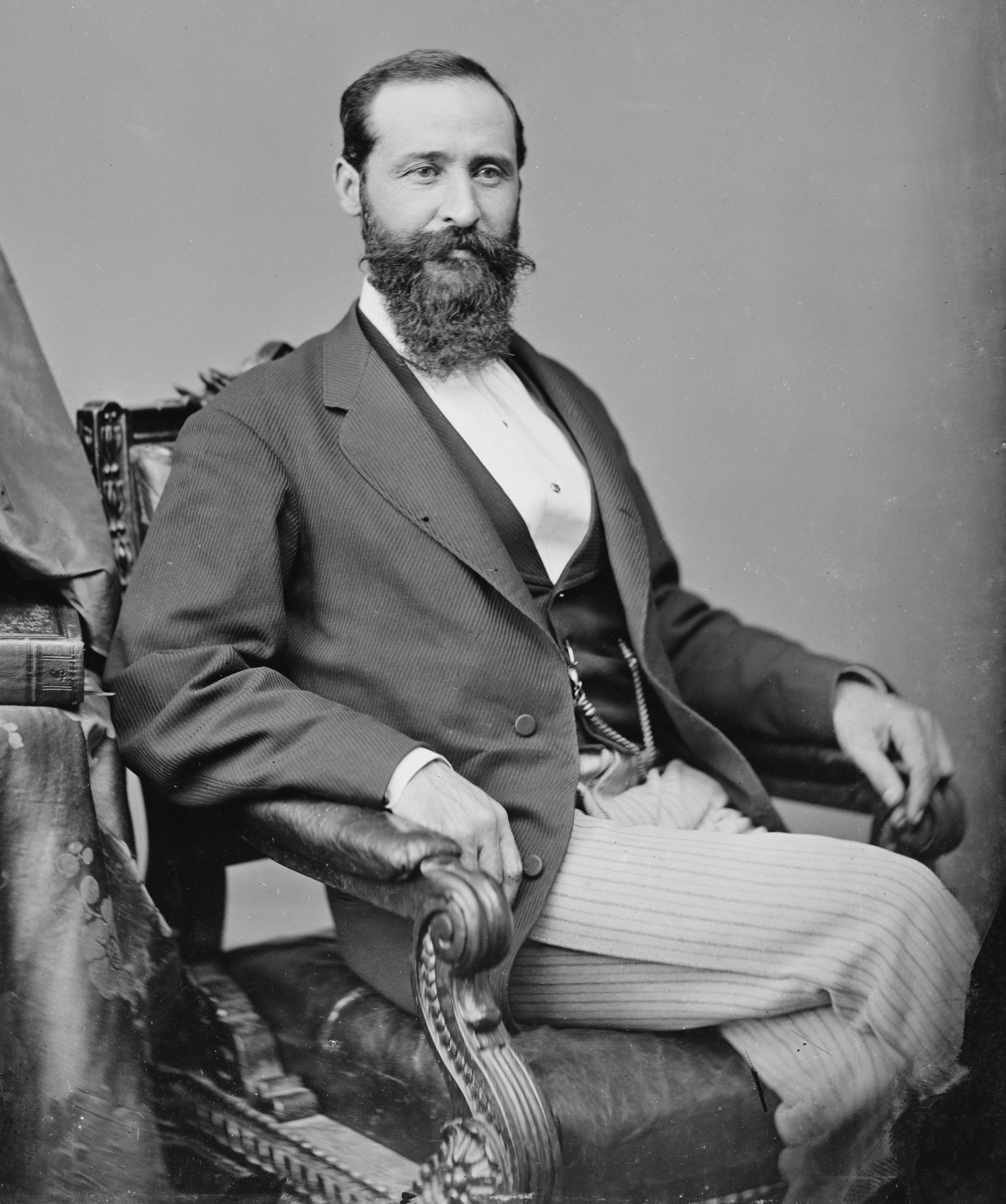
José Francisco Chaves, territorial representative for the New Mexico Territory

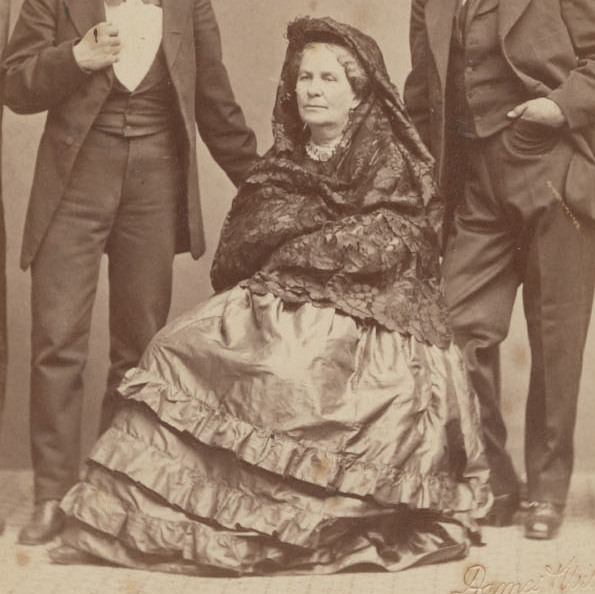
Angustias de la Guerra, a Californio author who played an important role in defending women's property rights in the California Constitution.

The early-American period in the U.S. southwest was a period marked by violence and land loss. Under the terms of the Treaty of Guadalupe Hidalgo, all Mexicans were granted formal citizenship rights as American citizens, yet widespread dissatisfaction emerged amongst the Mexican Americans. Despite the treaty pledges of full and equal citizenship, rampant discrimination and violence were immediate and widespread.

Realizing the potential dissatisfaction which the former Mexicans would face as American citizens, Mexico's president José Joaquín de Herrera issued a recolonization plan in August 1848, which promised economic resources and land for any former-Mexican who returned to Mexico. The commission hired three commissioners to recruit repatriates. Father Ramón Ortiz y Miera, the New Mexico commissioner, encouraged resettlement by criticizing the inferior status of the "treaty citizens". Such arguments had a strong resonance for the former Mexicans, as twenty-five percent of the country's Mexican American population repatriated after the war.

Yet, the United States, despite guaranteeing the rights of former Mexicans to return to Mexico, developed legal arguments in order to institute formal barriers against this resettlement movement. The U.S. Secretary of War George W. Crawford even claimed that repatriation was prohibited. Because New Mexico served as the primary buffer between American settlers and indigenous groups, the U.S. believed it was in their best interest if the treaty citizens remained in the U.S. to maintain a "civilized" presence in the region and protect against Native encroachment.

=== Society ===
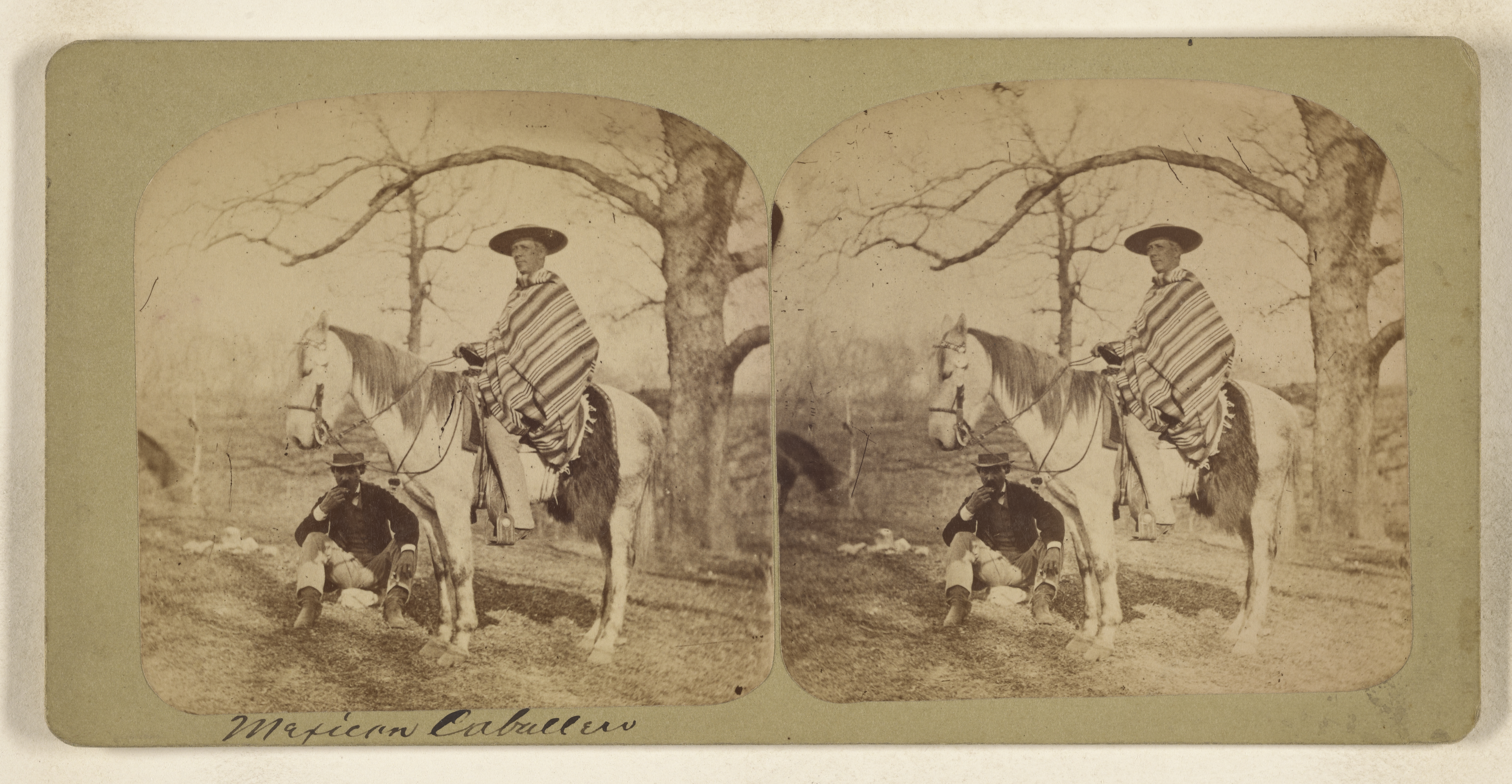
A vaquero in San Antonio, Texas

In 1850, the United States census counted approximately 80,000 Mexican treaty citizens living across California, Texas, and New Mexico. New Mexico was the largest United States territory at the time, with around 61,547 inhabitants, about 95% of whom were former Mexican citizens. The majority of the Nuevomexicanos lived in rural communities with populations of fewer than 1,000 people. According to the 1850 census, the three most common occupations held by Nuevomexicanos were farmer, laborer, and servant.

In South Texas, Tejanos lived in a three-tiered society. At the top were the landed elite, who owned huge ranchos, many of which had been granted by the Spanish colonial empire and turned into haciendas. The elite retained their economic dominance through cattle ranching. Small landowners occupied the second rung of the South Texas economic and social ladder. These landowners lived in one-room adobe houses and spent most of their time caring for their horses and cattle. Finally, South Texas had a third lower class composed primarily of peóns, vaqueros, and cartmen. Peóns had a status above slaves in antebellum Texas but below that of free men. Peóns worked at the direction of the patróns—planting and harvesting crops, herding goats, digging wells, and doing any sort of manual labor necessary. They lived in tiny one-room jacales, huts with walls of mud or any other material available and thatched roofs. Anglo migrants to Texas believed the jacales were evidence of the Tejanos' "sub-human" and "primitive" nature.

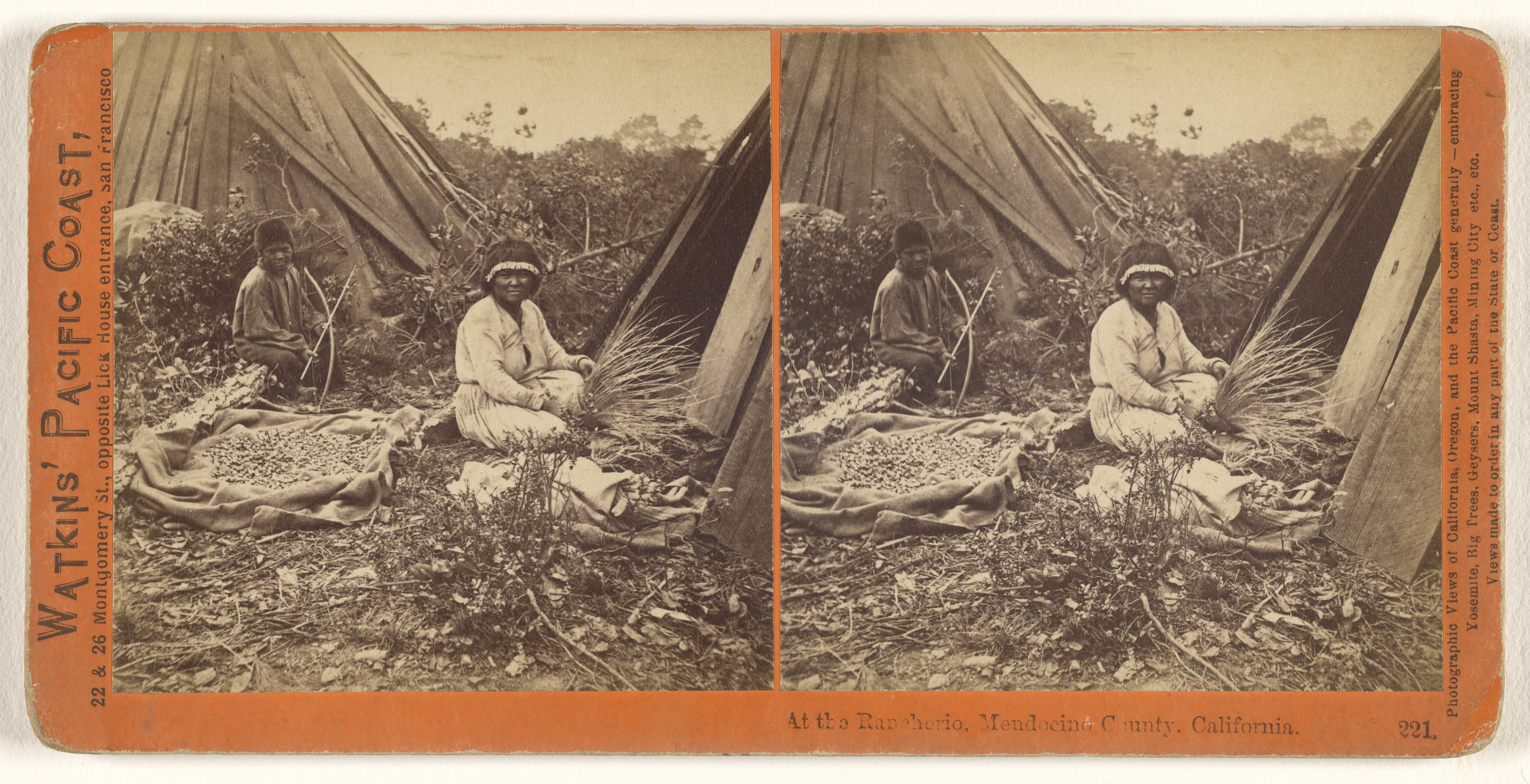
A Pomo woman at the Mendocino Rancho in California

In California, native-born californios mostly lived in small farming and ranching communities in the south. The two largest cities in 1850 were Los Ángeles, with a population of 3,500, and Santa Barbara, where 1,185 people lived. While elite Californios, such as Pablo de la Guerra and Luis María Peralta, held political and economic power in the state, they represented only 3 percent of the population in 1850. The vast majority of landed Californios were subsistence farmers who based their livelihood on their small plots of land. In the southern coastal regions, business-ownership and manual labor were also common occupations for general Californios. For the Indigenous peoples of California, the Treaty of Guadalupe Hidalgo's failure to ensure full citizenship and protections had dire consequences. They were subjected to a systematic genocide, funded by the state of California. The California Genocide killed around 90% of California's Native population during the early-American period, clearing the way for full-scale Anglo colonization.

=== Government ===
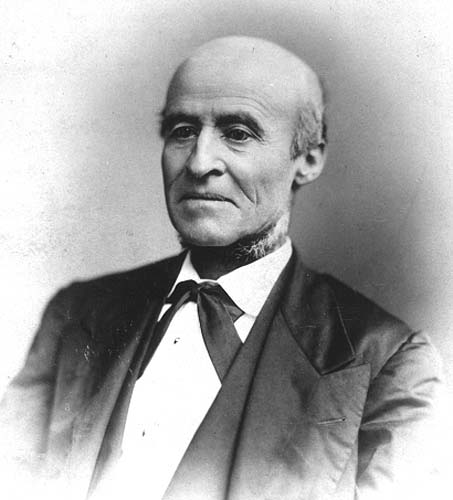
José Manuel Gallegos, delegate from the Territory of New Mexico to the U.S. House of Representatives

Over time, the social, economic, and legal position of the Spanish Mexicans diminished, largely through political disenfranchisement and large-scale land loss. These two processes were facilitated through the elimination of political, linguistic, and property rights. In two decades, Americans seized complete control over the apparatuses of political power across the U.S. Southwest.

José Manuel Gallegos was sworn into Congress in 1853 as the first nuevomexicano territorial representative to Congress. He spoke only Spanish, which was not a problem for his first two terms. After he successfully ran for reelection in 1856, however, his bilingual opponent Miguel A. Otero, contested the election results. Otero claimed Gallegos' inability to speak English disqualified him. Gallego made an impassioned self-defense in Spanish on the House floor, where he protested the "disappointment" he felt from the "sneers" of his colleagues. Nevertheless, Otero's bid was successful, and he replaced Gallego as the territorial representative of New Mexico.

California's first U.S. senator, John C. Frémont, introduced legislation for the federal government to arbitrate land claim settlements. After the removal of Article X from the Treaty of Guadalupe Hidalgo, treaty citizens were stripped of any formal protection of their land rights. After gold was discovered at Sutter's Mill in Coloma, California in 1848, a massive migration flooded the state, sparking the Gold Rush. By 1852, the population of California had grown from 8,000 in 1848 to 260,000. These gold miners were largely landless and asserted ownership over California lands. The California Land Act of 1851, also known as the Gwin Act, after California senator William M. Gwin, created a presidentially appointed commission to settle disputed claims between the landholders and Anglo miners. During the California gold rush Mexicans from Sonora and Chileans were among the first to arrive and were also among the most experienced in mining. Many Anglo miners learned the basics of mining from Chileans and Sonorans. Mexicans, Chileans and Peruvians tended to group together. Since Chilean often assumed leadership position Spanish-speaking mining groups "Chilean" was used an umbrella term by Anglos for any Spanish-speaker in the gold rush. As anti-foreigner laws (e.g. Foreign Miners' Tax) begun to be used selectively against Mexicans and Chileans peoples these nationalities tended to solidarize.

=== Land ===
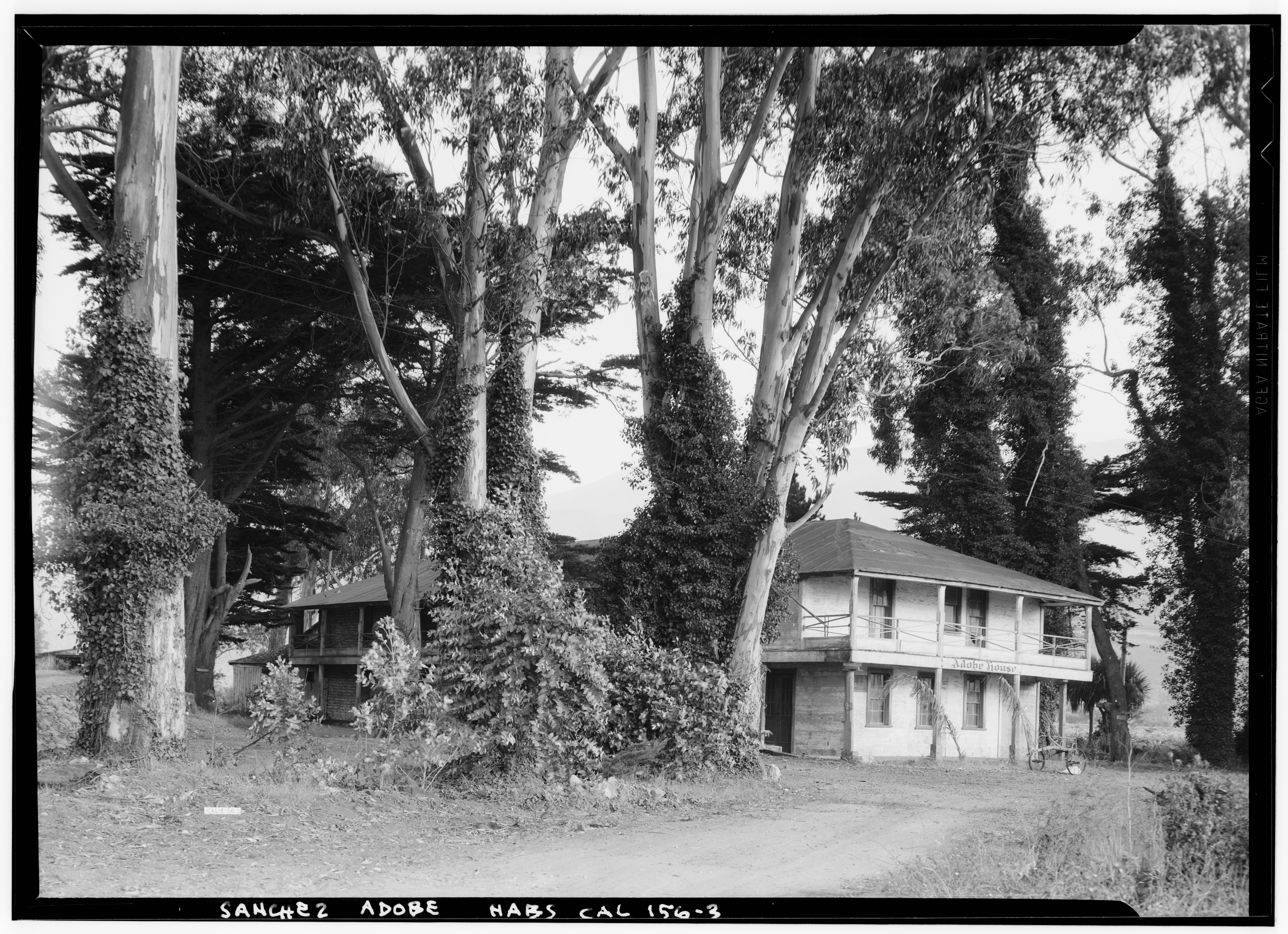
The Sanchez Adobe, part of the Rancho San Pedro, purchased by U.S. General Edward Kirkpatrick.

In California's post-war years, land proved to be the most contentious and sought-after commodity. The California Land Act of 1851 established a commission to determine the validity of Spanish and Mexican land grants. In order to prove ownership over the property, landowners needed to both provide evidence of the initial grant, as well as submit proof they had made "structural and pastoral" improvements to the land. If they could not, Anglo squatters were free to claim ownership if they had "improved the land", a contentious claim which was often difficult to disprove. Additionally, because many of the initial Spanish and Mexican diseños" grants were vague, merely describing the natural boundaries of the property, contestations over the boundaries of ranchos were difficult for the Californios to prove. All documents submitted in support of a claim also needed to be translated into English. Some firms, like Halleck, Peachy & Billings, gained popular reputations as "friends to the Mexicans" for helping the Californios navigate the new American court system, but most land lawyers used the situation to their advantage, drawing out the cases and charging exorbitant fees for their services.

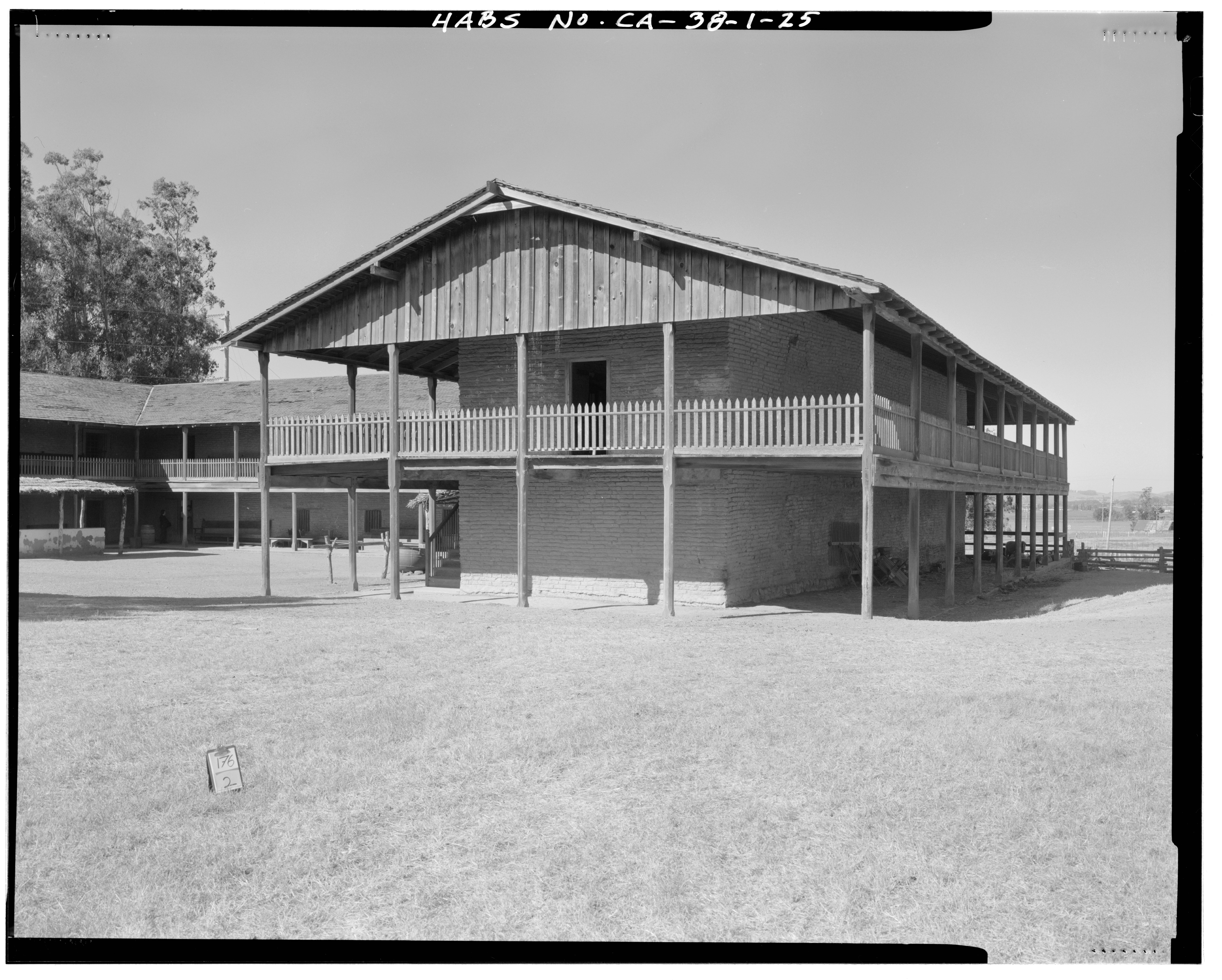
Rancho Petaluma, which was subdivided and sold by Mariano G. Vallejo to pay for his attorneys' fees.

In most instances, land claim cases often proved simply too expensive for most Californios to litigate. While the majority of cases were ultimately ruled in favor of the Californios, the average wait-time for a case to be resolved was seventeen years. During that time, most Californio families were forced to sell portions of their property to pay their attorneys' fees. In addition, all land commission hearings were held in San Francisco, which created an additional and expensive barrier for Southern California landowners. Mexican American landowners, in general, faced often insurmountable odds in proving ownership of their lands, which some argue was the intent of the convoluted system. Mariano Guadalupe Vallejo wrote, "It requires a lot of work and money that I don't have to locate [possible witnesses], and afterwards to pay for notarized affidavits and English translations for each."

Some Californios, however, attempted to use their positions of influence and power to fight against the legal discrimination. Pablo de la Guerra, a Santa Barbara landowner, asserted his political influence as a state senator and then lieutenant governor to vocally critique the American legal system, which treated Mexicans as a "conquered and inferior race". De la Guerra complained that the testimony of white people was taken more seriously in the court system than that of Mexicans; he said, "A disgraceful distinction between white testimony and ours was indelicately paraded." De la Guerra would have to fight even to maintain his right to hold political office; the landmark case People v. de la Guerra decided that despite charges otherwise, De la Guerra could hold political office in the United States. Nevertheless, Anglos came to dominate the political and economic landscape of California, as not even one Mexican family retained their wealth in the early-American period.

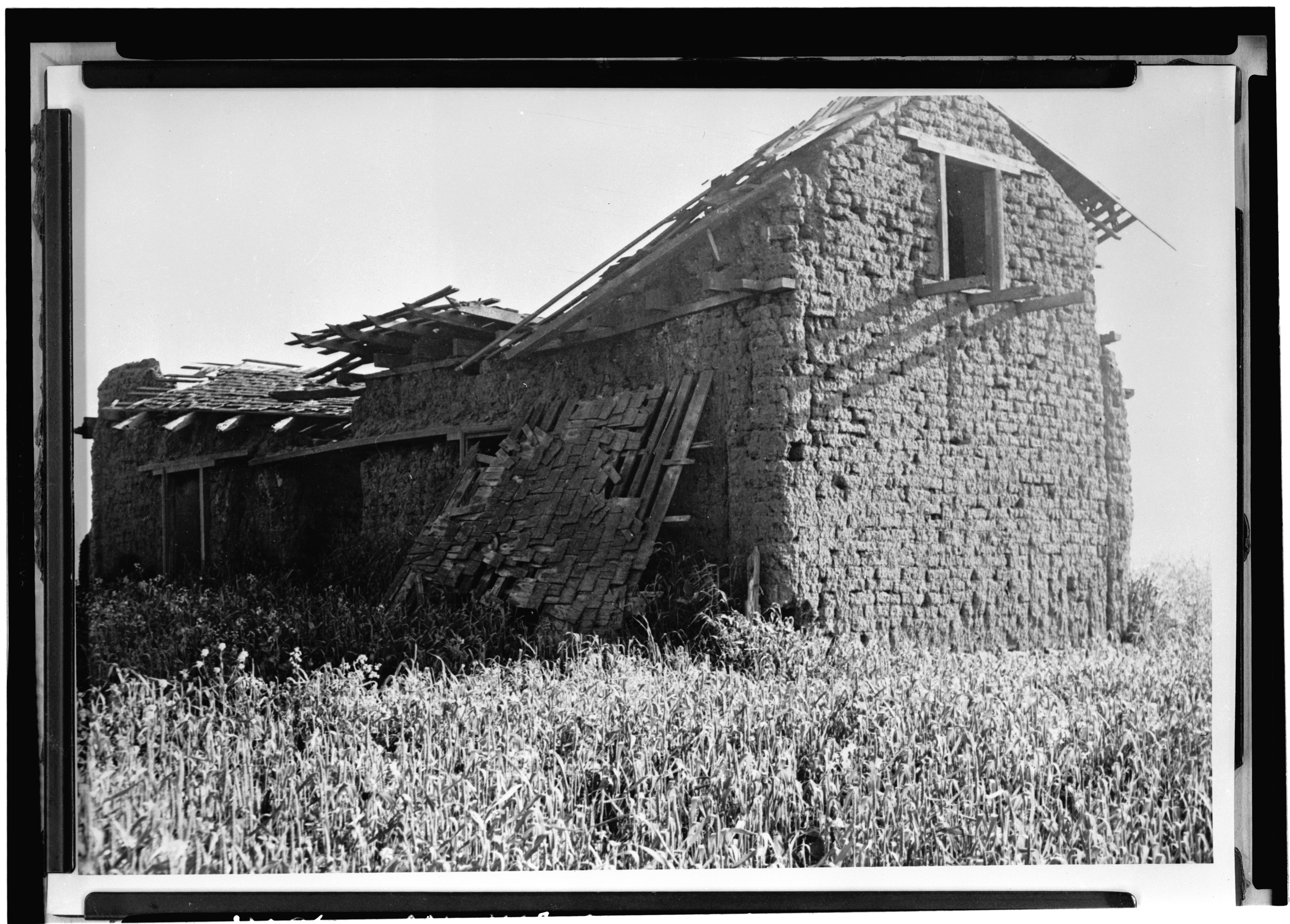
Rancho Agua Caliente in Fremont, California, which was subdivided and purchased by Leland Stanford.

In Texas, land grants were never subject to a federally legislated commission. Because Texas had attained statehood in 1845, it retained jurisdiction over the entirety of its border regions and thus claimed exemption from the Treaty of Guadalupe Hidalgo. The Texas state government thus took the matter of land grants into its own hands, when governor Peter H. Bell appointed William H. Bourland and James Miller to determine the validity of Spanish and Mexican land holdings in the state. At its first hearing in Webb County, the Bourland-Miller Commission faced significant opposition from the local Mexican American landowners, who claimed that the commission had been established in order to seize the property of Tejanos and take away their full rights. Miller and Bourland were able to win over the landowning elite of the Laredo area, however, by conducting an "impartial" proceeding, which resulted in all the Tejano families retaining their landholdings. In the rest of the state, however, the commission was less favorable to the land-owning claims of the Tejanos. In areas of Southwest Texas, fewer than half of all land grants were recognized as legitimate by the commission, and many of the ones which were recognized as legitimate were already owned by Anglo Texans.

=== Violence ===
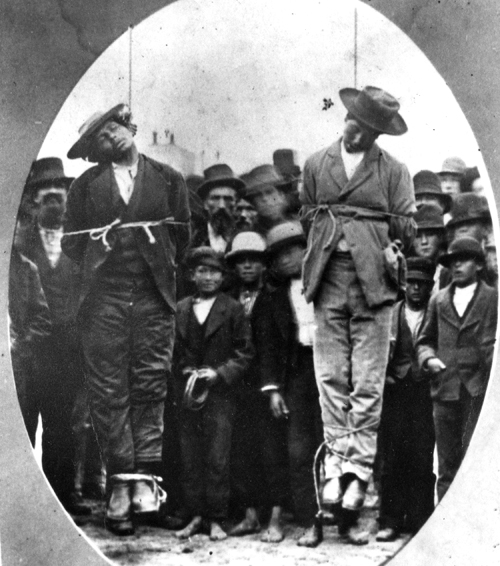
Two Mexican American men lynched in Santa Cruz, California

In addition to using legalistic maneuvers to seize economic and political control, American settlers also used physical violence as a tactic to control the conquered Mexican American population. In California, Mexican Americans were driven out of their homes, forced out of mining camps in gold-rich areas, barred from testifying in court, and gradually segregated into barrios. There was resistance to this violence, as men like Tiburcio Vásquez turned to banditry to resist the domination of the Anglos. As a method to keep Mexicans in their place, the American settlers lynched Mexicans. Between 1848 and 1860, at least 163 Mexicans were lynched in California alone.

Between 1848 and 1879, Mexican Americans across the United States were lynched at an unprecedented rate of 473 per 100,000 of population. Most of these lynchings were not instances of "frontier justice"— out of 597 total victims, only 64 were lynched in areas which lacked a formal judicial system. The majority of lynching victims were denied access to a trial while others were convicted in unfair trials. Mexican Americans had no avenues for justice in the early-American period. As a result, many of the folk heroes of this period were considered to be outlaws: robbers, social bandits, and freedom fighters.

In Texas, Mexican Americans also resisted the violence of the U.S. settlers. Juan Cortina began the First Cortina War in 1859 when he shot the Brownsville town Marshall, Robert Shears, for brutalizing Cortina's former employees. Cortina raided and occupied the town with a squad of armed men. They held the city for several months, until they were attacked by a joint effort between the Texas Rangers and U.S. Army, led by John Ford and Samuel Heintzelman. The final battle was fought in March 1860, when Cortina was defeated.

== Late-19th century ==
=== Civil War ===
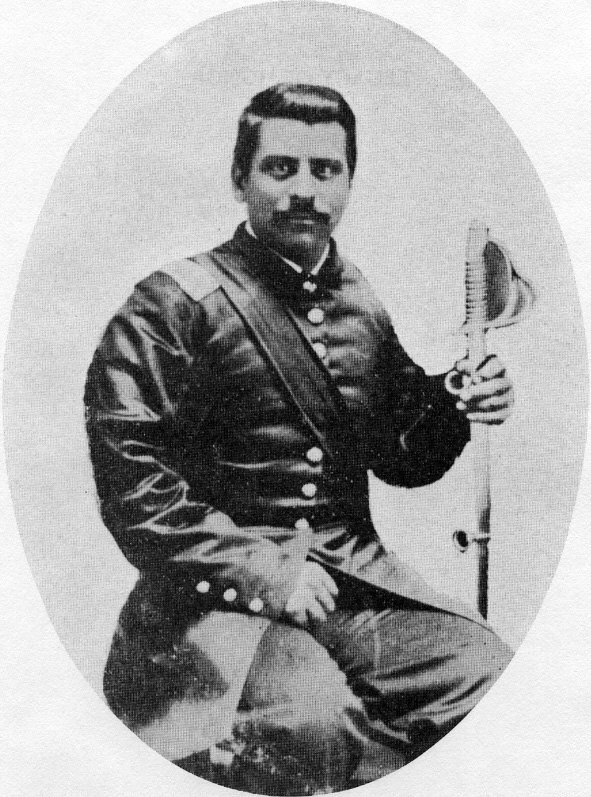
Cpt. Rafael Chacón of the Union New Mexico Volunteers

Mexican Americans played a major role in the American Civil War (1861-1865). Texas, which was home to a significant portion of the nation's Mexican American population, seceded from the Union and joined the Confederate States of America in February 1861. In the Arizona and New Mexico territories, many elite Mexican American families held views sympathetic to the Confederacy. In New Mexico, wealthy Mexican American crop-farm families openly supported the slave-owners of the South, perhaps due to their own reliance on the forced labor of Native Americans.

Across the country, Mexican Americans felt resentment toward the U.S. because of the ethnic discrimination they experienced after the Mexican American War. The result was a mixed dispersion of support and opposition toward the United States. In New Mexico and California, support among Mexican Americans was split. Many wealthy landowners in southern New Mexico supported the Confederacy, while most northern New Mexicans fought for the Union Army. In California, Union support tended to be stronger in Northern California, while many Mexican Americans in Southern California leaned toward the Confederacy. Nevertheless, California remained in the Union.

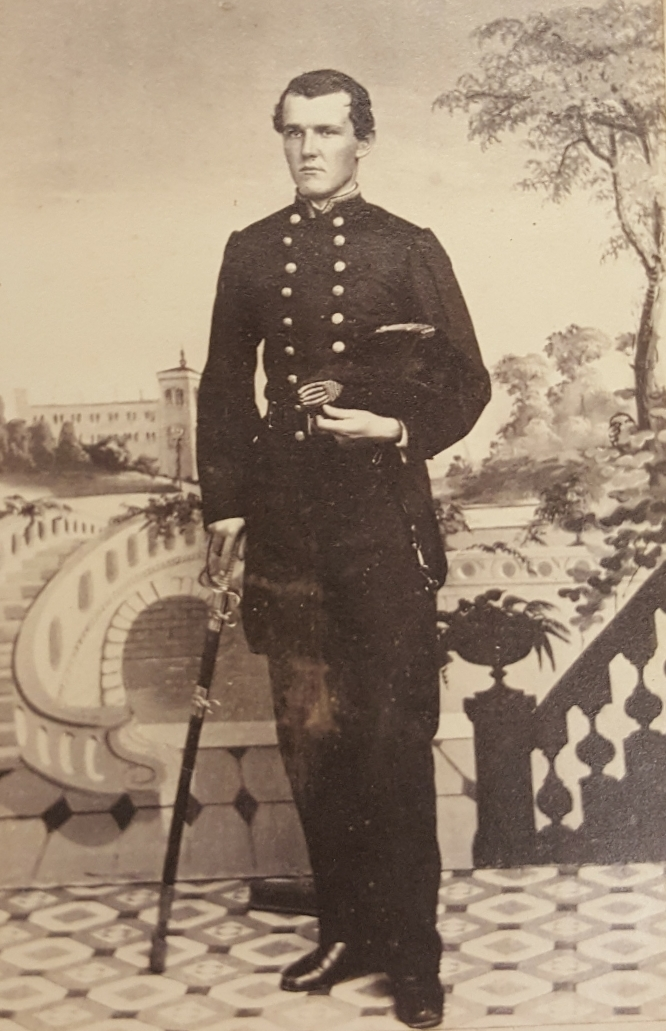
Rear Admiral Cipriano Andrade, a third engineer who served the Union

The Confederates, however, believed that opening a route to California would aid their cause. In summer 1861, John R. Baylor led the Confederates into Mesilla and declared the southern portion of New Mexico as the Confederate Territory of Arizona. He then marched into Tucson and declared Southern Arizona the second district of the Arizona Territory. In response to this aggression, President Abraham Lincoln appointed Henry Connelly - an Anglo politician who married into a Mexican American family – as the territorial governor of New Mexico. Inspiring confidence amongst the Nuevomexicanos, the Union army was soon filled by Mexican Americans. The New Mexico units, known as the New Mexico Volunteers, were led by Brigadier General Diego Archuleta, Lt. Col. Manuel Chávez, Lt. Col. Francisco Perea, Col. José Guadalupe Gallegos, J. Francisco Chaves, and Cpt. Rafael Chacón. This massive Mexican American army was able to destroy the Confederate hold on New Mexico by March 28, 1862, when Lt. Col. Manuel Chávez and his troops destroyed the Confederate supply train on Glorieta Pass and forced the Confederate soldiers to abandon the field. Often called the "Gettysburg of the West", the Battle of Glorieta Pass effectively ended the Confederates attempts to take over the Western United States. With the Confederates' surrender of the Territory, Mexican Americans from California were responsible for clearing out all Confederates supporters, including French imperialists who entered the U.S. during Maximilian's rule in Mexico.

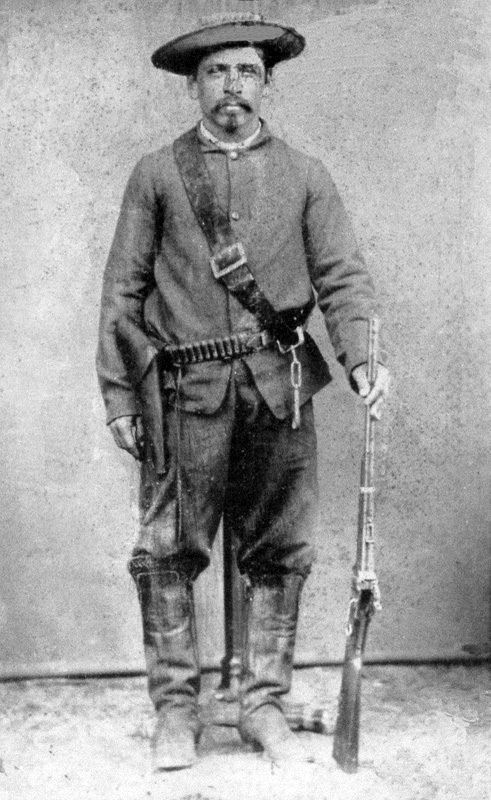
A Tejano Union soldier

As the last Confederate stronghold of the Southwest, Texas played a major role in Civil War battles. Wealthy Tejano ranchers, such as Santos Benavides, were the strongest Texas supporters of the Confederacy. Nevertheless, many working class Tejanos fought for the Union army, as they had no interest in living in a social system predicated on unfree labor.

Some Tejanos, such as Antonio Ochoa, had fought against the Texas Confederates from the time of secession. In 1861, Ochoa and a group of 40 men marched to the Zapata County courthouse and sought to prevent the town officials from swearing their allegiance to the Confederacy. Ochoa and his men were immediately attacked by Confederate troops and forced to flee into Mexico. There they met and recruited Juan Cortina, who'd been forced out of Texas at the end of the First Cortina War. Ochoa and Cortina together launched multiple military and economic attacks in South Texas, targeting supply lines, and even assassinating a Confederate county judge. After each attack, they fled back to the safety of Mexico, waited for a short time, and then moved back into Texas for their next attack. This continued until Ochoa was executed by the brother of Santos Benavides.

The final battle of the U.S. Civil War was fought in Texas. One month after Robert E. Lee's surrender at Appomattox in April 1865, Union forces marched toward Brownsville. Tejano Confederates responded near the mouth of the Rio Grande and attacked the Union soldiers. While the Confederates won this final victory, they were the ultimate losers of the war. An estimated 20,000 Latinos fought in the Civil War.

=== Reconstruction era ===
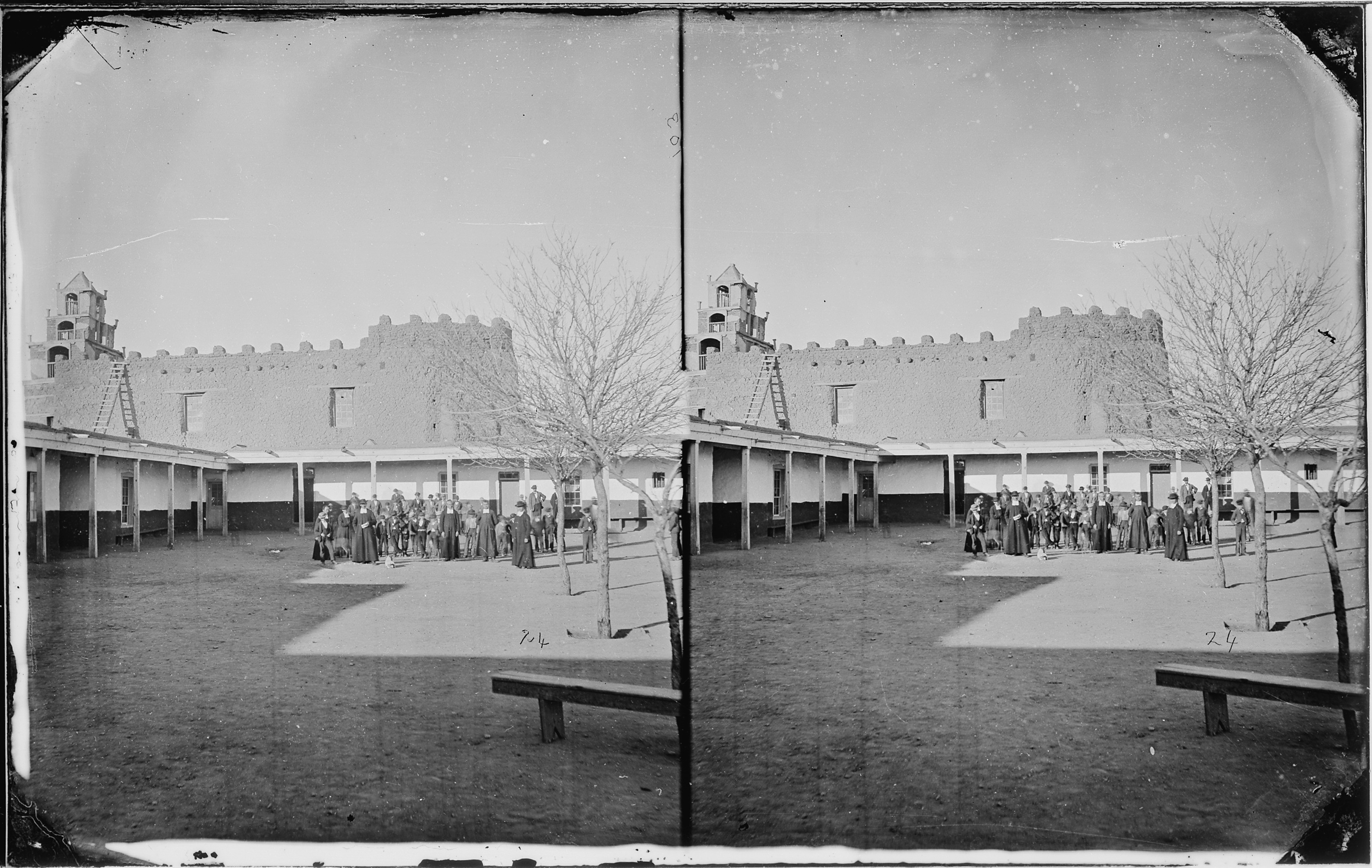
San Miguel, New Mexico in 1873

Despite the significant contributions of Mexican Americans in the American Civil War, the community faced a resurgence of discrimination in the Reconstruction era. In the 1870s, the New Mexico Territory saw a massive influx of Anglo-American settlers and land speculators. The Territory legislature, fearing a Gold Rush-style land grab, petitioned Congress for protections. In their 1872 memorial to Congress, the New Mexico legislators argued for a change in federal land laws, which stipulated that in the case of a dispute, the owners of the land must present evidence of their original land grant in both English and Spanish. The legislators argued this provided an undue burden to Nuevomexicanos, since in the territory, "very few ... understand the English language." As migration increased over the course of the decade, the legislature issued more memorials, stressing the need for a Board of Commissioners to settle disputed land claims.

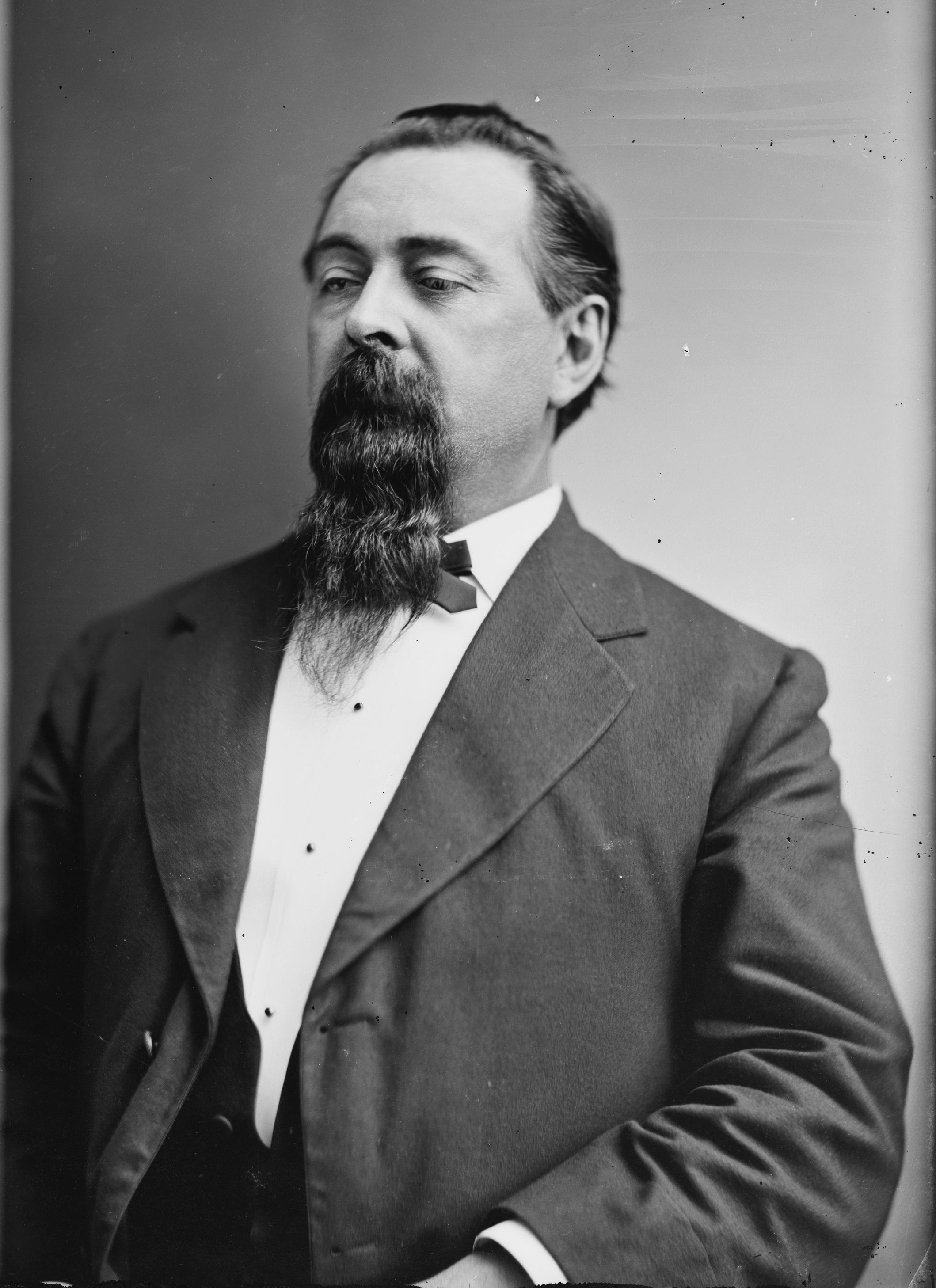
Romualdo Pacheco is the only Mexican to serve as Governor of California since the United States conquest of California.

In Texas, disputes between Tejanos and white Americans resulted in open racial conflict. The Skinning Wars, also known as the Second Cortina War, erupted in the 1870s. After the Civil War, Texas ranchers found themselves with a massive surplus of cattle, and this resulted in a precipitous drop in the price of beef. The cost of cowhides, however, remained relatively high. Because of the high price of hides, disputes soon emerged over mavericks, which, in this period, were often left to grange on the open range. These disputes resulted in "skinning raids", where young Mexican men would round up disputed herds of cattle and skin them all at once. In retaliation, white Americans in South Texas organized "vigilance committees", which quickly gained notoriety for their violent tactics. In Corpus Christi, the Anglo vigilance committee raided Tejano ranches, where they would kill every Mexican male, burn down all their buildings, and force any survivors across the border to Mexico. Texas Ranger Leander H. McNelly, a former Confederate, imposed punishments against the Tejanos he believed were responsible for the "raids", formally ending the race war.

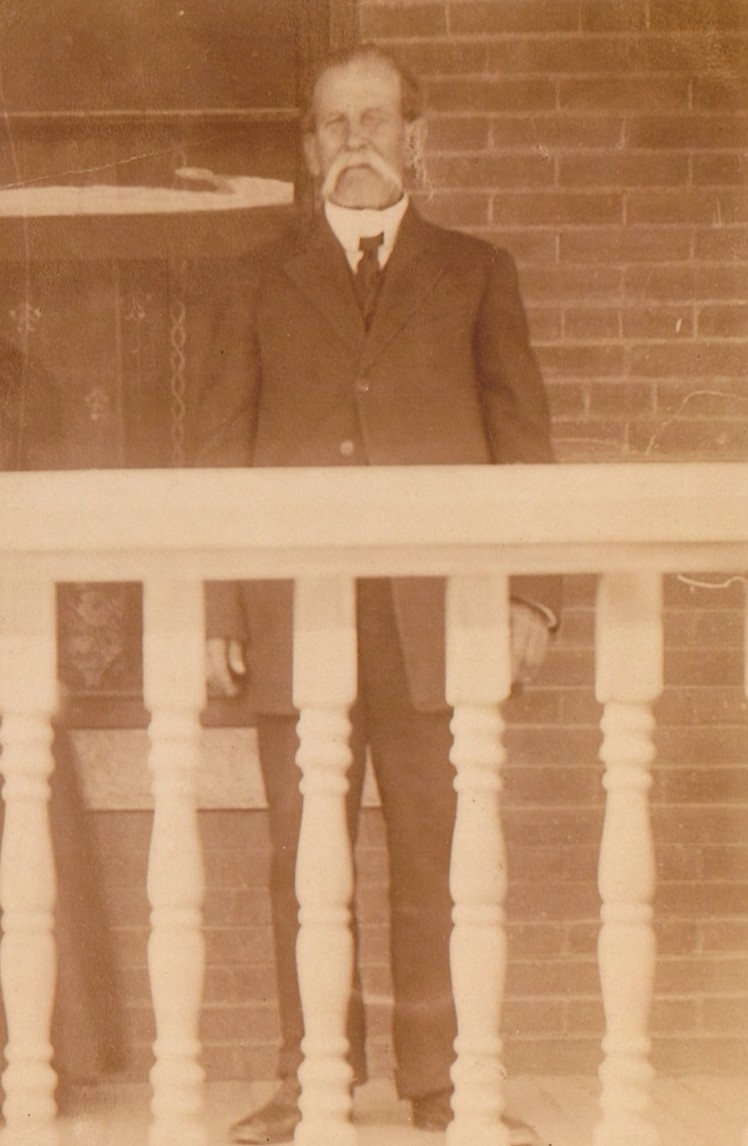
José Mauro Luján, a San Elizario resident and participant in the San Elizario Salt War of 1877

In West Texas, violent ethnoracial tensions exploded by 1877. In September of that year, San Elizario District Judge Charles Howard sought to charge collection fees from Mexicans, Tejanos, and Tiguas when they harvested from local salt beds. The residents were outraged by the fees, as the salt beds had been considered a public resource for many generations. After Howard arrested two residents who tried to collect salt without paying, the residents revolted against Howard. Known as the San Elizario Salt War, this revolt resulted in the death of Howard and four other white Americans. In response, the white residents of San Elizario called upon the Texas Rangers, who, along with the U.S. Army, suppressed the rebellion and reasserted Anglo power in the region.

Further south, Richard King continued to actively consolidate the King Ranch in the late-1870s, usually through violent and coercive tactics directed against his Tejano ranchero neighbors. In 1878, one newspaper commentator complained that King's neighbors "mysteriously vanish whilst his territory extends over entire countries". King, however, did not work alone. As his wealth grew, so did his political influence, and the territorial consolidation of Texas ranch land was made possible through the Texas Rangers. The Rangers in this period took violent measures against Tejano ranch owners to scare them into selling their land. In fact, the Rangers were known popularly in the late-1870s as los riches de la Kineña, an allusion to the belief they acted as King's private security force.

=== Gilded Age ===
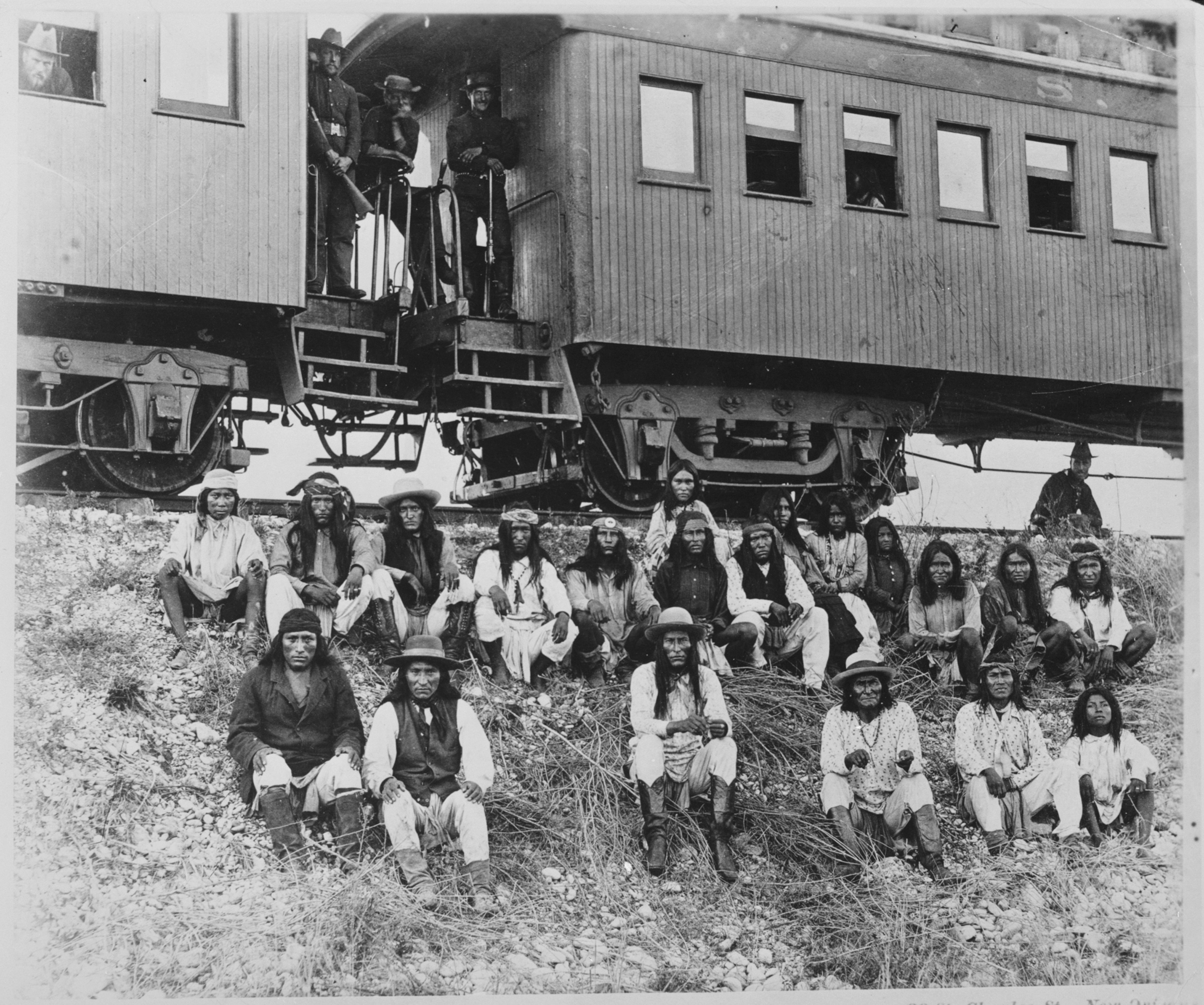
Apache men on the Southern Pacific Railway near the Nueces River, Texas

The 1880s for Mexicans Americans was a period of substantial change, marked especially by the emergence of the Southern Pacific Railway. In El Paso, the Southern Pacific reached the city in 1881, at which point it birthed an immediate economic and industrial revolution, as new industries emerged in mining, smelting, and construction. The economic boom was felt throughout the U.S. Southwest and Northern Mexico, and it brought new national and transnational migrants into the region.

In addition to Mexicans entering the U.S. from Mexico, Chinese laborers came from San Francisco, African Americans fled from the Jim Crow South, and European Americans came from the East Coast. The influx of new capital and immigrant labor into the region helped transform Texas from a barren terrain into a hub of international commerce, and El Paso emerged as the region's primary economic hub and an international commercial depot. Nevertheless, racial violence continued. Mary Jaques, a British tourist who spent two years in Central Texas in the 1880s, wrote that the murder of Tejanos "carried a sort of immunity with it", as Mexicans appeared to be "treated like a dog, or, perhaps, not so well".

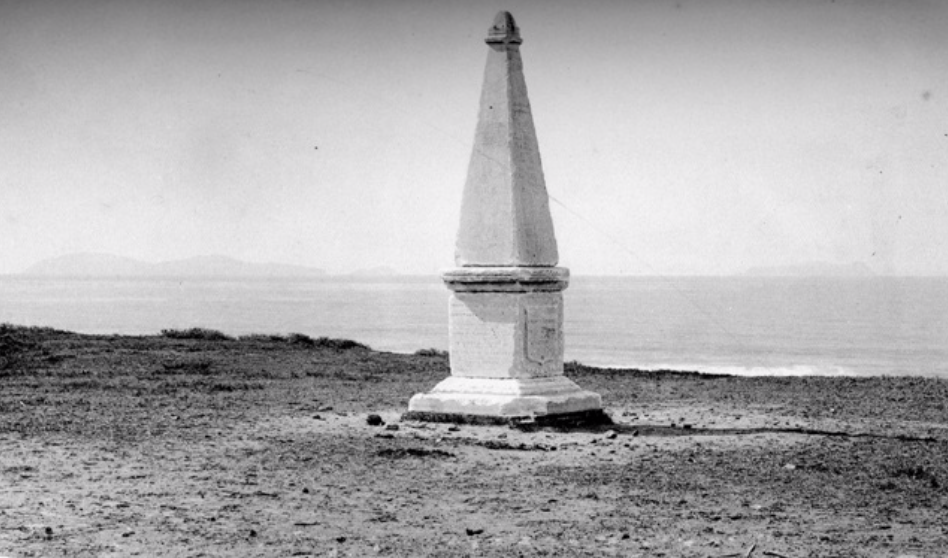
Initial monument marking the Mexico–United States border

Migration into the United States in this period was also soon complicated by racial restrictions. For the first time in its history, the U.S. barred an entire national-origin group from immigrating when it passed the Chinese Exclusion Act in 1882. This caused difficulties at the Mexico–United States border, since the Act officially excluded Mexicans of Chinese descent from entering the U.S. as well. "Chinese Inspectors" were hired by the United States Customs Service to inspect immigrants at ports of entry in the Southwest. While official U.S. policy was to deport all ethnic Chinese immigrants to China, migration policies were slightly revised for Chinese Mexicans, who were deported to Mexico instead, if they held Mexican citizenship, had lived most of their lives in Mexico, or were married to Mexican nationals. This "Chinese inspection" force would grow into the U.S. Border Patrol.

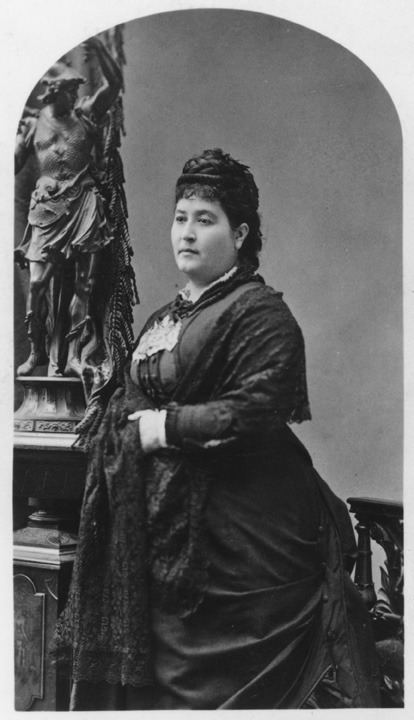
María Ruiz de Burton, a Mexican American author

These continued indignities suffered by Mexicans and Mexican Americans did not go completely ignored, however. In 1885, María Ruiz de Burton, a Californian Mexican-American, published The Squatter and the Don, a novel set in 1870s San Diego County, where the fictional Amaro family clashed with esquatas, Anglo Americans who "improved" the Amaro family ranch in order to lay legal claim to the land. Considered the United States' first female Mexican-American author, Maria Ruiz de Burton had been politicized through her personal experiences in California after the Mexican American War. Before the publication of her novel, she wrote to her cousin, "It cannot be denied that the Californians have reason to complain. The Americans must know it; their boasted liberty and equality of rights seem to stop when it meets a Californian ... And now we have to beg for what we had the right to demand."

The publication of Burton's novel coincided with several other important developments in California for Mexican Americans. The decade witnessed the official dismantling of Spanish usage in official government documents, around the same time the Gilded Age practice of voter suppression emerged to disenfranchise African American peoples from having a say in the functions of government.

For Mexican Americans, in general, the Gilded Age was a period of abrupt economic change, political disenfranchisement, and demographic displacement. While there was significant immigrant labor entering the Southwest from Mexico during this period through the railroads, it was dwarfed by the tidal wave of Anglos moving West from New York and other ports of entry. While the 1880s brought major changes, the coming years would emerge as a retrenchment of racial animosity.

=== Rise of Juan Crow ===
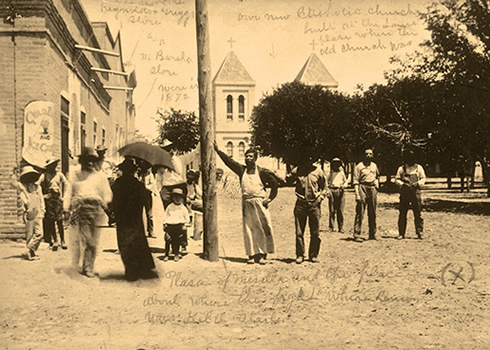
Group of Mexican Americans on the plaza in Mesilla, New Mexico, c. 1890s

The 1890s for Mexican Americans were marked by renewed social unrest, including race-related conflicts. In El Paso, which experienced a massive influx of white American migrants to the region after the completion of the Southern Pacific railway line, there was a widespread retrenchment of racial animosity. Interracial marriage, which had theretofore been tacitly allowed in some parts of Texas, became a crime increasingly targeted by Texan officials. In El Paso, Mexicans Americans were demonized as ignorant, and therefore both ineligible and unworthy of the vote. White Texans also frequently characterized them as "foreigners", despite their U.S. citizenship. One El Paso newspaper claimed Mexicans were "foreigners who claim American citizenship but who are as ignorant of things American as the mule."

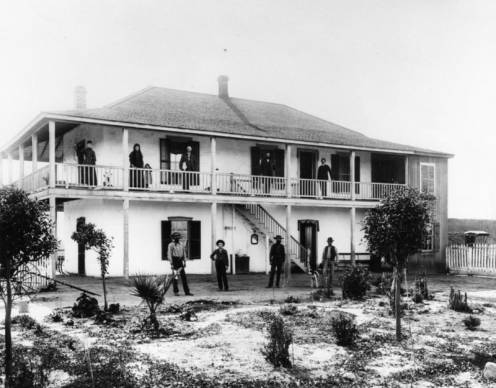
The Lugo family in Bell Gardens, California, c. 1890s

In the 1890s, the railroad and mining industries continued to expand. These industries needed massive pools of labor to fill new jobs, many of which were filled by immigrants from Mexico. Immigrants entering the United States came from remote regions of Mexico, seeking relief from the increasingly brutal Porfiriato. The Texas Mexican Railway had connected the U.S. and Mexico in 1883, and this railway allowed for an increasingly integrated transnational transportation system between the two countries. Meanwhile, for elite Mexican American families who continued to undergo litigation involving disputed land claims, the federal government finally offered them some relief in 1891. The Court of Private Land Claims was created to settle disputes, providing a federally funded interpreter for the court. The New Mexico Territory, which had been urging such a commission for years, fell under the jurisdiction of the court, along with Colorado and Arizona. And though the Court did confirm some New Mexican land grants, many were left unconfirmed.

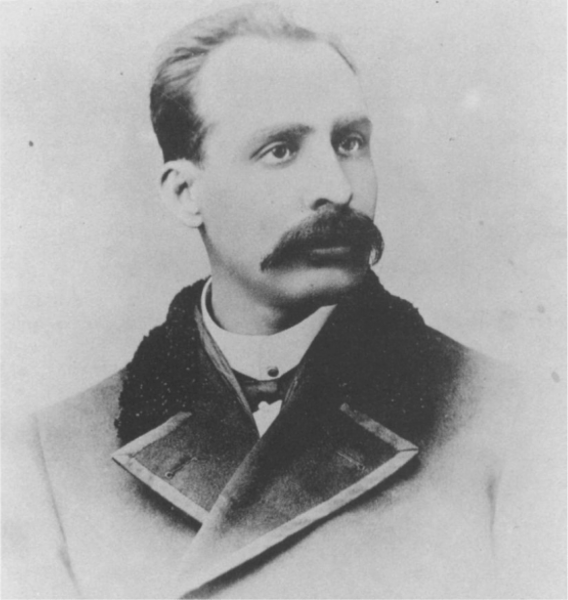
Catarino Garza, Texan revolutionary.

In Texas, the massive economic and political inequalities occurring sparked a resurgence of racial warfare. In September 1891, Catarino Erasmo Garza led an army of hundreds of Tejanos back and forth across the Rio Grande in a revolt against both Mexico and the United States, known as the Garza Revolution. Adopting the slogan "libres fronterizos" which were stitched onto their hats, the army, known as the Garzistas, was a multi-class movement, consisting of lower-middle-class professionals, poor farmers, landless ranchers, and wealthy landowners, with both Mexicans and Mexican Americans (as well as a few Anglo Americans who had married into Mexican families). The military response to the Garza Revolution was extremely bloody, and set precedent for both Texas police, as well as the U.S. Army for domestic warfare.

Leading the suppression was U.S. Army captain John Gregory Bourke, who said, "The cheapest thing to do is to shoot them down wherever [they are] found skulking about with arms in their hands, and to burn down some of the ranchos which gave them shelter."

Bourke, who had fifteen years experience in Arizona during the Apache Wars, led his armies to destroy all Tejano communities believed to support Garza. The U.S. Army burned down ranches, threatened families with lynching, searched without warrants, and stole guns, horses, and money from Tejano families. Complaints were filed with state and federal officials, but the atrocities were ignored. The Garza Revolution was suppressed by 1893, at which point Catarino Garza was forced into exile, along with the last of his scattered supporters.

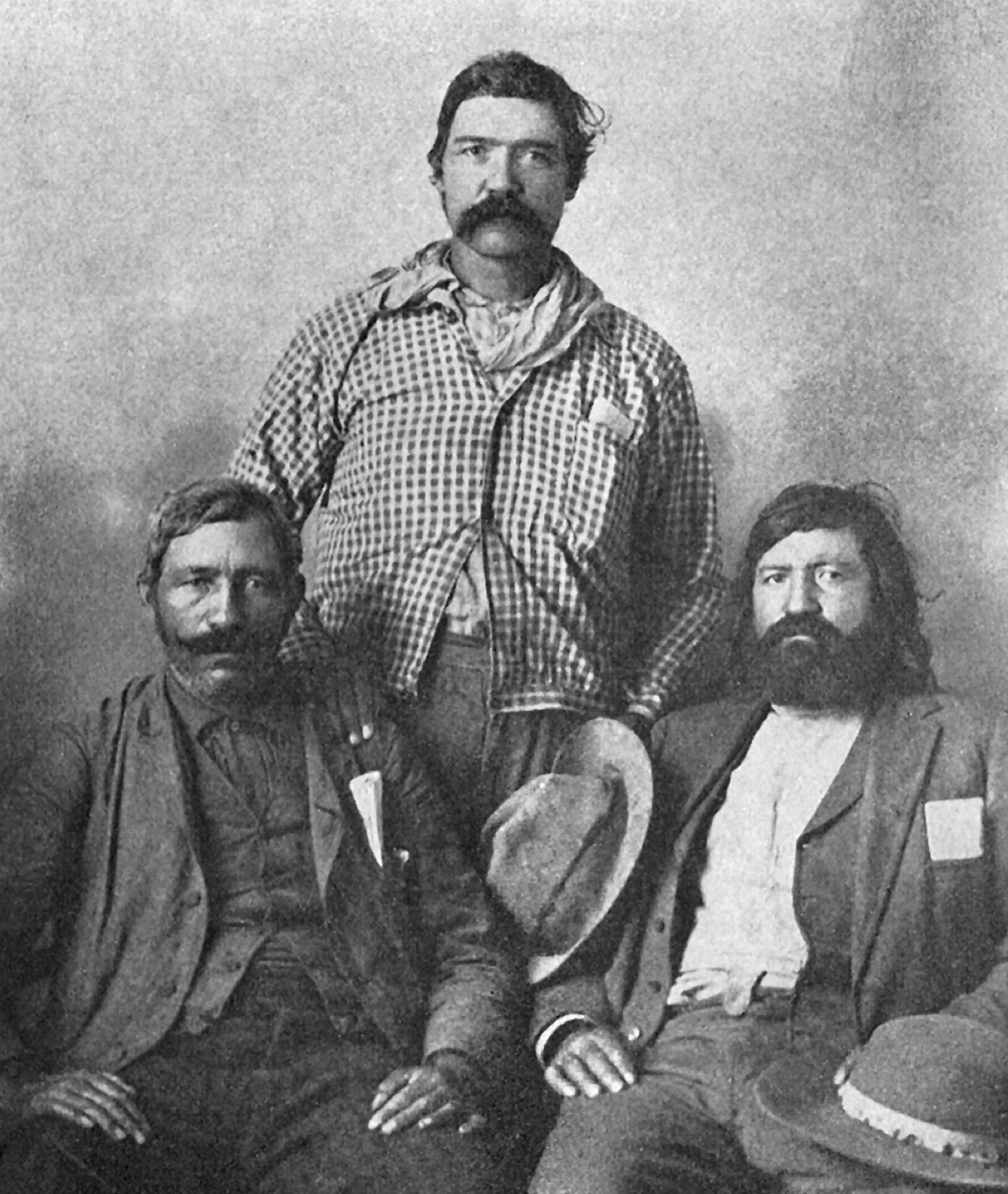
The Herrera brothers in New Mexico

In New Mexico, the Santa Fe Ring, a group of powerful Anglo lawyers and land speculators, dispossessed thousands of Mexican Americans of lands they used for community farming. The Ring fenced off the lands to prevent anyone from accessing them. A group called Las Gorras Blancas sued the Ring, arguing for community access to the Las Vegas Land Grant, but the judge sided with the Ring. The Gorras Blancas promised military retribution. In 1890, they began their campaign of vigilante justice, cutting down the new fences, destroying farm equipment, and burning buildings throughout San Miguel, Santa Fe, and Mora counties.

The Gorras Blancas held between 700 and 1,500 members at its height. They declared themselves defenders of "the rights of all people in general, [but especially] poor people". The territorial Governor Lebaron Bradford Prince declared them a violent "mob", and organized officials to clamp down on them. Four dozen Gorras Blancas were indicted, but none were convicted.

In Arizona, racial violence erupted in 1896 with the Yaqui Uprising, when a group of Yaqui, Pima, and Mexican revolutionaries fought against the U.S. and Mexican armies in an early attempt to overthrow the increasingly despotic president, Porfirio Díaz.

== 1900s ==
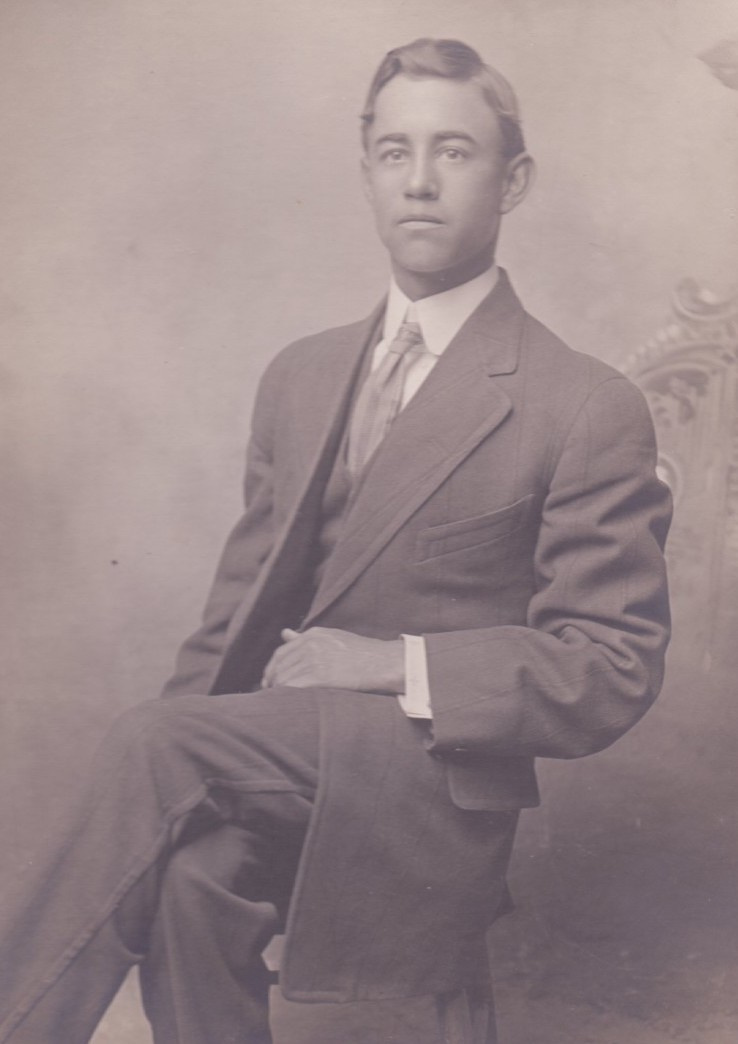
A Tejano youth, c. 1900

In the 1900s decade, the population of Mexican Americans grew significantly. The first railroad connecting Mexico City to the Mexico-U.S. border was completed, which allowed for easier Mexican movement across it. Migration increased especially after a severe recession hit Mexico in 1906, and then a depression from 1908 to 1909. The Mestizo migrants were met with animosity in the U.S., as Anglo Americans in the Southwest began warning about the dangers of non-white immigration. As the number of Mexican immigrants increased, nativist broadsides emerged, which asserted the poor living conditions of in immigrant communities were indicative of flaws within the Mexican character, rather than existing residents' failure to assist the immigrants.

=== Domestic politics ===
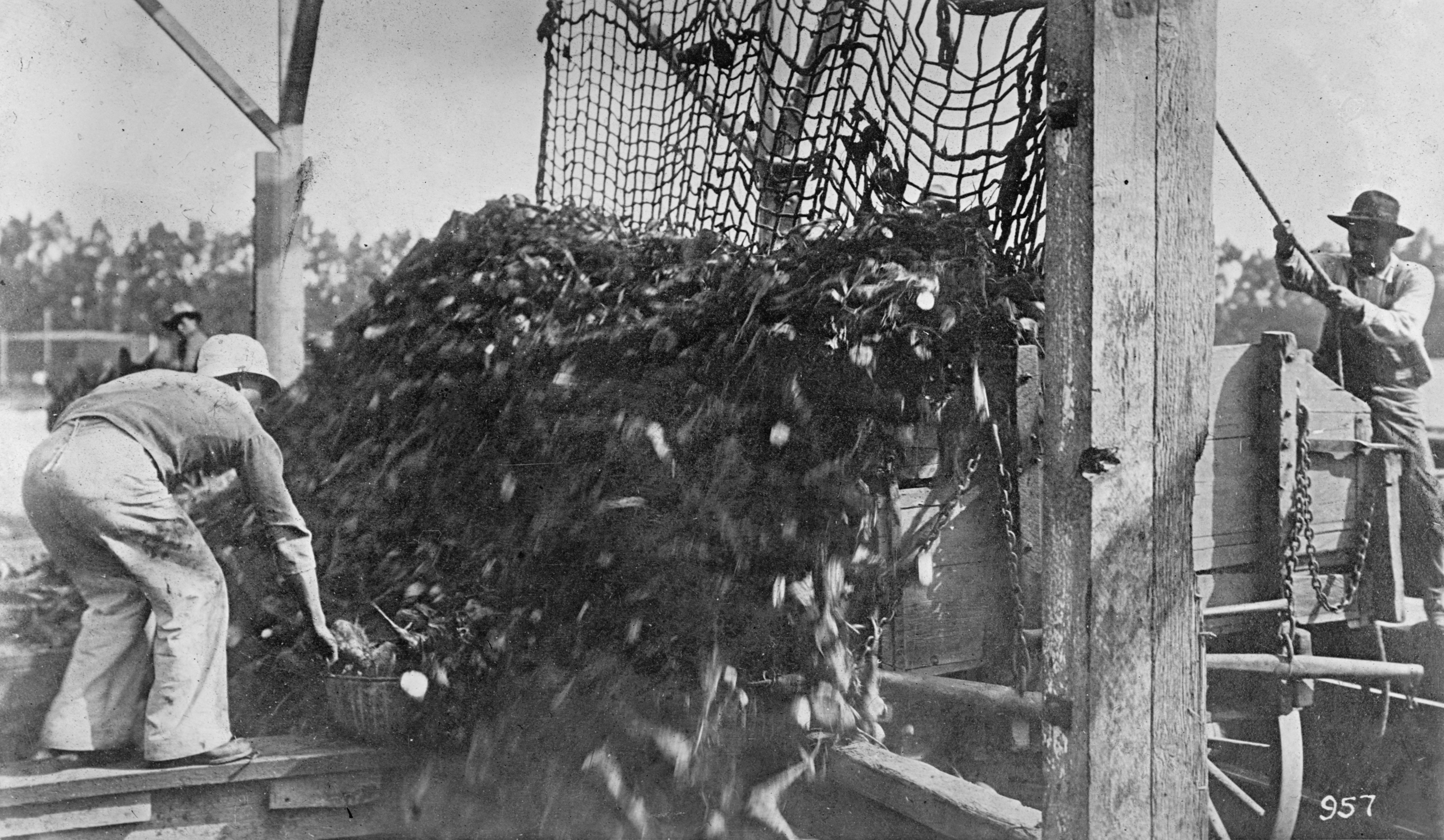
Beet farm in Oxnard, California

U.S.-born Mexican Americans faced legal discrimination, including being made to attend segregated schools where they were severely underserved and mistreated, mysterious and unexplained "jail suicides", and lynchings.

In 1903, near Oxnard, California, a group of Mexican- and Japanese-American farmworkers went on strike for better wages and working conditions. It was one of the first recorded organized strikes by Mexican-Americans in U.S. history. The strikers raised the ire of the surrounding White community. One laborer, Luis Vasquez, was shot and killed, and four others were wounded. While the strikers were able to leverage the press from the shooting into securing some of their demands, the Samuel Gompers and the American Federation of Labor refused to grant the strikers an official union charter due to their racial makeup.

In Clifton, Arizona, in 1904, mobs of White men raided Mexican American families' homes to kidnap their children, trying to save the children from supposed "suffering" caused by being raised in Mexican homes. In 1906, the Supreme Court refused to hear a case regarding punishment for the kidnappers, thereby tacitly allowing the children to be legally adopted and raised by those kidnappers.

From the 1900s to 1930s, Mexican Americans utilized the court systems to assert and defend their rights as citizens in various ways. Mexican Americans faced challenges regarding land ownership and property rights due to discriminatory practices and racial prejudice. They often turned to the courts to fight against land dispossession, unlawful evictions, and discriminatory property laws. Through legal proceedings, they sought to assert their ownership rights and protect their property interests.

Mexican Americans also engaged in legal battles to challenge racial discrimination and assert their civil rights. They filed lawsuits against discriminatory practices in public accommodations, transportation, and voting rights. These legal efforts played a role in advancing civil rights for Mexican Americans and challenging systemic racism. In "West of Sex: Making Mexican America, 1900-1930," author Pablo Mitchell provides insights into how Mexican Americans engaged with the legal system to recognize and assert their rights as citizens.

=== International relations ===
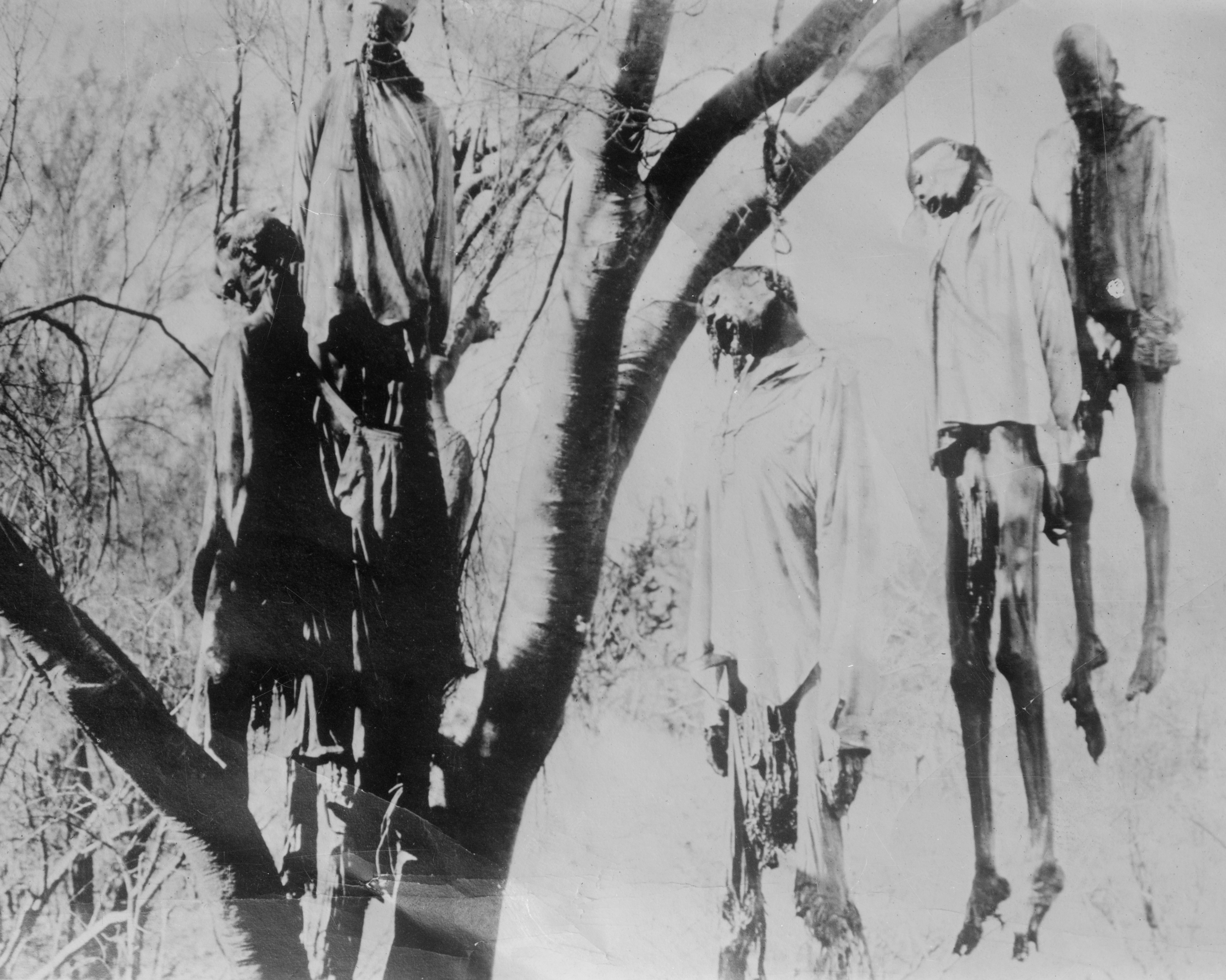
Yaqui men lynched by the Porfiriato.

In these years around the turn of the century, Mexico intensified its campaign against the Yaqui of Sonora, who were fighting against the forced assimilation programs of the Porfirio government. The federal Mexican government initiated a program of forced resettlement, deporting Yaqui rebels to work as slave laborers on the henequen plantations in Yucatán. In response, many Mexican Yaquis fled to the United States. The U.S. Army, led by Captain Harry C. Wheeler, negotiated with the Mexican government to deport any Yaqui found in Arizona back to Mexico. The U.S. Department of Commerce and Labor went a step further and ordered the detention and deportation of all Yaquis who entered the United States without documentation. Somewhere between 10,000 and 15,000 Yaquis were deported to Mexico, where they were met with murder, lynching, and enslavement by the Porfiriato.

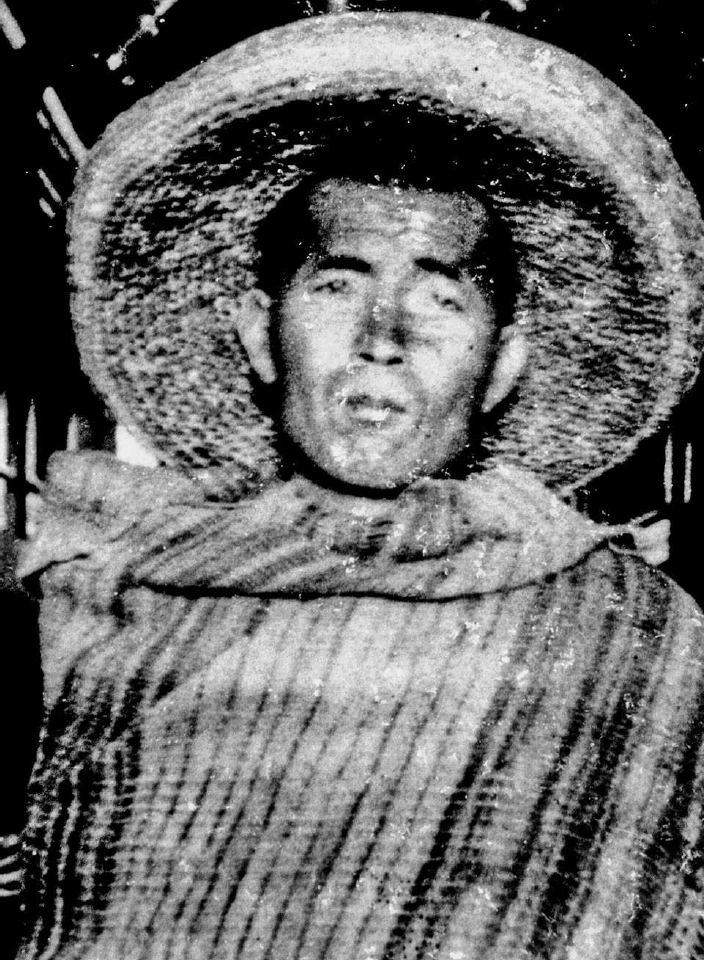
Jew Sing, from Mexico, deported from the U.S. for having Chinese ancestry

In the latter half of the decade, U.S. immigration officials worked to step up regulations at the Mexico-United States border. As immigration from Mexico to the United States increased around the turn of the century, nativists pushed to increase public health and public charge restrictions against potential migrants. Widespread anti-Chinese sentiment also created a sense of hysteria in U.S. border towns. Unable to differentiate between Indigenous and Mestizo Mexicans and Mexicans of Chinese descent, U.S. immigration officials became increasingly concerned about Chinese Mexicans who entered the United States by wearing "traditional" Mexican clothes and speaking Spanish.

In 1905, T. F. Schmucker, Chief of the Immigration Bureau in El Paso, asserted that between 150 and 200 Chinese Mexicans were being held in detention in Juarez. By 1907, U.S. immigration officials adopted even more stringent policies in order to prevent Chinese Mexicans from entering the United States; however, one immigration inspector named Marcus Braun, wrote, "How exceedingly difficult it is to positively state whether these are ... Chinamen or Mexicans." In the lead-up to the Mexican Revolution, the number of immigrants entering the U.S. from Mexico increased dramatically, including the number of Chinese Mexicans. In 1909, the El Paso Times wrote, "There are a hundred 'Celestials' where there was one twenty years before ... every train brings a dozen or two to Juarez, all intent on getting across the border, and in the course of a few years hundreds of them have been taken off trains on the American side."

== 1910s ==
=== Mexican Revolution ===
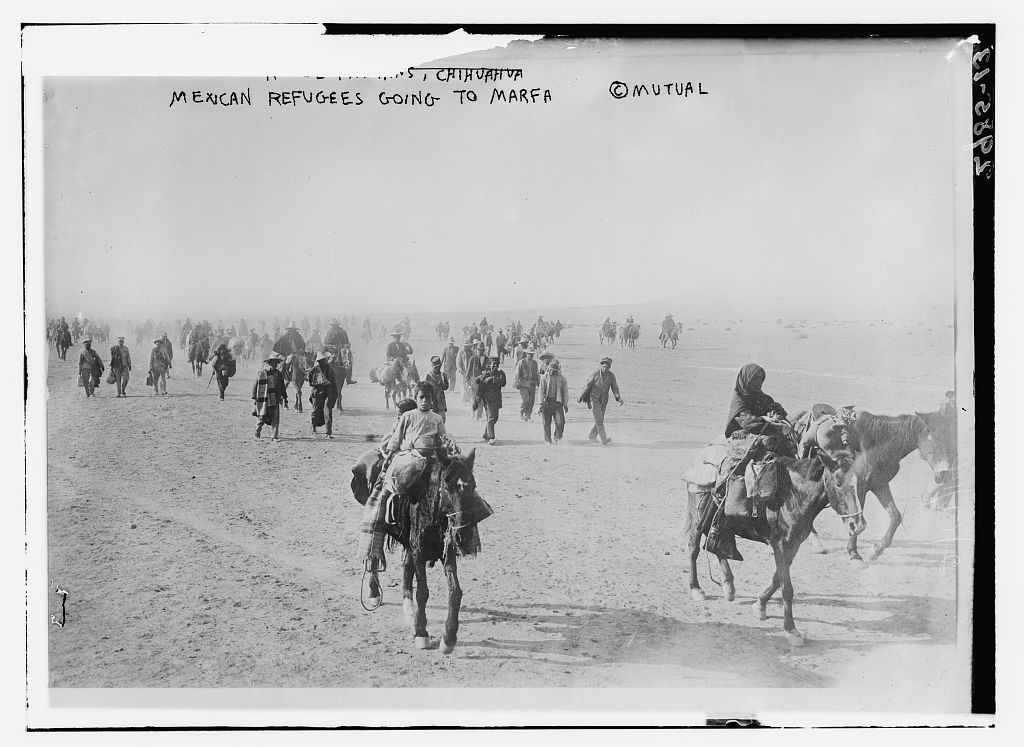
Refugees fleeing the Mexican Revolution, heading to Marfa, Texas

The Mexican Revolution (1910-1920) resulted from the increasing unpopularity of the 31-year-long brutal dictatorship of Porfirio Díaz. Growing resistance to Diaz resulted in a power struggle among competing elites, which created the opportunity for agrarian insurrection. Wealthy landowner Francisco I. Madero challenged Díaz in the 1910 presidential election, and following the rigged results, revolted under the Plan of San Luis Potosí.

Armed conflict broke out in northern Mexico, led by Madero, Pascual Orozco, and Pancho Villa, and with support from portions of the middle class, the peasantry, and organized labor, Díaz was forced out. In the Treaty of Ciudad Juárez, Díaz resigned and went into exile. New elections were held in 1911, and Madero was elected, taking office in November. Opposition to his regime then grew from both the conservatives, who saw him as too weak, and from former revolutionary fighters, who saw him as too conservative.

In a period in February 1913, known as the Ten Tragic Days, Madero and his vice president Pino Suárez were forced to resign and then assassinated. The counter-revolutionary regime of General Victoriano Huerta came to power, backed by the United States and its ambassador Henry Lane Wilson, business interests, and supporters of the old order. Huerta remained in power until July 1914, when he was forced out by a coalition of different regional revolutionary forces, including the forces of Pancho Villa and Emiliano Zapata. Wealthy landowner Venustiano Carranza formed the "Constitutionalist" political faction, and with military forces under the leadership of Álvaro Obregón, played an important part in defeating Huerta. When the revolutionaries' attempt to reach political agreement failed, Mexico plunged into a civil war (1914–15). Carranza emerged as the victor in 1915, defeating the Villistas and forcing Zapata back to guerrilla warfare. Zapata was assassinated in 1919 by agents of President Carranza. Many scholars consider the promulgation of the Mexican Constitution of 1917 as the end point of the armed conflict.

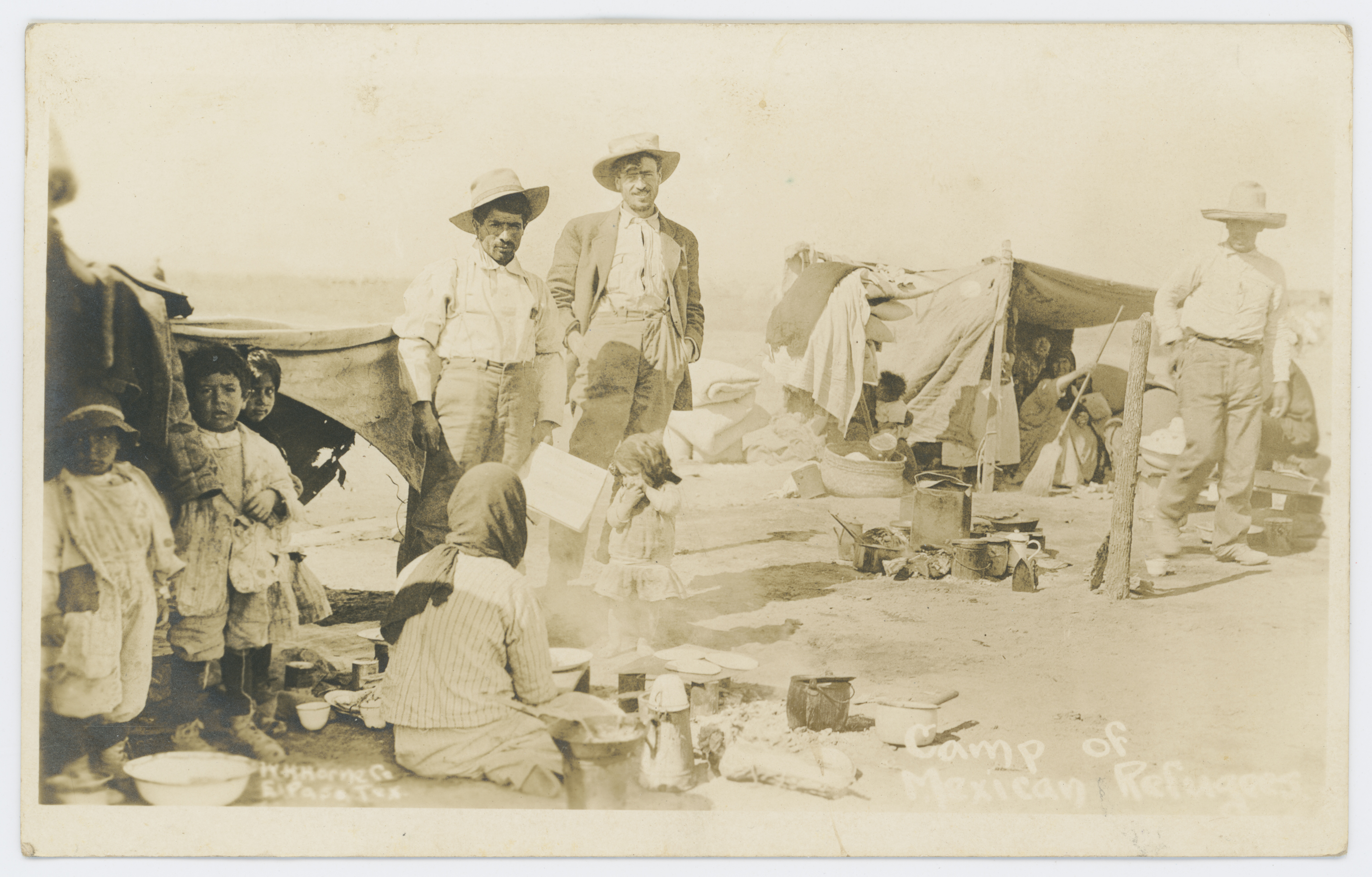
Camp for refugees of the Mexican Revolution

For the United States, the Revolution proved profoundly consequential, as the violence unleashed by the conflict led between 600,000 and 1,000,000 refugees to flee into the United States. Along the border, residents in American cities feared revolutionary fervor for land redistribution would inspire the poor and working classes in the U.S. to rise up against Anglo property ownership and domination. The Texas governor made a formal request for U.S. troops to guard the border and keep the revolutionary ideals out of the United States.

The border was effectively turned into a militarized zone. Barbed wire, spotlights, tanks, machine guns, and airplanes were brought in to surveil Mexican residents and maintain "order" in the borderlands. Around sixty-five hundred U.S. troops were stationed in El Paso, where they were ordered to keep Villistas from entering the city and keep watch over the Mexican refugees and Mexican Americans in the city. U.S. consular agent George Carothers wrote, "A large portion [of the] Mexican population of El Paso have arms ... which will create [a] dangerous situation here ... The possibility exists of them starting something serious." In January 1916, white Americans took matters into their hands and started a "race riot" in the majority-Mexican neighborhood of Chihuahuita, attacking every Mexican refugee and Mexican American they found in the streets.

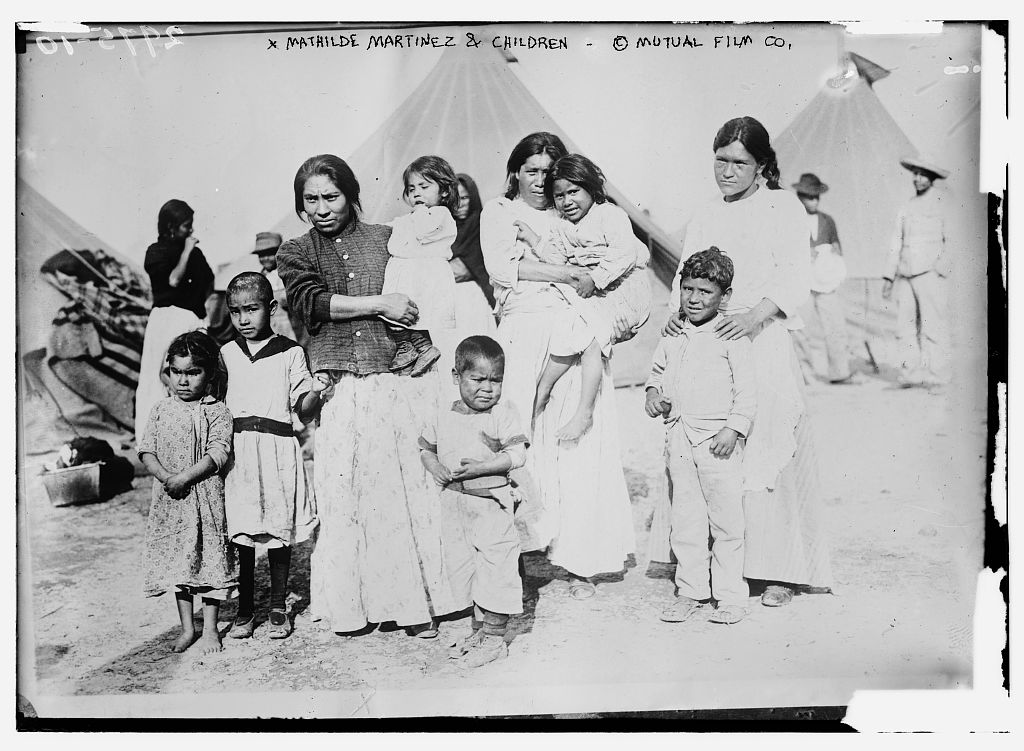
Refugees of the Mexican Revolution standing among tents, possibly in Marfa, Texas, ca. 1910

While Mexican American historians have continued to debate the long-term consequences of the Mexican Revolution, one of its most long-lasting legacies was the mass dislocation of entire communities from Mexico to the United States. Men, women, and children fled on foot, traveled by wagon and horseback, and by railroad to enter the United States as refugees. In the aftermath of Pancho Villa Expedition, one press report described the "hundreds" of refugees fleeing to the United States in the course of a single day: "Following the troops were hundreds of refugees. Prosperous Mormon families rode in comfortable farm wagons or in small motor cars. Some Mexicans rode in carriages, on horses, mules, burros and on the motor lorries of the expeditionary forces while hundreds of them and Chinese residents from the evacuated region walked through the deep dust which had been made by the feet of hundreds of troops."

=== Treatment in the U.S. ===
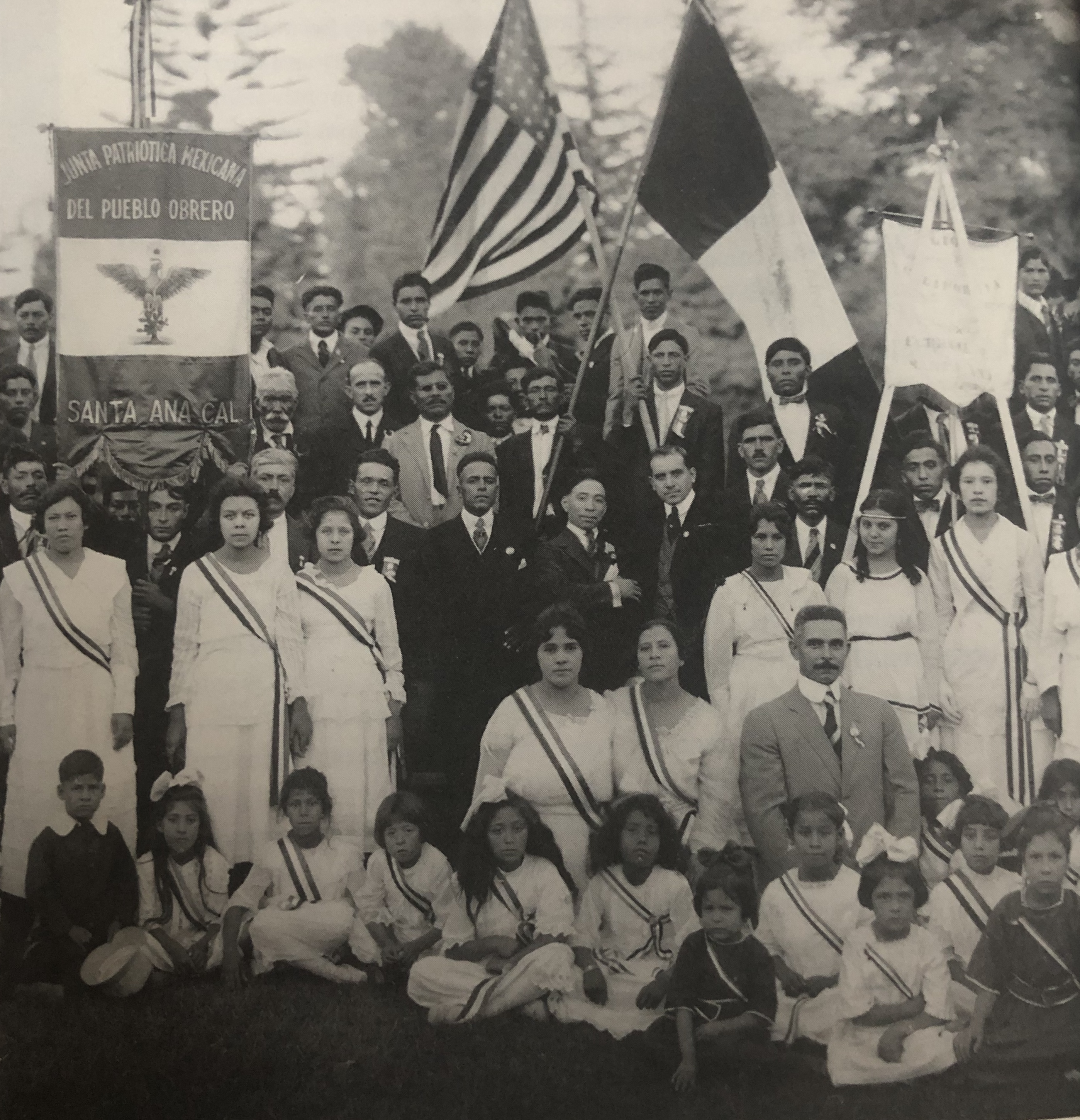
A Junta Patriótica club

Life in the United States was difficult and violent for Mexican refugees and Mexican Americans in the latter half of the Progressive Era. Reformers in the era believed that non-white people were "primitive" and biologically inferior. The eugenics-influenced Dillingham Commission argued for drastic reductions in the number of immigrants to the United States, while academics such as Charles Davenport claimed racial "deficiencies" were the root of violence and poverty. This elite nativism had a direct translation on the ground, as refugees of the Mexican Revolution were regularly denied humanitarian aid. In one incident in 1914, refugees fleeing the violence of the revolution crossed into West Texas; in response, white Texans arrested the refugees and imprisoned them in Ft. Bliss.

Most of the hundreds of thousands of Mexican refugees who fled to the United States during the Revolution settled in California and the U.S. Southwest. In Los Angeles, many of the resettled refugees lived in the historically Mexican American area of East Los Angeles. State and local resources were thinly spread, and Mexican refugees and Mexican Americans were specifically targeted for exclusion from welfare programs. Mexicans were left to fill pre-existing gaps in the American labor market, and colonias, or Mexican-majority neighborhoods, were established in Chicago, Kansas City, and Salt Lake City, as railroad companies were one of the main sources of employment.

The steel and automobile sectors drew Mexicans and Mexican Americans to Detroit, San Francisco, and Minneapolis, as well as farming in Oregon, Texas, and Southern California. In order to provide middle-class Mexicans with a sense of grounding in their new communities, consulates of the Mexican government in major cities organized a network of juntas patrioticas (patriotic councils) and comisiónes honoríficos (honorary committees) to celebrate Mexican national holidays and to express support for the Revolution. The juntas patrioticas proved incredibly popular, and were an early form of community organizing for the Mexican community in the United States.

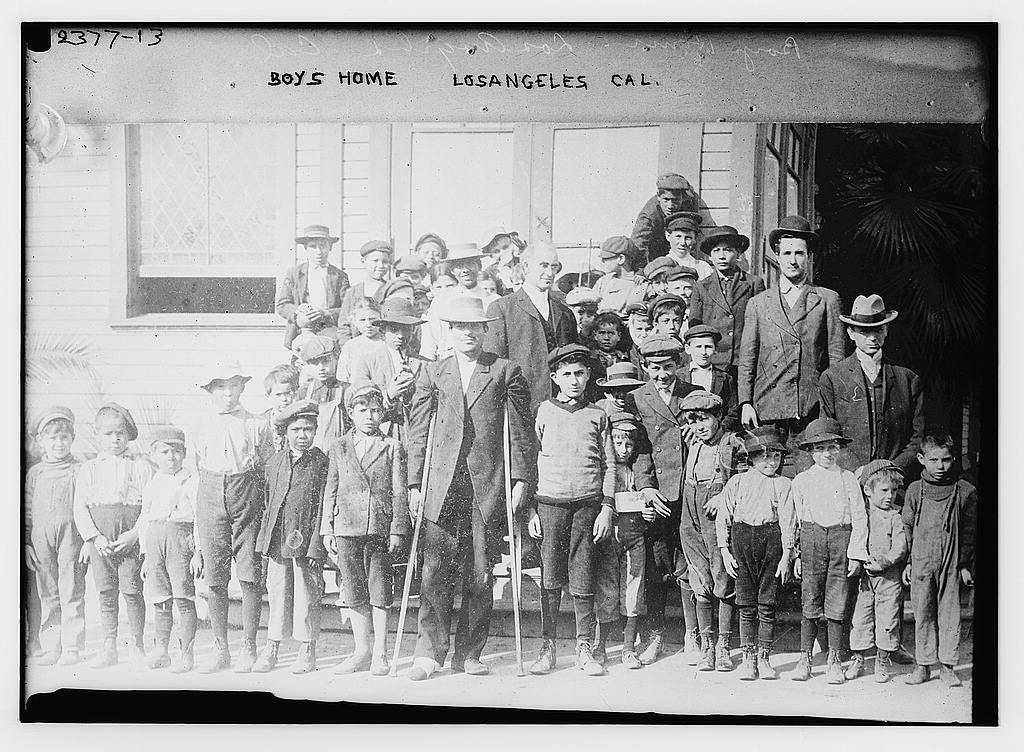
A Los Angeles Boys' home. These homes for orphaned and delinquent boys often targeted young Mexican and African American boys for sterilization.

Mexican Americans also faced a darker form of discrimination during the Progressive Era. In this period, several dozen states passed eugenics laws, outlining legal criteria for compulsory sterilization. In California, eugenicists at public institutions like Sonoma State Hospital and Whittier State School began their sterilization programs in the 1910s. These doctors believed that "dispositions" for poverty, crime, mental illness, disability, and violence were inheritable, and thus, anyone diagnosed as "insane", "feebleminded", or "epileptic" was unfit for "breeding". They would thus be permanently sterilized in order to solve the nation's social ills. Recommendations for surgical sterilization were heavily influenced by eugenic prejudices regarding the biological inadequacy of poor and non-white people.

As a result, Mexican American men, women, and children were disproportionately sterilized in California. Many Mexicans immigrating to the United States struggled through their journey crossing borders because they hoped to find stability and better opportunities in this new environment. Although, this history portrays the beginning of Mexican immigration and how new events have continued to reoccur, whether being influenced by government issues or not. By some estimates, Mexican Americans were between 40 and 60% more likely to be permanently sterilized than their white counterparts. Progressive-era elites also passed severe Anti-miscegenation laws, as well as laws prohibiting "normal" individuals from marrying people with low-IQs, in order to "breed" a more healthy nation. California's eugenic laws were the basis for Nazi eugenics.

=== La Matanza de Texas ===
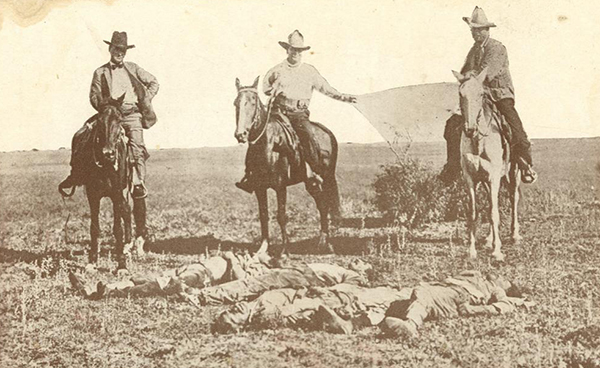
Three Texas Rangers posing with the corpses of Mexican American men

The mid-1910s proved to be one of the most violent periods for Mexican Americans in Texan history. In the summer of 1915, a manifesto attributed to Mexican seditionists was discovered, entitled El Plan de San Diego. The plan sought to overthrow American control over the entire borderlands through a panethnic "Liberating Army of race and people", which would include Mexicans and Mexican Americans, African Americans, and Japanese Americans.

The plan called for the expulsion of Anglos and the execution of all white American men over the age of sixteen years old. The plan also called for burning bridges and derailing trains in order to disrupt federal, state, and local infrastructure. The initial steps of the plan were initiated through targeted attacks against prominent ranches. On August 8, 1915, around sixty ethnic men raided the Los Norias headquarters of the Texas Rangers on the King Ranch. The response to this raid and the discovery of the plan was swift and violent. The Texas Rangers launched an indiscriminate manhunt, killing every Mexican and Mexican American man they could find. One Ranger wrote that the troops showed a "savage radical element" against the Mexicans. Estimates range that at least 102 people were killed in the wake of this first incident.

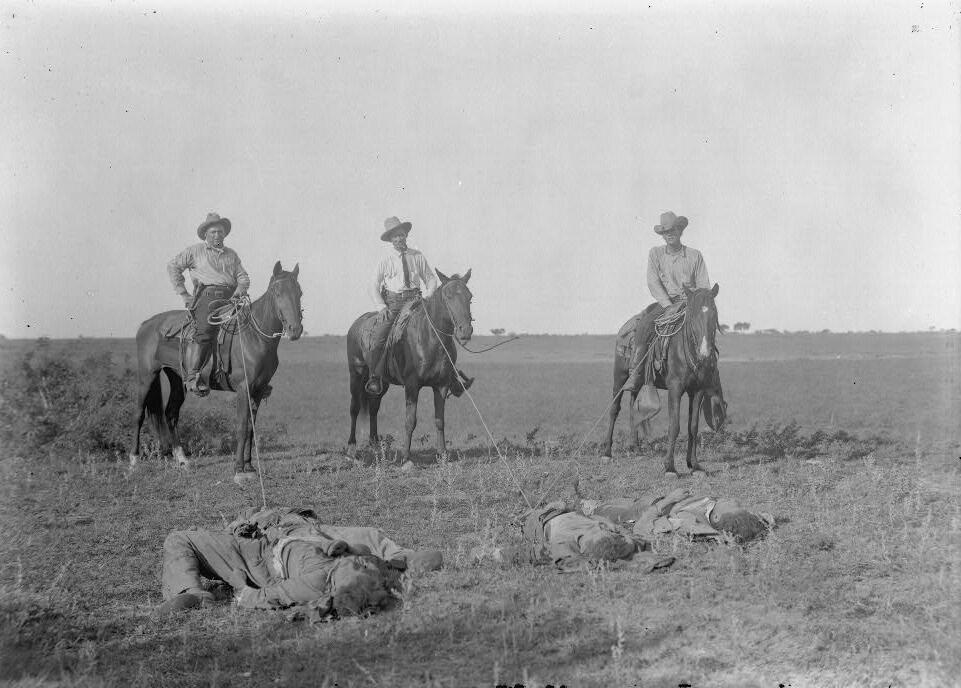
Texas Rangers smiling alongside the corpses of dead Mexican Americans

This event set off a wave of violence across South Texas, described by some as an "orgy of bloodshed" known as La Hora de Sangre (part of a broader period called La Matanza). Texas judge James Wells estimated that in Hidalgo County and Cameron County alone, Texas officers and vigilantes executed between 250 and 300 men between the summers of 1915 and 1916. Extralegal violence was enacted by white mobs, state police, and local deputies across Texas, and estimates of the dead range from 300 to several thousand. Police often colluded with the vigilante mobs, and Mexican Americans were tortured, hanged, shot, beat, and burned alive.

Many of the known victims were adult men, though a few women, and some children, were murdered by the white mobs. The executions often occurred in isolated and rural areas hidden from public view. Assailants almost never faced arrest, and grand juries refused to indict the accused, as in the case of Porvenir massacre. Mexican Americans had no option but to organize their lives to avoid law enforcement or the white American community.

=== Immigration policies ===
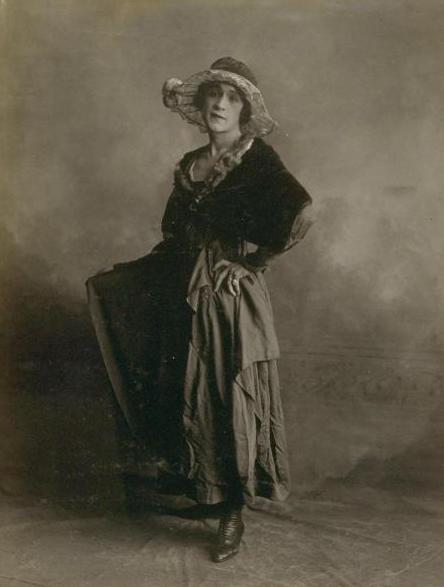
Geraldine Portica, a transgender Mexican woman deported from the United States to Mexico in 1917

The nativism which had been growing in the United States for several decades grew even stronger in the aftermath of the Mexican Revolution. In January 1917, the United States passed the Immigration Act of 1917. This legislation severely curtailed immigration to the United States and marked a major turning point in U.S. immigration policy. The act introduced a literacy requirement, increased the "head tax" to eight dollars (a significant sum at the time), added new prohibited categories (including peoples with mental illness, as well as the "gender inverse", meaning all members of the LGBT community), and extended the Chinese Exclusion Act to bar all Asian immigrants (except from Japan and the Philippines). This act created a burden for Mexican immigrants, as the literacy requirements, head taxes, and restricted categories were applied vigorously.

In 1917, the U.S. Public Health Service also implemented invasive medical inspections at the border (where men and boys would be stripped naked and examined for "defective" anatomy – including large breasts or small genitalia – and sprayed with chemical agents to be "disinfected"). Outrage at these procedures resulted in the 1917 Bath riots. Soon, agricultural interests in California and Texas, successfully lobbied Secretary of Labor William B. Wilson to create exemptions for agricultural laborers. For all other immigrants from Mexico, the protocols remained in place.

With these new policies in place, nativists across the United States were emboldened to enact anti-Mexican violence. In one particularly infamous and egregious incident in Bisbee, Arizona, over 1,000 Mexican and Mexican American laborers were forcibly deported by an army of over 2,000 deputies in an incident known as the Bisbee Deportation. The laborers, who were miners in the nearby copper mine, had been organized by the Industrial Workers of the World, a labor union, on June 26, 1917. In response, Sheriff Harry Wheeler and his army of deputies rounded up and arrested over a thousand of the men on July 12, 1917, marching them to a waiting train. The train carried the men to Columbus, New Mexico, where it left them in the desert without food or water.

=== World War I ===
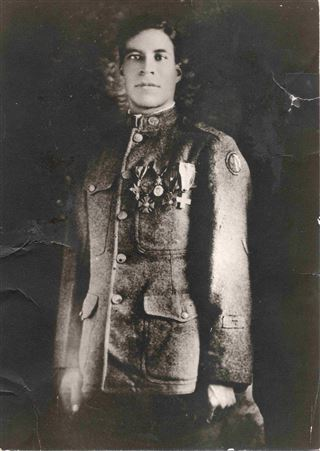
Marcelino Serna, an immigrant from Mexico, was one of World War I's most highly decorated men.

U.S. involvement in World War I lasted from April 6, 1917 until the war's end on November 11, 1918. During this time, approximately 200,000 Latino Americans fought for the United States. The majority of these Latino servicemen were Mexican Americans. Many of these men experienced discrimination in the service, and some went so far as to hide their Mexican ancestry to avoid prejudicial treatment. Unlike African American servicemen, however, Mexican Americans did not serve in segregated units during World War I. Even as white American servicemen harassed the Mexican American soldiers for their "barrio English", Mexican American soldiers proved decisive in several key skirmishes, including the Battle of Saint-Mihiel and the Meuse–Argonne offensive.

David B. Barkley, one Mexican American man from Laredo, was posthumously awarded the Medal of Honor for scouting behind enemy lines in France. And Marcelino Serna, who immigrated to the United States from Mexico as a young man, was awarded the Distinguished Service Cross. During the war, Serna singlehandedly destroyed a German machine gun site in one battle. Two weeks later, he took out 26 enemy soldiers, captured 26 more as prisoners, and successfully prevented his fellow American soldiers from executing the captured men. Serna returned to the United States as the most decorated soldier from the state of Texas.

== 1920s ==
=== Rise of the KKK ===
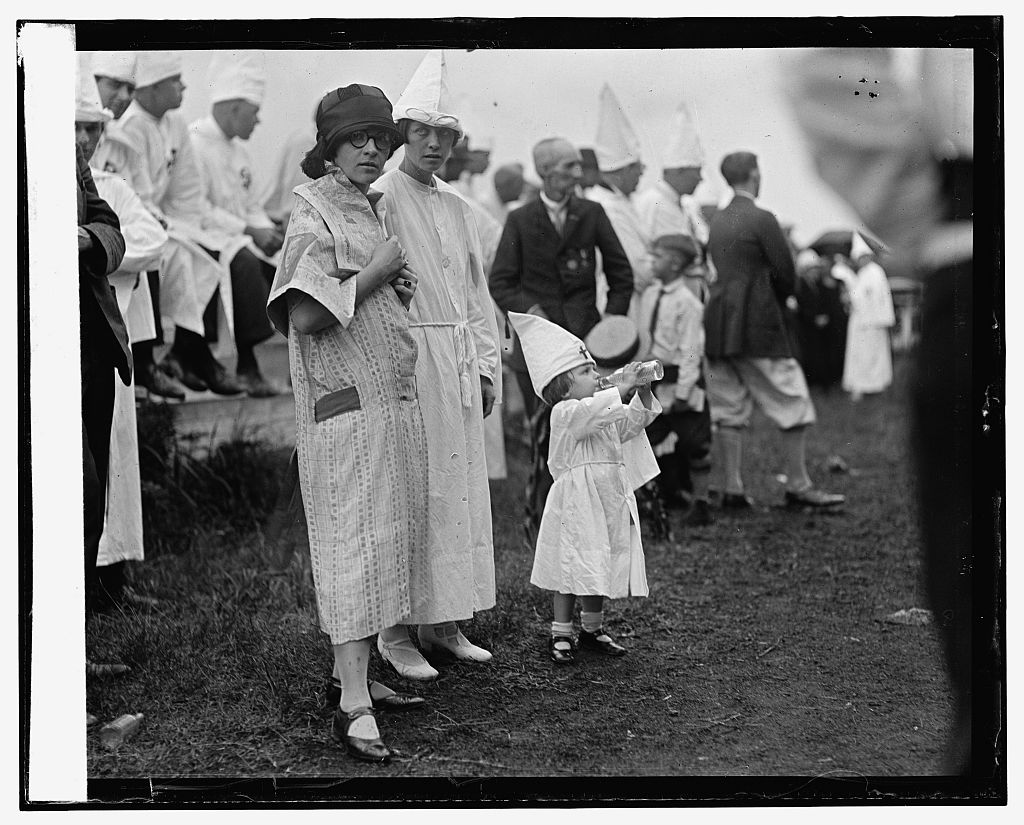
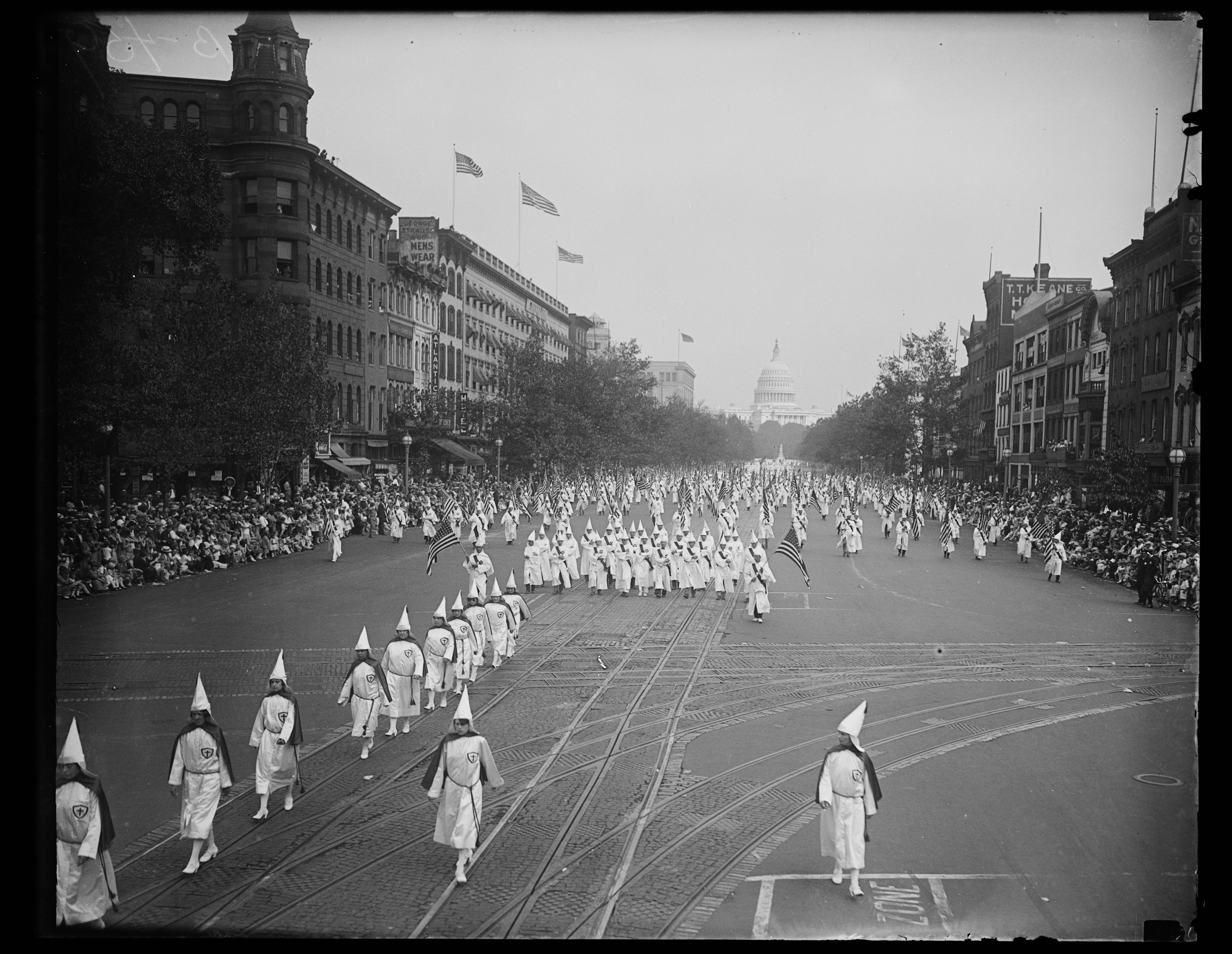
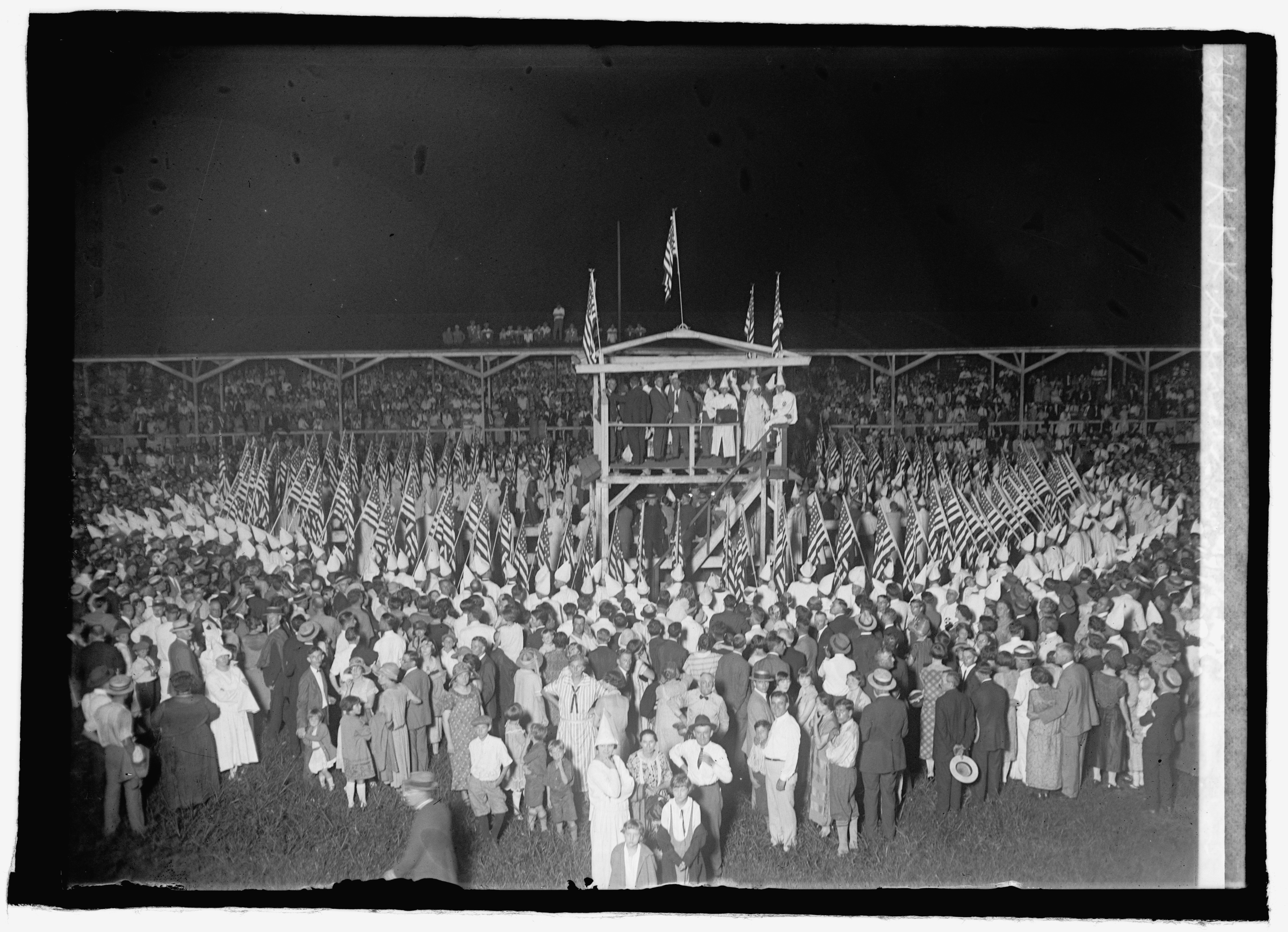
The Ku Klux Klan reached several million members and attained mainstream status in white America in the 1920s. This terrorist organization believed Mexican Americans represented a "threat" to the "purity" of the United States.

In the years after World War I, the rising tide of nativism continued to grow in the 1920s. The Second Ku Klux Klan was a new organization patterned after the original KKK of the 1860s. It was anti-Catholic and anti-immigrant and taught that all Mexicans and Mexican Americans were "subhuman foreigners". The KKK mounted an extensive campaign of violence across the Southwest.

The KKK had a strong presence in Texas and California. The organization had adherents in rural communities in both states, and held major political control in large cities. In Dallas, where the KKK gained control over the city's politics, it sought to completely close off the border with Mexico. In San Diego, the KKK was led by many of the city's elite. According to Ernesto Galarza, a labor activist and professor, "Mexicans were seen as an endangerment to traditional American values. [Even the clergy] often ignored the Klan's abuses toward Latinos".

The KKK in Southern California regularly lynched, tortured, dragged, and murdered Mexicans and Mexican Americans. Mercedes Acasan Garcia, a refugee of the Revolution working as a maid in San Diego in the 1920s, stated, "Since they were ragged Wetbacks, nobody cared who they were and nothing was done about it." The KKK was also extremely politically powerful in Los Angeles, and in 1928, the KKK senior member John Clinton Porter was elected mayor of the city.

Colorado was another area with extensive Klan activity. During World War I, Colorado companies sought to fill labor gaps left by soldiers through recruiting refugees of the Mexican Revolution (who had arrived in the United States in large numbers during the 1910s). As labor recruiters paid to relocate large numbers of refugees to Colorado, white residents became increasingly enraged at the presence of the "radical aliens". During the First Red Scare of 1920, significant numbers of white Coloradans joined nativist and "one hundred percent American" organizations. Despite these sentiments, corporations continued to recruit Mexicans. In 1921, John Galen Locke harnessed the intensifying anti-Mexican feelings and organized the KKK in Colorado. By 1925, the KKK had emerged as the dominant political force in Colorado, running on campaigns of law and order and anti-Mexicanism. The KKK deliberately held rallies in cities with large Mexican neighborhoods.

=== Johnson–Reed Act ===
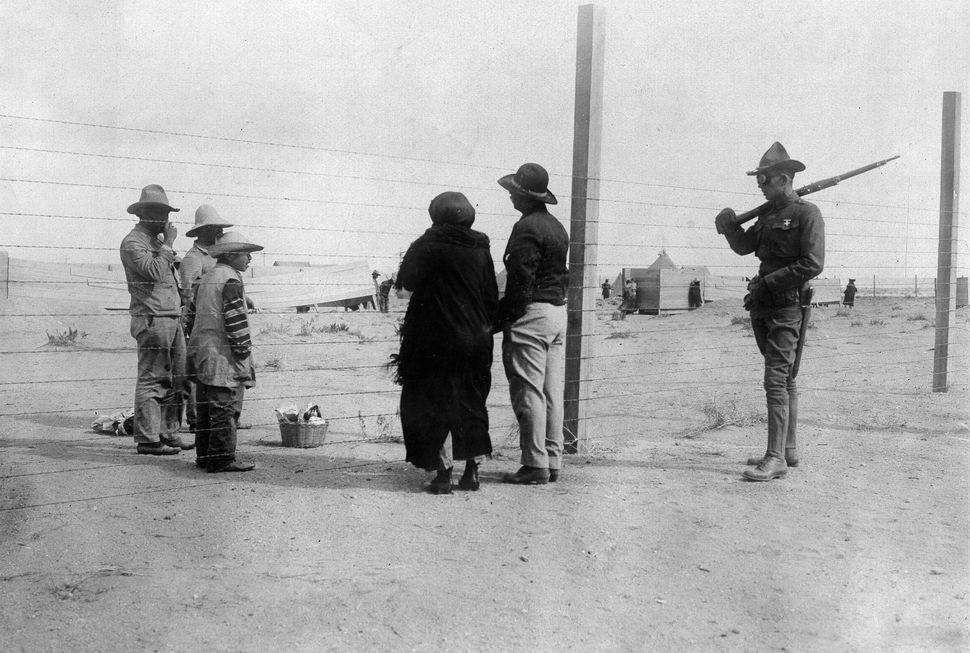
U.S. border guard and Mexicans behind the border fence, c. 1920s

In the years following World War I, the United States nearly entirely shut out immigration from the rest of the world. In 1921, Congress passed the "Emergency" Quota Act of 1921, which set immigration levels to "3 percent of the number of foreign-born persons of each nationality" living in the U.S. as determined by the 1910 United States census. This Act was meant to reserve most immigration quota slots to northwestern European countries, which received the largest number of the 350,000 total slots created.

Immigration restrictionists, however, were not satisfied, and U.S. Representative Albert Johnson and Senator David Reed responded by pushing for even stricter quotas. The resulting Johnson-Reed Act reduced the quota from 3 percent to 2 percent, and changed the census base from 1910 to 1890, which meant that only people from West and North Europe could migrate.

For Mexicans, however, the effect of the law was complicated, as the quota system applied only to countries outside the Western Hemisphere, meaning there were no caps on immigration from any Latin American country. This lack of a quota for Mexicans was controversial amongst the U.S. nativist movement, who were outraged at the large numbers of Mexican immigrants entering the country – including thousands during the Cristero War (1926-1929). Immigration restrictionists, who desired to limit the number of non-white people in the U.S., felt that immigration from Mexico, even when only to fill labor gaps, was dangerous to the nation. One article in The Saturday Evening Post asked, "How much longer [are] we going to defer putting the Mexican Indian under the quota law we have established for Europe?"

The East Texas congressman John C. Box went so far as to state that Mexicans would lead to the "mongrelization" of white America. In general, however, Mexican racial identity was contentious enough for lawmakers to avoid moving forward with increased restrictions. U.S. Secretary of Labor James Davis, wrote, "The Mexican people are of such a mixed stock and individuals have such a limited knowledge of their racial composition that it would be impossible for the most learned and experienced ethnologist or anthropologist to classify or determine their racial origin. Thus, making an effort to exclude them from admission or citizenship because of their racial status is practically impossible." According to scholars of the period, however, most Americans at the time believed Mexicans' racial heritage was "impure".

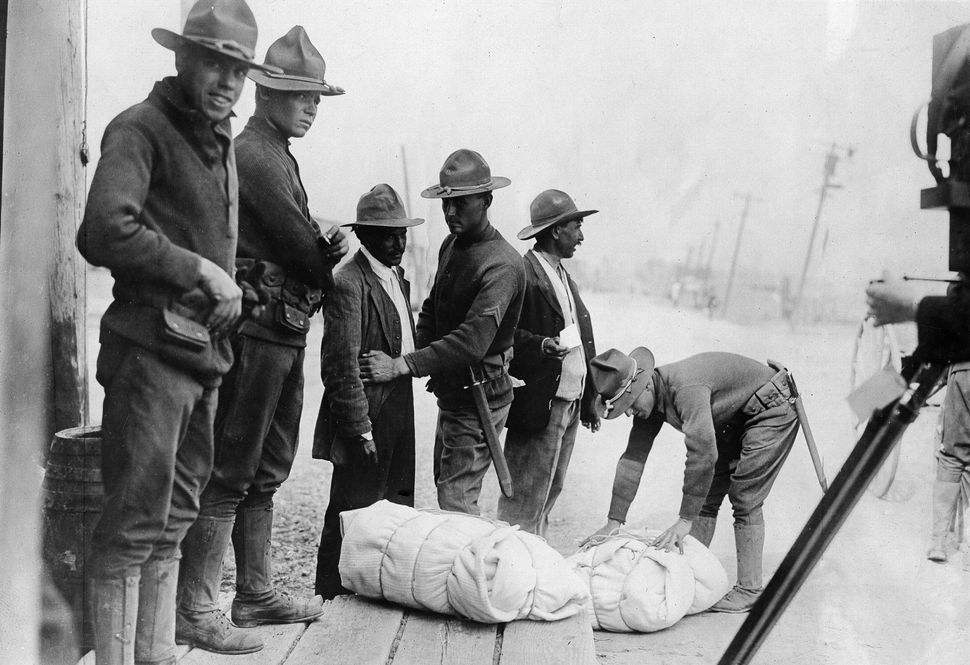
U.S. border guards check entering Mexicans, c. 1920

Even though Mexican immigration was never subjected to quota limits, U.S. immigration officials used increasingly stringent measures to limit entry. For itinerant laborers who lived in Mexico and worked in the United States, weekly disinfection mandates were regularized, and quarantine and "bath certificates" were required to be renewed weekly. Then, in 1924, the U.S. Congress approved the creation of the Border Patrol, led by the previous chief "Chinese Inspector", Clifford Alan Perkins.

The Border Patrol began with headquarters in El Paso overseeing three district offices in Los Angeles, El Paso, and San Antonio. Beginning in the 1920s, visa controls and deportations became regular mechanisms to regulate Mexican immigration. Finally in 1929, Congress passed the Aliens Act of 1929, known as Blease's Law, which turned undocumented entry into the U.S. a misdemeanor and re-entry a felony. Up to that point, immigration violations were largely considered civil matters.

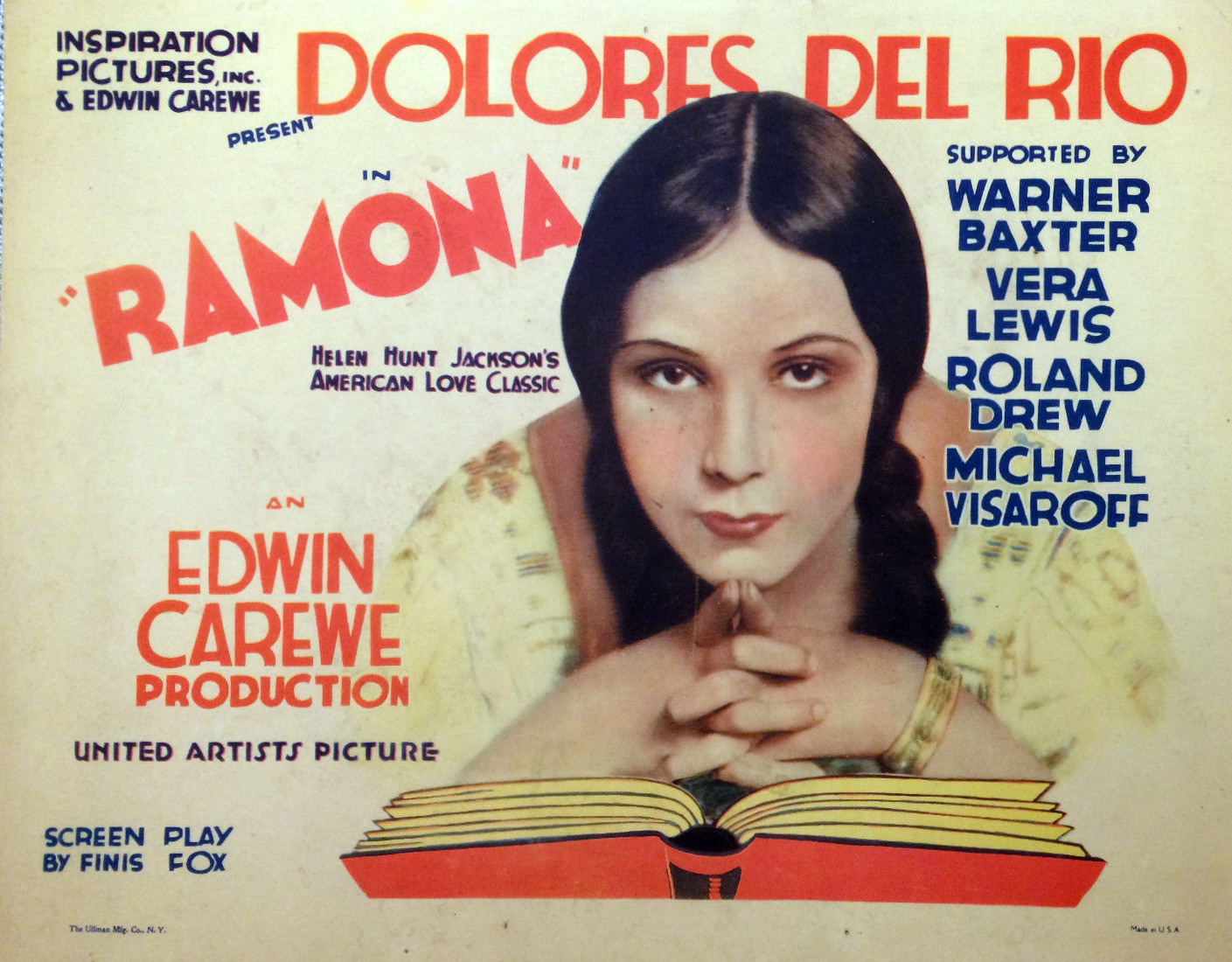
Lobby card for the U.S. drama film Ramona (1928)

=== Mexicans in Hollywood ===
In the 1920s, Mexican entertainers became significant in American popular culture. Dolores del Río, an actress, singer, and dancer, was born and raised in Mexico. She began her film career in Hollywood almost immediately upon her arrival. She had roles on a string of successful silent films, including Resurrection (1927), Ramona (1928) and Evangeline (1929). She was usually cast in non-Hispanic white roles as the romantic interest of non-Hispanic white actors. She is widely regarded as the first major Latina Hollywood star.

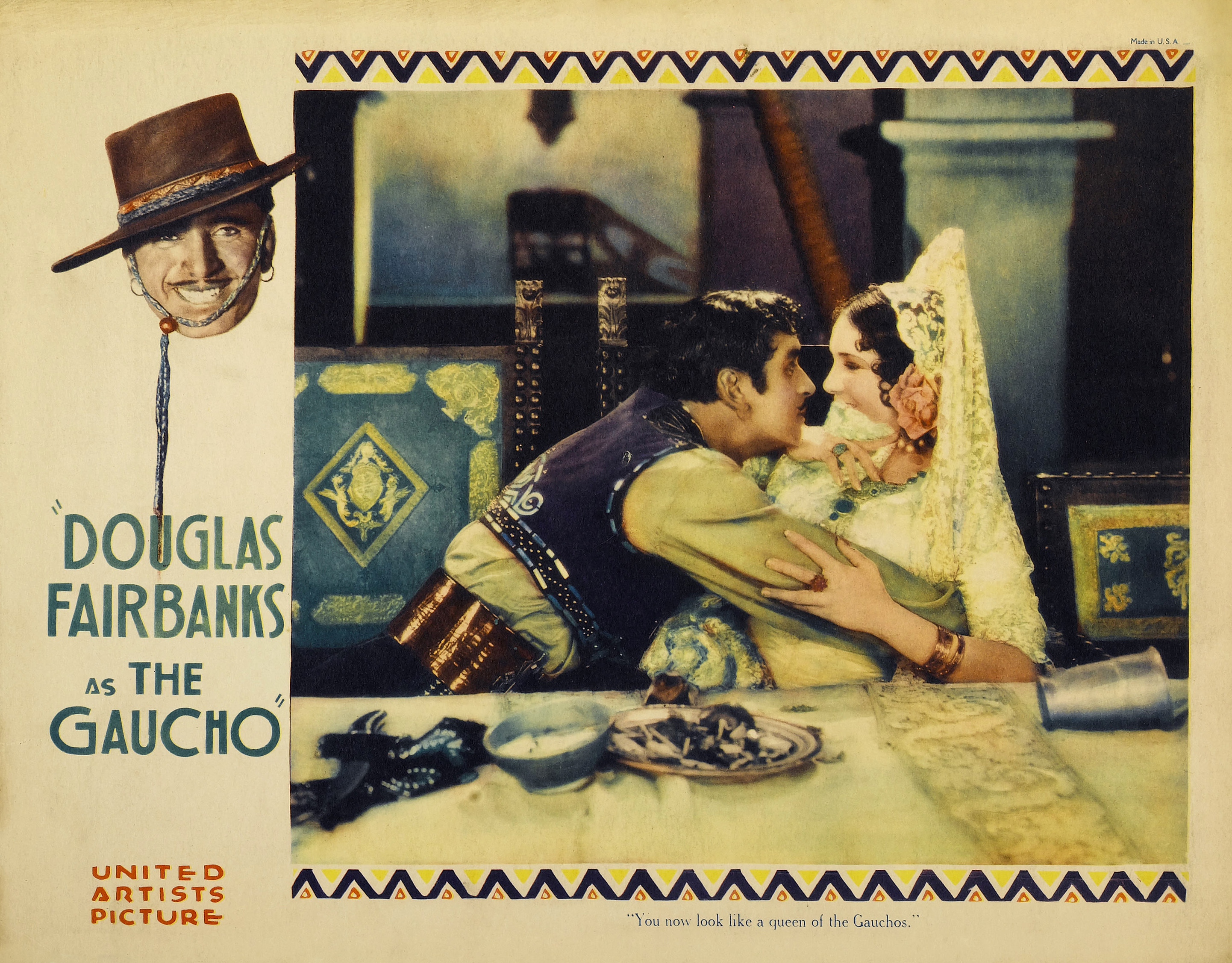
Doug Fairbanks and Lupe Vélez in The Gaucho (1927)

In the 1920s, another Mexican actress reached the heights of Hollywood stardom. Lupe Vélez attended high school in San Antonio, Texas as a teenager but returned to Mexico after her family lost their home during the Mexican Revolution. The family struggled financially in those years, and Vélez moved to Mexico City to work in an FAL department store – then considered an upper-class symbol of modern global capitalism. Her breakthrough occurred when she appeared in a popular musical production in the city's revista theater. After moving to the U.S., she made her first film appearance in a short in 1927. By the end of the decade, she was acting in full-length silent films and had progressed to leading roles in The Gaucho (1927), Lady of the Pavements (1928) and Wolf Song (1929). Vélez' roles were varied, though she often portrayed "exotic" and "foreign" women.

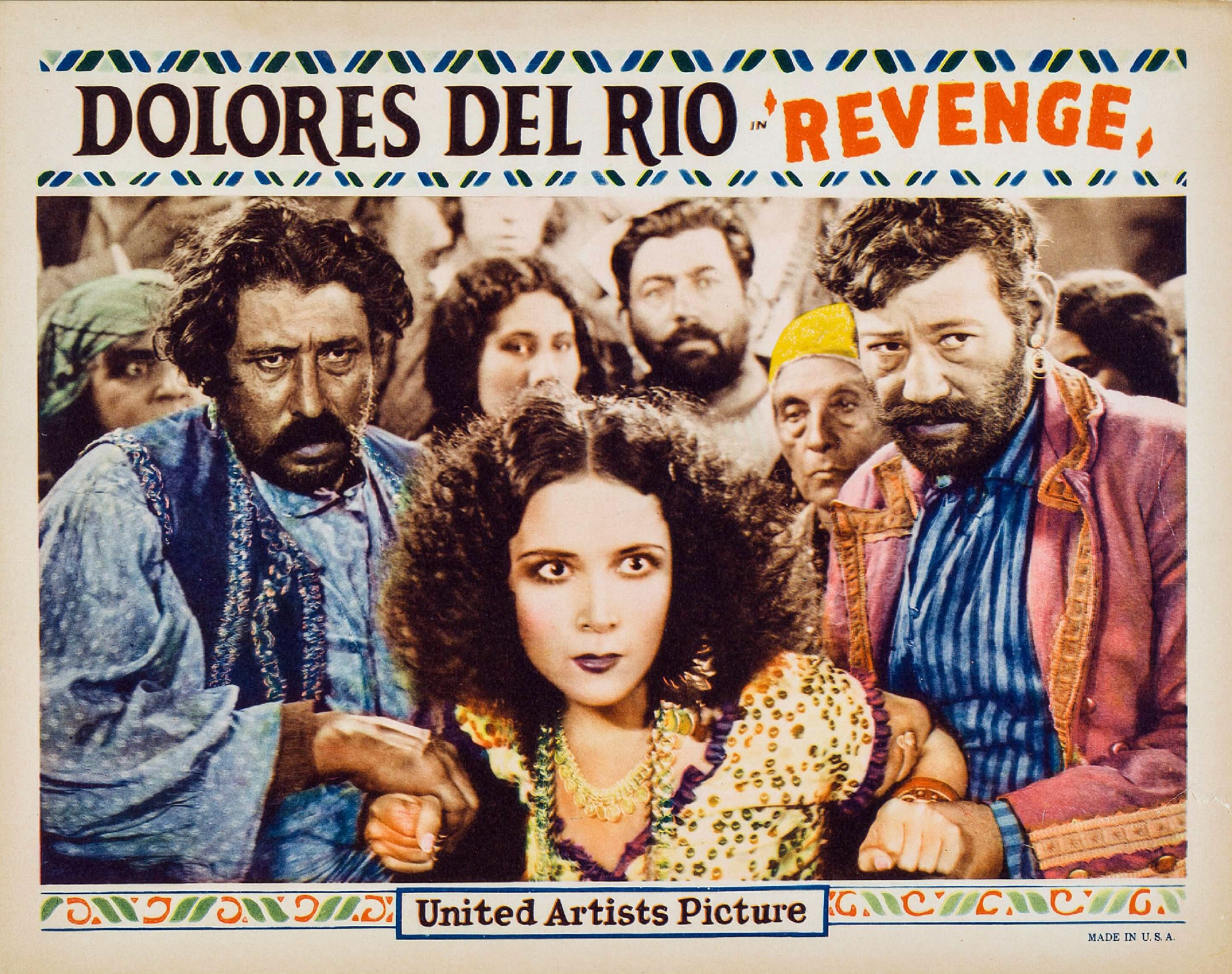
Lobby card for the U.S. drama film Revenge (1928), starring Dolores Del Rio

Though Hollywood had two Mexican star actresses in the 1920s (and the male star Ramon Novarro), there was still controversy over the stereotypical depictions of Latin Americans in film. In the 1920s, Latin America was Hollywood's largest export market. In Mexico, nearly 80 percent of all films screened were made in the United States. Nevertheless, Mexicans and other Latin Americans were often depicted on screen as lazy, barbaric, morally degenerate, or buffoonish. Mexican Americans, already facing an onslaught of discrimination in other aspects of their everyday lives, were concerned that such depictions were contributing to the prejudicial treatment they were receiving in the United States. Spanish-language newspapers criticized Hollywood "greaser" films' depictions of Latin Americans and even called on the Mexican government to take a stand against Hollywood. The Mexican government did launch an influence campaign, but its success was limited. According to one historian, "The Mexican immigrant community in Los Angeles used discussions about cinema to critique American racial and political ideologies."

=== Labor issues ===
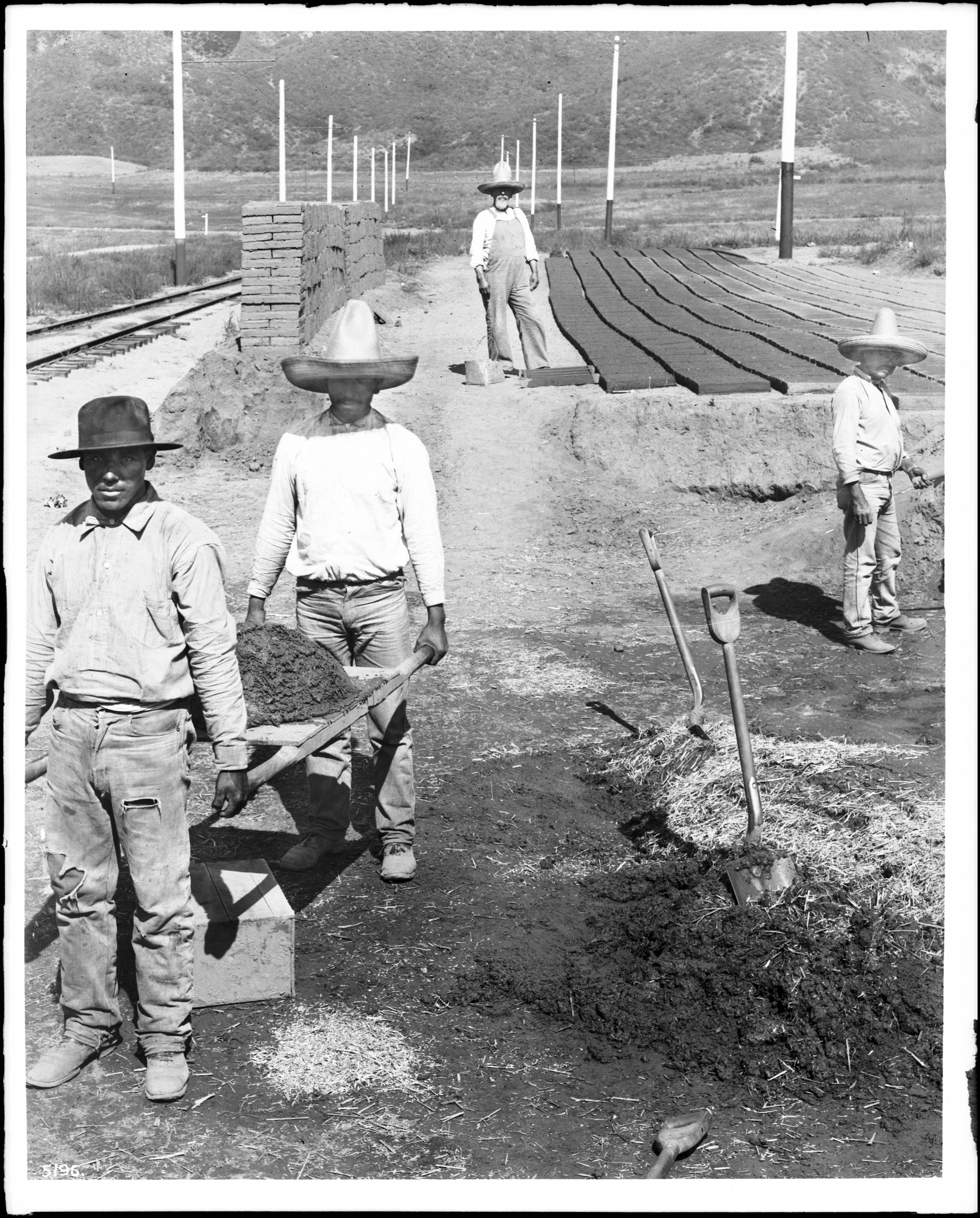
Mexican American workmen making adobe bricks at the Casa Verdugo, California

In the 1920s, Mexicans met the increasing demand for cheap labor on the West Coast. Mexican refugees continued to migrate to areas outside the Southwest; they were recruited to work in the steel mills of Chicago during a strike in 1919, and again in 1923. Many found work on the assembly lines of automobile factories in Detroit, and in the meat plants of Chicago and Kansas City.

Many also worked as agricultural laborers in farming valleys in the border states, such as Tucson in Arizona, the Rio Grande Valley in Texas, and most especially, the Imperial Valley in California. Anglo-Americans hired Mexicans and Mexican Americans to work in the region's year-round agricultural economy. Mexican farm laborers, along with African Americans, Filipino Americans, Japanese-Americans, and even Armenian Americans, Punjabi Americans, Native Hawaiians and Native Americans, were instrumental in California becoming the nation's top agricultural state. In this shift toward agricultural dominance, California relied on the cheap labor of Mexicans and Mexican Americans in a wide variety of fields. By the mid-1920s, California cotton farms were around five times larger than farms in the Deep South. This meant they needed large numbers of manual laborers, as well as technicians, since California farmers adopted tractors and picking machines at rates faster than any other region. The ability of Mexican laborers to adapt to industrial farming was crucial to the state's success. Nevertheless, even as labor unions in the 1920s grew rapidly to protect workers, some mainstream organizations, such as the AFL, were blatantly anti-Mexican. When Mexicans sought better working conditions, they often faced outright violence.

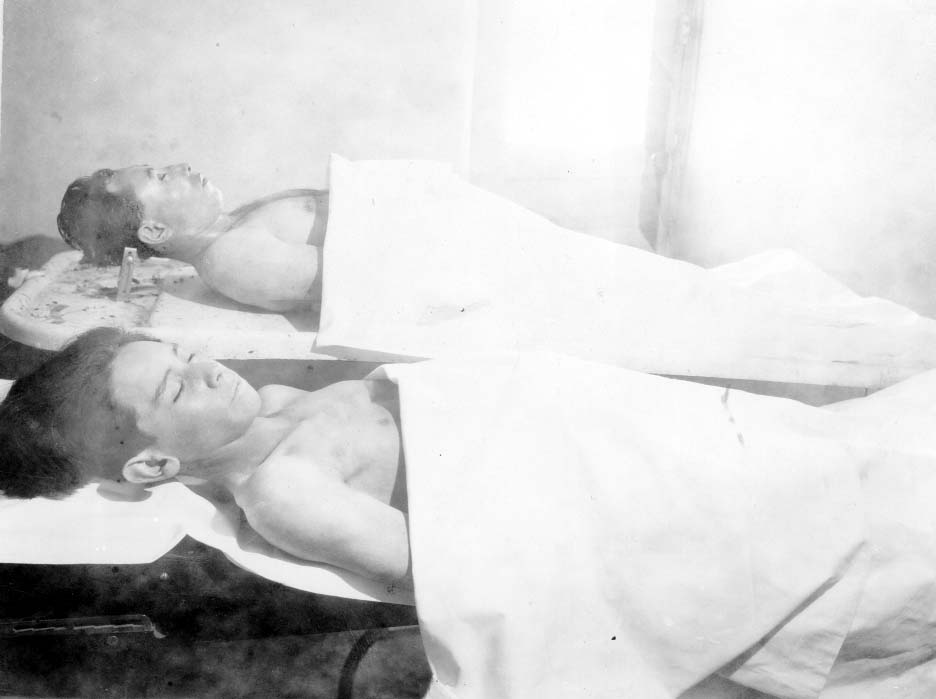
Salastino Martinez (age 15) and Klementz Chavez killed in Walsenburg, Colorado, 1928

Some of the decades' most infamous labor disputes occurred in Colorado. In 1927, Mexican-American coal miners participated in a bloody coal strike in Colorado, walking out under the banner of the Industrial Workers of the World. Mexican-Americans in the southeastern part of the state, particularly from the Walsenburg, Pueblo, and Trinidad areas, took leadership roles in the 1927 strike, protesting for better and safer working conditions. Some mine owners in other parts of the state retaliated against the striking miners by refusing to hire any Mexican or Mexican American in their mines. In Walsenburg and Trinidad, the mine owners went to more extreme measures to stymie the protests. Mine owners hired armed men to attack the Industrial Workers of the World's (IWW) Trinidad hall and Walsenburg branch halls. In Walsenburg, the men used a machine gun to attack the IWW hall, ultimately killing two union strikers, Salastino Martinez (age 15) and Klementz Chavez (age 41), on January 12, 1928. Josephine Roche, president of the Rocky Mountain Fuel Company, invited the United Mine Workers of America to unionize her mines, so as to meet some of the strikers' demands without alienating other mine owners, who remained strongly opposed to the IWW.

=== LULAC and activism ===
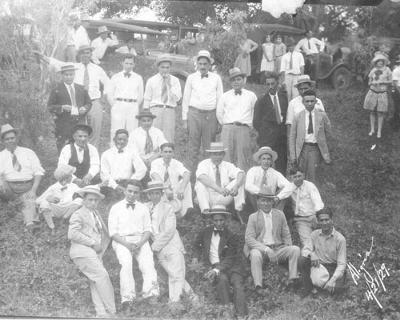
The first LULAC Convention, Texas, 1929

In 1929, the League of United Latin American Citizens (LULAC) was formed in Corpus Christi, Texas through the merging of several smaller Mexican American organizations. It was one of the nation's first mainstream Mexican American political organizations and was formed largely through the efforts of Mexican American World War I veterans who were frustrated at the continued discrimination Mexican Americans faced in the United States. Ben Garza served as the organizations' first president.

LULAC quickly developed into an influential middle-class civil rights organization with councils across the Southwest. Organization members tended to portray themselves as patriotic "white" Americans, and membership was restricted only to English-speaking U.S. citizens. Like the NAACP at this time, LULAC believed an "educated elite" Mexican American leadership would guide the community as a whole toward a higher political and economic standing in the United States. Nevertheless, the organization focused mostly on issues such as voter registration and poll tax fundraising-drives, aggressively waging legal campaigns against racially discriminatory laws and practices.

== Great Depression ==
=== Poverty ===
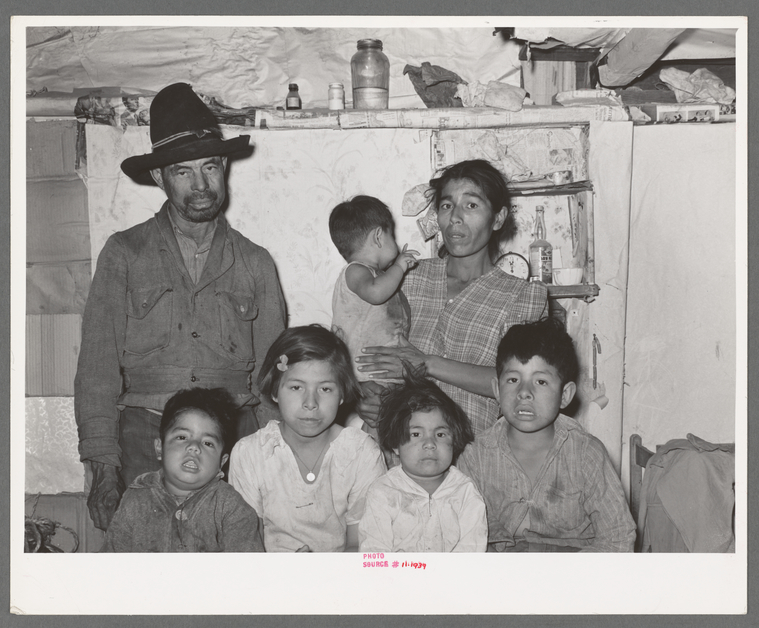
A Mexican family in Texas. The Great Depression hit communities of color hard.

The Great Depression started in the United States after a major fall in stock prices that began around September 4, 1929, and especially with the stock market crash of October 29, 1929, (known as Black Tuesday). The Depression had a major impact for the approximately one and a half million Mexicans and Mexican Americans living in the United States by 1930. Agricultural work fell as one of the depression's first casualties.

As white Americans increasingly found themselves unemployed, they grew outraged at the fact that farmers in the Southwest employed Mexican and Mexican American laborers. They mounted pressure campaigns on government officials and employers to insist that only "citizens" be hired. The campaigns were successful, and soon construction companies, stores, factories, and laundries fired their Mexican employees in favor of white Americans. The Hoover administration explicitly blamed Mexicans for taking jobs away from "American citizens".

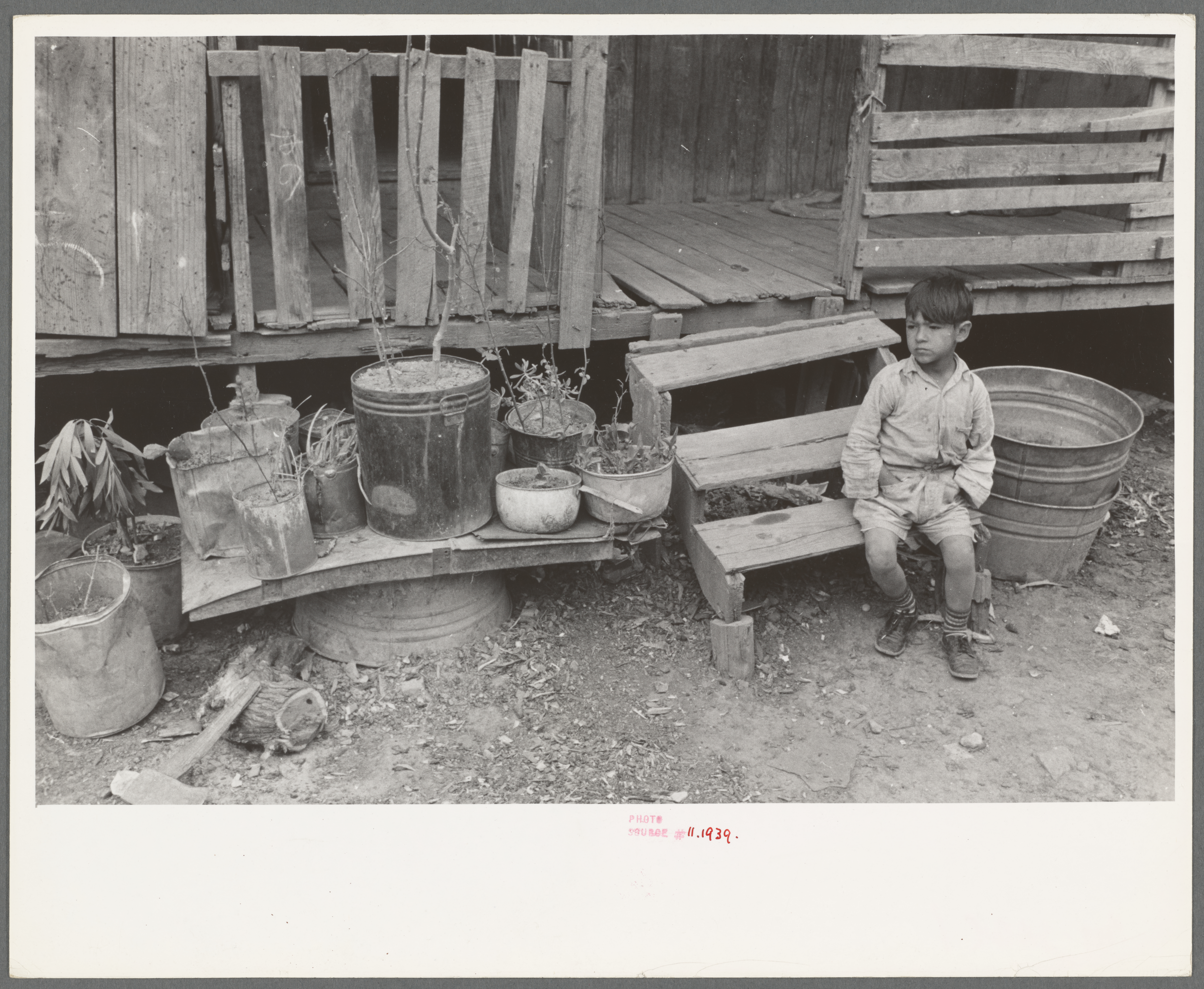
Mexican American boy in San Antonio, Texas

When Franklin Delano Roosevelt was elected president in 1932, there was hope he would provide relief to the suffering Mexican American communities across the United States. This did not materialize. While no New Deal program explicitly barred people by race or immigration status from receiving assistance, occupational status was used to exclude Mexican Americans from receiving Depression relief.

The Social Security Act of 1935, for example, barred agricultural and domestic workers from both social security benefits and unemployment insurance, which effectively excluded many African and Mexican Americans from this early social safety net. At the local level, few Mexican migrant laborers received relief, since residency restrictions often required the applicant to have lived in the county for a set amount of time, which excluded migratory laborers.

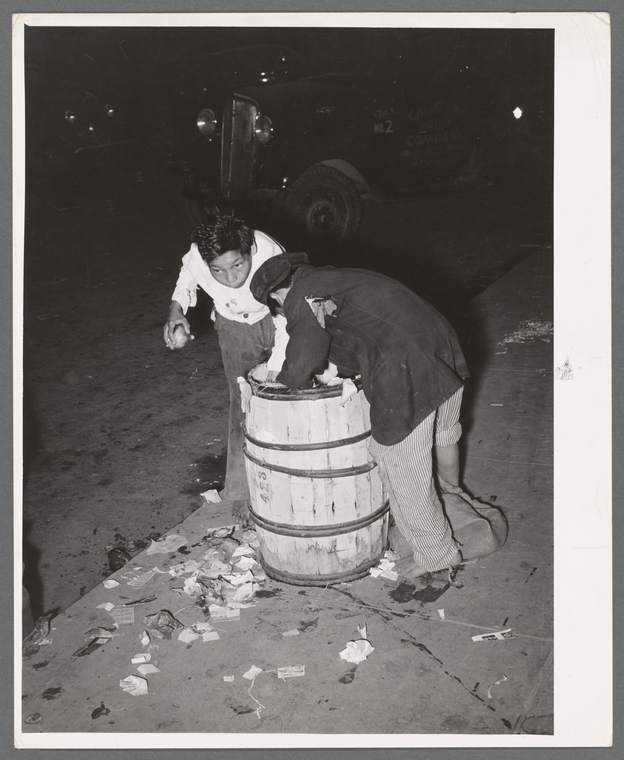
Two boys scavenging for food during the Great Depression in Texas

Without federal or local relief, many jobless Mexican American families adopted an itinerant life, traveling highways in search of work. Some found temporary housing in U.S. Farm Security Administration (FSA) work camps, where Mexican American farm families finally received medicine, food, and housing. Because the widespread culture of anti-Mexican demonization in the U.S. had resulted in targeted violence against Mexican American communities, however, the FSA was forced to set up separate camps specifically for Mexican Americans in order "to create safe havens from violent attacks" from white Americans.

These segregated camps brought together Mexican American families from various communities, which provided them with the opportunity to organize and discuss many of the main issues of the day, including the harsh working conditions within the agricultural sector. The familial connections developed in these camps would serve as a strong factor in farm labor movements later in the century. Yet, while the FSA work camps did provide relief for some Mexican American families, many others had a very different experience in the Depression. In many cities, when a Mexican or Mexican American family applied for aid, they were sent to designated "Mexican Bureaus", where repatriation was discussed.

=== Repatriation ===
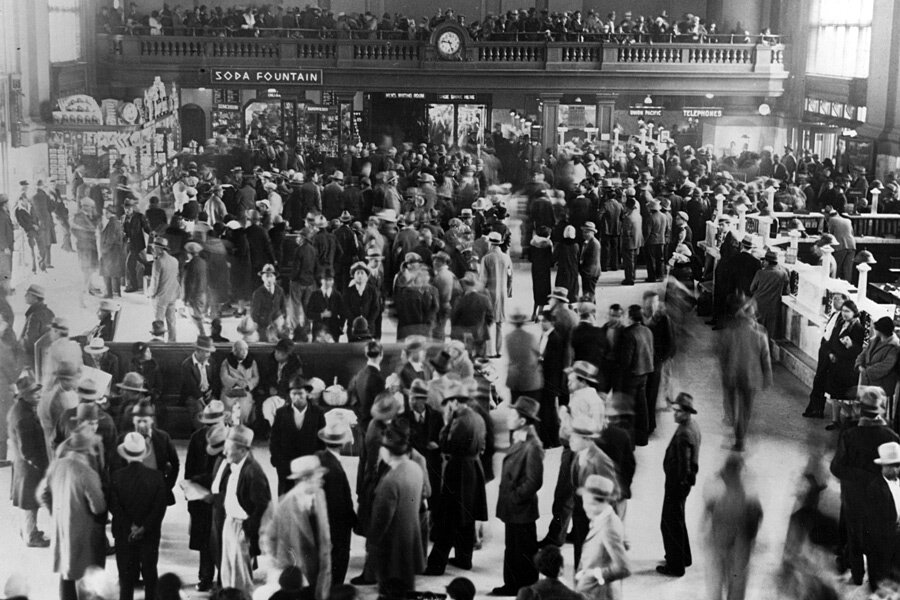
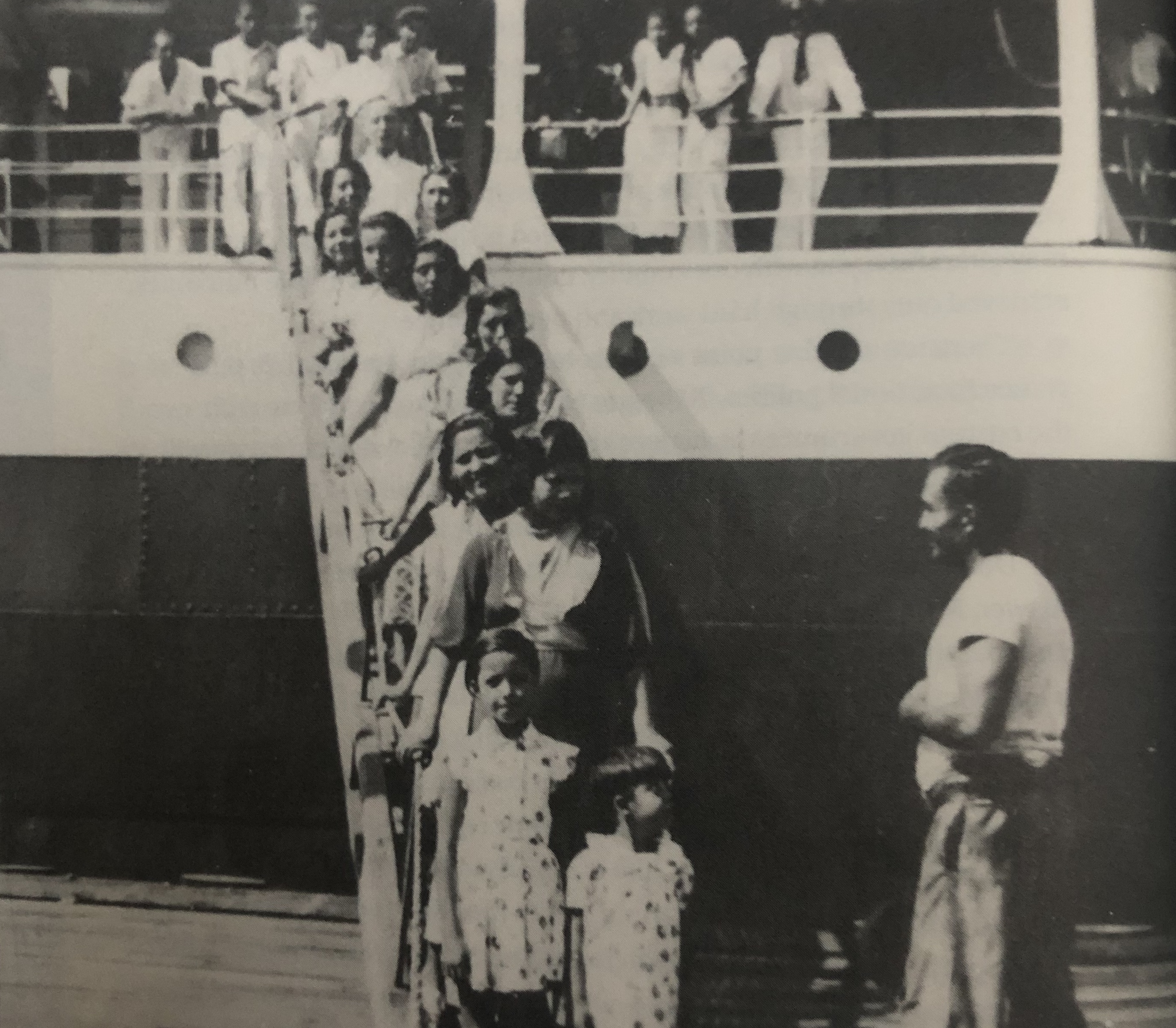
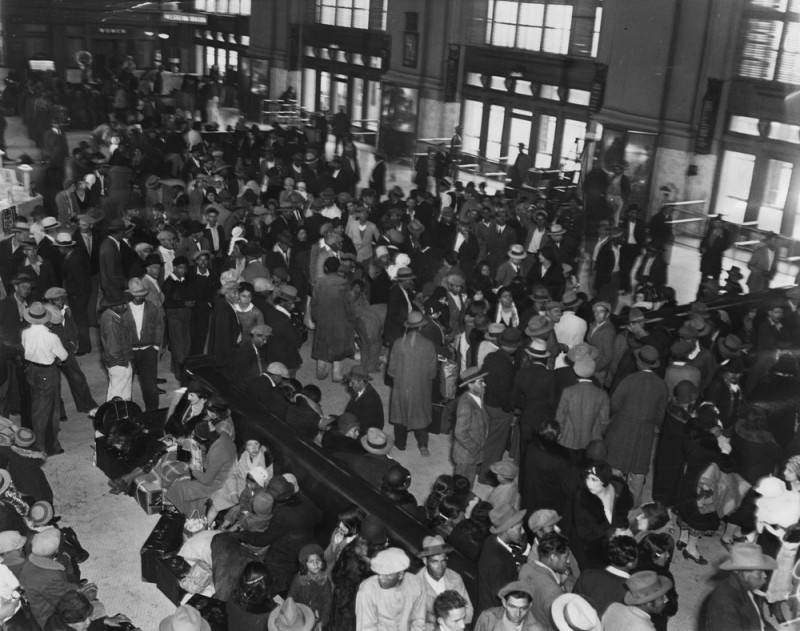
From 1929 to 1936, around 400,000 Mexicans and Mexican Americans repatriated via trains, boats, and buses, some forcibly.

For several hundred thousand Mexicans and Mexican Americans, their lives in the United States during the Great Depression were unbearable – they lost their jobs, were largely denied federal or local relief because of their ethnicity, and faced vilification in politics and in the media as "stealing jobs from real Americans". In addition to these factors, state and county officials across the U.S. began to threaten Mexican and Mexican American families who were seeking government aid with deportation.

The Mexican government introduced a program to entice ethnic Mexicans back to the country with the promise of free land if they returned. All of these factors – overwhelming poverty, the fear of threats from U.S. government officials, and the promises of the Mexican government – led many to leave the U.S. in a period known as the Mexican Repatriation.

These repatriations, though often initiated under threats of deportation, were considered "voluntary", and thus few federal records exist to provide numbers of how many Mexicans left the country during the Depression. Nevertheless, INS reported in 1931 that "large proportions" of the nation's Mexican population were leaving the country, and some estimates have concluded that between just November 1929 and December 1931, about 200,000 Mexicans left the United States. While a large number willingly departed to Mexico, a significant number were explicitly pressured to leave through state and local repatriation programs. These programs responded to the Depression's severe effects in Mexican and Mexican American communities by promoting deportation.

Some scholars contend that the unprecedented number of deportations and repatriations between 1929 and 1933 was part of an "explicit Hoover administration policy", and the manufactured climate of fear was meant to coerce Mexicans into self-repatriating. In fact, local welfare workers did regularly collaborate with immigration officials to provide the names of ethnic Mexicans seeking Depression relief so they might be repatriated.

During the Repatriation period, local government and federal officials also collaborated in "street sweeps" and "full-scale paramilitary" raids in majority-Mexican neighborhoods to find undocumented migrants and to terrorize others in the community to repatriate. In addition to welfare officials, charitable aid agencies worked with state and local governments to provide names of Mexican and Mexican American families seeking aid. Charities also sometimes provided money to pay for one-way tickets to Mexico. In all, the INS formally deported around 82,000 Mexicans from 1929 to 1935, while the remaining 320,000 repatriated were considered "voluntary". Of the total number of people who left the United States during the Mexican Repatriation, around half were U.S. citizens.

=== New Deal labor ===
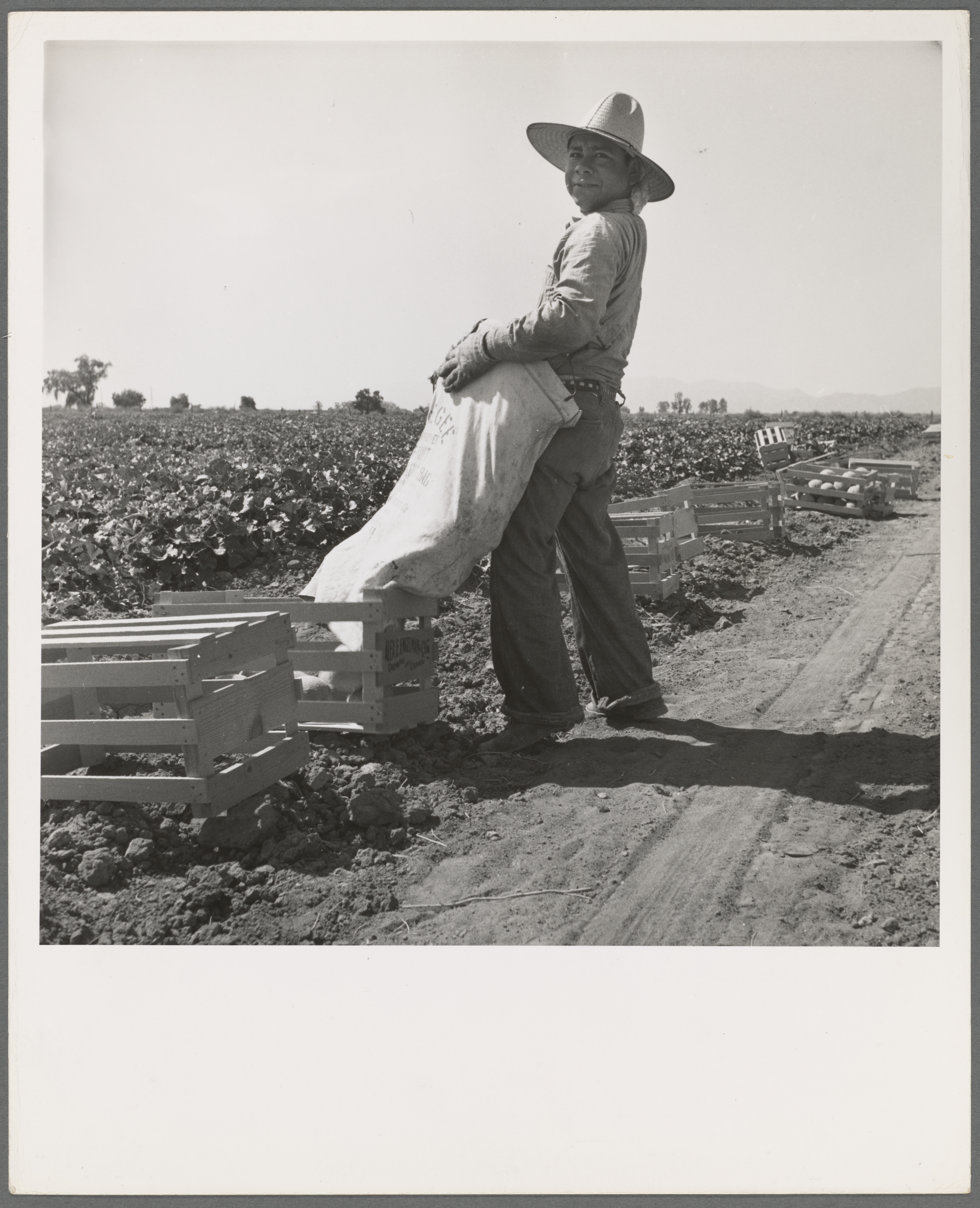
A Mexican melon picker of the Imperial Valley, unloading his bag during the depression

During the New Deal era, Mexican American labor unions made significant strides in organizing; however, they still often faced outright violence. In September 1933, the Cannery and Agricultural Workers' Industrial Union led a massive strike of cotton pickers in the San Joaquin Valley, California. One contemporary writer later described the mobilization of strikers as "an army of brown skinned people". In response, the growers initiated an all-out war to avoid paying the strikers higher wages.

They began with a propaganda campaign, claiming the strike was being agitated by a radical-left "Communist menace", rather than the workers themselves who were fighting against endemic low wages and horrific working conditions. Next, the farm owners created armed militias. One, Pixley's Farmers Protection Association, had 600 enrolled members. The farm owners then went after local business owners in town, threatening dire consequences to any business which sold the strikers food. Then, the farmers evicted all striking pickers and their families from their homes, which were usually shacks on the cotton ranches.

When the strikers still refused to break, news began to emerge of mysterious deaths in the cotton fields. The Mexican consulate sent a representative to Tulare County "to protect the interests of Mexicans". However, this did not stop local welfare officials from denying the strikers' families food relief during the strike. Law enforcement soon also stepped in to preserve "law and order", quickly deputizing an army of white locals and granting them "unlimited power". The Mexican American strikers were then openly attacked, and three were killed – but their killers were soon released with all charges dropped. Meanwhile, local and federal relief officials continued to deny the strikers any food relief, and soon scores of the strikers' children began to die from malnutrition. The U.S. federal government finally stepped in, establishing an arbitration committee. By the end of October 1933, a compromise was reached and the strike was finally ended.

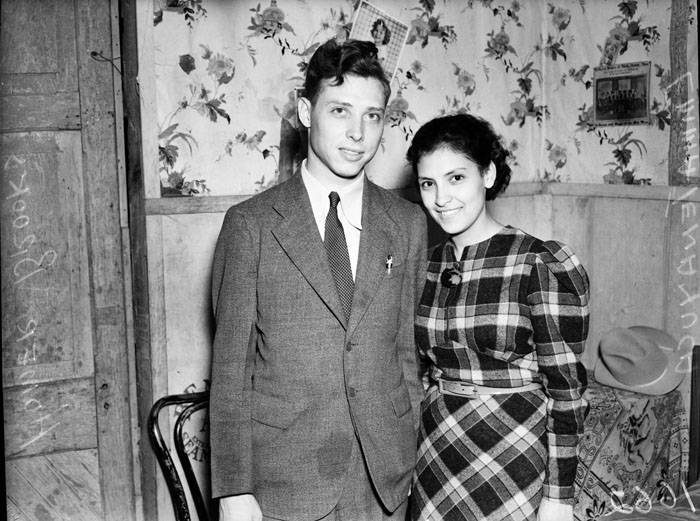
The labor organizer Emma Tenayuca and her husband Homer Bartchy on their wedding day, January 1937

The San Joaquin Cotton Strike of 1933 received national media coverage at the time, much of it in favor of the farm owners. However, Latino American labor activists did make major strides in the 1930s. Luisa Moreno, a Guatemalan immigrant, became the first Latina in U.S. history to hold a national union office when she became the Vice-President of the United Cannery, Agricultural, Packing, and Allied Workers of America. At the time, it was the seventh largest affiliate of the Congress of Industrial Organizations. Another important labor leader during the Depression was the 21-year old Emma Tenayuca, who was instrumental in one of the most famous conflicts of Texas labor history–the 1938 San Antonio pecan shellers strike at the Southern Pecan Shelling Company.

During the strike, nearly 12,000 workers at over 130 plants protested a wage reduction of one cent per pound of shelled pecans and inhumane working conditions by walking off the job. Mexicana and Chicana workers who picketed were clubbed, gassed, arrested, and jailed. A photo of Tenayuca ran in Time magazine where she was called "the forefront of most of its civil commotions".

=== Depression politics ===
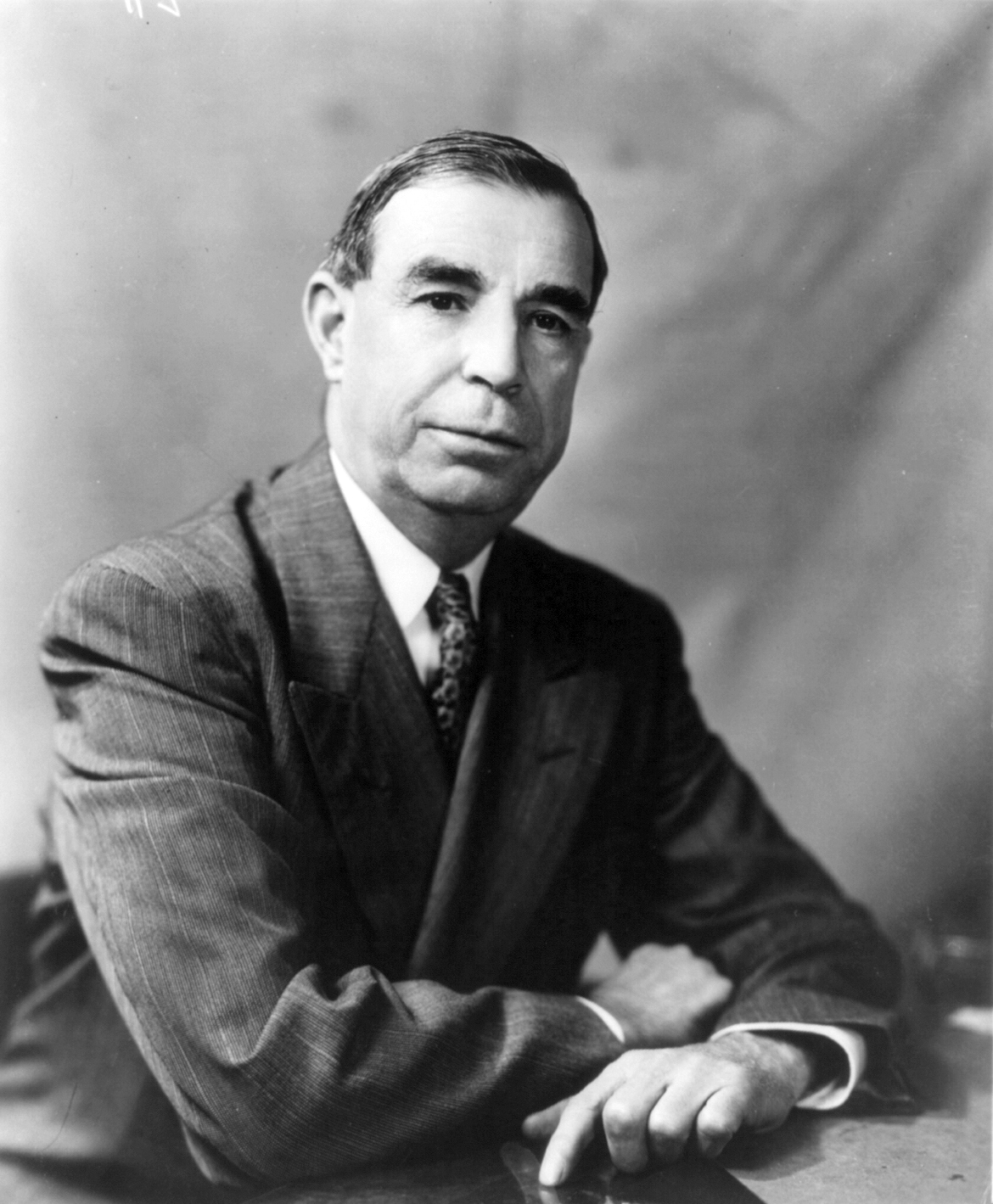
U.S. Senator Dennis Chavez, the first Latino to serve a full senate term

Despite the intense anti-Mexican sentiment pervading the country in the Depression, the era also saw the first Mexican American senators in the history of the country. Sen. Octaviano Larrazolo was elected to the U.S. senate in 1928, but he died in office three months later. Sen. Dennis Chávez first served in the United States House of Representatives from 1931 to 1935, until he was appointed to a full term in the U.S. Senate in 1934. When Chávez was sworn in, six senators allegedly stood abruptly, turned their backs to Chávez, and angrily left the chamber.

During his time in office, Senator Chávez was a major proponent of the New Deal, and he was at least partially successful at securing benefits for New Mexicans. What became known in New Mexico as the "Latino New Deal" was a rare extension of New Deal benefits to Mexican Americans. In the state, newly funded education programs improved literacy rates, and vocational programs revived the production of Hispano craft goods like santero artwork, woven goods, and furniture. WPA agents taught New Mexicans how to market their items to tourists. Later, Senator Chávez became known for his civil rights advocacy, as he fought to expand notions of American citizenship.

In 1935, a federal judge in New York upheld an immigration officer's decision to deny the naturalization petitions of three Mexicans on the grounds that they were not white, but instead individuals "of Indian and Spanish blood". Whiteness, which had been a requirement for naturalized citizenship since 1790, remained so until 1940. If the 1935 ruling had been upheld, it would have rendered the majority of Mexicans ineligible for citizenship. President Roosevelt – who had only recently replaced American interventionist policies, such as the Roosevelt Corollary, with his own diplomatic approach of the Good Neighbor Policy - was concerned that denying Mexicans the opportunity to naturalize would hurt Mexico-U.S. relations. He thus urged the State Department to "quiet the controversy", pressuring the judge to reverse the decision. The Labor Department issued guidance to its border officials that "in all future cases, [Mexican] immigrants be classified as 'white.'"

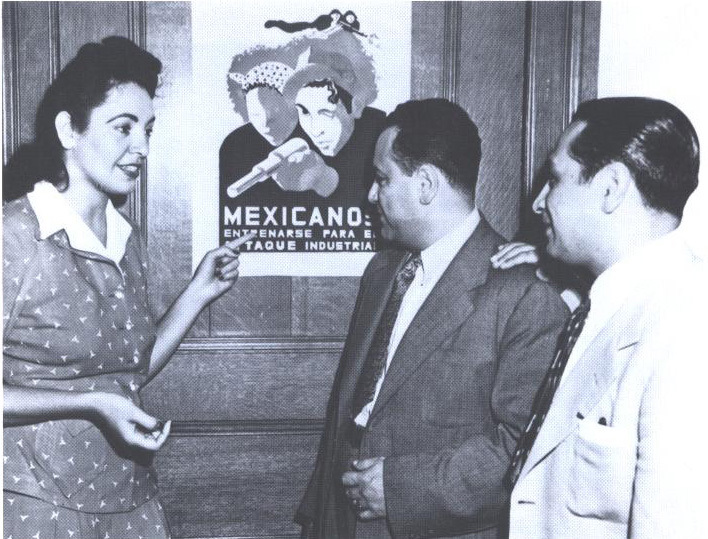
Josefina Fierro, a founder of El Congreso in 1938

In April 1938, Luisa Moreno and group of Mexican American labor activists, including Josefina Fierro, Eduardo Quevedo, and Bert Corona, organized the inaurural conference of El Congreso de Pueblos de Hablan Española in Los Angeles, an organization meant to promote a broad agenda of working class empowerment, civil rights, and Latino unity. In their founding constitution, the organizers also endorsed the rights of Mexicans to live and work in the U.S. without having to fear coerced deportation.

El Congreso also never promoted assimilation, in direct contradiction to other organizations like LULAC (which focused on the desegregation of employment, housing, education, and all public facilities). El Congreso was notable for their early stands promoting immigrant rights despite the widespread culture of demonization occurring during the Mexican Repatriation. In fact, Moreno spoke to the American Committee for the Protection of the Foreign Born, critiquing the exploitation of Mexican workers, saying, "[Mexicans make] a barren land fertile for new crops and greater riches. These people are not aliens, they have contributed their endurance, sacrifices, youth, and labor to the Southwest."

== World War II era ==
=== World War II ===
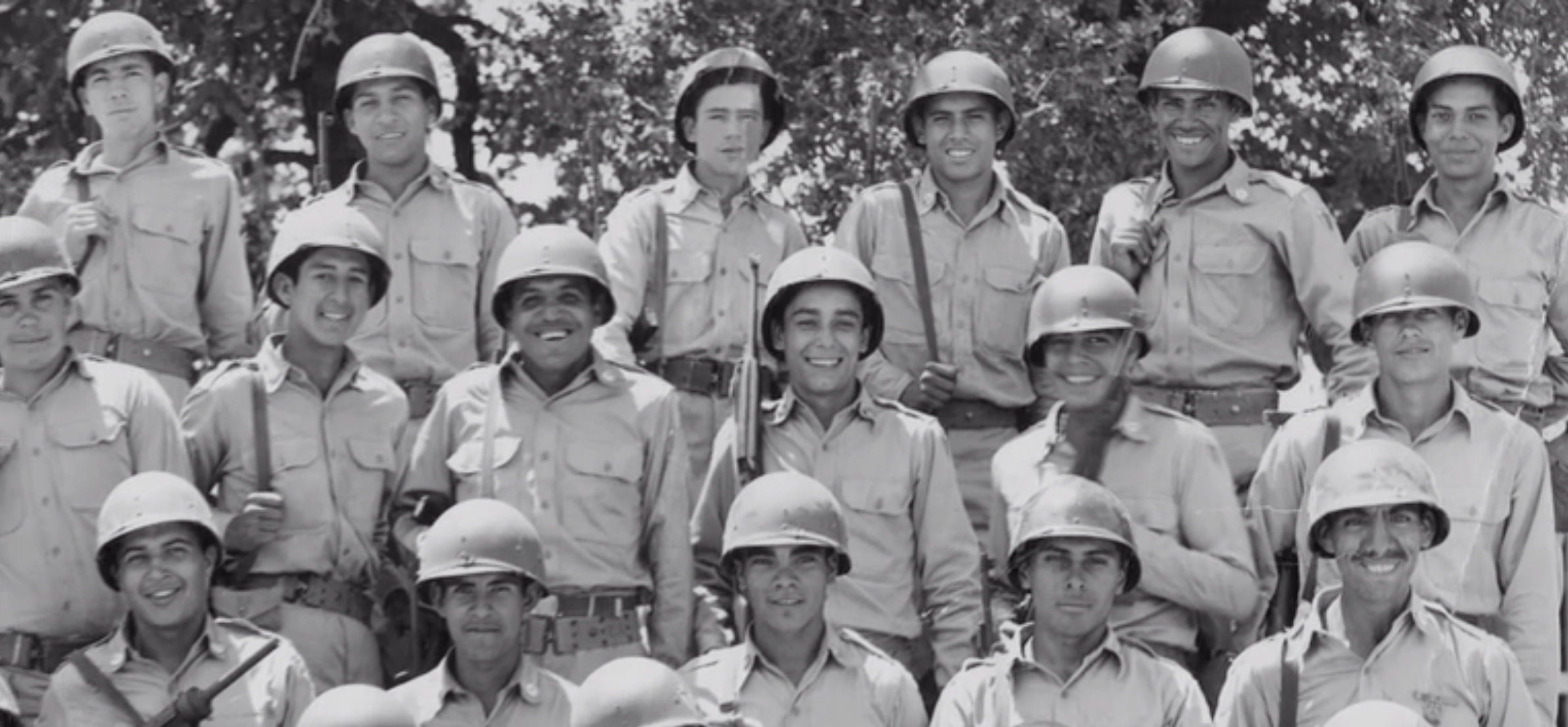
Mexican American servicemen in World War II, taken between 1941 and 1944

The United States entered World War II against the Axis Powers on December 7, 1941 after the attack on Pearl Harbor. Several hundred thousand Latino men served in the U.S. military during the war, about 500,000 of whom were Mexican American. Unlike their African American counterparts, who mostly served in segregated units, most Mexican American soldiers served in integrated units in World War II, though recent research has discovered at least one unit composed entirely of Mexican Americans.

The majority of World War II Mexican American service members were second-generation Americans who had grown up in the anti-Mexican hysteria of the Great Depression. Thus, the transition for them into the role of an "American soldier" could at times be surprising. One man, Private Armando Flores of Corpus Christi, Texas, remembered the shock he felt the first time he was ever referred to as an "American soldier", because, as he recalled later, "Nobody had ever called me an American before!"

According to some scholars, the U.S. government made efforts during the war to address some of the domestic issues facing the Mexican American community. These efforts were part of an overarching campaign to win broad domestic support for the war effort. Perhaps not surprisingly, this new feeling of wartime social "inclusion" created a strong sense of patriotic pride within the Mexican American community. On a single two-block stretch of Silvis, Illinois, 45 Mexican American boys and men volunteered to fight; it was dubbed in the press as "Hero Street".

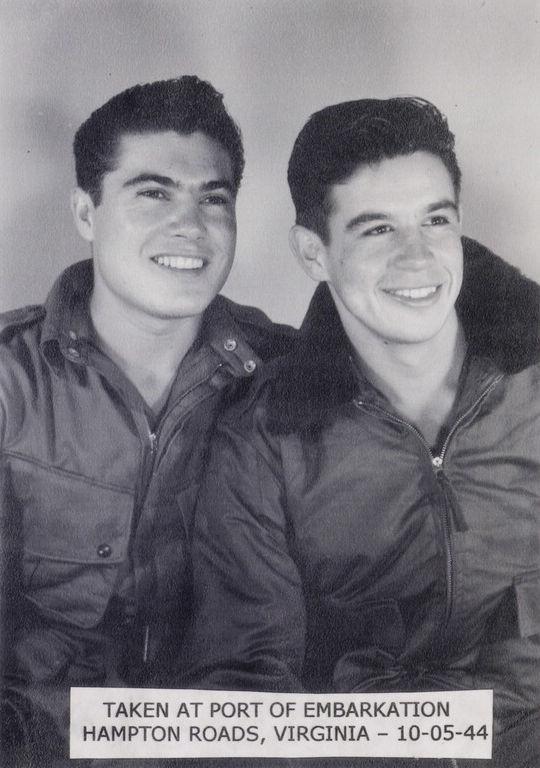
Ernest Gallego with first cousin, both serving in World War II

During the war, Mexican American soldiers gained renown for their bravery. At least eleven Mexican Americans received the Medal of Honor during the war. One, Joe P. Martínez, who was a beet harvester before the war, led a strategically critical charge up a snow-covered mountain on Attu Island. He died during the action, and became the first draftee to win the Medal of Honor posthumously. Another, Silvestre Herrera, explained his single-handed attack on a Nazi hold, saying, "I am a Mexican-American and we have a tradition. We're supposed to be men."

Perhaps the most famous Mexican American servicemen was Guy Gabaldon, an 18-year old from East Los Angeles, who had been adopted by a Japanese American family at the age of twelve. When his family was sent to an internment camp, Gabaldon joined the Marines. He was sent to the Pacific theater and saw action in Saipan. In the Battle of Saipan, Gabaldon killed thirty-three enemy combatants, and then, using his ability to speak conversant Japanese, Gabaldon convinced the surrounded remaining soldiers to surrender. The eight hundred Japanese soldiers surrendered peacefully, and Gabaldon earned the nickname the "Pied Piper of Saipan". Though he was recommended for the Medal of Honor, Gabaldon was instead awarded the Silver Star. The 1960 film Hell to Eternity was based on Gabaldon and his life.

=== Women's wartime labor ===
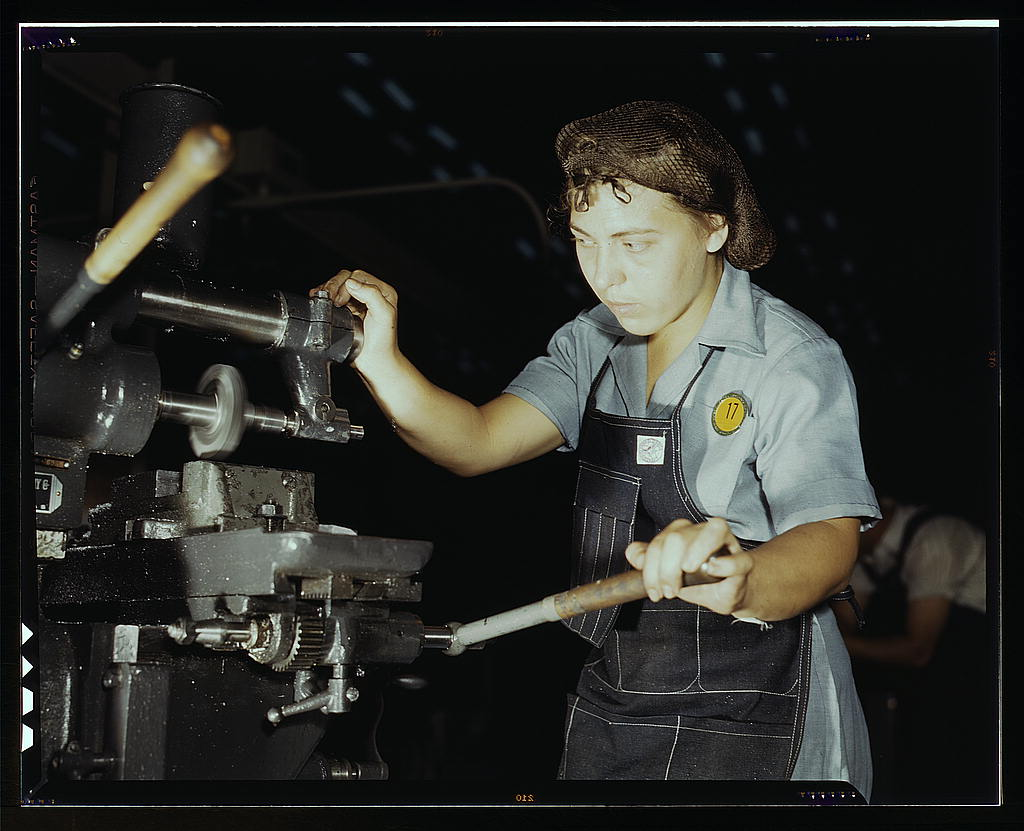
Rita Rodriguez, a woman from Ft. Worth, hard at work

Women played a hugely important role during World War II, entering the industrial workforce in record numbers to fill crucial manufacturing positions left empty by the departing soldiers. Additionally, countless Mexican American women joined Women's Army Corps, WAVES, and other all-female auxiliary units in the military. It is estimated thousands of Mexican Americans found jobs in the defense industries during the war, though they still often encountered anti-Mexican prejudice on the job market, despite Franklin Roosevelt's 1941 Executive Order 8802, which barred discrimination in defense industry hiring. Nevertheless, the war's insatiable demand for labor ultimately overcame employers' reluctance to hire Mexican Americans. Soon, thousands of Mexican American women across the country had joined the workforce as a "Rosita the Riveter".

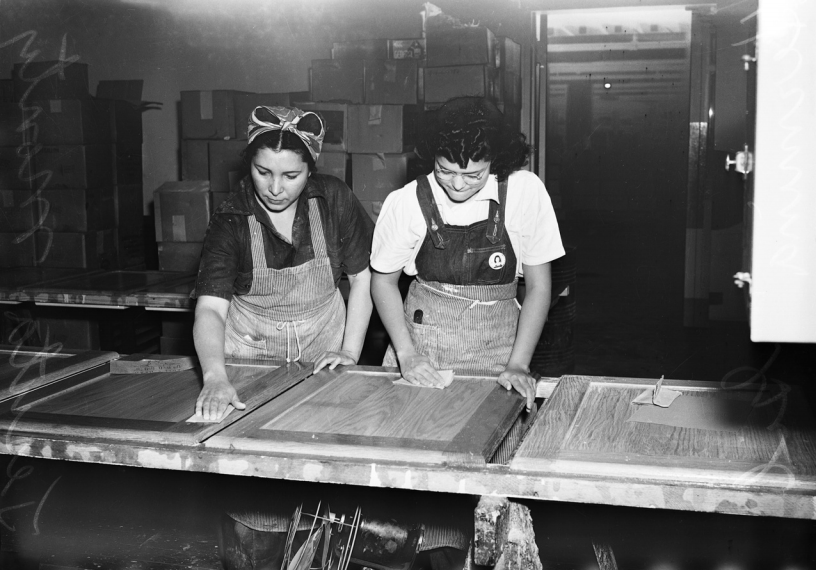
Mexican American women at Friedrich Refrigeration

In addition to efforts on the formal job market, Mexican American women made significant material and moral contributions through the formation of wartime community organizations. These organizations aimed to support American troops abroad, but specifically the young Mexican-American soldiers from local barrios. A few community projects consisted of cooperation between Mexican American and Anglo neighborhoods, yet the vast majority of Mexican American home front activities were organized separately from those of the white community.

One of these organizations, the Spanish-American Mothers and Wives Association of Tucson, Arizona, sought to roll bandages, raise money for a veterans center for after the war's end, and write letters to help the boys fight their "internal battle of loneliness". The organization peaked at 300 members during the war. Other organizations, such as Phoenix' Lenadores del Mundo, organized wartime festivals and collected rubber for the war effort, but also sought to fight against the still rampant racism and discrimination experienced by the community.

=== Sleepy Lagoon murder ===
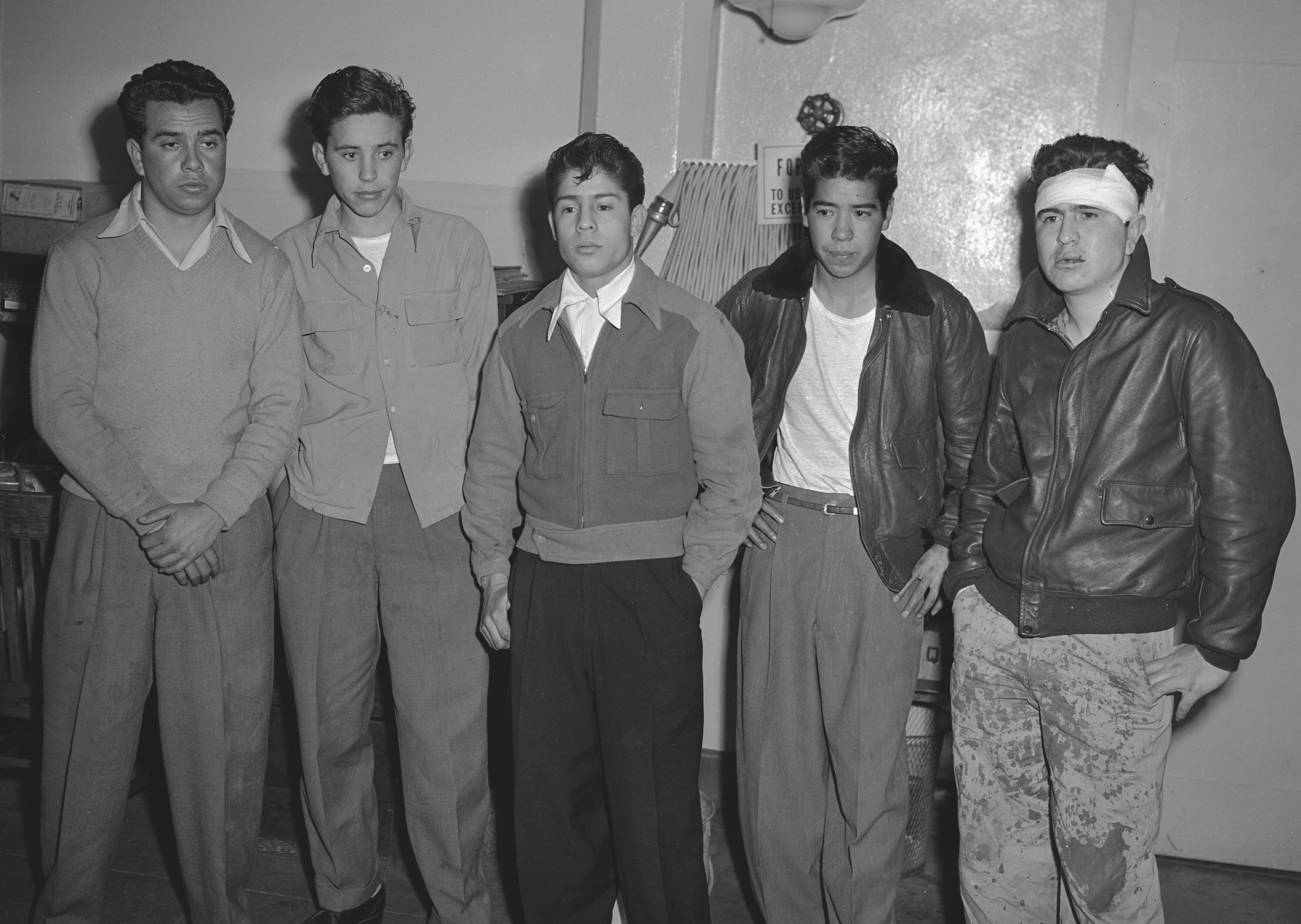
Mexican American "gang" brought in for questioning regarding the murder

In late-1942, California Governor Culbert Olson, who was facing a tough re-election battle against future incumbent Earl Warren, sent a memo to Los Angeles County's law enforcement agencies, ordering them to launch a vicious campaign against the city's youth gangs. Under these orders, the office of the Los Angeles County District Attorney decided to use the August 2, 1942 death of José Gallardo Díaz, a Mexican American youth, as a test case to launch the new war against juvenile delinquency by turning the investigation into a major media event.

In the weeks following Díaz' death, the LAPD launched mass raids in Mexican and African American neighborhoods, arresting more than 600 young men and women to be held in custody and interrogated. The Los Angeles press hailed the arresting officers as heroes. As a result of their often brutal interrogations of the adolescents, the police announced they had found the murderers: twenty-two alleged members of the 38th Street gang and two female accomplices. The public discourse in California surrounding the arrest of the youths was viciously racist, and high-profile debates emerged whether Mexicans and Mexican Americans were "culturally, politically, intellectually, and biologically capable of living within a white, civilized, democratic society".

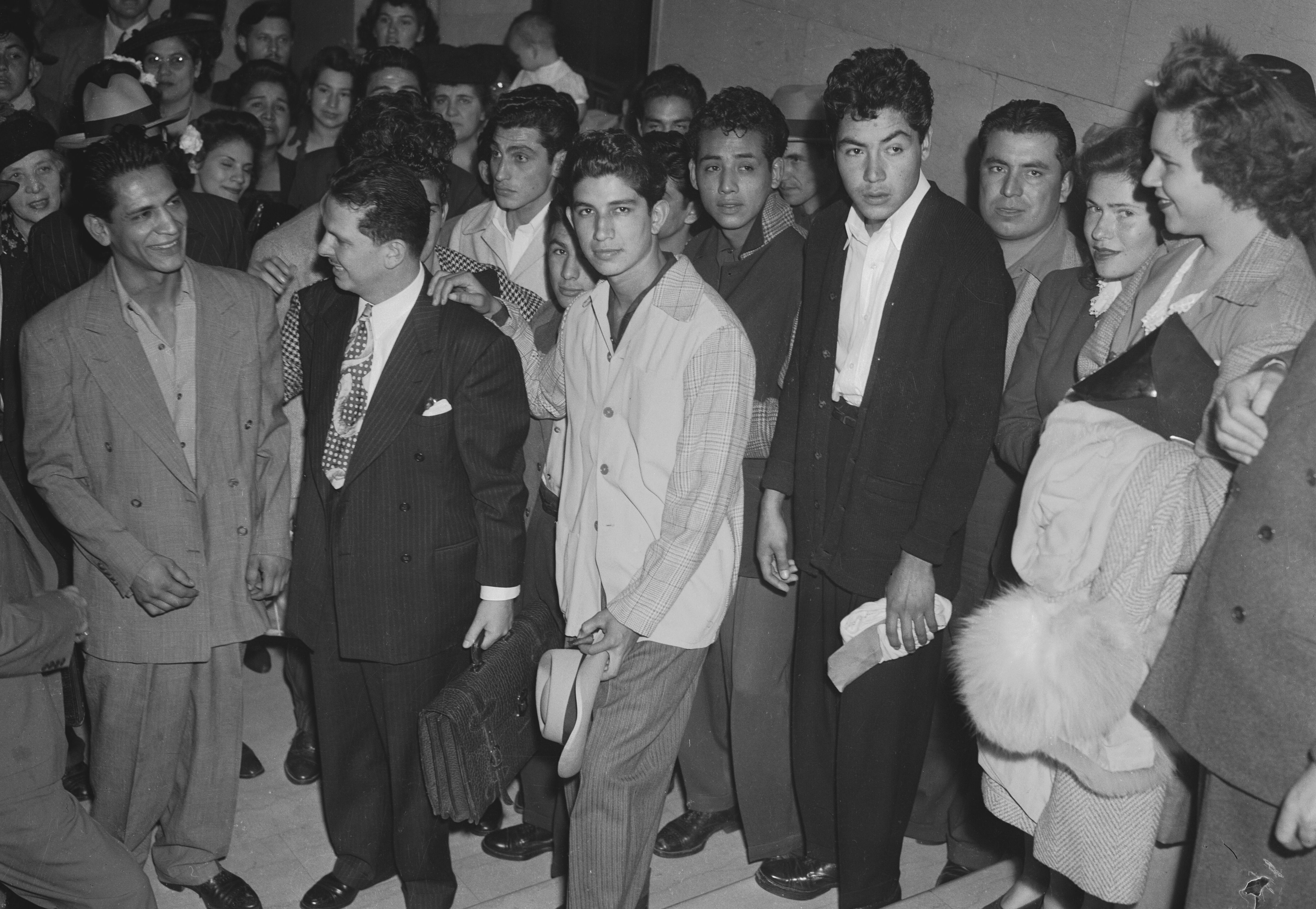
The Sleepy Lagoon murder case acquittal, Los Angeles, October 1944

The resulting criminal trial, People v. Zammora (1942), is infamous for its fundamental denial of due process. Of the twenty-four charged youth, seventeen were indicted on murder charges and placed on trial. The courtroom was small and, during the trial, the defendants were not allowed to sit near, or to communicate with, their attorneys. None of those charged were permitted to change their clothes during the entirety of the trial by order of the presiding Judge Charles W. Fricke at the request of the district attorney. Judge Fricke also permitted the chief of the Foreign Relations Bureau of the Los Angeles sheriff's office, E. Duran Ayres, to testify as an "expert witness" that Mexicans as a community had a "blood-thirst" and a "biological predisposition" to crime and killing, citing the supposed human sacrifice practiced by their Aztec ancestors.

After Judge Fricke's guilty verdict in January, the Mexican-American youths were imprisoned. The Mexican American community was outraged and several attorneys challenged Judge Fricke's decisions. The famous journalist Carey McWilliams noted that a few months earlier, over 120,000 Japanese Americans were detained and interned in detention camps, and argued that there were common links between the Japanese-American internment and the anti-Mexican response to the Sleepy Lagoon case. In October 1944, the state Court of Appeals unanimously decided the evidence was not sufficient to sustain a guilty verdict. It reversed 12 of the defendants' convictions and directly criticized Fricke for his bias in and mishandling of the case.

=== Zoot Suit Riots ===
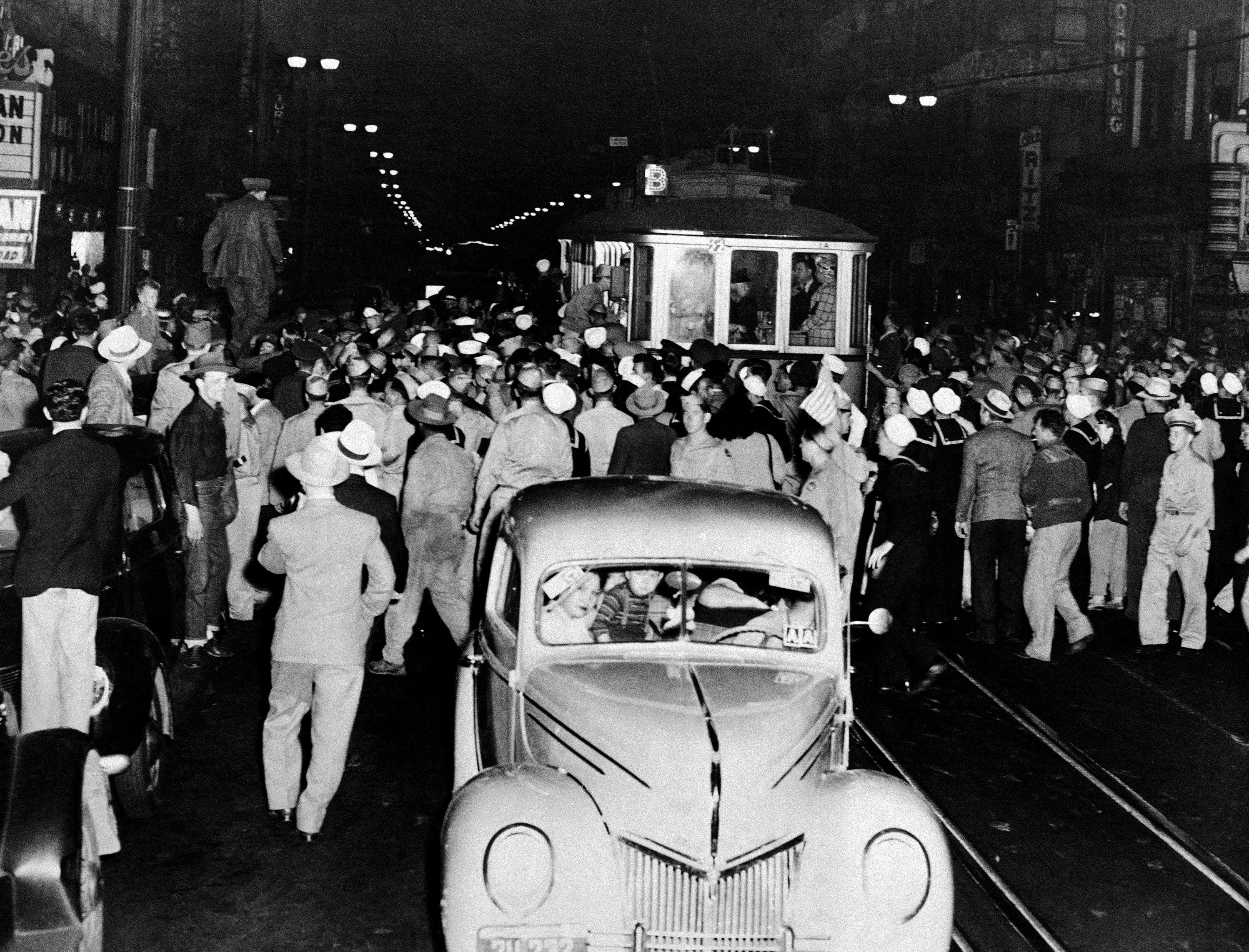
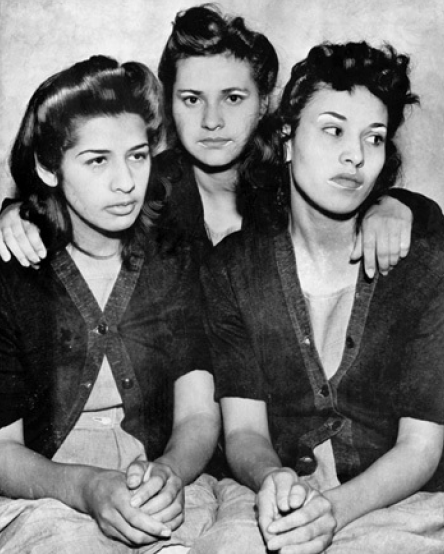
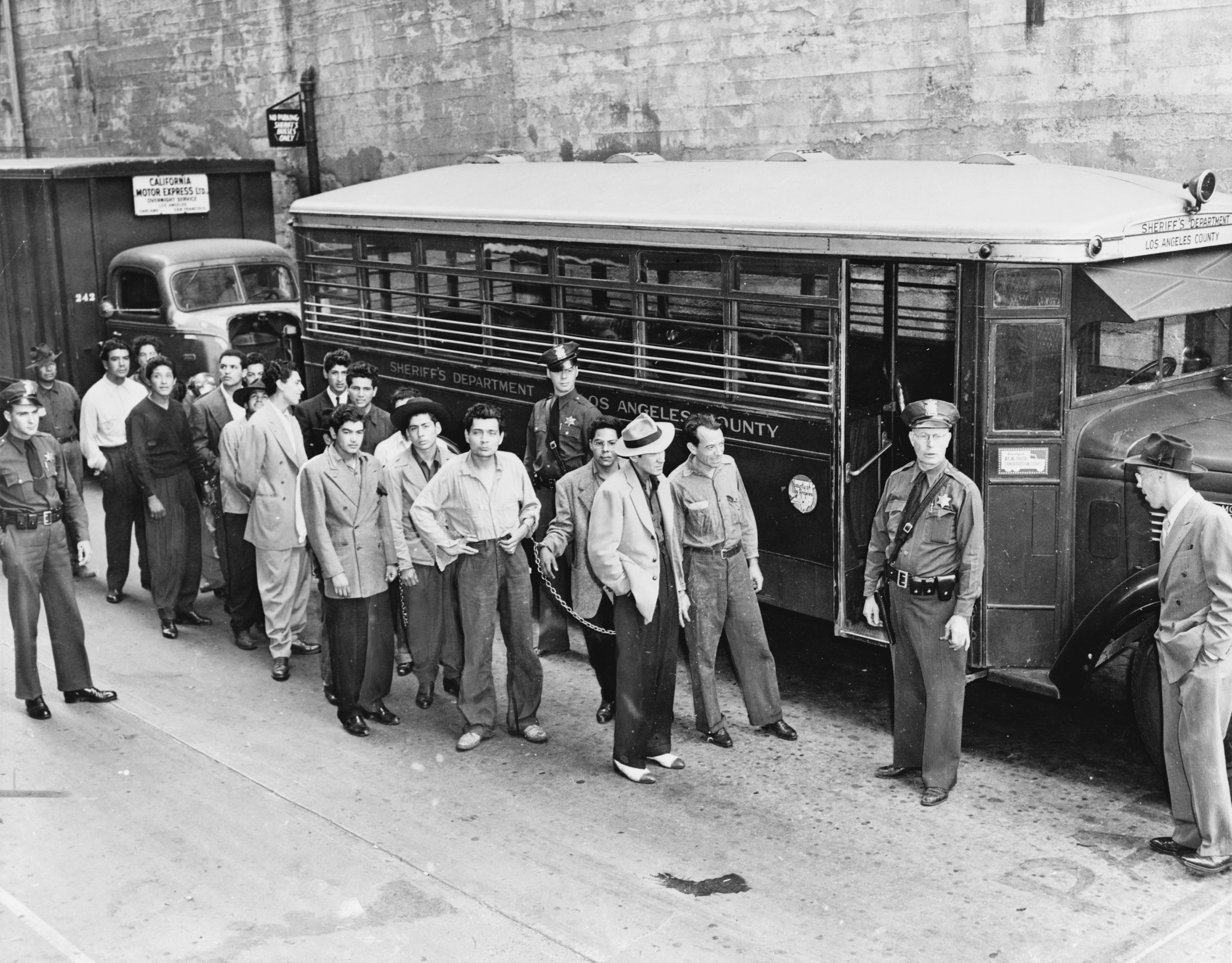
During the Zoot Suit Riots, U.S. Navy sailors beat and stripped over 150 Mexican American boys. The LAPD responded to the violence by arresting over 500 Mexican American teen boys and girls.

In the 1940s, Mexican American youth had grown up fully immersed in American popular culture, including films, music, and other media. When they came of age, these youth diverged from the expectations of both their parents and dominant society by using culture and fashion to undermine the norms of American segregation and white supremacy. These teens developed their own music, language, and dress. For boys, called Pachucos, the style was to wear a flamboyant long coat zoot suit with baggy pegged pants, a pork pie hat, a long key chain and shoes with thick soles. The style was meant to serve as a rebuke of American assimilation and war efforts to conserve materials like fabrics.

Meanwhile, girls, called Pachucas, wore black drape jackets, tight skirts, fishnet stockings and heavily emphasized make-up. For the Pachucas, participation in the movement was a way to openly challenge conventional notions of feminine beauty and sexuality, especially in traditional Mexican culture. In both instances, the Zoot-suiters were considered un-American.

This sentiment created issues in Los Angeles, where a new Navy base was installed in Chavez Ravine, a segregated Mexican American neighborhood of Los Angeles. This brought over 50,000 service members into a largely Mexican neighborhood, many of whom were white and from areas with few Mexican Americans. The sailors – who frequently walked through the Chavez Ravine neighborhood on their way to the bars in Downtown Los Angeles - would harass the Zoot-suited youth for their seemingly disrespectful attitudes. As the anti-Mexican atmosphere surrounding the Sleepy Lagoon murder trial grew more tense over the course of 1943, minor attacks by Navy sailors against Mexican American boys became an almost daily occurrence.

In June 1943, these tensions exploded in one of the worst race riots in the city's history. After a Mexican American boy raised his hand in a way that a sailor considered to be "threatening", the man and his friends attacked the boy. This sparked a skirmish in the street, which ended quickly after the initial sailor had his nose broken. That night, hundreds of sailors went into the neighborhood and attacked every Mexican American boy they could find. For the next ten straight days, the Navy sailors went into Chavez Ravine, Downtown LA, and even East Los Angeles, dragging, beating, and stripping naked every Zoot suited boy out in public – some as young as twelve and thirteen years old.

The Los Angeles press cheered on the racist attacks, even printing guides on how to "de-zoot" a zoot-suiter. The LAPD responded by joining the sailors, arresting hundreds of Zoot suiters, both teenaged boys and girls, and charging them with "disturbing the peace". Progressive activists at the time, such as Carey McWilliams, blamed the riots on William Randolph Hearst's "proto-fascist" promotion of "anti-Mexican hysteria" during the Sleepy Lagoon murder trial. Scholars, however, have focused on the complex social matrix operating within Los Angeles at the time, and interpret the riots as an example of the "social cleavages" within the segregation-era U.S.

=== Postwar activism ===
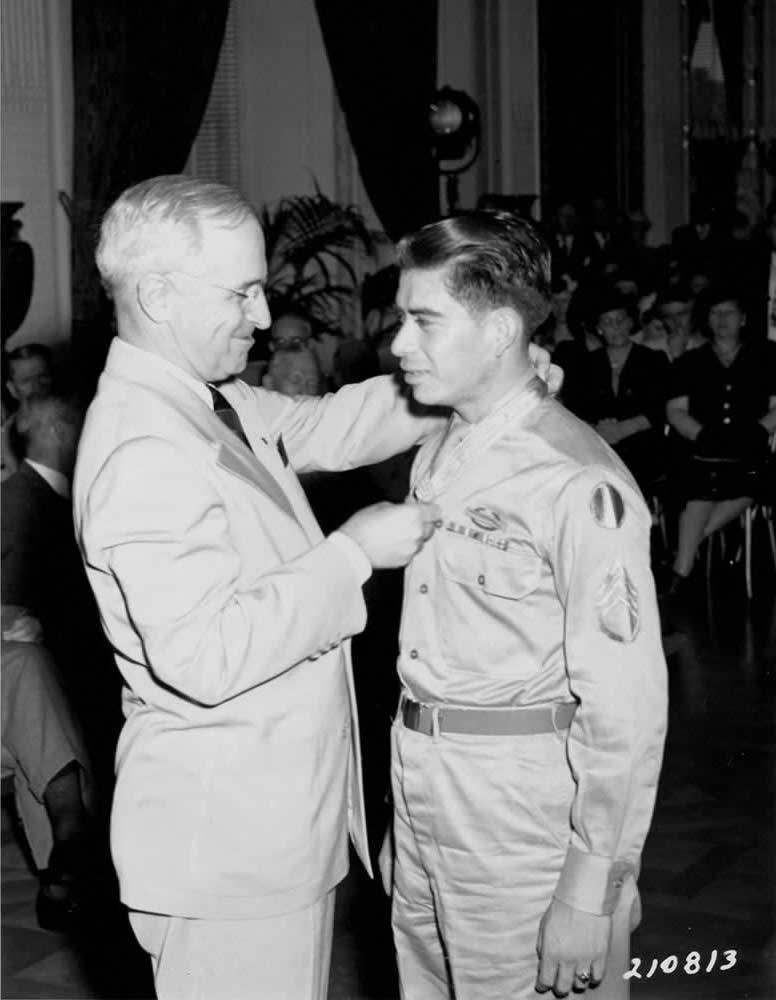
Macario Garcia, receiving the Medal of Honor from President Harry Truman. A month later, he was refused service at a Texas cafe because of his ethnicity. He refused to leave the cafe and was arrested.

World War II formally ended on September 2, 1945 after the atomic bombings of Hiroshima and Nagasaki, and the final surrender of Japan to the Allied powers. For the millions of returning veterans, the adjustment back to civilian life was difficult. For African and Latino Americans, in particular, there was significant difficulty transitioning from being war heroes and liberators in Europe, back into second-class citizens in the race-segregated United States. African Americans had sought to address some of these discrepancies with their Double V campaign; meanwhile, Mexican Americans began their own fight for civil rights at home. The historian Thomas A. Guglielmo writes, "Patriotic sacrifice and service only further fired Mexicans' and Mexican Americans' determination to gain first-class citizenship."

Returning Mexican Americans challenged discrimination and segregation in many ways, including by sitting in "whites only" seating sections in town theaters, demanding service at white restaurants, and attempting to enter segregated public pools. In one notorious instance, Macario Garcia received the Medal of Honor in a ceremony at the White House, and less than a month later, he was refused service at the Oasis Cafe in Richmond, Texas because of his ethnicity. He refused to leave the cafe, the police were called, and Garcia was arrested and charged with "aggravated assault". In Arizona, the governor named August 14, 1945 in honor after another Medal of Honor recipient, Silvestre Herrera. Coverage of the event was marred, however, by the governor's need to request Phoenix businesses to take down signs barring Mexicans.

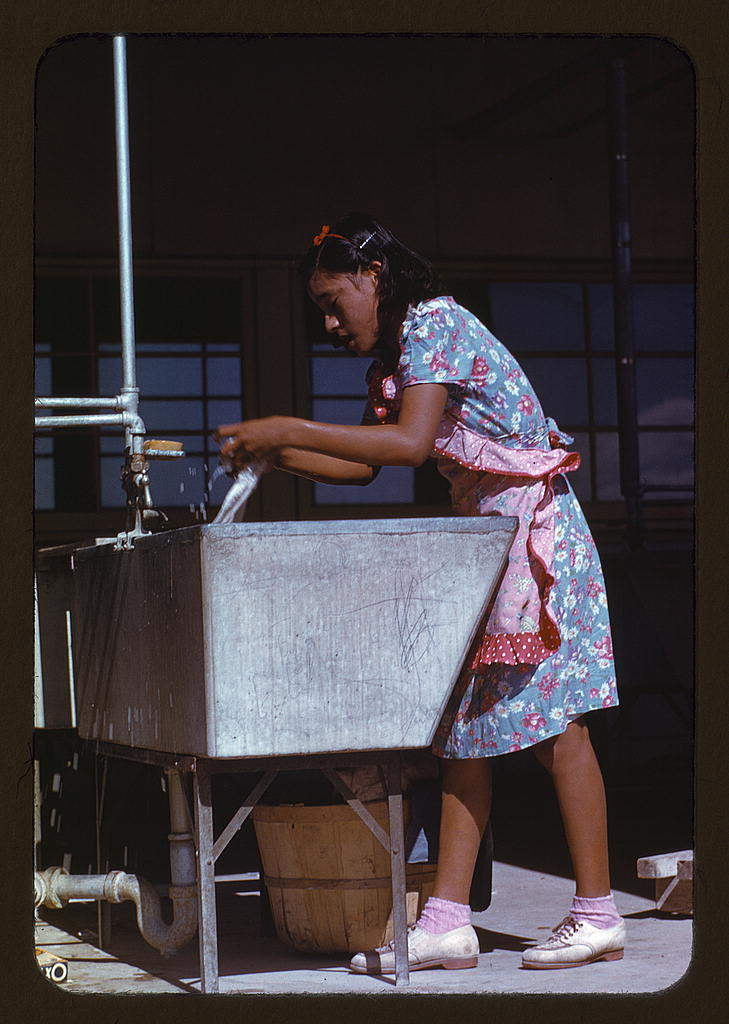
Many Mexican Americans were denied the full benefits of the GI Bill. As a result, many Mexican American families remained in cycles of poverty.

Discrimination against returning Mexican American veterans hurt the prospects of the entire Mexican American community. While medical, financial, and educational benefits from the GI Bill helped lift millions of Anglo-American families into the growing American middle-class, the application of the bill's benefits to African and Mexican American veterans was uneven. As a result, the Mexican American community did not ever gain full economic and political equality in the postwar era. Rather than being simply exclusionary, however, the GI Bill had several important failings which resulted in its discriminatory outcomes. The bill offered loan guarantees, yet few banks honored such guarantees to non-white veterans, and for those who did, restrictive racial covenants meant that African and Mexican American veterans were only able to live in redlined neighborhoods, where property values often remained low.

Furthermore, many Mexican American veterans complained about consistently late tuition disbursements, which forced them to drop out of their job training and university programs, and reports of "outright racism within the VA" were common. Contemporary scholars have found that overall, the GI Bill "did not profoundly alter the occupational profile of all Mexicans ... and its immediate impact on upward mobility among families ... was inconsistent".

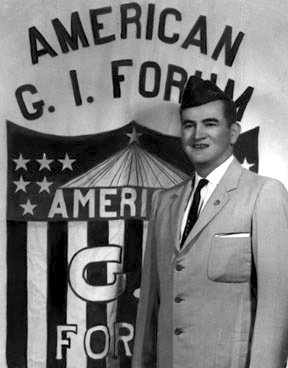
Hector P. Garcia, World War II veteran, civil rights advocate, and founder of the American G.I. Forum

Some of these issues were challenged directly. In 1948, the Corpus Christi physician, Hector P. Garcia, founded the American GI Forum in order to demand equal rights to GI Benefits, medical care, burial rights, desegregated education, and other civil rights. In a famous early instance of the Forum's civil rights advocacy, Garcia took up the case of Private Felix Longoria of Three Rivers, Texas. Longoria had died in combat in 1945, but his remains weren't shipped home for several years. When they finally arrived, his widow Beatrice went to the local funeral home to plan a wake in his honor.

The funeral home director refused to allow the family to use the chapel, because of their race. The director told the media at the time that he would never allow Mexican Americans to use his facilities, saying, "We just never made it a practice to let them use the chapel and we don't want to start now." When Garcia found out about the situation, he was outraged and immediately sent letters of protest to the media, elected politicians, and government officials. One of these letters was sent to Texas' junior senator, Lyndon B. Johnson, who arranged for Longoria to receive full honors and burial at Arlington National Cemetery. The Longoria incident pushed the American G.I. Forum to the forefront of the postwar Mexican American civil rights strategy. The Forum, alongside LULAC and El Congreso, greatly expanded their operations after World War II and began their fights to end segregation.

=== Court cases ===
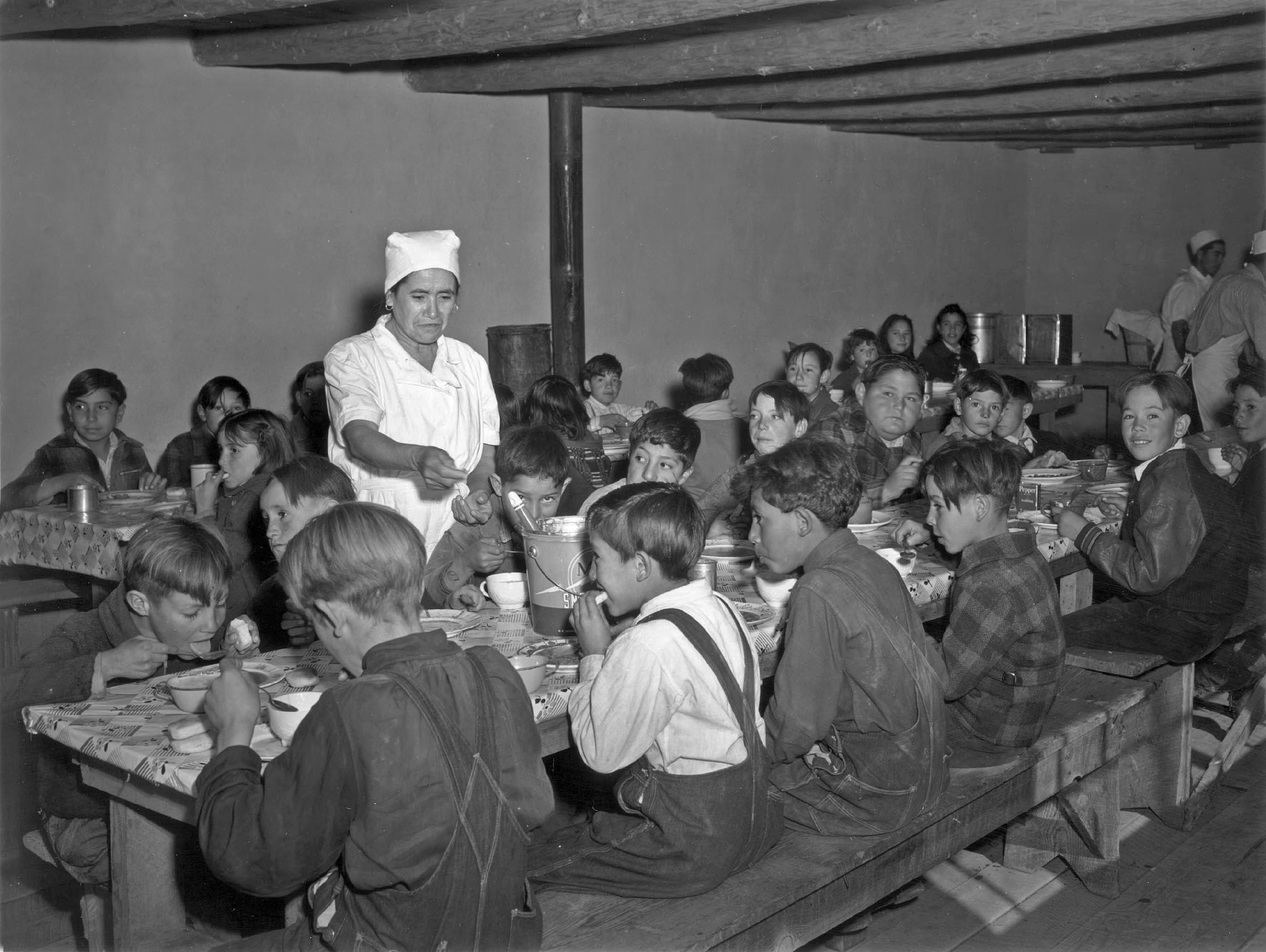
Segregated school for Mexican American children in New Mexico

In the 1940s, there were two major court cases involving the civil rights of Mexican Americans. The first, Mendez v. Westminster (1947), involved Gonzalo Méndez, a naturalized U.S. citizen born in Mexico, and his Puerto Rican wife Felicitas, who joined four Mexican American families to sue four Orange County school districts. The families challenged the common California practices of drawing school boundaries around majority-Mexican American neighborhoods and of placing Mexicans who lived in majority-white communities into segregated Spanish "remedial" schools.

During the trial, the Orange County superintendents justified school segregation because the Mexican American children had inferior "personal hygiene", "scholastic ability", and "economic outlook". On the plaintiff's side, the constitutionality of educational segregation was questioned on the basis of the Fourteenth Amendment, and social scientists were brought in as expert witnesses to dispute the supposed educational benefits of segregated schools. In 1946, Judge Paul McCormick ruled that school segregation was a "clear denial" of the Equal Protection Clause, and the next year, McCormick's decision was upheld by the U.S. Court of Appeals. The Méndez case was significant for several reasons, including: the support of NAACP counsel Thurgood Marshall; the plaintiffs' revolutionary use of social scientific research as a basis for law; the legal precedent marking educational segregation as unconstitutional; and the case's influence for the Anderson Bill (1947), which repealed California school segregation.

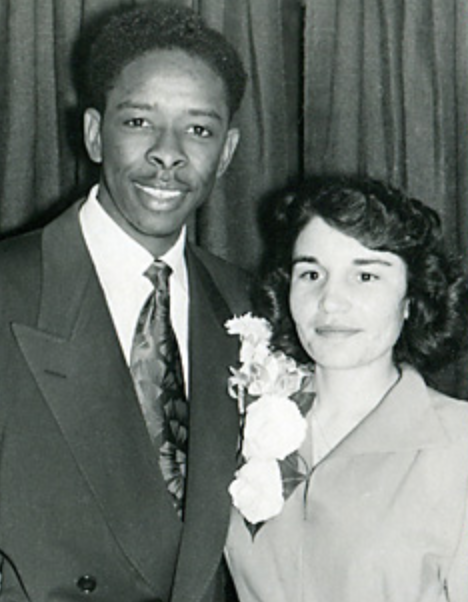
Leon Watson and Rosina Rodriquez, an interracial couple who were allowed to marry because of the Perez v. Sharp (1948) case

The second major civil rights court victory for Mexican Americans also occurred in California. Andrea Pérez, who was Mexican American, and Sylvester Davis, who was African American, had met and developed a friendship immediately before he was drafted to fight in World War II. When he returned, they resumed their relationship, fell in love, and married. At the time, California's anti-miscegenation code barred interracial marriage. Pérez and Davis hired the civil rights attorney Dan Marshall to represent them in challenging the ban. When the Los Angeles County clerk denied them a marriage license, Pérez formally filed suit. In 1948, the California Supreme Court ruled in favor of the couple, becoming the first state in the country to overturn a ban on interracial marriage. The decision in part relied on arguments based on the inability of the law to account for Mexican mestizaje. The court, noting Pérez' "in-between" racial status, ruled that blanket bans on interracial marriage were "too vague and uncertain" since they did not consider people who were of "mixed ancestry".

Also, the court held county clerks and other government employees could not realistically be expected to successfully ascertain the racial makeup of each marriage applicant. Finally, Judge Roger Traynor's majority opinion found that the law also violated the equal protection clause of the Fourteenth Amendment. Earl Warren was then the governor of California, and he oversaw the legal implementation of the ruling in the state. Nineteen years later, he served as chief justice in Loving v. Virginia (1967), the U.S. Supreme Court case that struck down all remaining state bans on interracial marriage.

== Mid-20th century ==
=== Korean War ===
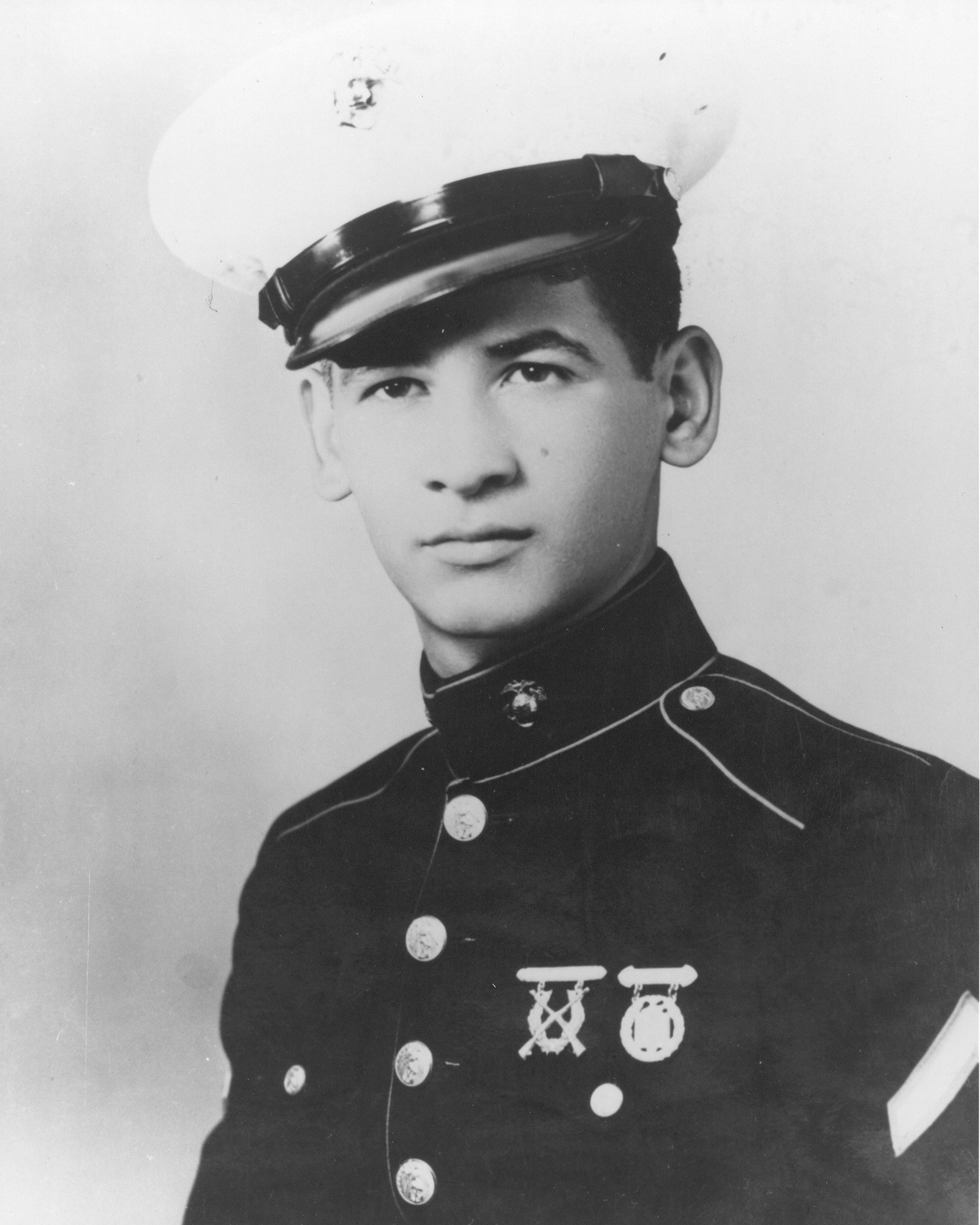
Private First Class Eugene A. Obregon, United States Marine Corps and posthumous Medal of Honor recipient

In June 1950, the United States entered the Korean War as part of a United Nations-led coalition supporting South Korea. Thousands of Mexican Americans served in the conflict from its beginning, many of them inspired to join the war effort because of the service of their fathers and older brothers in World War II. Staff Sgt. Joe Campos, from Miami, Arizona became one of the first soldiers missing in action of the war after his plane was shot down on June 28, 1950 over the Yellow Sea. A few days later, Florentino Gonzales, from Chicago, was part of the first group of prisoners of war. One Mexican American soldier, Jesus Rodriguez, later remembered how his harsh upbringing in the United States prepared him for the Korean War.

He stated, "I used to pray a lot. Another thing that helped me was that I was street smart from before going into the service. On the streets I learned how to fight ... Something else that helped me survive Korea was that going hungry wasn't new to me and didn't hurt me." Ten Mexican Americans were awarded the Medal of Honor for their valor in the Korean War; they included: Joe R. Baldonado, Victor H. Espinoza, Eduardo C. Gomez, Edward Gómez, Ambrosio Guillen, Rodolfo P. Hernandez, Benito Martinez, Eugene Arnold Obregon, Mike C. Pena, and Joseph C. Rodriguez. Finally, Gen. Richard E. Cavazos, born in Kingsville, Texas, became the first Mexican American four-star general and head of the U.S. Army Forces Command.

=== Bracero program ===
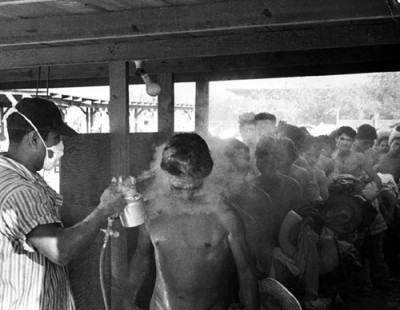
Bracero workers were subject to invasive medical examinations and harmful DDT sprays before they were allowed to enter the U.S.

In 1951, the U.S. government passed Public Law 78, a law which formalized the Bracero Program, a temporary work exchange program with Mexico. First begun as a scheme to fill wartime labor shortages during World War II, Congress decided to formalize the program for a number of reasons: first, new concerns were raised about domestic labor gaps during the Korean War; second, political concerns were raised about a potential rise in undocumented immigration if Mexican laborers were not offered a legal pathway to work in the U.S.; third, agricultural employers' associations lobbied hard for the program since they benefited the most from its subsidizations.

Estimates place the annual number of laborers entering the U.S. in the 1950s at around 300,000, and a significant number of these Braceros were indigenous Mexicans, who hardly spoke Spanish. Domestically, the program was controversial. The U.S. Department of Labor official overseeing the program called it "legalized slavery", and some Mexican Americans believed the program suppressed their own wages. Dolores Huerta, a prominent labor organizer, first began her work as an organizer with the Stockton Community Service Organization (CSO) in the 1950s, where she organized voter registration drives, and pressed for barrio improvements. She was a vehement opposer of the Bracero program and was a key actor lobbying for its termination.

=== Operation Wetback ===
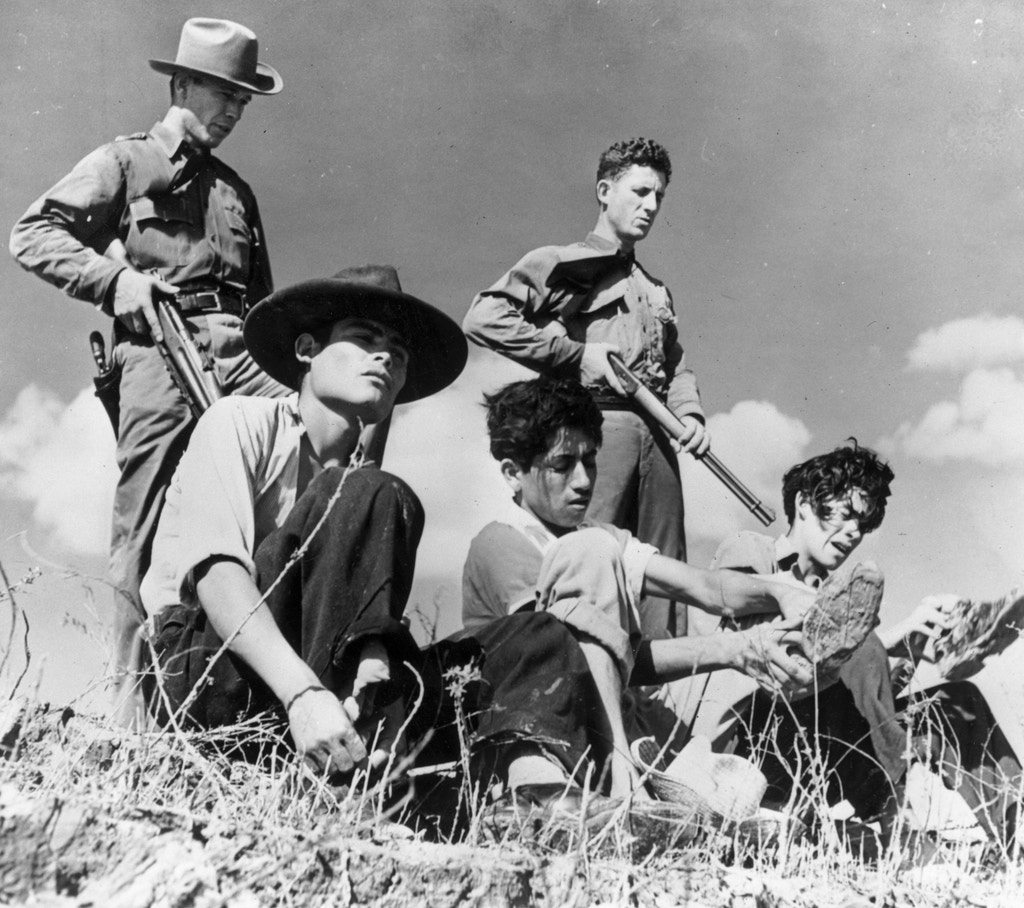
Border Patrol hold teenage Mexican immigrant boys at gunpoint in Texas

In 1951, the Truman administration's Commission on Migratory Labor released a scathing and xenophobic report blaming the Southwest's social ills on undocumented immigration. The report stated, "The magnitude [of undocumented migration] ... has reached entirely new levels in the past 7 years ... In its newly achieved proportions, it is virtually an invasion." This report, and an August 1953 tour of Southern California, influenced Attorney General Herbert Brownell, Jr. to push Congress to sanction the employers of undocumented workers. This did not become law. Nevertheless, the new Eisenhower administration moved forward with planning a mass deportation operation. On June 9, 1954, the INS Commissioner Joseph Swing announced Operation Wetback, a campaign to deport all undocumented people from the United States. Extensive media coverage during the period exaggerated the Border Patrol's menace and strength, and extensively reported displays of strength as part of a broader PR campaign against undocumented migration.

While 1.1 million INS apprehensions occurred that year, estimates place the number of deportations resulting directly from Operation Wetback at around 33,000 people, with perhaps another 60,000 who voluntarily repatriated. Mexican American organizations, such as LULAC and the American G.I. Forum - as well as the broader Mexican American middle-class – were largely supportive of the campaign surrounding Operation Wetback, believing that unauthorized Mexican immigration had "materially retarded" the acceptance and assimilation of Mexican Americans into American culture.

=== Law and politics ===
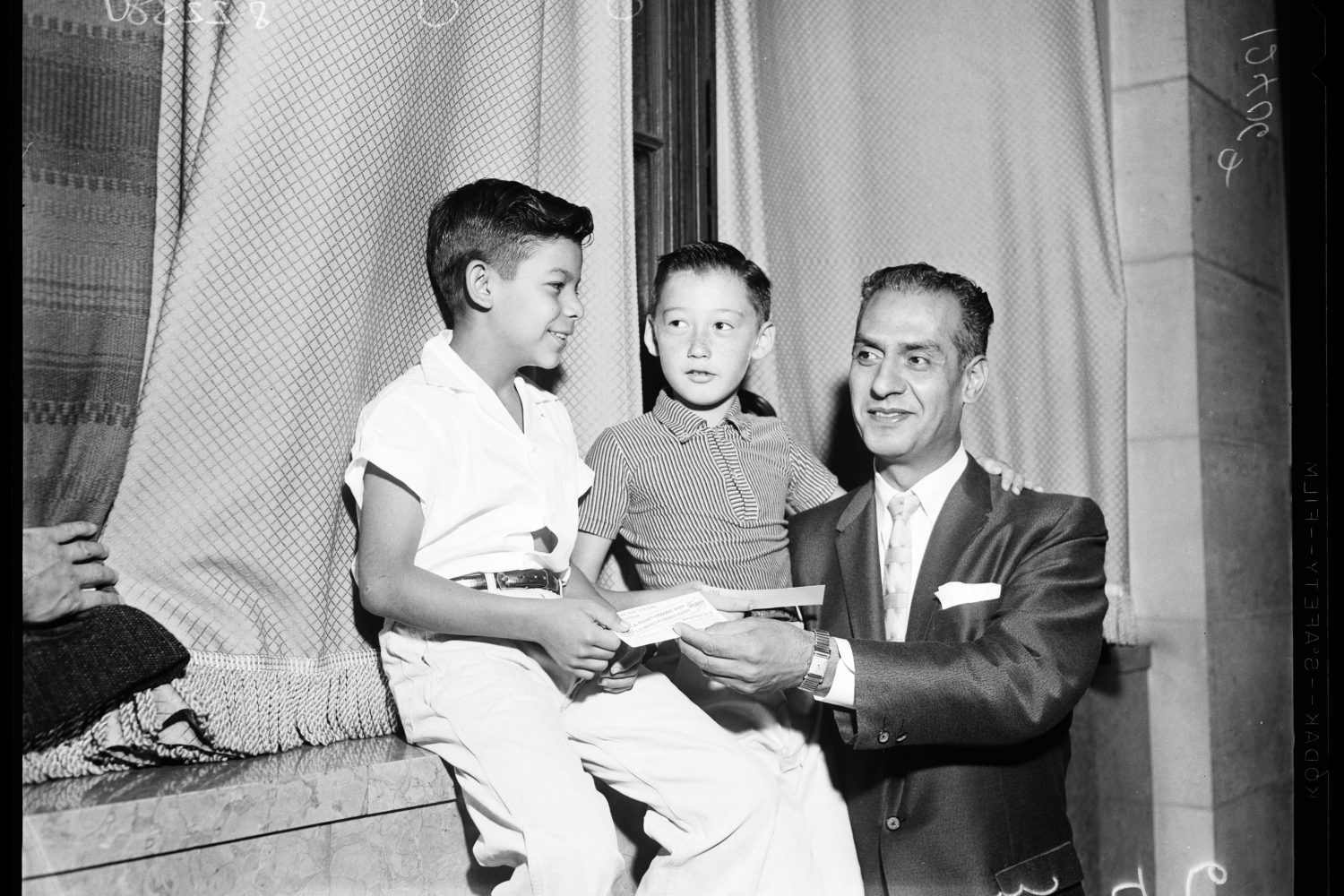
LA councilman Edward R. Roybal with two young boys

Electorally, Mexican Americans made small but important strides in the 1950s. In Los Angeles, Edward R. Roybal served as the only Mexican American member on the Los Angeles City Council. During his time on council, he took a series of important positions, including: fighting against an ordinance which required communists to register with the police; opposing the tearing down of the Mexican American neighborhood of Chavez Ravine to build Dodger Stadium; and pushing for the establishment of a Fair Employment Practices Commission for the city. In 1954, he also ran for Lieutenant Governor, but he lost to the incumbent Goodwin Knight (R) by more than ten points. Despite these gains in political visibility, however, Mexican American Angelenos also experienced several high-profile incidents of police brutality in the early 1950s, including Bloody Christmas.

In the courts, Mexican Americans continued to challenge the legal infrastructure of American segregation. Throughout the Southwest, Mexican Americans were often deliberately excluded from serving as jurors in cases involving Mexican American defendants. In 1954, Pete Hernandez, an agricultural worker, was convicted by an all-Anglo jury in Jackson County, Texas for murder. Hernandez's pro bono legal team, including Gustavo C. García, appealed the ruling, arguing that he was being discriminated against because there were no Mexicans in the jury that convicted him. They argued that Hernandez had the right to be tried by a jury of his peers under the 14th Amendment. The State of Texas denied their claim, but they appealed to the United States Supreme Court through a writ of certiorari.

The legal team included García, Carlos Cadena and John J. Herrera of the League of United Latin American Citizens, and James DeAnda and Cris Alderete of the G. I. Forum, both activist groups for civil rights for Mexican Americans. These were the first Mexican-American lawyers to represent a defendant before the U.S. Supreme Court, which heard their arguments on January 11, 1954. Chief Justice Earl Warren and the Supreme Court unanimously ruled in favor of Hernandez, and required he be retried by a jury composed of his peers.

== Chicano Movement ==
=== 1960s ===
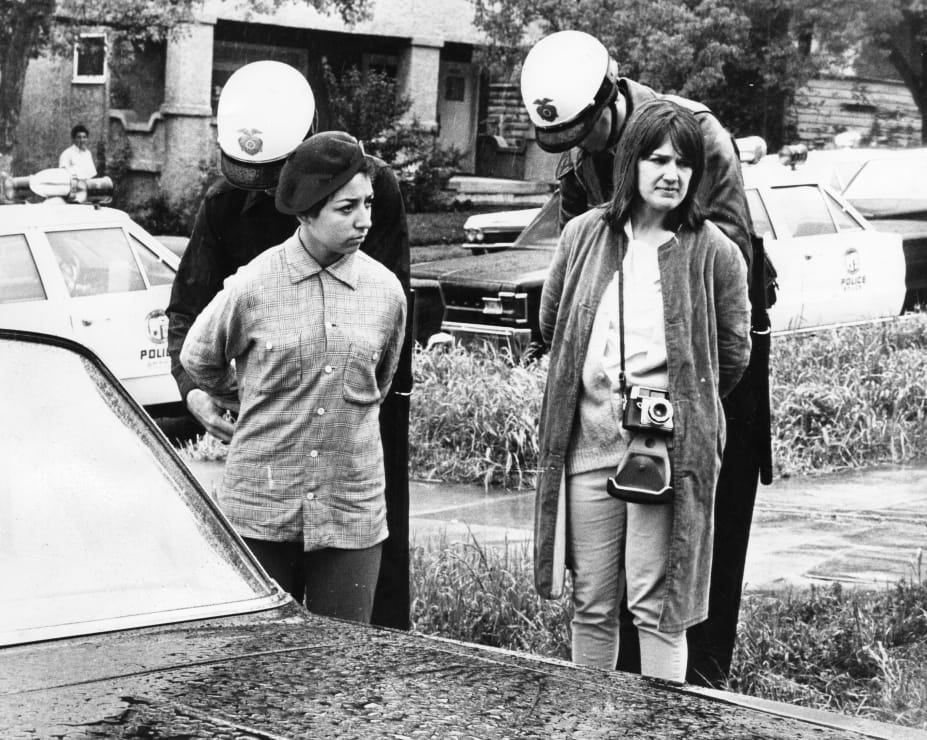
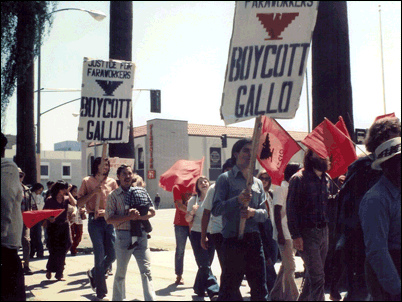
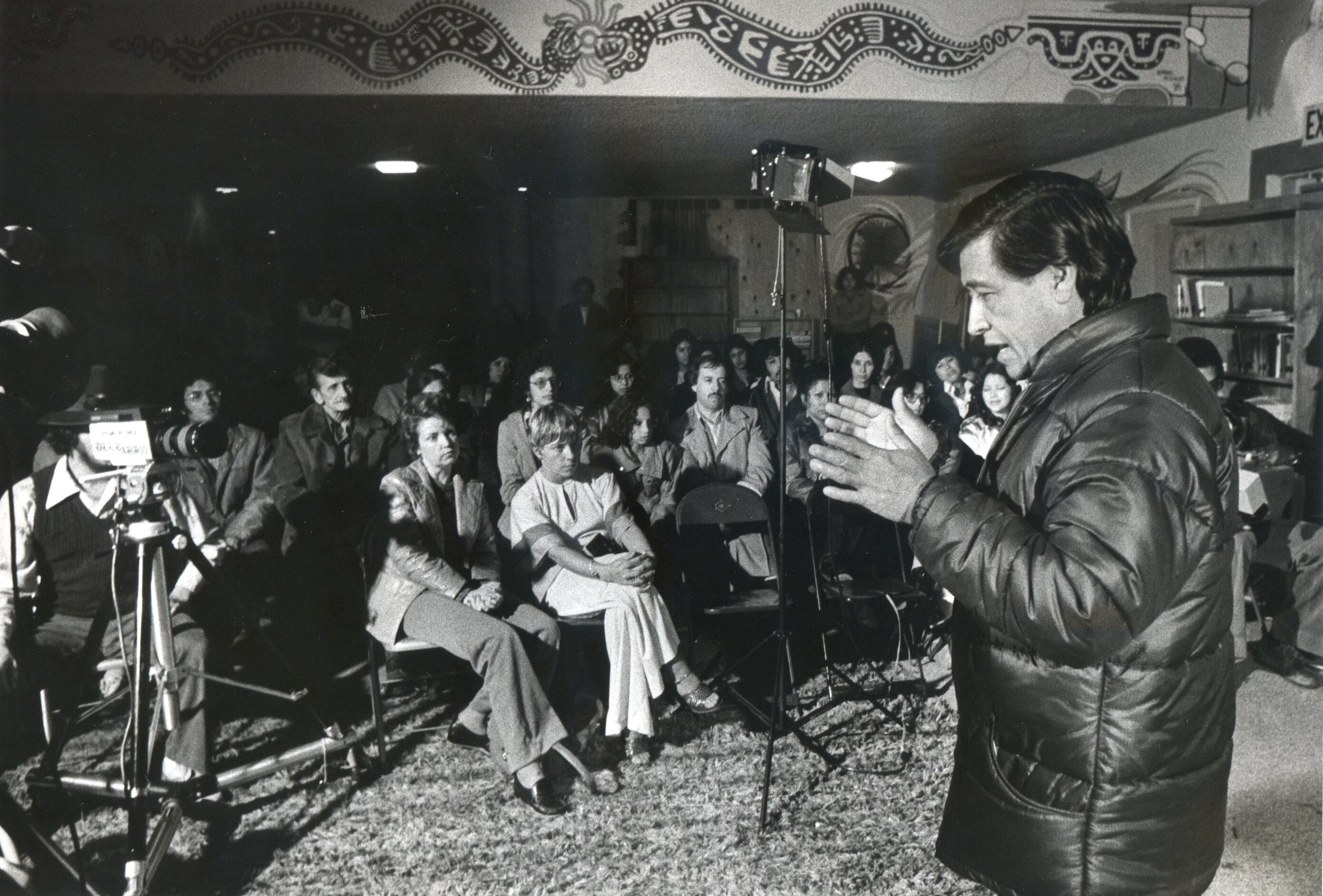
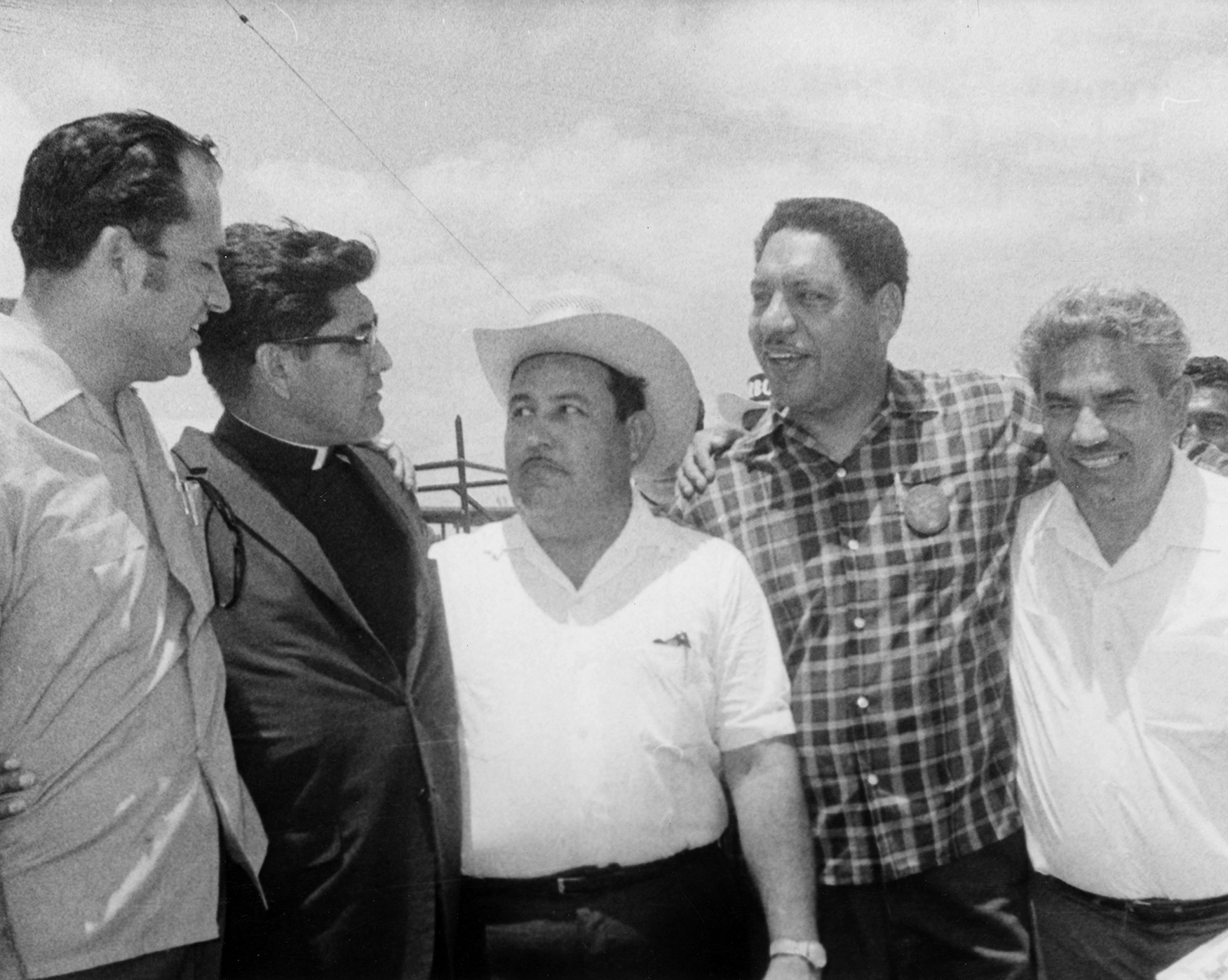
The Chicano Movement, also referred to as El Movimiento, was a social and political movement during the Civil Rights Movement. It was inspired by prior acts of resistance of Mexican Americans, perhaps most directly the Pachucos of the 1940s and 1950s.

In the 1960s, a sub-group of Mexican American student organizations developed ideologies of Chicano nationalism and the Chicano movement, highlighting American discrimination against Mexican Americans and emphasizing the overarching failures of a culturally pluralistic society. Calling themselves La Raza, Chicano activists sought to affirm Mexican Americans' racial distinctiveness and working-class status, create a pro-barrio movement, and assert that "brown is beautiful." Urging against both ethnic assimilation and the mistreatment of low-wage workers, the Chicano Movement was the first large-scale mobilization of Mexican American activism in United States history.

The Chicano movement blossomed in the 1960s. The movement had roots in the civil rights struggles that had preceded it, adding to it the cultural and generational politics of the era.

In 1963, in Crystal City, Texas the mainly Mexican-American migrant community together with the support of the Teamsters Union and the Political Association of Spanish-Speaking Organizations (PASSO), an outgrowth of the Viva Kennedy clubs of 1960, encouraged Mexican-American men and women to pay their poll tax and choose their own candidates. Led by Teamsters business agent and cannery employee, Juan Cornejo, five Mexican-Americans, despite intimidation by the Texas Rangers, won the support of their community young and old alike who thanks to the protection provided by the Teamsters and PASSO mobilized for electoral victory. This "revolt" was covered nationwide and reported in the New York Times and the Wall Street Journal. This election led Americans outside of the Southwest to take note of America's other minority community as a political force.

The early proponents of the movement — Rodolfo Gonzales in Denver, Colorado and Reies Tijerina in New Mexico — adopted a historical account of the preceding hundred and twenty-five years that obscured much of Mexican-American history. Gonzales and Tijerina embraced a form of nationalism that was based on the failure of the United States government to live up to the promises that it had made in the Treaty of Guadalupe Hidalgo.

The Immigration and Nationality Act of 1965 set strict quotas on the number of persons who could legally enter the U.S. from Latin American nations, and most new Mexican migration to the U.S. in the 1960s was temporary and short-term. Seasonal migration between the United States and Mexico became illegal in 1965. Nevertheless, the numbers involved with seasonal agriculture kept growing, often forced to resort to undocumented migration. They made money in the U.S. but returned to the villages to spend it, tend to the family business, and participate in extended kinship rituals such as baptisms, weddings, and funerals.

The most significant union struggle involving Mexican-Americans was the United Farm Workers' long strike and boycott aimed at grape growers in the San Joaquin and Coachella Valleys in the late 1960s, followed by campaigns to organize lettuce workers in California and Arizona, farm workers in Texas, and orange grove workers in Florida.

The most prominent civil rights organization in the Mexican-American community is the Mexican American Legal Defense and Educational Fund (MALDEF), founded in 1968. Although modeled after the NAACP Legal Defense and Educational Fund, MALDEF has also taken on many of the functions of other organizations, including political advocacy and training of local leaders.

Instead, when the movement dealt with practical problems most activists focused on the most immediate issues confronting Mexican-Americans: unequal educational and employment opportunities, political disenfranchisement, and police brutality. In the heady days of the late 1960s, when the student movement was active around the globe, the Chicano movement brought about more or less spontaneous actions, such as the mass walkouts by high school students in Denver and East Los Angeles in 1968.

The movement was particularly strong at the college level, where activists formed MEChA, el Movimiento Estudiantil Chicano de Aztlán, which promoted Chicano Studies programs and a generalized nationalist agenda. The student movement produced a generation of future political leaders, including Richard Alatorre and Cruz Bustamante in California.

=== 1970s ===
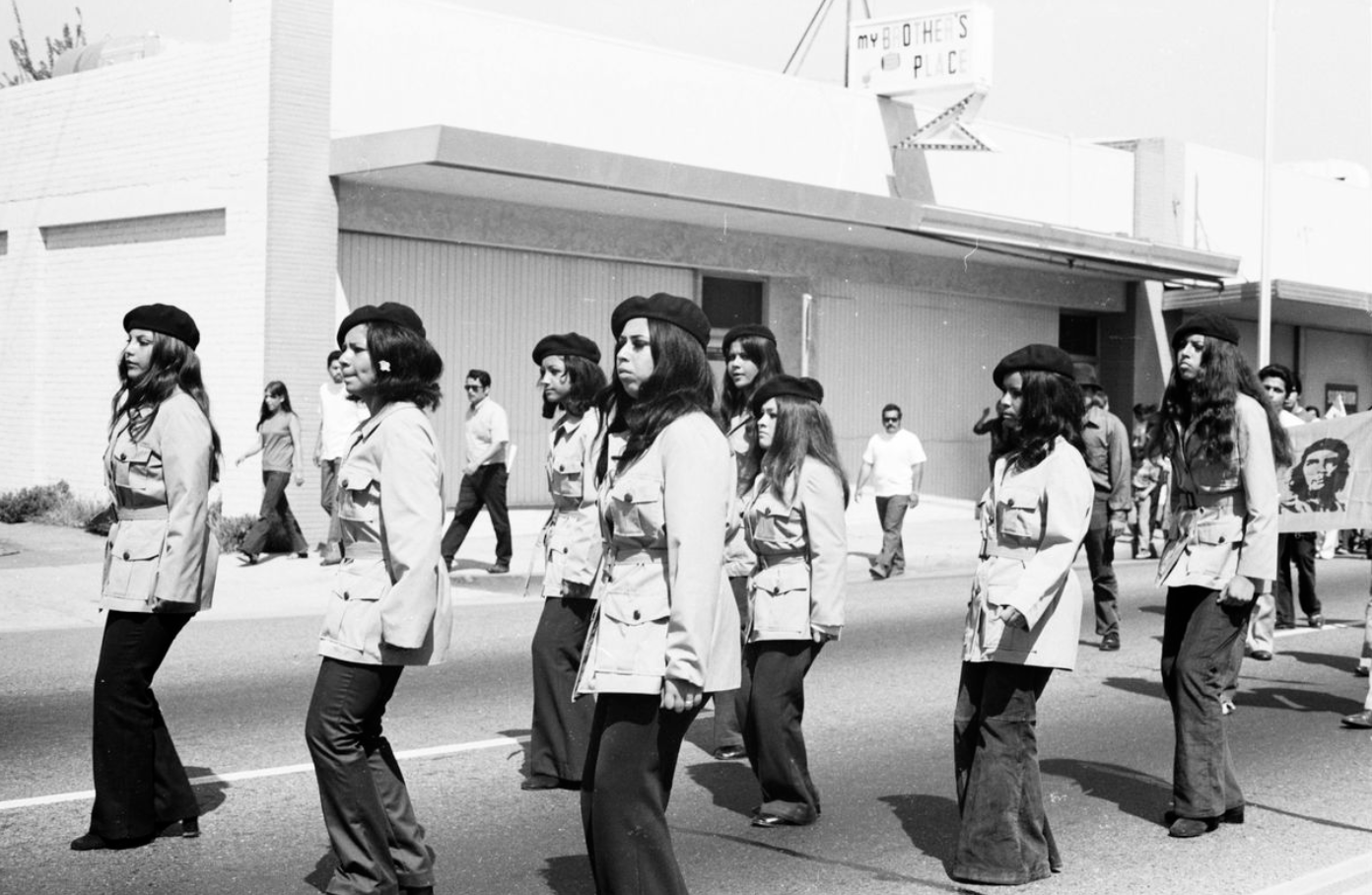
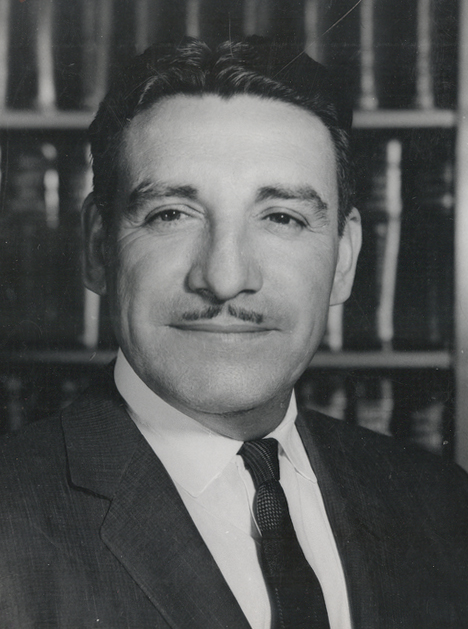
Top: The Brown Berets, a pro-Chicano organization which revolved around farm worker's struggles, educational reform, and anti-war activism.
Bottom: Raúl Héctor Castro, the Governor of Arizona from 1975-1977.

Some women who worked within the Chicano movement felt that participants were more worried about other issues, such as immigration than solving problems that affected women. This led Chicanas to form the Comisión Femenil Mexicana Nacional in 1970. The National Chicano Moratorium March was also held in Los Angeles in 1970.

La Raza Unida Party campaigns in the early 1970s had the practical effect of defeating Mexican-American Democratic candidates, embittering many activists against the party and the form of nationalism it represented.

As a result of the Voting Rights Act, followed up by intensive political organizing, Mexican-Americans were able to achieve a new degree of political power and representation in Texas and elsewhere in the Southwest. The La Raza Unida Party, headed by José Ángel Gutiérrez of Crystal City, Texas made startling progress in the poorest regions in the Rio Grande Valley with its base of operations at Crystal City, Texas in the early 1970s, spreading for a while to Colorado, Wisconsin, California, Michigan, Oregon, Kansas, Illinois and several other states. The party faded in the mid-1970s and held on only in Crystal City, Texas before collapsing in the early 1980s. Veterans from the party, such as Willie Velasquez, became active in Democratic politics and in organizing projects such as the Southwest Voter Registration Education Project, which boosted the electoral fortunes of Mexican-American candidates throughout the Southwest.

While the UFW suffered severe setbacks in California in 1973 and never established a strong union presence in other states, its struggle propelled César Chávez and Dolores Huerta into national prominence, while providing the foot soldiers who helped increase the visibility of Mexican-Americans within the Democratic Party in California and elect a number of Mexican-American candidates in the 1970s and 1980s.

By the late 1970s, tactics had forced growers to recognize the UFW as the bargaining agent for 50,000 field workers in California and Florida.

== Reagan era ==
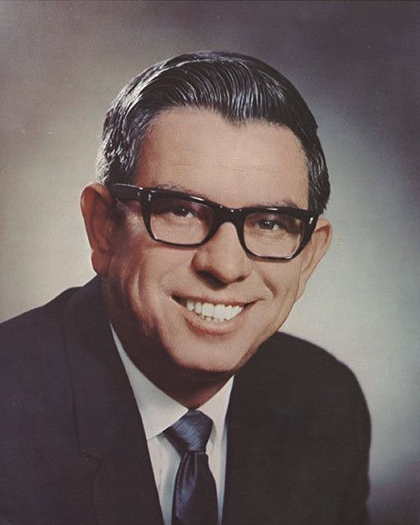
Manuel Lujan Jr. the United States Secretary of the Interior from 1989 to 1993

Since the 1980s, Mexican migration has increased dramatically. The Immigration Reform and Control Act of 1986 granted amnesty to illegal immigrants who had resided in the U.S. before 1982 while imposing penalties on employers who hired illegal immigrants. Several factors led to an increase in Mexican immigration to the U.S. The Latin American debt crisis of the 1980s led to high rates of unemployment in Mexico and destroyed the savings of a large portion of the middle-class.

In the 1980s, the first Mexican-American was elected to the Los Angeles City Council in over twenty years. A landmark lawsuit was also filed by the American Civil Liberties Union and the Mexican American Legal Defense and Educational Fund, which argued "the Los Angeles Supervisors in 1981 adopted a plan that fragmented the Latino population into three districts, thus dividing their political power." The outcome of this litigation permitted a Mexican-American to win election to the Los Angeles County Board of Supervisors, the first Mexican American to join that body in more than a century. Ben Fernandez an American politician, financial consultant and special ambassador ran for President of the United States three times, seriously in 1980 and with more perfunctory campaigns in 1984 and 1988, making him America's first major-party presidential contender of Latin American origin. Fernandez was born in Kansas to Mexican parents who were illegal immigrants. At the same time and for similar reasons, neoliberal politician like Henry Cisneros, the mayor of San Antonio, Texas who was a serious contender for the 1984 Democratic Party vice-presidential nomination; Federico Pena the mayor of Denver, Colorado; and Toney Anaya, former governor of New Mexico, emerged as the new voices of Mexican Americans political leadership.

== 1990s ==
=== National politics ===
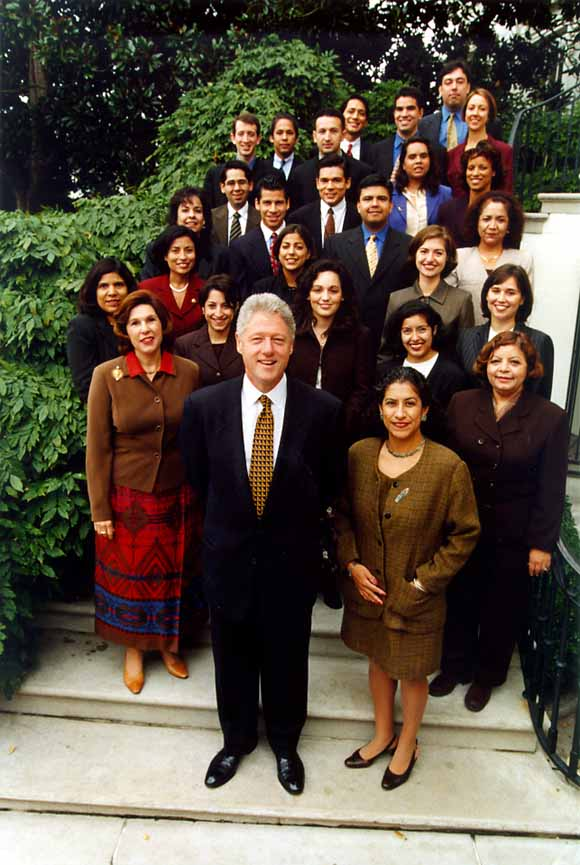
President Clinton with his Latino political appointees

In the final two years of the Bush administration, Congress made several important adjustments to U.S. immigration law. The Immigration Act of 1990 made marrying to evade immigration laws, voting in federal elections as a non-citizen, and "falsely claiming citizenship" to attain employment criminal violations which would lead to incarceration and deportation. The bill also created the temporary protected status (TPS visa), lifted the English testing process for naturalization for permanent residents over 55, and eliminated exclusion of homosexuals as "sexual deviants".

During the Clinton administration, several cabinet-level Mexican Americans served under President Bill Clinton. These included Henry Cisneros (Department of Housing and Urban Development), Federico Peña (Department of Transportation and Department of Energy), and Bill Richardson (U.S. Ambassador to the United Nations and Department of Energy). Clinton was widely praised for his overall cabinet selections, which were significantly more diverse than prior administrations.

During his presidency, however, Clinton's legacy with both Mexico and the Mexican American community was more mixed. His passage of the 1994 Crime Bill is recognized as disproportionately targeting and incarcerating young Mexican American and African American men. Further, his policy of pushing Washington Consensus policies on Mexico led to the 1994 Mexican Peso Crisis, which decimated the Mexican working class and increased migration to the United States. Finally, his signing of the NAFTA is recognized for its harmful effect on both nation's working classes, and the expansion of maquiladoras in states like Baja California, Chihuahua, and Coahuila.

=== Gang culture ===
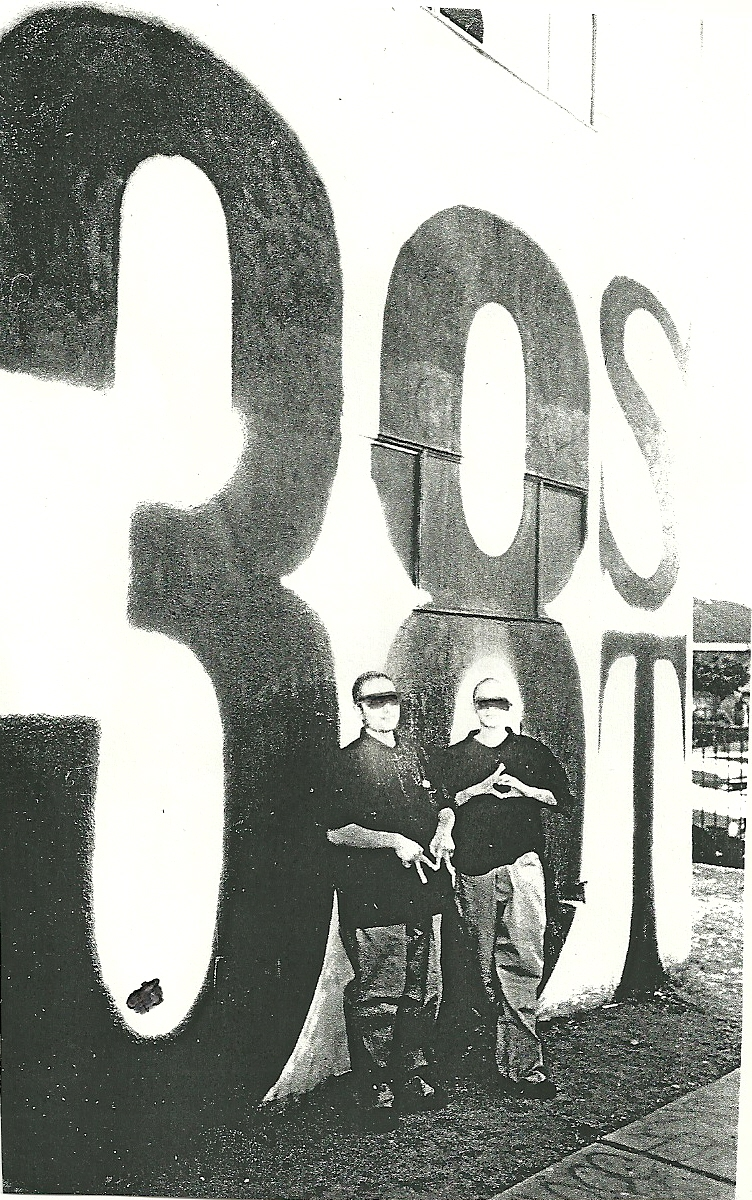
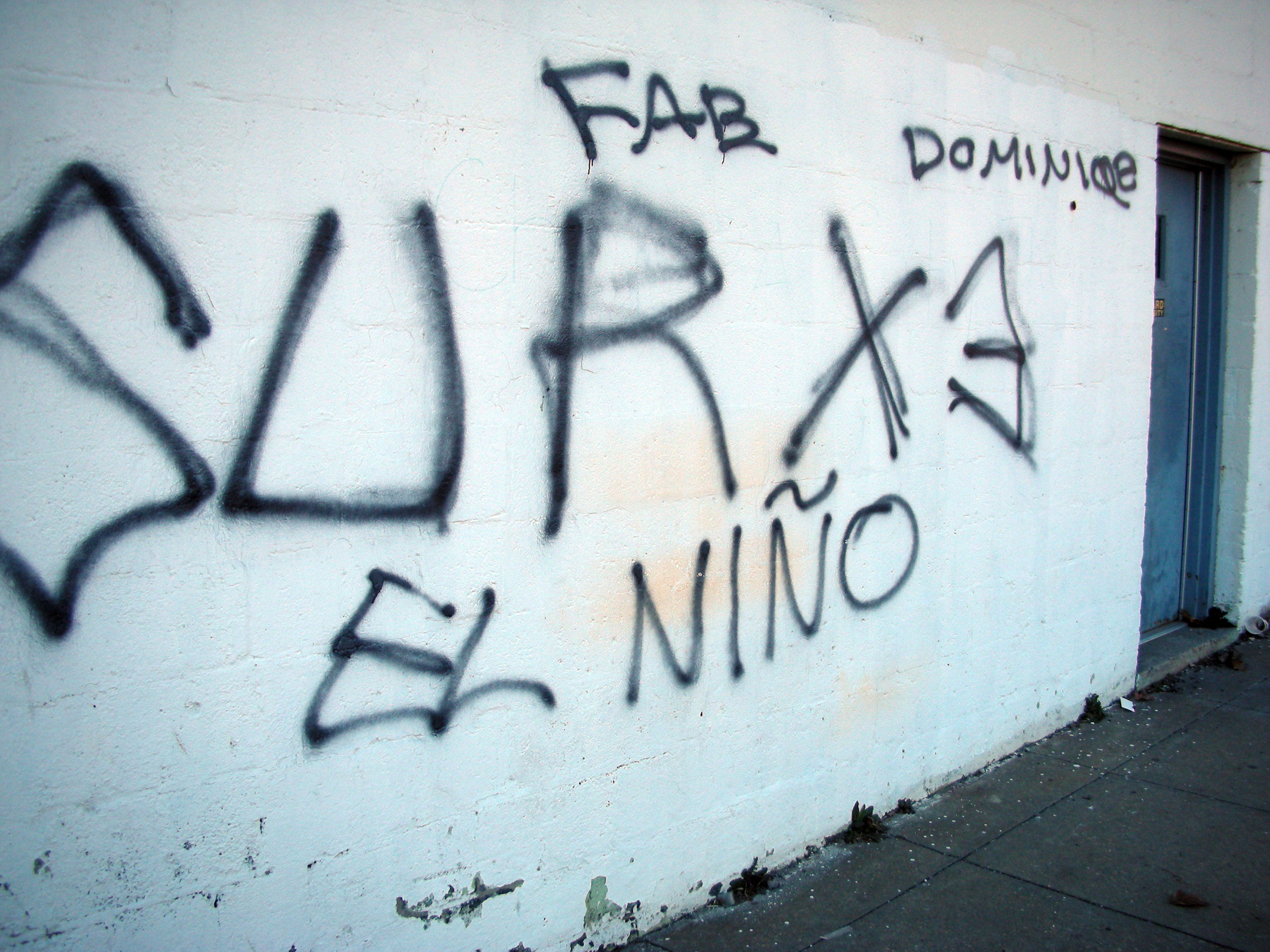
The 1990s saw an explosion of Chicano gang activity in cities such as Los Angeles, San Antonio, and Chicago.

In the 1990s, Chicano youth gang involvement continued to rise across the country, as the result of both the expansion of cocaine markets and widespread socioeconomic changes in the United States. Manufacturing jobs had been decreasing across the U.S. for over twenty years, and as the American economy turned increasingly turned toward the technological and service industries, unemployment rates among young men of color soared in urban areas.

Unable to find work in this changing economy, drug markets became the only source of survival for these displaced workers, as the rising prices for crack cocaine became a way for desperate youth to make money. Over time, however, drug markets were monopolized by organized gangs, which actively recruited increasingly younger African American and Chicano youth. Traditional American pathways away from a "gangster lifestyle", such as marriage, family, and stable employment, were largely unavailable to these youth, and in many black, Chicano, and immigrant communities, gang influence emerged as "a dominant informal control and socialization force".

Chicano youth gang activity in the 1990s rose notably in Los Angeles and Chicago, two of the cities with the nation's highest numbers of Mexican Americans, but gang activity rose in almost every U.S. city, including throughout Texas. The political response to gangs such as the Mexican Mafia and 38th Street was a dramatic escalation of the Reagan administration's war on drugs. Racialized fears of black and brown "superpredators" resulted in tough-on-crime policies in the 1990s, culminating in the infamous Violent Crime Control and Law Enforcement Act of 1994. The law provided local funding to hire over 100,000 new police officers; created grant programs to incentivize drug-related arrests; gave states funds to build massive new prison facilities; and disproportionately criminalized crack cocaine over cocaine. Some have argued this bill led directly to the U.S.' rise of mass incarceration.

The ramifications of police militarization were extremely severe, particularly in cities like Los Angeles. In the late-80s, LAPD had responded to gang violence with a series of extremely violent community raids, including Operation Hammer, which was organized under the Community Resources Against Street Hoodlums (CRASH). In the 1990s, as many as 2,000 people a year were killed in Los Angeles County due to gang violence. In September 1993, a mass meeting in Elysian Park organized by La Eme was called to put an end to "violence between Mexicans", however such truces were not usually long-lasting. So, after the passage of the 1994 Crime Bill, the LAPD responded by ramping up its anti-gang tactics, including home and apartment raids, street sweeps, and civil gang injunctions.

=== Union campaigns ===
In the late 1980s and early 1990s, the Service Employees International Union (SEIU) initiated a series of "Justice for Janitors" campaigns to unionize U.S. janitors. At a march in Los Angeles on June 15, 1990, the striking janitors – many of whom were undocumented Mexican and Central American immigrants – were attacked by the Los Angeles Police Department. The police at first claimed they were acting in "self defense", but TV news footage aired later showed the police violently beating unarmed and peaceful strikers. 60 strikers were jailed, 38 were hospitalized, and two women miscarried. One striker told reporters, "What they did to us today in front of the TV cameras is the way the police treat us every day", and another woman stated, "I wasn't robbing a bank or selling drugs, I'm simply asking for an increase in pay, but the police beat us as if we were garbage."

Public outrage followed coverage of the event, and the janitors won the union, which doubled their pay and earned them benefits. The strike also inspired janitors in other parts of the country, including Houston, where jailed strikers were held on $20 million dollar bail for "civil disobedience". Outrage over the incident in Houston was global, with workers across the U.S. striking in support, and allies in Europe occupying buildings in protest. The Houston strike was successful, and pushed pension fund trustees to develop "responsible contractor" procedures. The 2000 film Bread and Roses was based on the Los Angeles campaign. In the mid-90s, the Industrial Workers of the World (IWW) also sought to organize Mexican workers, including troqueros and taxi drivers in LA.

=== 1992 Los Angeles riots ===
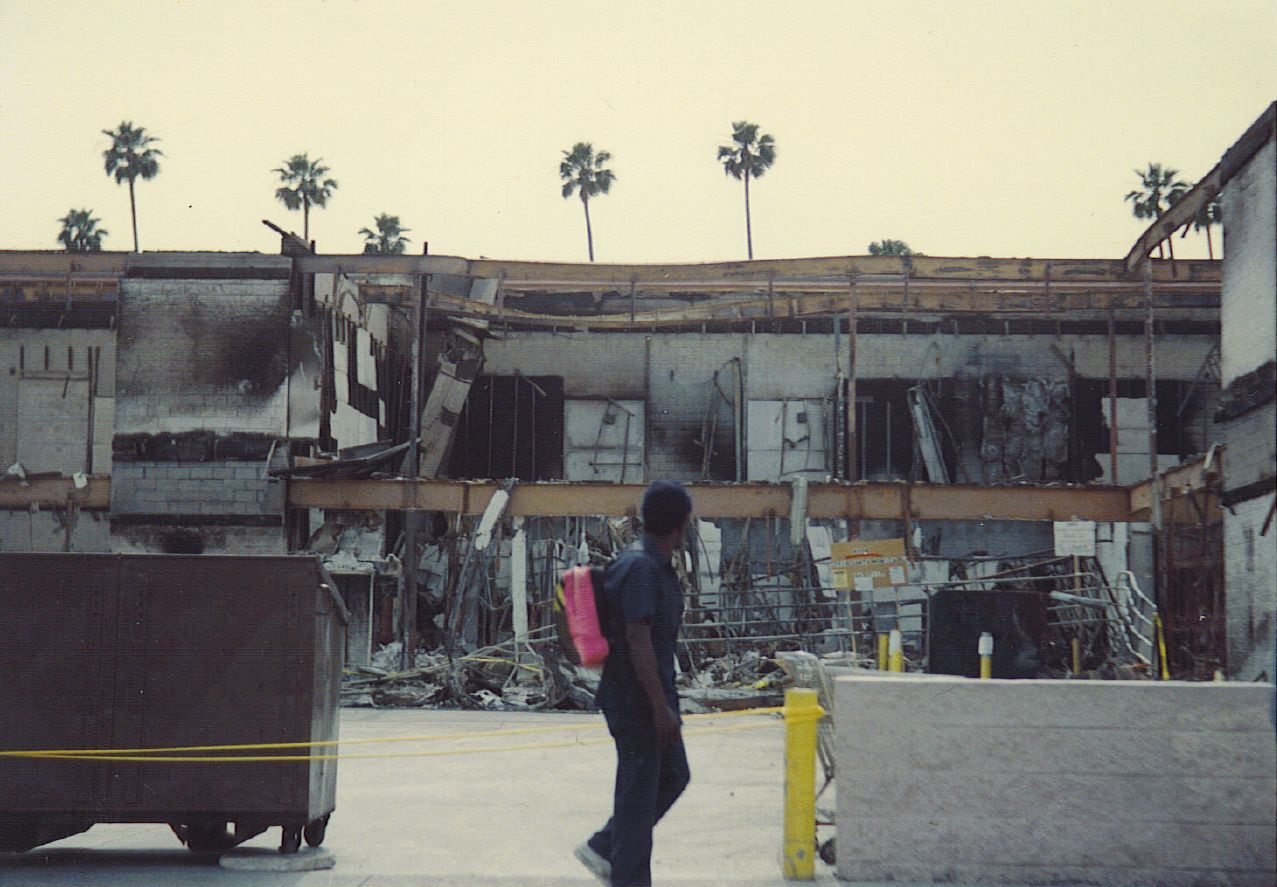
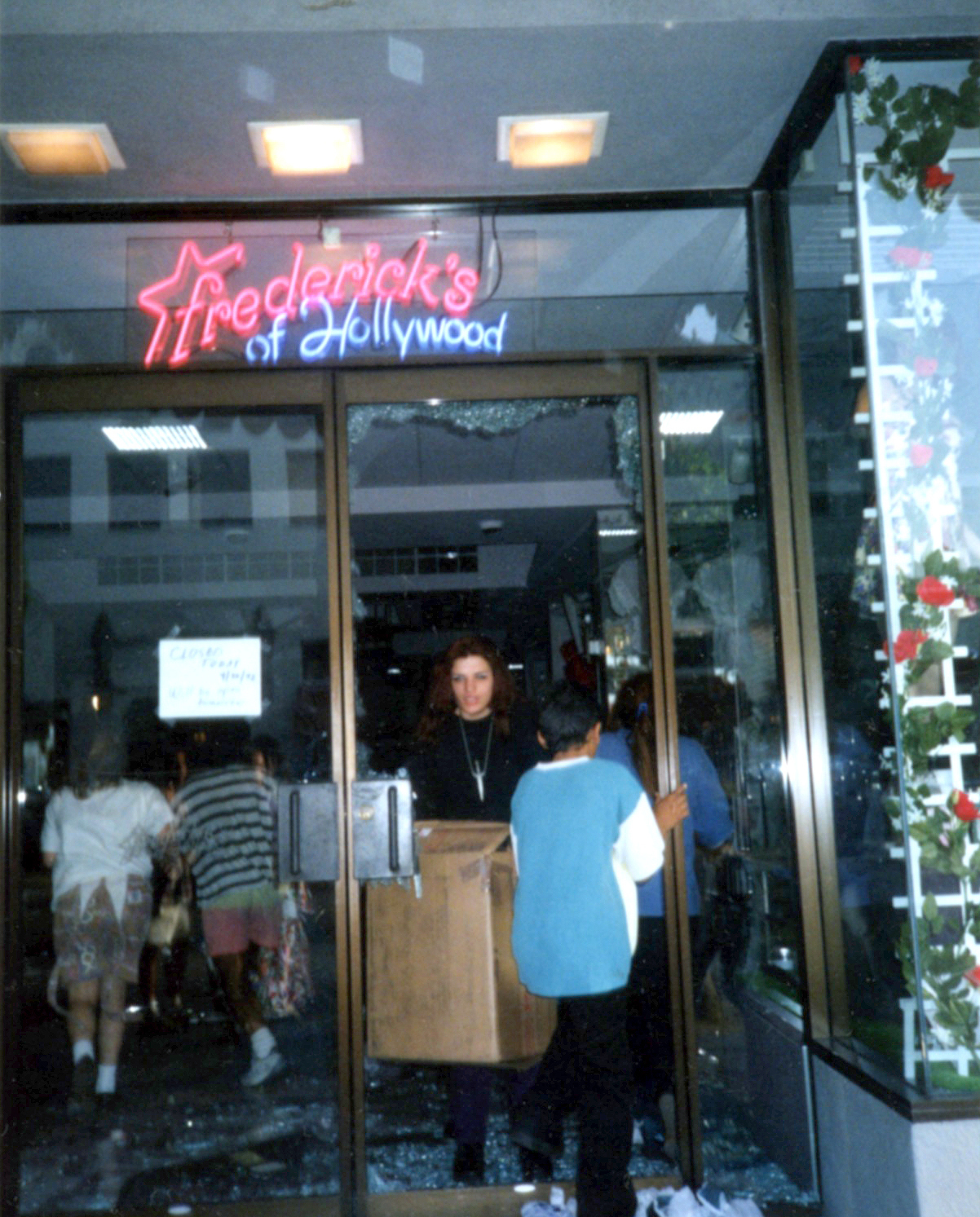
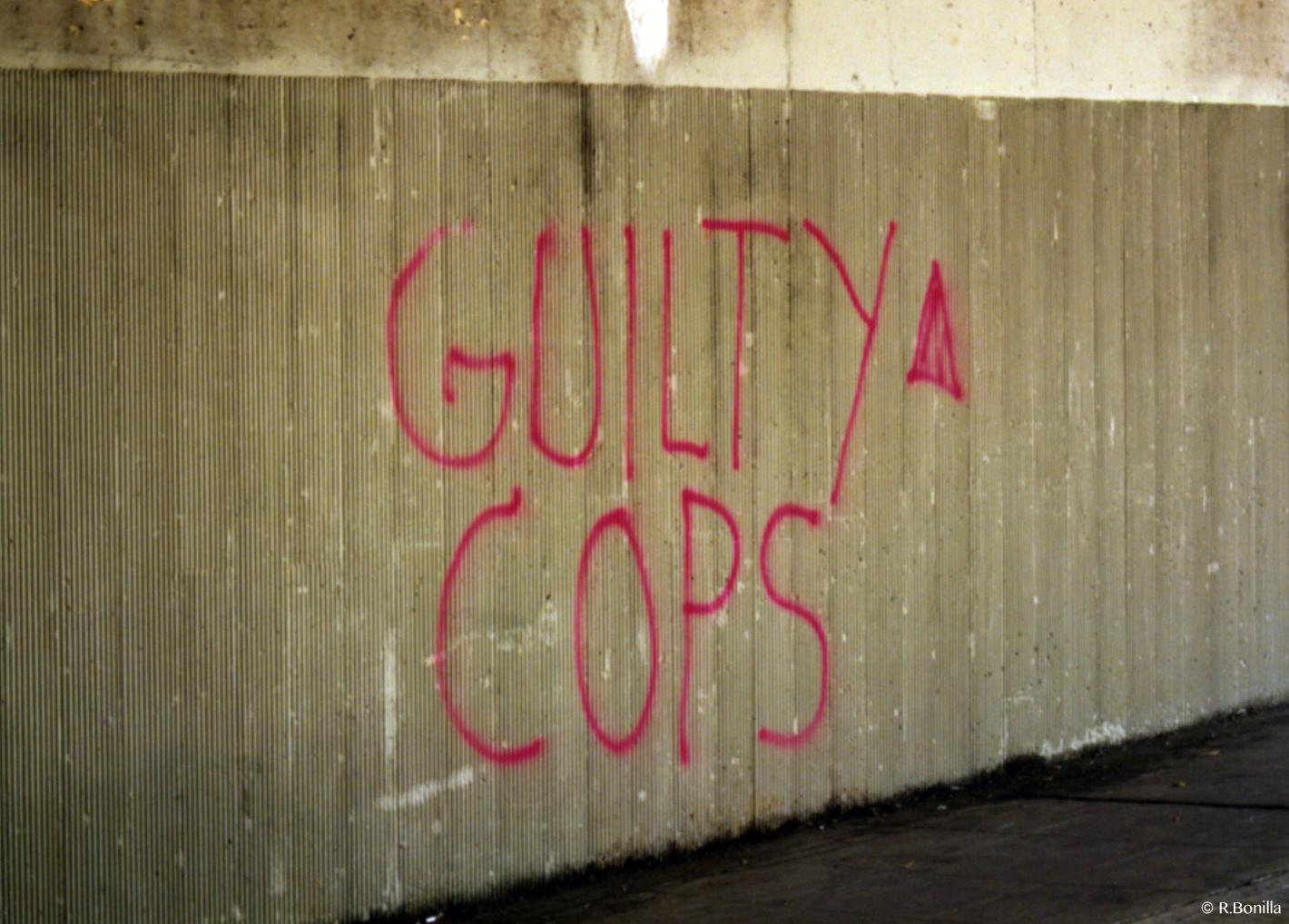
51% of people arrested during the 1992 Los Angeles uprising were Latino. Many of them were Mexican and Central American immigrants living in South Los Angeles.

Riots happened in Los Angeles County in April and May 1992. They began in South Central Los Angeles on April 29, after a trial jury acquitted four officers of the Los Angeles Police Department (LAPD) for usage of excessive force in the arrest and beating of Rodney King, which had been videotaped and widely viewed in TV broadcasts. Though much of the media coverage surrounding the events focused on constructing either a "black vs. white" or a "black vs. Asian" narrative (due to the tensions caused by the murder of Latasha Harlins), the majority of people arrested during the uprising were Latino. Analysis of charges in the riot's peak days showed 51% of defendants were Latino and 36% were black, and, of the 58 total people killed during the riots, more than one-third were Latino. Stanford University professor Joan Petersilia stated about the uprising, "This was clearly not a black riot. It was a minority riot."

The majority of the Latino residents of South Central Los Angeles in the early 1990s were recent Mexican immigrants and Central Americans. As a result, when the city's Latino leadership met during the uprising to discuss resolution strategies, the disconnect between LA's Mexican-American establishment and South LA's recent migrant community was more fully understood. Los Angeles County's only Latino supervisor, Gloria Molina, told The New York Times that in the days when Los Angeles was burning, she received multiple calls from Mexican American constituents urging her to denounce South Central's Mexican population. Molina stated, "They would say, 'Well, Gloria, it wasn't us doing the looting and the burning. It was those immigrants.'" Molina went further and stated, "They wanted me to denounce them. But I say, let's not let that divide us."

Even white journalists, such as the Los Angeles Times reporter Jack Miles, noted the tension between the South and East LA Latino communities. He wrote, the "law-abiding Mexican-American community" of East Los Angeles resented being associated with the Latinos of South Los Angeles, and that the incident marked the beginning of a Mexican American "anti-immigrant stance". In the years after the uprising, some journalists focused on the long-term interracial scars left by the racial uprising, while others focused on the multiple intra-ethnic meanings the uprising held for Latino communities in Los Angeles. Historians have also explained some of the reasons why there was so much Latino participation, including: the brutality that Latinos also experienced from the LAPD; the near-constant threat of deportation; and the neoliberal defunding of inner-city municipal services.

=== Proposition 187 ===
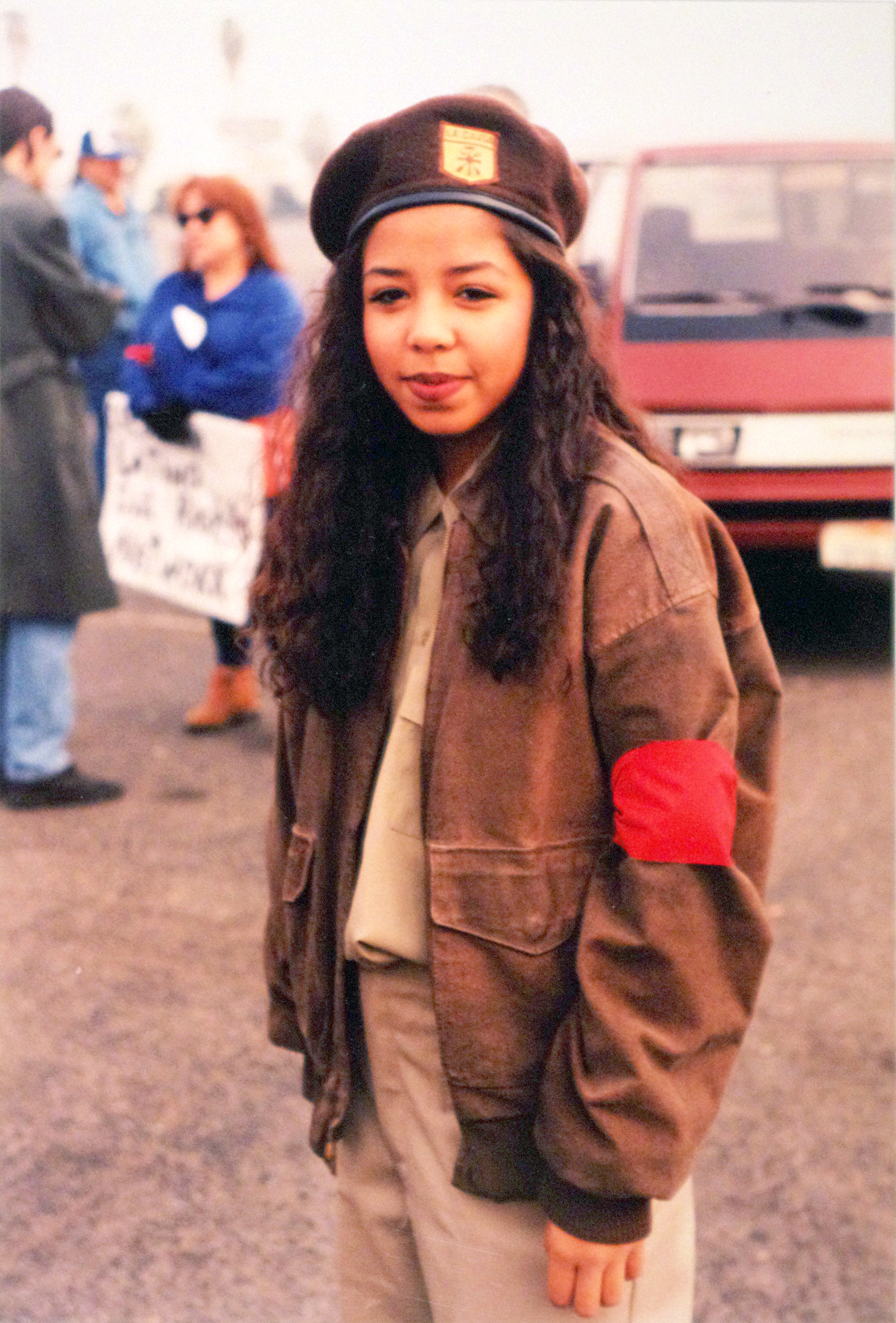
A young member of the Brown Berets at a Fresno march for the "No on Proposition 187" campaign.

Proposition 187 (also known as the Save Our State (SOS) initiative) was a 1994 ballot initiative to establish a state-run citizenship screening system and prohibit undocumented immigrants from using non-emergency health care, public schooling, and other services in the State of California. The bill was widely opposed by the state's Latino communities, though some Mexican Americans did express support for the measure. In the lead-up to the November vote, there were widespread "No on 187" protests throughout California, as activists urged that a full denial of basic rights to undocumented people would be detrimental to the state. In October 1994, an estimated seventy thousand people marched in Los Angeles to protest Prop. 187 in one of the largest protests in U.S. history.

The political atmosphere in California at the time, however, was extremely xenophobic, and coverage of the protest focused on the large number of Latino, Mexican, and Mexican American participants and especially expressed outrage at the presence of Mexican flags at the protest. Proposition 187 passed with 58% of the vote. Shortly after the proposition's passage, U.S. District Court Judge Mariana R. Pfaelzer in Los Angeles ruled that preventing undocumented children from attending K-12 schools was unconstitutional and prevented the implementation of most of the measure's other provisions. Proposition 187, though overturned, significantly eroded Mexican American and Latino support for the California Republican Party. In many ways, however, its basic tenets shaped the future of American debates regarding the rights of undocumented people in the U.S.

Culturally, the measure also had a strong impact on the community. In Selenidad (2009), the poet Deborah Paredez connected the collective trauma of the 1995 death of Selena to the community's response to the measure's initial passage, writing, "Selena's death galvanized Latino efforts to publicly mourn collective tragedies (such as approved anti-Latino legislation in California, Proposition 187 and Proposition 229) and to envision a brighter future."

== Early 2000s ==
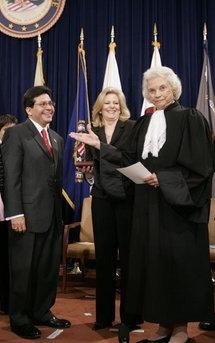
Justice Sandra Day O'Connor presents Alberto Gonzales to the audience after swearing him in as Attorney General, as Mrs. Gonzales looks on.

The foreign-born population of the U.S. increased by 11.3 million people in the 1990s, and Mexican immigrants accounted for 43% of that growth. The region with the fastest-growing immigrant population was the Southeast, where many Mexicans who found work in construction, agriculture, textile mills, and chicken processing plants. The Latino populations of Georgia, North and South Carolina, and Arkansas increased by 300% to 400% in the 1990s.

A major focus of Chicano activists in the 21st century has been to advance the representation of Chicanos in all American mainstream media. Criticism of the American mainstream news media and U.S. educational institutions by Chicano activists has been particularly harsh in recent years subsequent to the massive displays of support for immigrant rights such as that seen during La Gran Marcha ("The Great March") on March 25, 2006 in Los Angeles. As of today, this self-proclaimed "largest march in U.S. history" which was primarily organized by Mexican American organizations, Chicano activists, and fueled through a large network of active Internet users, L.A. Spanish language television, and Spanish language news radio coverage, is still virtually ignored by American mainstream (English language) news media and all textbooks of the American educational system.

After the increased border security following 9/11 in 2001, the back-and-forth pattern became dangerous. Many people kept coming north, but stayed in the U.S., and sent money home every month. Locked into the American economy year-round, millions of these undocumented workers moved out of season agricultural jobs into year-round jobs in restaurants, hotels, construction, landscaping and semiskilled factory work, such as meatpacking. Most paid federal social security taxes into imaginary accounts (and thus were not eligible for benefits.) Few had high enough incomes to pay federal or state income taxes, but all paid local and state sales taxes on their purchases as well as local property taxes (via their rent payments to landlords). By 2007 there were 12 million or so undocumented workers in the U.S.

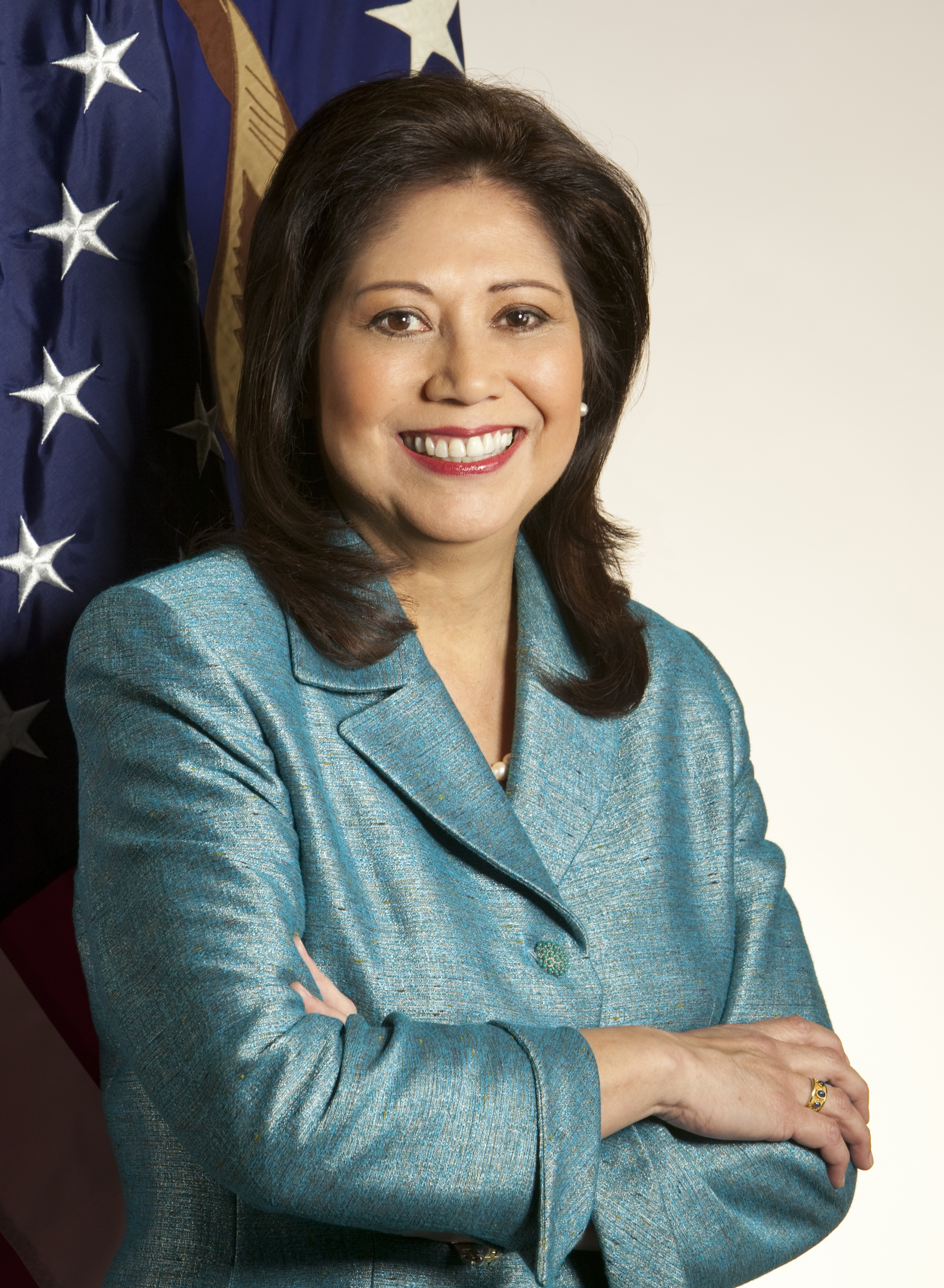
Hilda Solis in February 2009, becoming the first Latina to serve in the U.S. Cabinet

In 2005, Antonio Villaraigosa was elected mayor of Los Angeles, the first Latino in 130 years to hold the seat. Eric Garcetti became the second consecutive Mexican American mayor. Mexican-Americans tend to vote Democratic (in 1960, the John F. Kennedy presidential campaign boosted the Mexican American vote to over 80% for Kennedy). However, Mexican Americans in recent decades had a low turnout on election day. In 1984, 37 percent of Latino Americans voted for Ronald Reagan and George W. Bush targeted Latinos and won 35% of their votes in 2000, and 40% in 2004 and the fact that his brother Jeb Bush is married to a Mexican woman (Columba Bush).

Voters have elected a number of governors of Mexican descent in the Southwest, include Ezequiel Cabeza De Baca, Octaviano Ambrosio Larrazolo, Jerry Apodaca, Toney Anaya, Bill Richardson, and Raúl Héctor Castro in Arizona. Cruz Bustamante was the first Democratic lieutenant governor of California in 130 years from his election in 1999 to 2007, but Bustamante lost the gubernatorial election to Austrian-born actor Arnold Schwarzenegger, who went on to be state governor. Romualdo Pacheco served as 12th governor of California and remains the only Latino governor in the state's history as part of the United States.

== 2010s ==
=== Obama era ===
==== Electoral politics ====
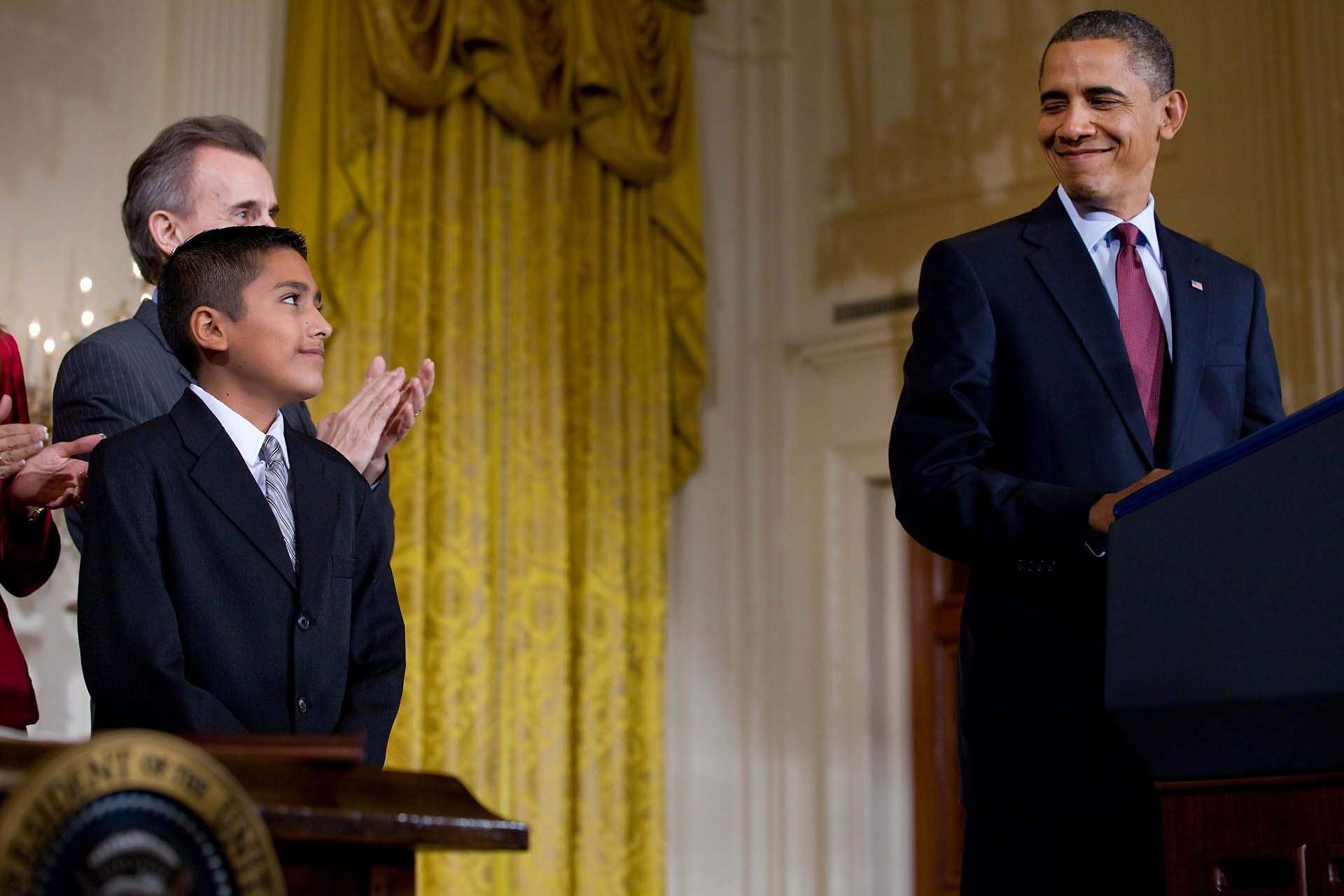
President Obama signed Exec. Order 13555, October 19, 2010

Mexican Americans made significant electoral strides during the Obama Era. In 2010, the Republican Brian Sandoval was elected governor of Nevada; he was the first Latino to ever do so. That same year, the Republican Susana Martinez became the first woman and Latina to be elected as governor of New Mexico and was the first Republican Latina governor in U.S. history. Also in 2010, Joseph García was elected the first Latino lieutenant governor of Colorado in the state's history.

During the 2012 United States presidential election, President Obama ran against the former-governor of Massachusetts Mitt Romney. During the campaign, Romney sparked outrage amongst many Mexican and Mexican American officials when he suggested the economic disparities between the United States and Mexico were the result of the "hand of providence". Latinos voted overwhelmingly for President Obama's re-election in 2012, when he earned as much as 71% of the community's vote.

In response to their overwhelming defeat, Reince Priebus, the chair of the Republican National Committee, ordered an "autopsy report" to assess deficiencies and paths forward for the party. The report called for greater inclusion of Mexican Americans, Latinos, and other minority groups, stating, "If Hispanic Americans hear that the GOP doesn't want them in the United States, they won't pay attention to our next sentence. It doesn't matter what we say about education, jobs or the economy; if Hispanics think that we do not want them here, they will close their ears to our policies." The report, however, was largely ignored by the GOP in the years ahead.

==== Immigration ====
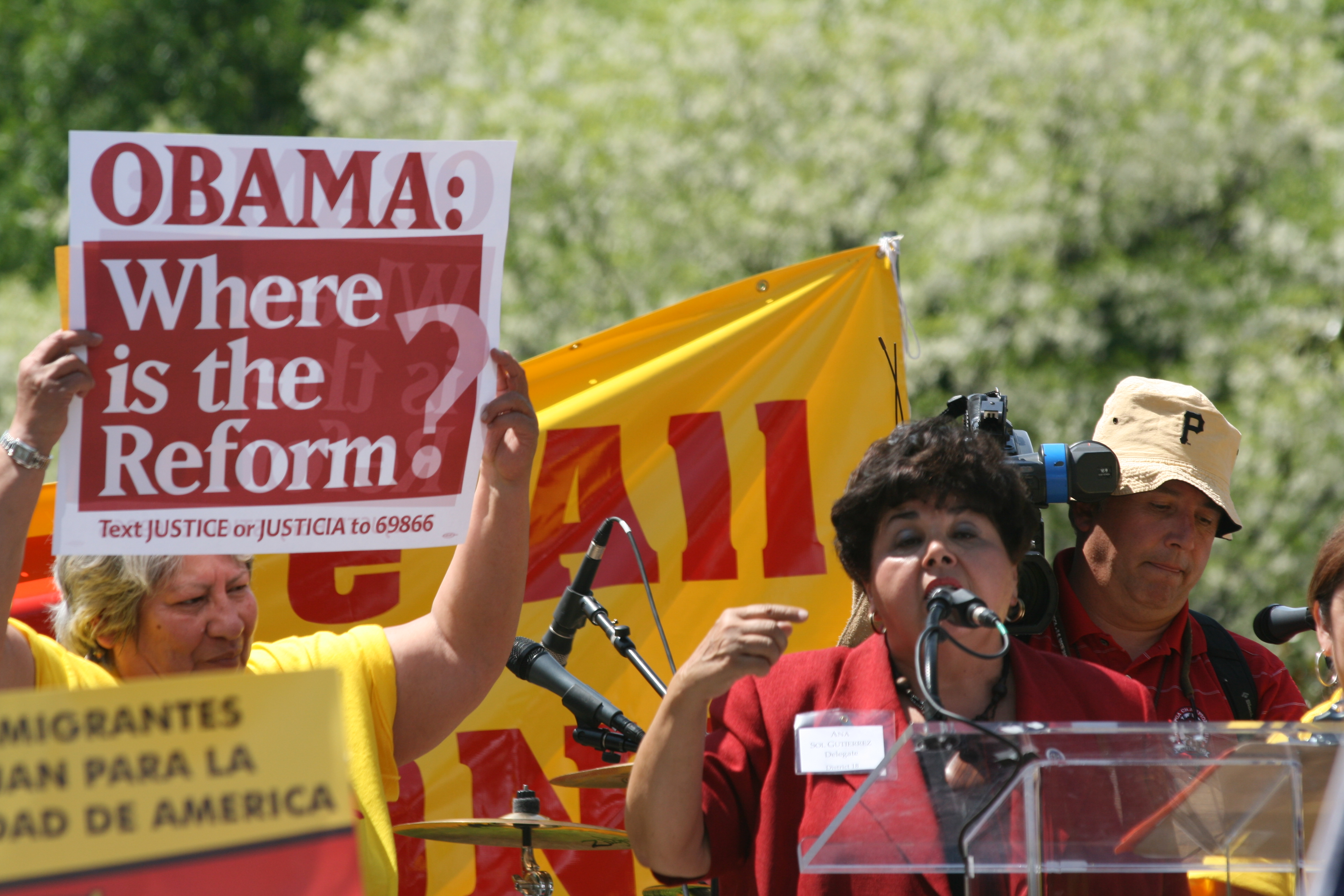
Protest against SB1070.

In the 2010s, nativism in the United States increased, particularly in border states like Arizona. In 2010, the Arizona State Legislature proposed and passed the Support Our Law Enforcement and Safe Neighborhoods Act (SB 1070). Critics of the bill argued it was a fundmantally racist law designed to legalize racial profiling. In Arizona v. United States (2012), the Supreme Court overturned three provisions of the bill, including: requiring "legal" immigrants to carry registration documents at all time; allowing state police to arrest any individual for suspicion of being undocumented; and making it a crime for undocumented people to search for or hold jobs in the state. Despite its overturning, the bill had negative social effects on the Mexican and Mexican American communities, particularly for children and youth. In the same year Arizona passed SB1070, it also passed Arizona House Bill 2281, effectively barring Mexican American Studies (history and literature) from being taught in the state's public schools.

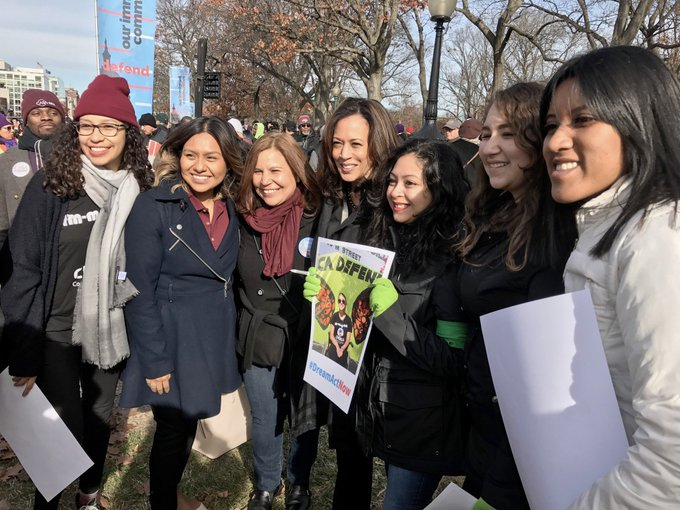
Kamala Harris with a group of DACA-recipients in 2017.

On June 15, 2012, President Barack Obama announced an executive branch memorandum known as Deferred Action for Childhood Arrivals (DACA). This change to immigration policy allowed eligible undocumented individuals brought to the country as children to receive a renewable two-year period of deferred action from deportation and become eligible for a work permit in the U.S. (without providing a path to citizenship for recipients). U.S. Citizenship and Immigration Services (USCIS) began accepting applications for the program on August 15, 2012, and in less than one year, over half a million people applied to the DACA program.

The next year, in 2013, a bi-partisan group of eight United States Senators — known as the Gang of Eight — wrote the first draft of the Border Security, Economic Opportunity, and Immigration Modernization Act of 2013. The bill would have provided a path to citizenship for millions of undocumented Americans. It passed the Senate with a strong majority (68–32), with 14 Republicans joining all Democrats; however, the United States House of Representatives under Speaker John Boehner did not act on the bill, and it expired at the end of the 113th Congress.

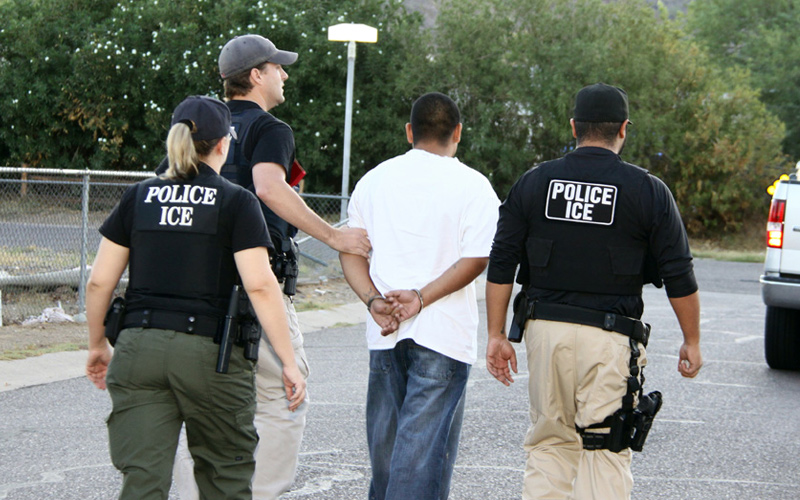
Young man apprehended by immigration officers.

During his time in office, President Obama was known in the Mexican American community as the "Deporter in Chief". Between 2009 and 2015, his administration removed more than 2.5 million people from the country, though some analysts claimed these numbers were "misleading" due to the way they were calculated. During his time in office, the Department of Homeland Security initiated two policies which represented a major shift from prior administrations. First, DHS began placing undocumented border crossers through formal removal proceedings; second, it made non-citizens "with criminal records" the agency's top deportation target. Thus, when faced with criticism for his administration's record high deportation numbers, President Obama responded by saying, "The statistics are actually a little deceptive ... we've been apprehending folks at the borders and sending them back. That is counted as a deportation even though they may have only been held for a day or 48 hours." Nevertheless, Obama faced significant criticism for his failure to pass immigration reform and for the detrimental effects of deportation on families' lives.

==== Gentrification ====
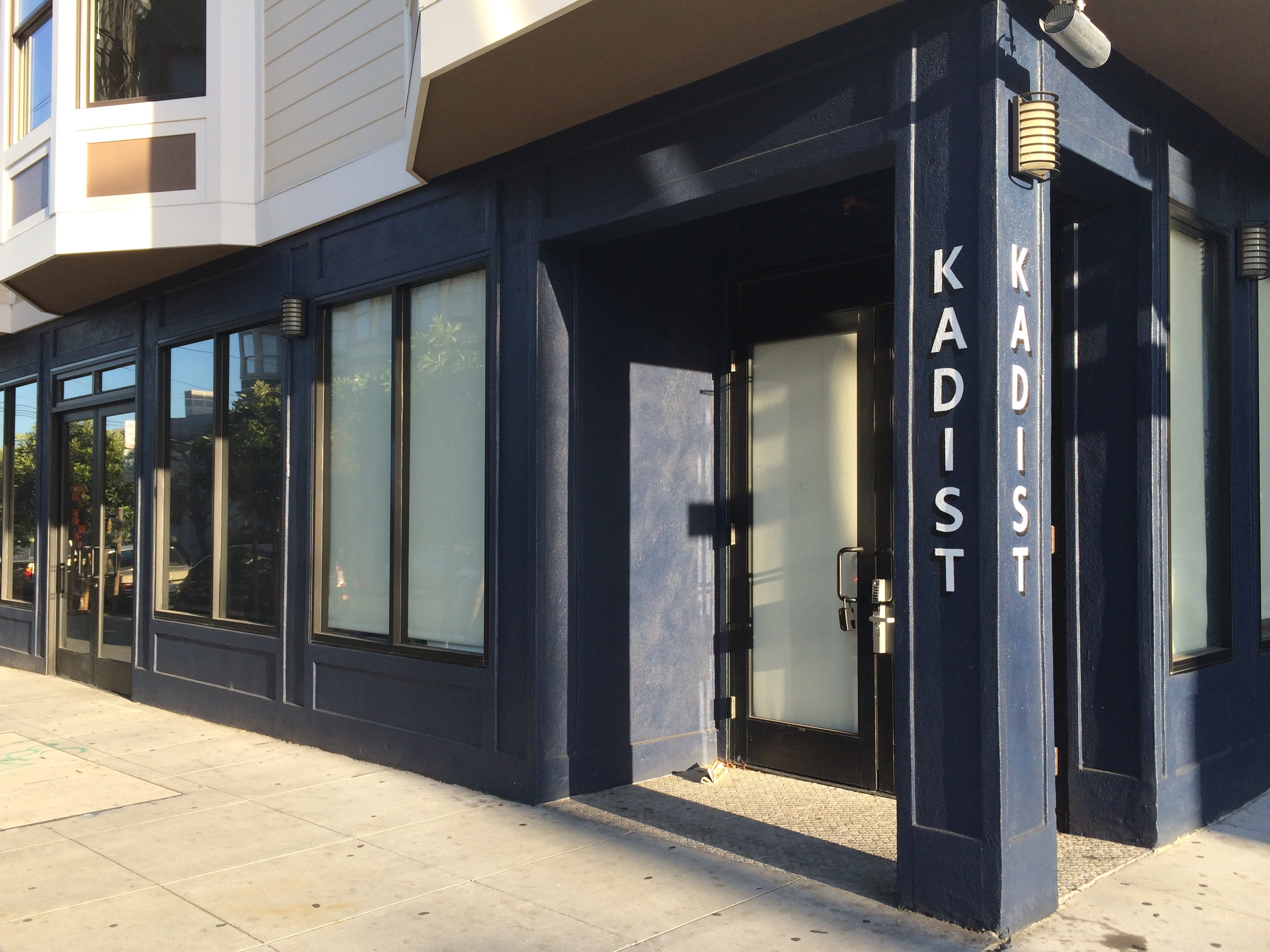
A French arts organization in the SF Mission District

One of the most serious issues facing urban Mexican Americans in the 2010s was residential displacement through gentrification. In San Francisco at this time, the predominantly Latino neighborhood, the Mission District, during the rapid expansion of Silicon Valley, created a housing shortage, which incentivized investors to buy properties in historically low-income neighborhoods (like the Mission) in order to renovate them and sell them at higher rates to tech workers. As a result, many of the neighborhoods' taquerias, bakeries, bars, and auto mechanic shops were replaced with luxury condominiums, organic ice cream stores, international art galleries, and upscale cafes. Significant resistance to the Mission's gentrification emerged, including the "restorative economics" of La Cocina Community Kitchen, the resistance art projects of the Clarion Alley Mural Project, the San Francisco tech bus protests, and the "radically inclusive" social services provided by the Dolores Street Community Services Shelter.

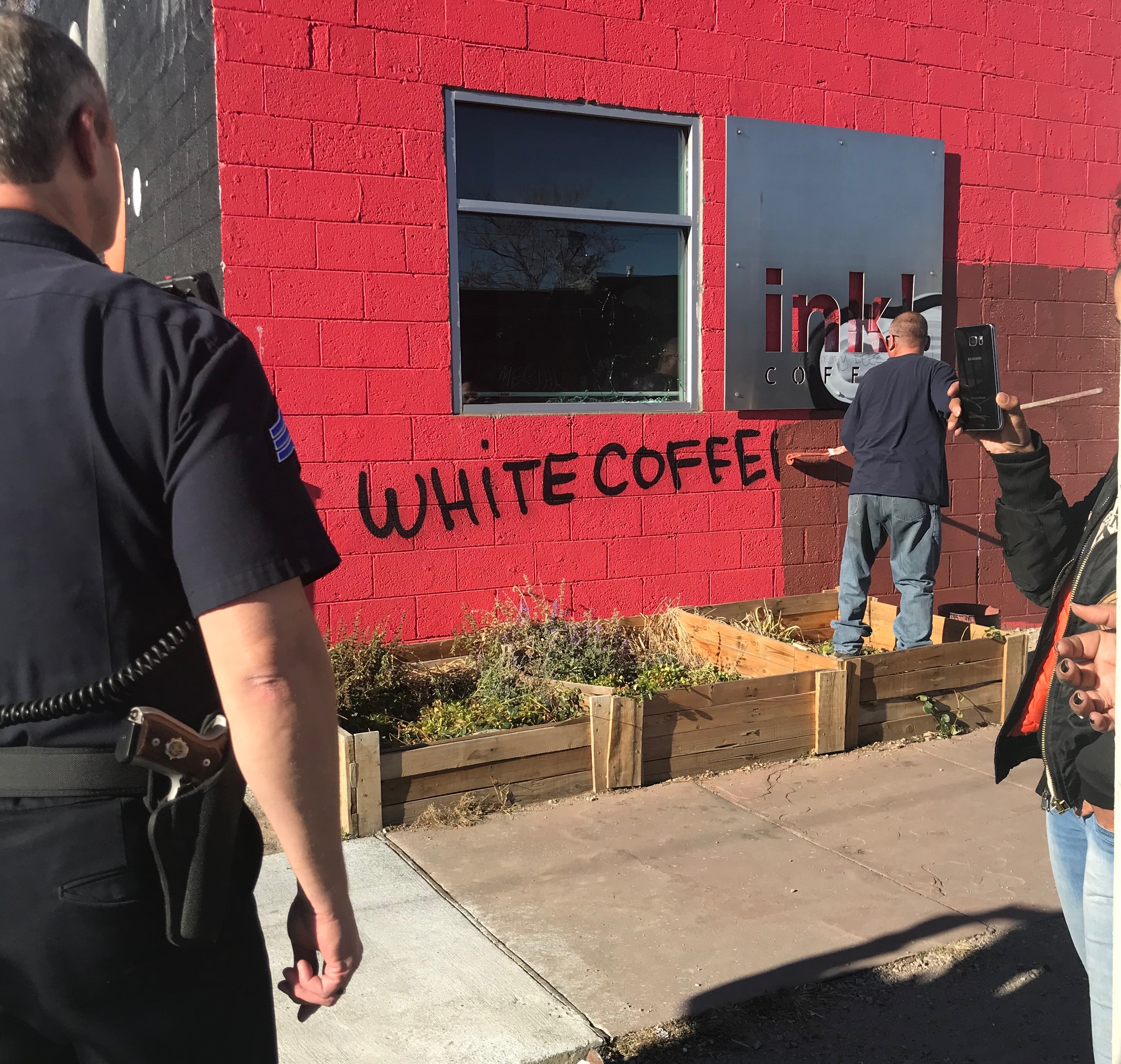
Gentrification protest, 2017

In Los Angeles, gentrification affected the traditionally Mexican American neighborhoods of Echo Park, Highland Park, and large swaths of East Los Angeles, particularly the neighborhood of Boyle Heights. As white, college-educated young people increasingly moved to Los Angeles in the 2010s, they wanted to live in "hip", "urban", "edgy" and importantly, affordable, neighborhoods. Their presence increasingly pushed rent up and made the neighborhoods unaffordable to long-time residents. In Boyle Heights, this process was sped up by the arrival of a subway station, called Mariachi Plaza station, which made the neighborhood even more desirable to young white gentrifiers wanting easy access to the rest of Los Angeles.

In 2016, significant controversy arose when the message "Fuck White Art" was spray-painted on the entrance to the Nicodim Gallery in Boyle Heights, especially when the LAPD classified the graffiti as a "hate crime". Modern commentators compared gentrification to the urban renewal projects of the 20th century and connected urban displacement to American capitalism, racism, and colonization.

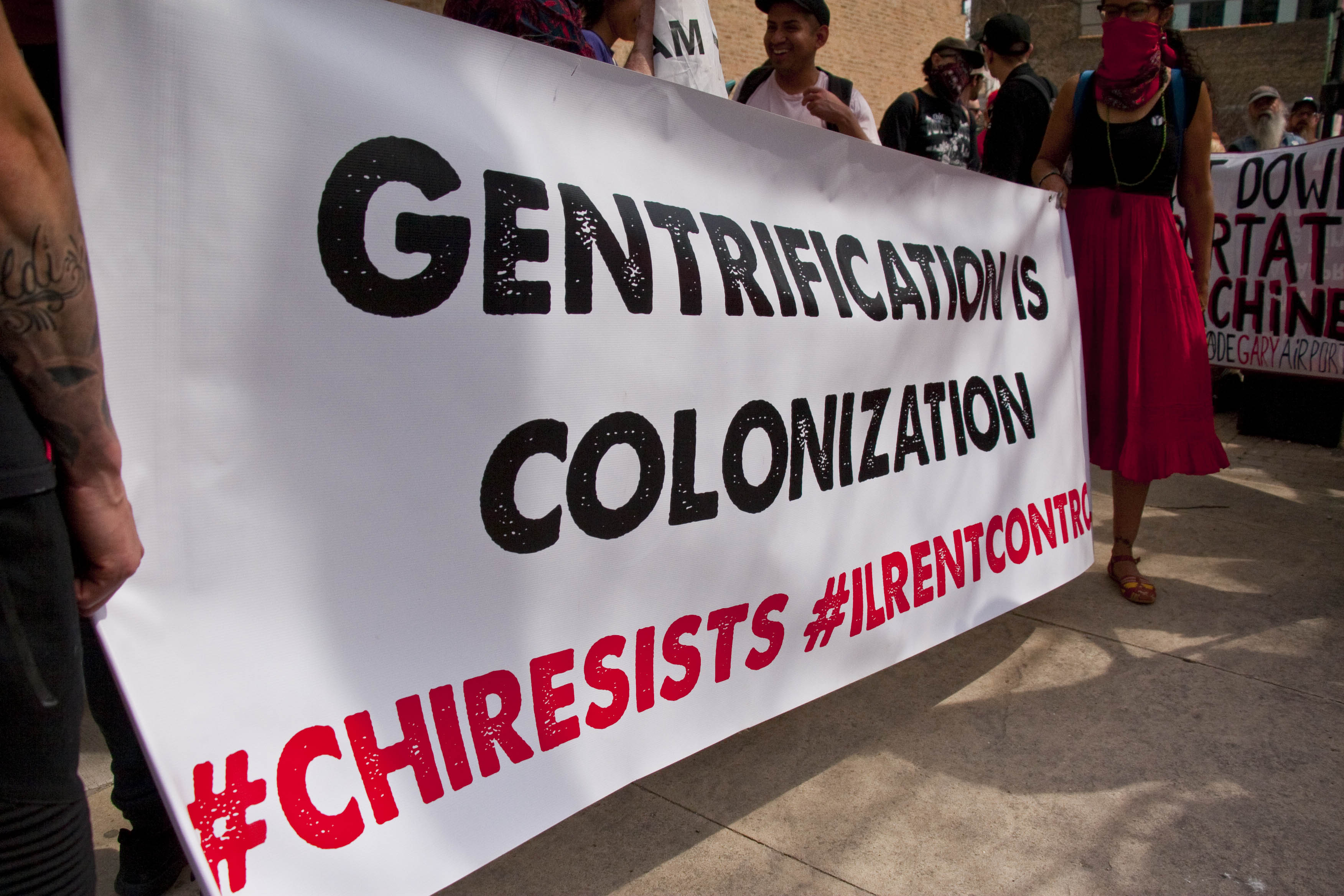
Protest against rising gentrification in Chicago

Gentrification affected many major urban Mexican American populations in the country, including in cities like San Diego, Albuquerque, and Chicago. In the neighborhood of Pilsen in Chicago, working class families experienced high levels of displacement due to rising rents and property taxes. Pilsen (which had grown as a Mexican American enclave in the 1960s and 1970s when expansions to the University of Illinois at Chicago's campus forced them into the neighborhood) became a "tourist attraction" in the 2010s, where sanitized versions of "Latinoness" were marketed to developers and new potential residents. The result was the opening of new businesses catered primarily to upscale non-resident visitors and recent arrivals. Pilsen's primary tool to resist gentrification was a grassroots effort to designate the neighborhood a historic landmark.

==== LGBT rights ====
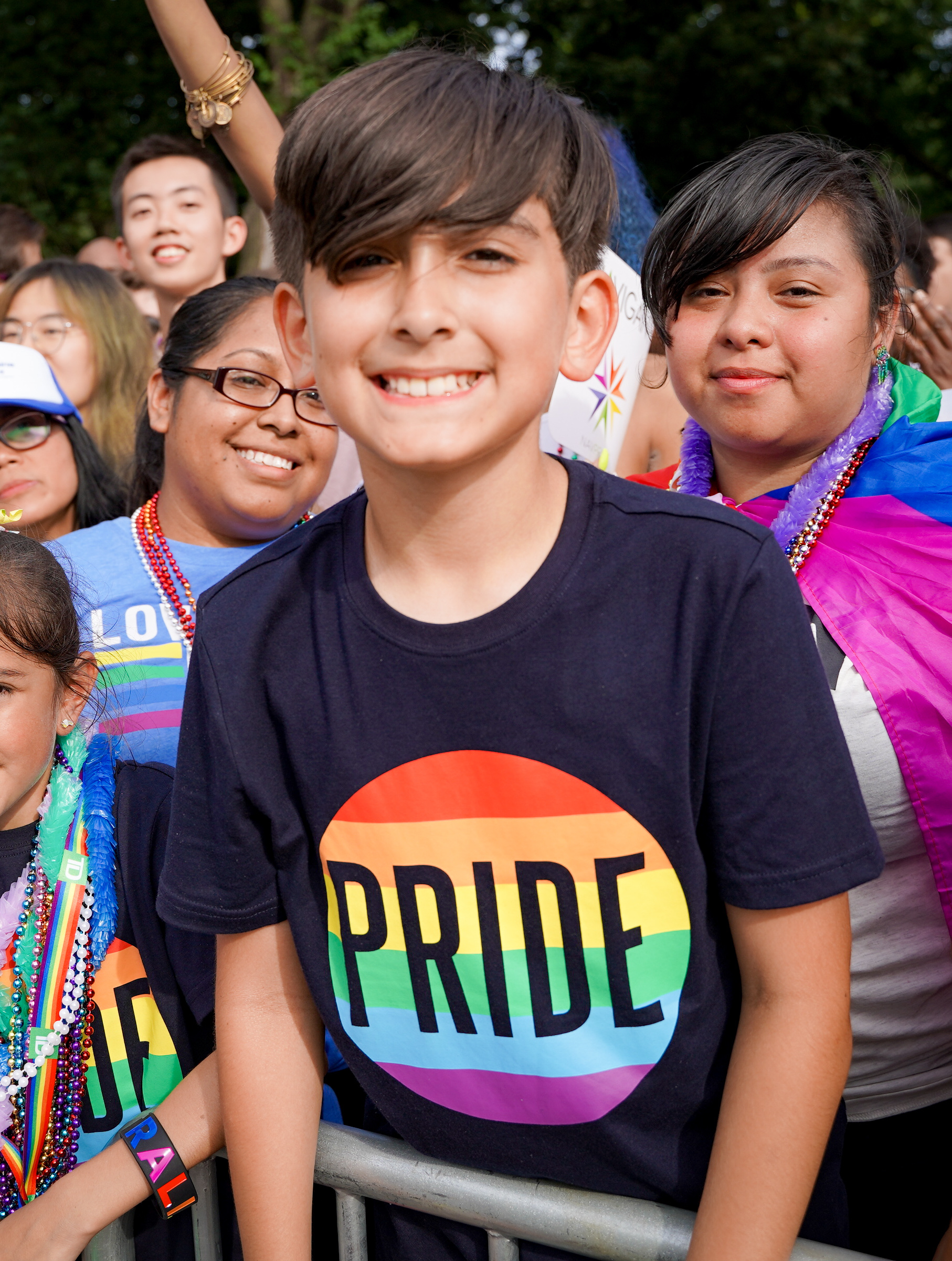
Young Latinos at the D.C. Capital Gay Pride Parade.

LGBTQ+ rights made significant strides in the 2010s. Between 2010 and 2019, public support for marriage equality rose by over 19 points, and 2011 marked the first time in U.S. history that more people supported same-sex marriage than opposed it. In 2011, President Obama formally ended the policy of "Don't ask, don't tell", allowing openly identified gay men and lesbians to serve in the U.S. military. In 2015, the U.S. Supreme Court ruled in Obergefell v. Hodges that same-sex marriage was a constitutionally protected right under the 14th Amendment. Around the time of the Supreme Court's ruling, Latino support for marriage equality was amongst the highest of any ethnic group.

Despite these significant strides, however, the Mexican American and Latino LGBT communities continued to struggle with many challenges. In the aftermath of the Great Recession, an approximately 4.2 million youth experienced homelessness in the U.S., of which 700,000 were unaccompanied minors. Of these 4.2 million, estimates range that between eleven and forty percent were LGBTQ, many of whom were Mexican American or Latino. Transgender equality also remained a major issue for many Mexican Americans. In the 2010s, black and Latino transgender women experienced homicide rates widely disproportionate to their percentage of the overall population.

The failure of the Obama administration or mainstream LGBT organizations to address any of these difficulties created outrage among the LGBT Mexican American and Latinx communities. In 2015, the activist Bamby Salcedo disrupted the opening session of the National LGBTQ Task Force's annual conference to protest the white LGBT community's continued ignorance regarding violence against transgender women of color. In the 2010s, LGBT Mexican and Latino ICE detainees also experienced alarmingly high rates of sexual abuse in U.S. immigration detention centers. The undocumented activist Jennicet Gutiérrez interrupted a speech by President Obama during a White House LGBT celebration dinner in 2015 to protest violent detention center conditions for LGBT Latinos.

=== "Build that wall!" ===
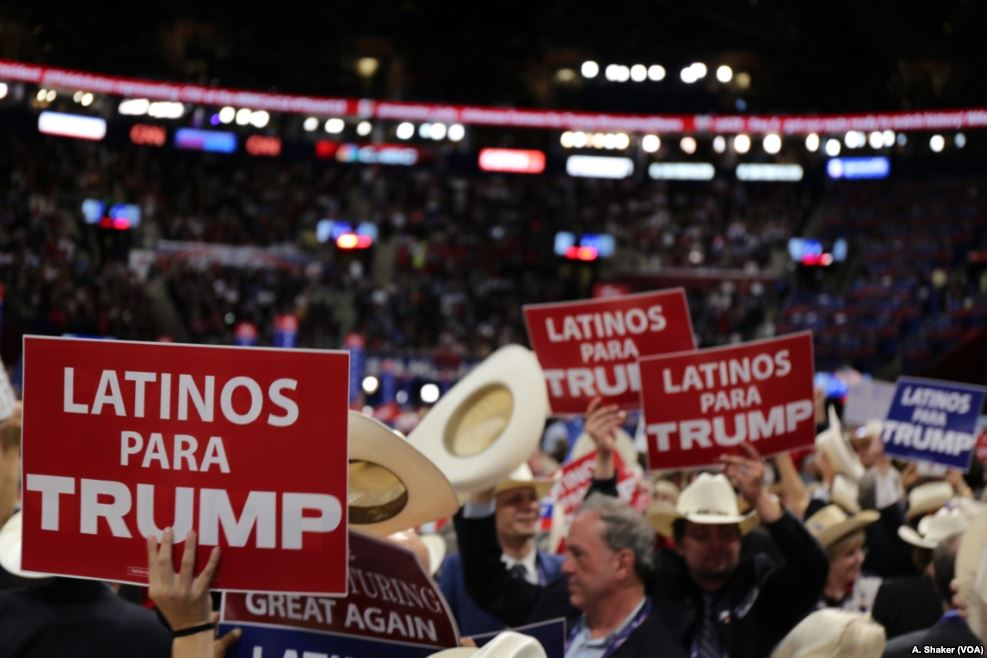
"Latinos para Trump" signs waved at the 2016 RNC.

From the start of Donald Trump's campaign for president, he faced accusations of racism and discrimination against Mexicans and Mexican Americans. In his announcement speech in August 2015, Trump falsely said the United States had become a "dumping ground" for unwanted people from other countries and received pushback in particular for his false statement: "When Mexico sends its people, they're not sending their best. They're bringing drugs. They're bringing crime. They're rapists. And some, I assume, are good people." The comment was interpreted by many to falsely imply that immigrants from Mexico had been "sent" to the U.S., and that many could be generalized as "criminals and rapists".

In June 2016, Trump was again accused of racism when he said he would be unable to receive a fair hearing from the Mexican American judge Gonzalo Curiel because, "The judge, who happens to be, we believe, Mexican ... [has] an absolute conflict ... I'm building a wall. It's an inherent conflict of interest." The border wall was one of the central themes of Trump's 2016 campaign, with many of his rallies featuring the chant, "Build that wall!" Numerous commentators noted the racial and nativist connotations underlying the campaign pledge to build a wall. Studies conducted during the 2016 presidential election showed negative online discourse surrounding Latinos was so severe that it negatively affected the community's mental well-being. Nevertheless, Trump won at least 18% of the Latino vote in 2016.

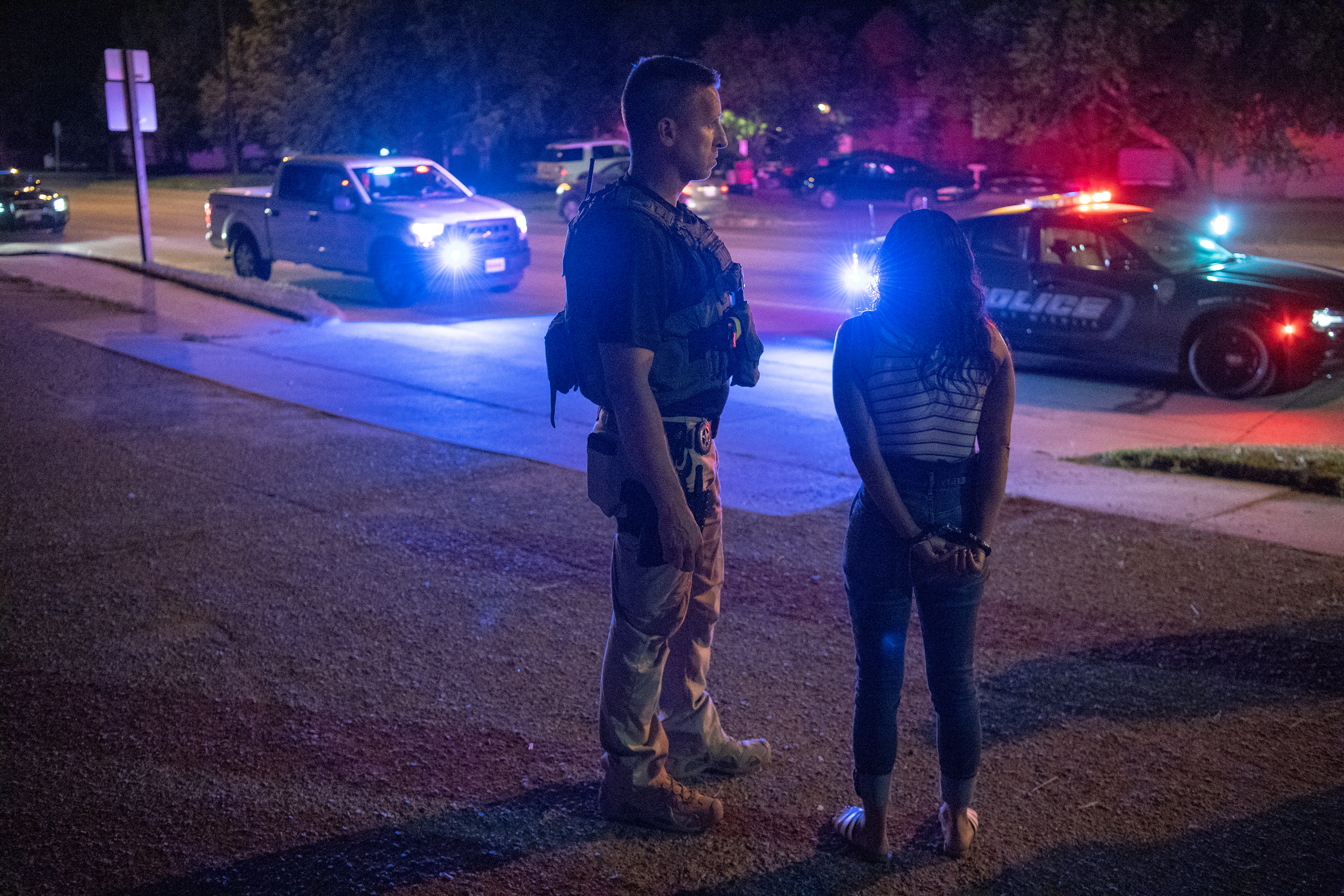
During the Trump administration, agencies, including the U.S. Marshals and ICE, collaborated in raids.

While in office, the Trump administration unleashed a series of controversial policies affecting Latinos. On May 7, 2018, Jeff Sessions, then Trump's attorney general, announced a new "zero tolerance" policy at the U.S.-Mexico border, meaning any person apprehended crossing the border without documentation would be charged criminally and any children accompanying them would be held separately. Though the policy was ended by executive order within a month, more than 500 children remained separated from their parents more than two years later. During the 2018 midterm elections, Trump politicized the Central American refugee crisis, claiming "terrorists" and "gang members" were secretly hiding alongside women and children in order to gain entry into the United States.

After the midterm elections, the Trump administration adopted the "Remain in Mexico" program, which essentially sought to shut down asylum entry into the country. The policy resulted in a humanitarian crisis, as tens of thousands of refugees were forced to live in makeshift tent encampments in Mexico while they awaited an asylum hearing. Trump's efforts on the border resulted in the erection of over 53 miles of new border wall and the renovation of over 400 miles of existing border walls; this wall construction sparked outrage for its impact on indigenous communities. During the Trump years, Immigration and Customs Enforcement also collaborated with other U.S. law enforcement agencies, such as the U.S. Marshals, to conduct large "crime raids", during which hundreds of people were arrested and deported if found to be undocumented. In fact, in 2019, ICE conducted the largest single-state immigration raid in U.S. history.

==== Trump protests ====
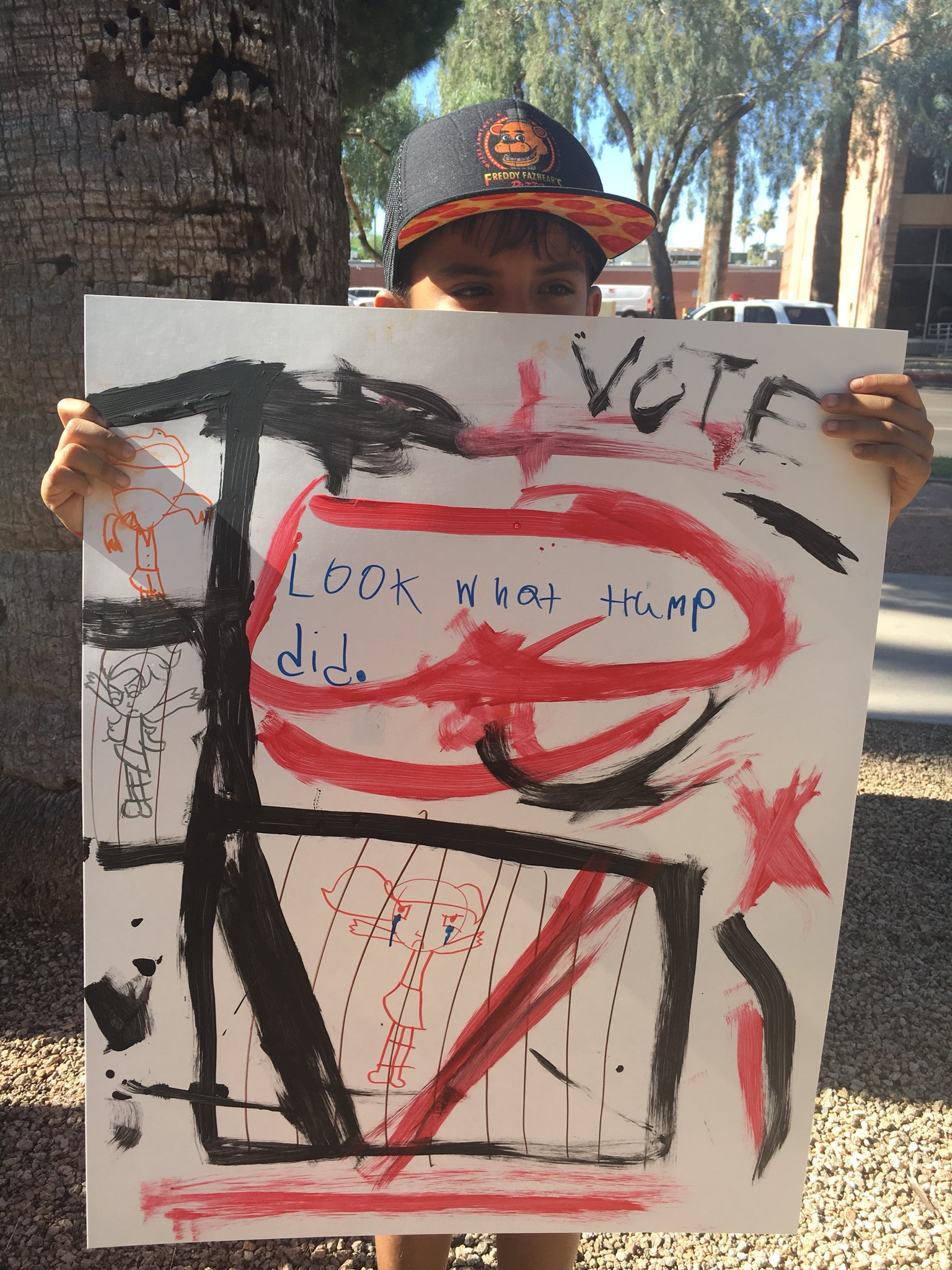
Boy holding up a sign at a Families Belong Together march in Phoenix, Arizona.

The 2010s saw levels of mass protest unseen in the United States since the Civil Rights movement of the 1960s. In 2017, the Day without Immigrants protested President Donald Trump's plans to build a border wall and to potentially deport millions of undocumented immigrants. In 2018, protests against Trump's family separation policy occurred in over 700 cities and towns in the United States, many under the title, "Families Belong Together". Also in response to the Trump's family separation policies, widespread calls emerged to shut down U.S. Immigration and Customs Enforcement (ICE), usually expressed under the slogan "Abolish ICE".

In 2019, as the Trump administration sought to end the DACA program, the United States Supreme Court agreed to hear their case. DHS v. University of California created significant controversy, and major protests in support of "Dreamers" occurred across the country. Major American corporations also voiced their support for the DACA program, and the Supreme Court ultimately upheld the program. Mexicans Americans were also involved with many of the major social movements during the Trump presidency, including the movement for Black Lives Matter and racial justice, the Women's March (the Chicana activist Carmen Perez was one of four national co-chairs of the 2017 March), and gun control movements like March For Our Lives.

According to some scholars, the intense activist energy during the Trump presidency motivated young Mexican Americans to adopt a political identity of "neo-Chicanismo", defined by ethnic pride, cultural heritage and expression, and protecting immigrants' rights. This younger activist generation also actively adopted gender neutral language, such as the terms "Chicanx" and "Xicanx" as a way to push back against gender bias in politics, society, and activism.

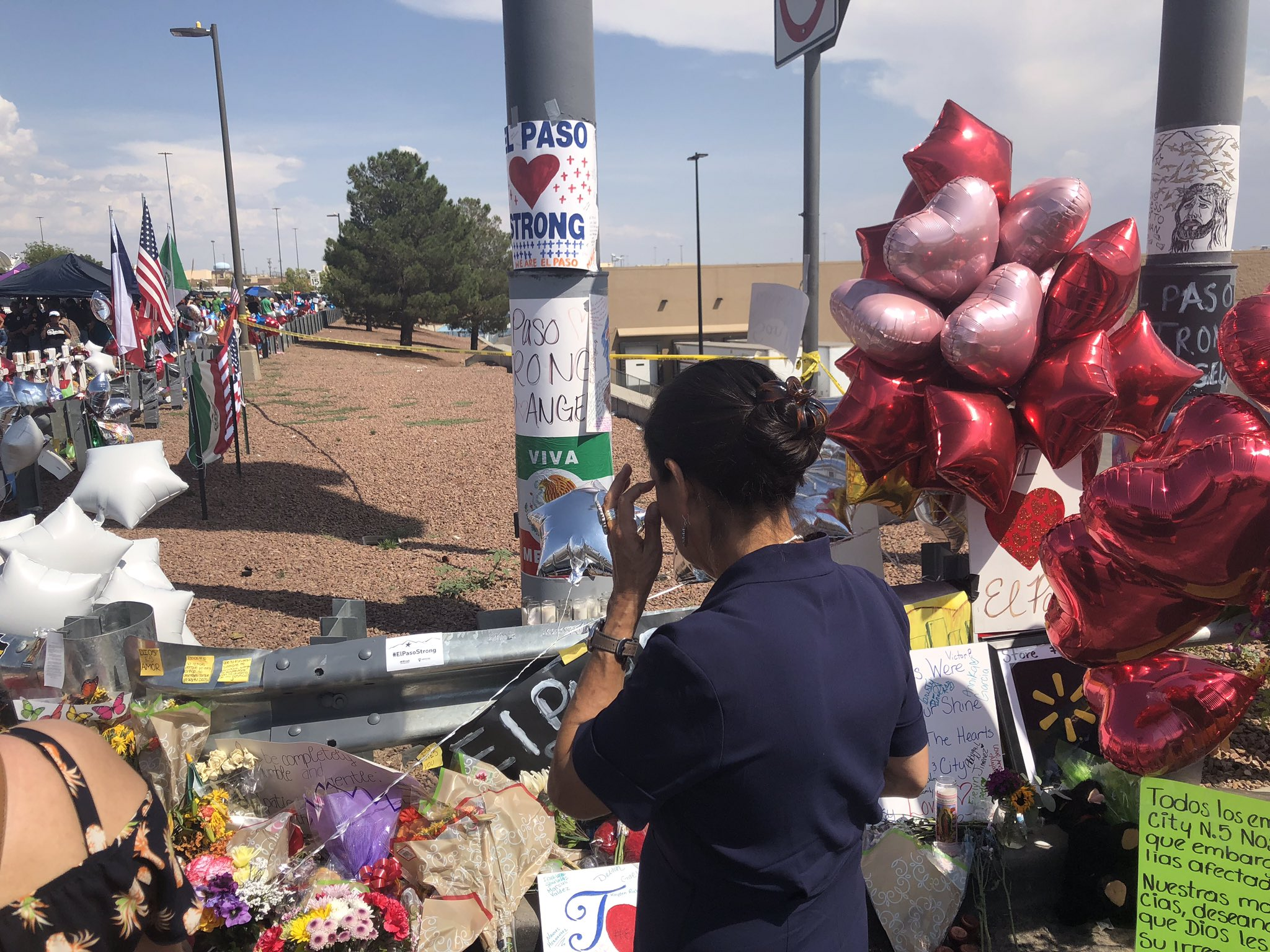
House Rep. Deb Haaland visits a memorial to the victims of the El Paso shooting.

==== El Paso shooting ====
In the 2010s, the amount of white nationalist domestic terrorism increased dramatically. There was a large surge in white supremacist and other hate group membership during the Obama administration, and the United States saw a record number of hate crimes committed during the first Trump administration. In 2019, one of the largest mass shootings against Latino Americans occurred at a Walmart store in El Paso, Texas when a white terrorist, Patrick Crusius, murdered 23 people and injured 23 others.

Crusius was mostly radicalized online, an increasingly common trend in the U.S. Shortly before the attack, he posted his "manifesto" to the online message board 8chan, where he wrote about a "Latino invasion of Texas", claiming "white people were being replaced by foreigners." He faces 90 federal charges, and he will receive the death penalty if found guilty.

== 2020s ==
=== Politics ===
In 2020, former House Representative and Secretary of Housing and Urban Development Julian Castro became the first serious Mexican American candidate for president since Ben Fernandez ran in the 1980 Republican primaries. Castro dropped out of the race on January 6, 2020, after polling far behind other candidates, and he announced his support for Joe Biden on June 2, 2020. During the 2020 general election, some experts were surprised at the strength of Donald Trump's support amongst Mexican Americans in areas like the Rio Grande Valley, which increased by 10% from 2016. In January 2021, Democrat Alex Padilla became the first Latino California senator.

=== Police violence ===
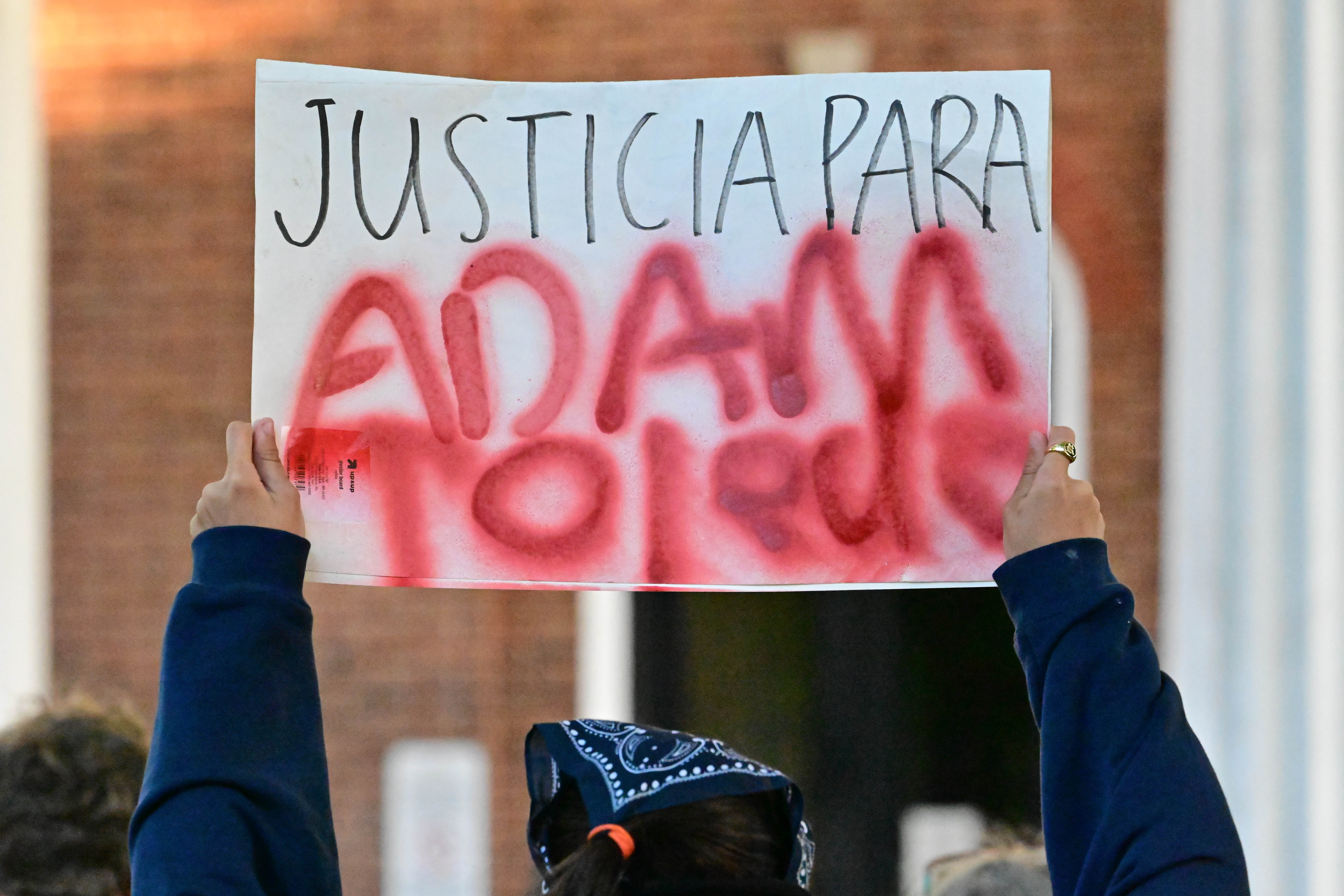
Sign reading, "Justicia para Adam Toledo", calling for justice for Adam Toledo in April 2021.

In the 2020s, Mexican Americans and other Latinos joined calls for racial justice and an end to police brutality in the United States. Analysis of fatal U.S. police shootings in October 2020 showed that in the prior five years, Native Americans, black Americans, and Latinos were the three ethnic groups killed by police at the highest rates in the country, respectively. Activists within the community, however, expressed frustration that in the years leading up to the 2020–21 United States racial unrest, police killings of Latino boys and men had largely been met with sustained national indifference. Nationally, over 900 Latinos were killed by the police in just the five years leading up to 2020.

=== COVID-19 ===
The COVID-19 pandemic disproportionately impacted the Mexican American and Latino communities. Latinos were dying three times as much as the non-Latino white population. In 2020, approximately 1 in 1,150 Latinos in the U.S. died from COVID-19. Because many Mexican Americans and Latinos disproportionately work in the service-sector, and were thus considered part of the "essential" workforce, they had to bear a major part of the pandemic's force. Complications from COVID-19 were especially dire for Latinos without health insurance. Many Mexican Americans and Latinos began relying on food banks and unemployment insurance to keep their families alive.

== See also ==
- List of Mexican Americans
- History of Hispanic and Latino Americans
- Hispanos of New Mexico
- History of Mexican Americans in Texas
- Mexican Americans in Chicago
- Mexican Americans in Dallas-Fort Worth
- Mexican Americans in Detroit
- Mexican Americans in Houston
- Mexican Americans in Los Angeles
- Mexican Americans in Omaha
- Mexican Americans in Tucson
